= Dar Khemakhem =

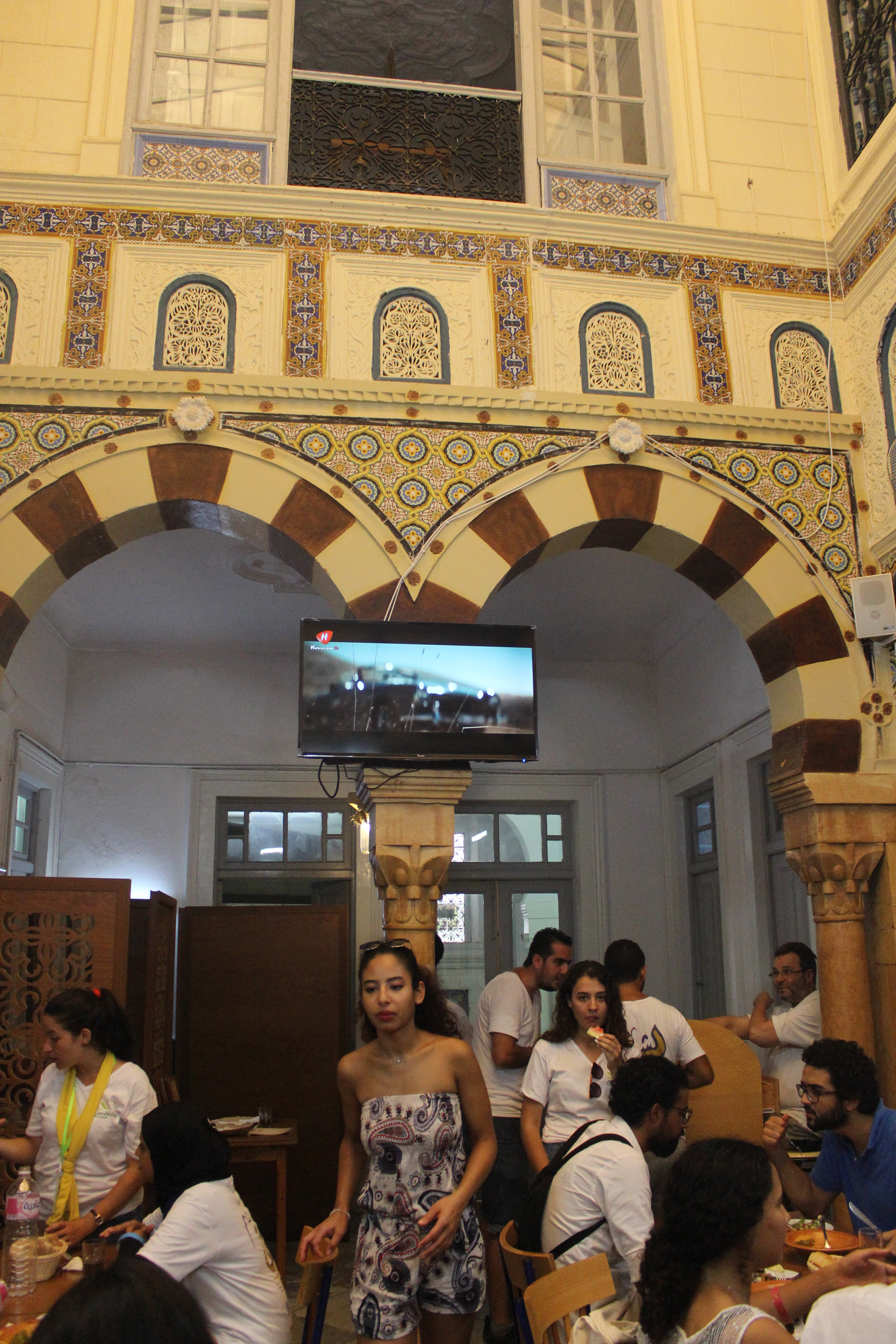
Hall of Dar Khemakhem

Dar Khemakhem (arabic: دار خماخم) is one of the old houses of the medina of Sfax.

== Location ==
The house is located in the north-western quarter of the medina, in Cheikh Tijani street (also known as zuqaq El Dhhab or the gold's street), one of the most prestigious streets of the medina in the 19th century. The house is close to Dar Kammoun and Dar Laadhar.

== History ==
The house belongs to the Khemakhem family since the 19th century.

After the revolution, and as part of the activities of "Sfax, Arab Capital of Culture" festival in 2016, it got converted into a cultural space for local organisations to host their activities and meetings.

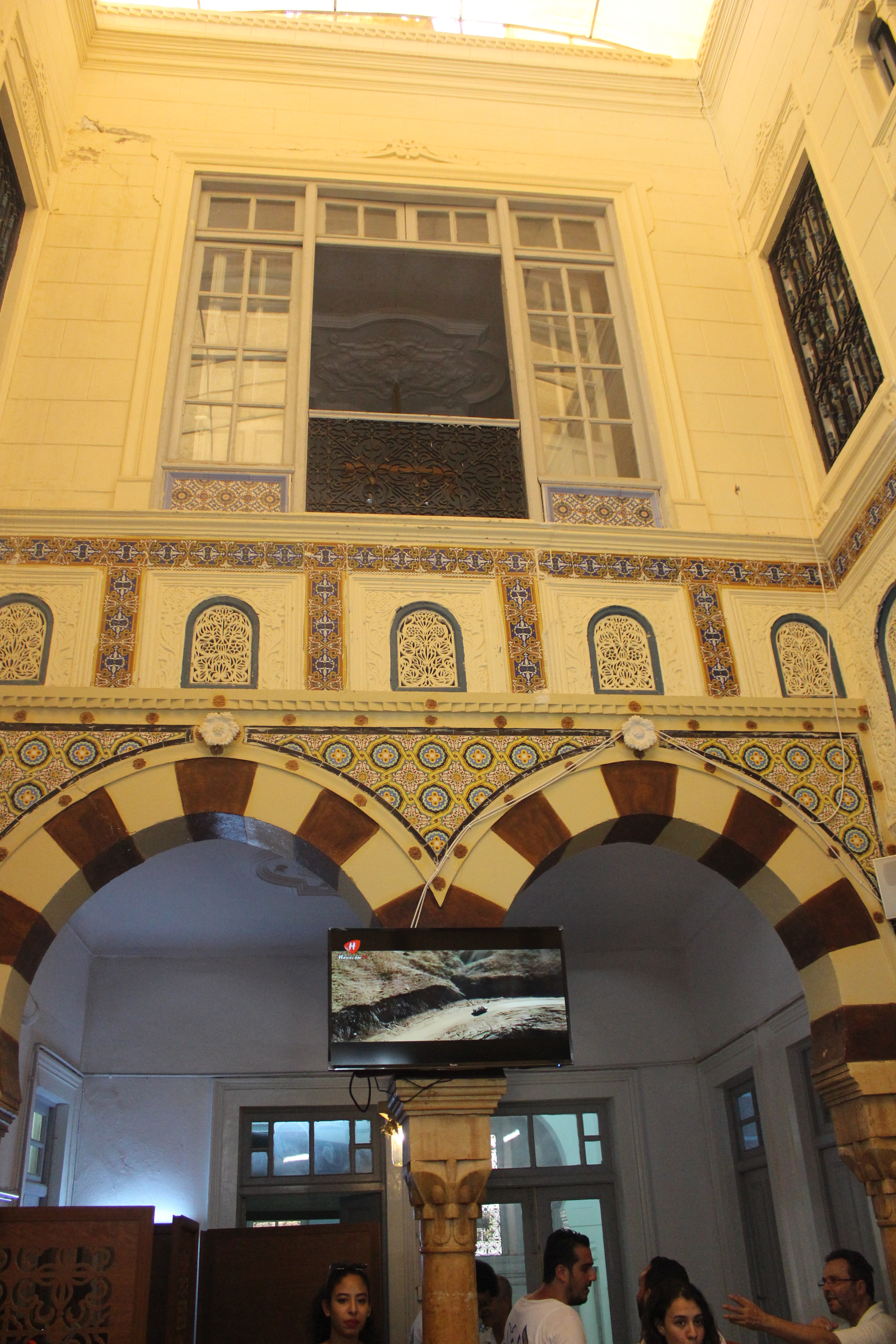
Central facade

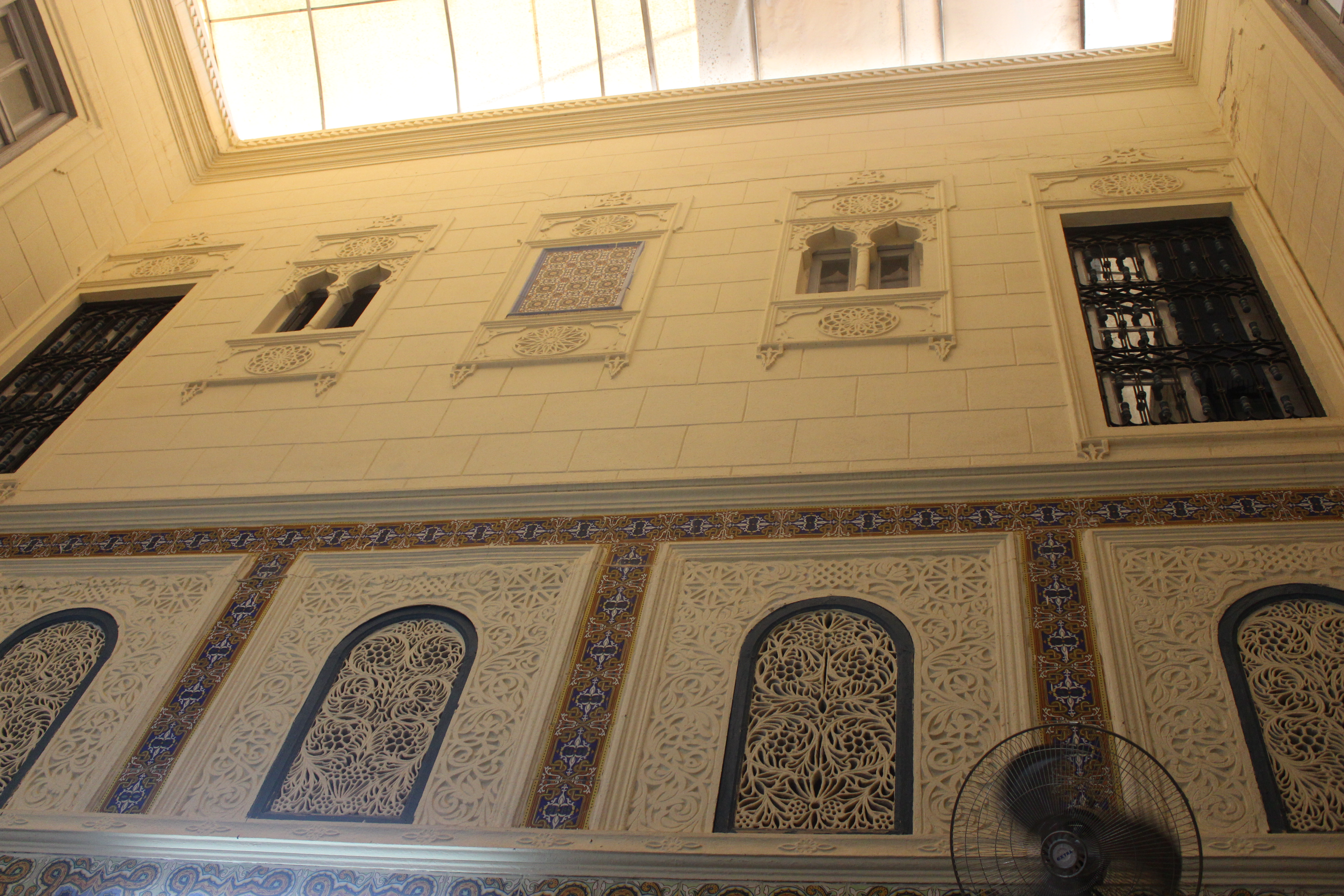
Lateral facade

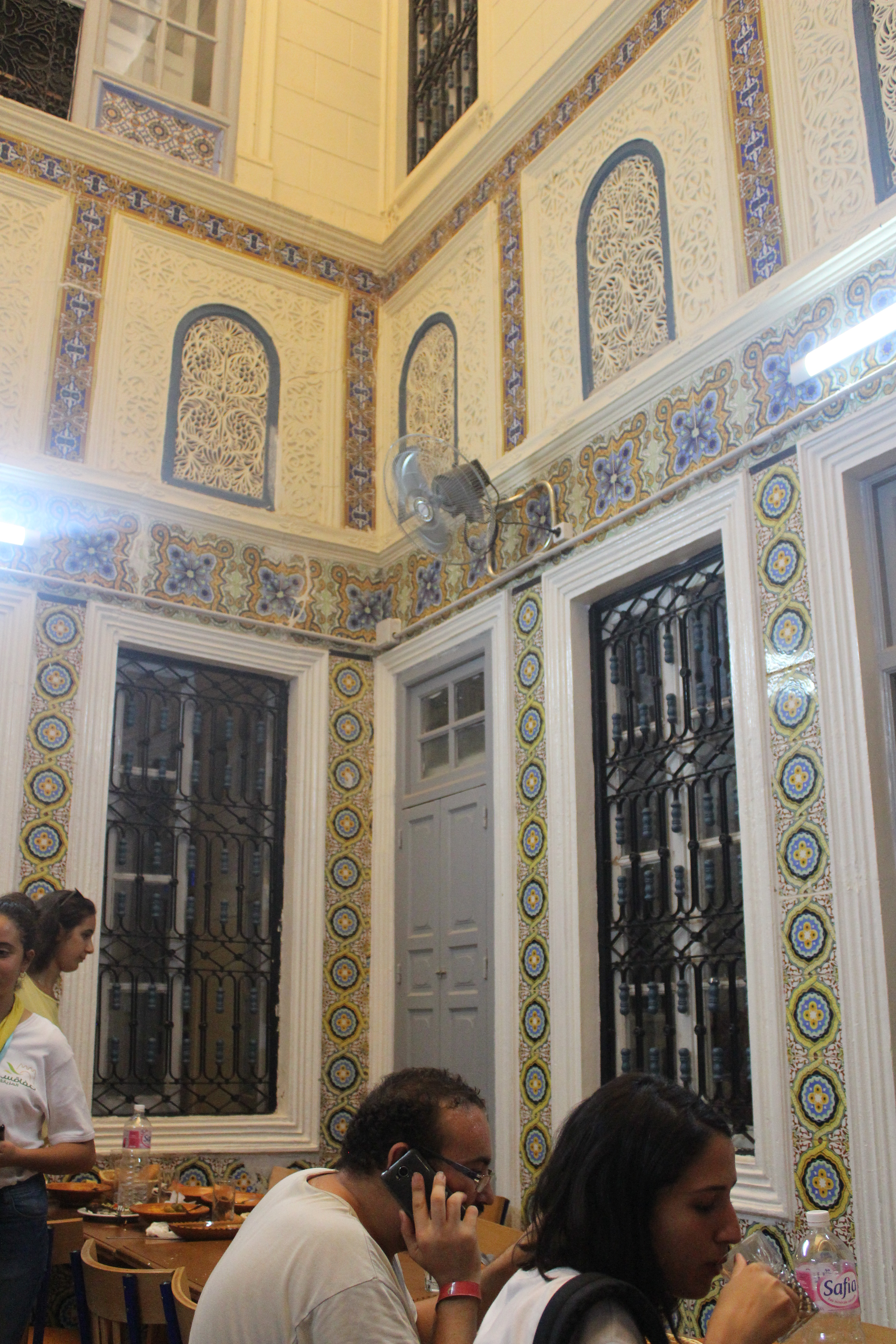
Decoration of the windows

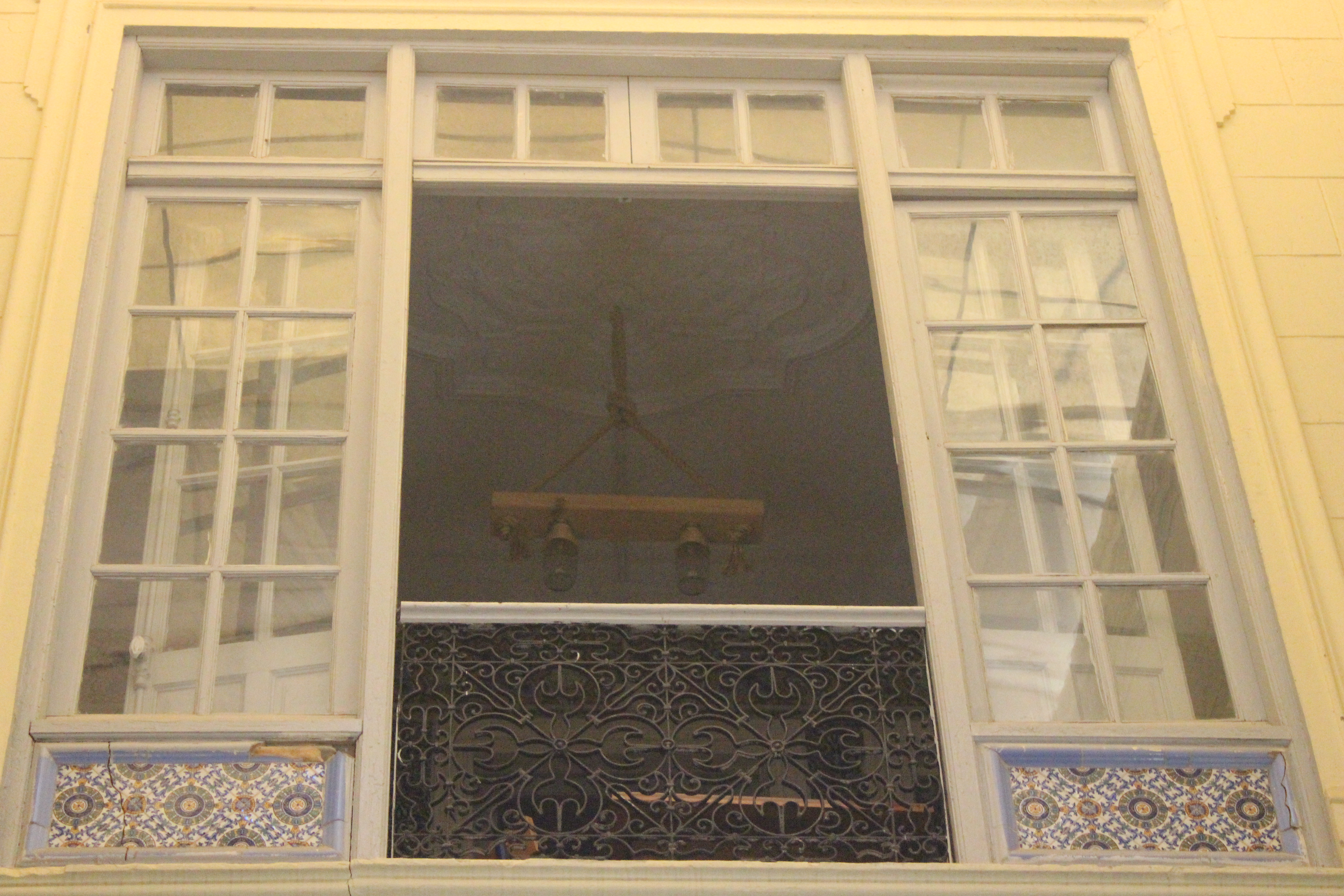
Central balcony
