= List of ambassadors of Qatar to the United States =

Ambassador of Qatar to the United States Embassy of Qatar, Washington, D.C.
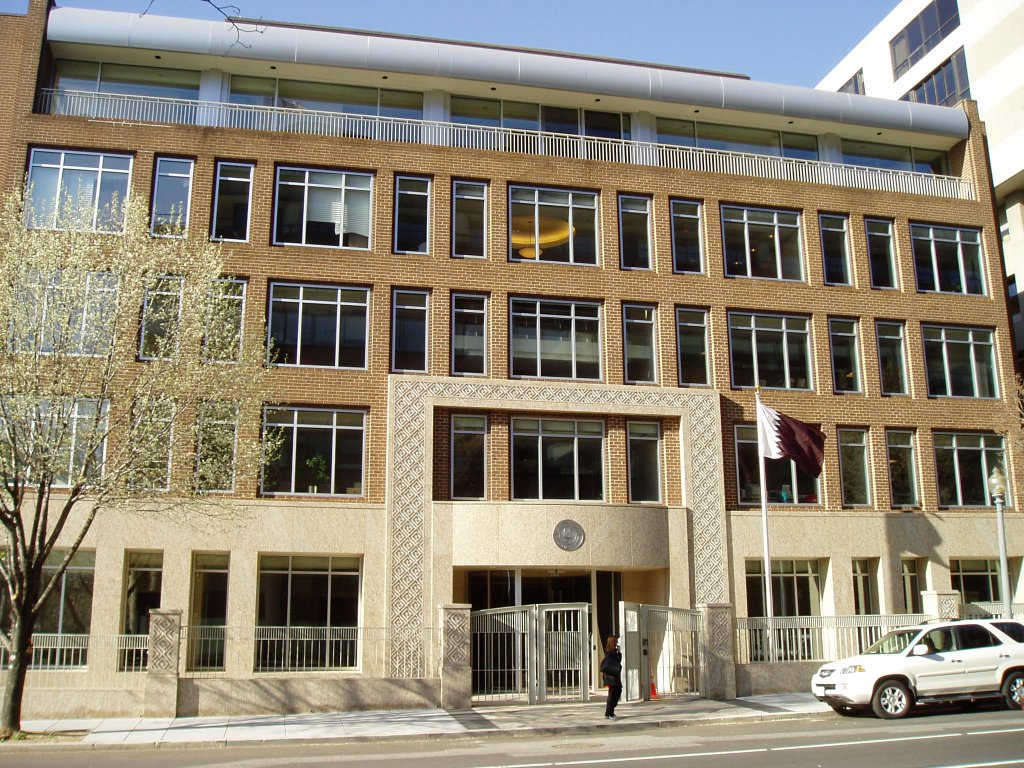
- Incumbent; Meshal bin Hamad Al Thani since January 2016
- Inaugural holder: Abdullah Saleh Al Mana
- Formation: July 21, 1972

The Qatari ambassador in Washington, D. C. is the official representative of the Government in Doha to the Government of the United States.

== List of representatives ==
Diplomatic agrément	Diplomatic accreditation	Ambassador	Observations	List of prime ministers of Qatar	List of presidents of the United States	Term end
July 21, 1972			EMBASSY OPENED	Khalifa bin Hamad Al Thani	Richard Nixon	
June 22, 1972	July 21, 1972	Abdullah Saleh Al Mana		Khalifa bin Hamad Al Thani	Richard Nixon	
June 23, 1980	August 22, 1980	Abdel Qader Bareek al-Amari	Name shown on Diplomatic list as Abdelkader Braik Al-Ameri - at Ambassador's request)	Khalifa bin Hamad Al Thani	Jimmy Carter	
March 24, 1987	May 11, 1987	Ahmad bin Abdullah Al Mahmoud		Khalifa bin Hamad Al Thani	Ronald Reagan	
January 17, 1990	February 5, 1990	Hamad Bin Abdulaziz Al-Kawari	1989. Permanent Representative next the United Nations Headquarter.	Khalifa bin Hamad Al Thani	George H. W. Bush	
February 17, 1993	April 14, 1993	Sheikh Abdulrahman bin Saud al-Thani	now head of the amiri diwan royal court). He is effectively chief of staff to the emir head of state), Sheikh Hamad.	Khalifa bin Hamad Al Thani	Bill Clinton	
September 23, 1994		Naser Abdul Aziz Al-Naser	was granted agreement on September 23, 1994 but his name was recalled by his government in the summer of 1996. 2006 he was:Nassir Bin Abdulaziz Al-Nasser, Ambassador and Permanent Representative of the State of Qatar to the United Nations	Khalifa bin Hamad Al Thani	Bill Clinton	
March 5, 1997	May 14, 1997	Saad Mohamed Al-Kobaisi		Abdullah bin Khalifa Al Thani	Bill Clinton	
September 1, 2000	September 5, 2000	Bader Al-Dafa	Omar Bader Al-Dafa	Abdullah bin Khalifa Al Thani	Bill Clinton	
August 24, 2005	October 3, 2005	Nasser Bin Hamad M. Al-Khalifa		Abdullah bin Khalifa Al Thani	George W. Bush	
April 7, 2008	April 9, 2008	Ali Bin Fahad Al-Hajri	Ali Bin Fahad Faleh Al-Hajri	Hamad bin Jassim bin Jaber Al Thani	George W. Bush	
March 29, 2012	May 2, 2012	Mohamed Abdullah M. Al Rumaihi	is the Minister of Municipality and Environment of the State of Qatar. Prior to his appointment in January 2016, Minister Al Rumaihi served as Assistant Foreign Minister overseeing bilateral affairs from December 2013. Minister Al Rumaihi previously served as Qatar's Ambassador to the US, France, Belgium, Luxembourg, Switzerland and the European Union. He was also Commander of the Artillery Corps in the Qatar Armed Forces, rising to the rank of Major General. Minister Al Rumaihi has a B.A. in Military Sciences from Saint Cyr Military Academy and an M.A. in Military, Command and Staff Sciences from the Higher School of Joint Military Staff in France.	Hamad bin Jassim bin Jaber Al Thani	Barack Obama	
January 15, 2014	November 18, 2016	Mohammed Jaham Al Kuwari		Abdullah bin Nasser bin Khalifa Al Thani	Barack Obama	2022
December 2016		Sheikh Meshal bin Hamad Al Thani			Donald Trump	
