= Rasha Abbas =

Syrian author and journalist

Rasha Abbas (Arabic: رشا عباس, born 1984 in Latakia, Syria) is a Syrian writer and journalist, best known for The Invention of German Grammar, a collection of short stories in Arabic about her experience as a refugee in Germany. She was a winner of the young writers' award at the 2008 Arab Capital of Culture.

== Life and career ==
Abbas was born in Latakia but her family later moved and she was brought up in Damascus and studied journalism at Damascus University in 2002. While working as an editor at the Syrian state television, she published a collection of short stories, Adam hates TV, for which she won a young writers award at the 2008 Arab Capital of Culture.

When the Syrian civil war started, she joined the anti-government protest movement. A year later, she was forced into exile in Lebanon. In 2014, she won a Jean-Jacques Rousseau fellowship for a three-month residency at the Akademie Schloss Solitude in Stuttgart, Germany. During this time, she published her second book of short stories, The Invention of German Grammar. This fictionalised her experiences of settling in Germany as a refugee, and of learning the German language. The German translation appeared before the Arabic original manuscript. It was later published by the Lebanese office of the Heinrich Böll Foundation and had to be slightly rewritten for Arabic readers.

In 2017, Abbas participated in the Shubbak Literature Festival at the British Library, London. Her presentation, The King of Cups, was based on her research on the cultural and political ramifications of the short-lived union between Syria and Egypt as the United Arab Republic. Her story “You can call me Velvet”, translated by Katharine Halls, was shortlisted for the 2021 ArabLit Story Prize.

Abbas successfully applied for asylum in Germany after her residency in Stuttgart. She currently lives in Schöneberg, Berlin.

== Selected works ==
=== Articles and stories ===
- Rasha Abbas (30 October 2017). "Judo". Translated by Robin Moger. Strange Horizons.
- Rasha Abbas (30 August 2017). "The Sword and Sheath". Translated by Elisabeth Jaquette. Shubbak Blog.
- Rasha Abbas (1 July 2017). "King of Cups". Translated by Elisabeth Jaquette. Shubbak Blog.
- Rasha Abbas (20 October 2016). "How Political Can We Get While Writing?". Schloss-Post.
- Rasha Abbas (2 November 2015). "Miserable Work Chronicles". Translated by Alice Guthrie. Schloss-Post.
- Rasha Abbas (October 2014). "Falling Down Politely, or How to Use Up All Six Bullets Instead of Playing Russian Roulette". Translated by Alice Guthrie. Words Without Borders.
- Rasha Abbas (11 September 2014). "Art and Culture from the Frontline: In the hope that Syria Speaks even more!". Translated by Alice Guthrie. English PEN.

=== Books ===
- Rasha Abbas (2017). The Gist of It (in Arabic). Milan: Manshurat Al-Mutawassit. ISBN 9788885771192.
- Rasha Abbas (2016). Die Erfindung der deutschen Grammatik [The Invention of German Grammar] (in German). Translated by Sandra Herzl. Orlanda. ISBN 978-3944666259.
- Rasha Abbas (2008). Adam hates TV.
