= Hamad Bin Abdulaziz Al-Kawari =

Qatari diplomat and politician

Hamad Bin Abdulaziz Al-Kuwari
- حمد بن عبد العزيز الكوّاري
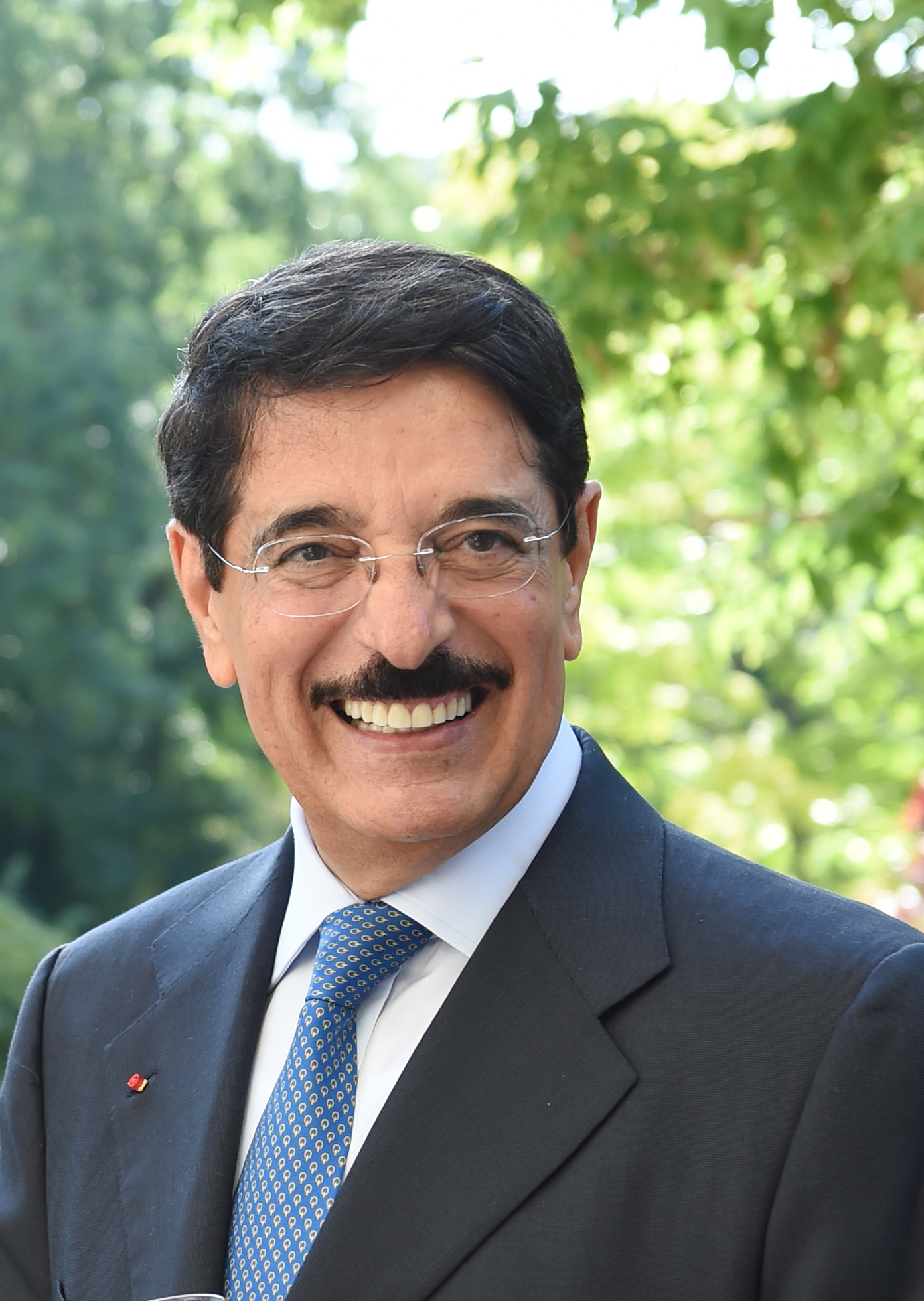
- Al-Kawari in 2015.

Minister of State with rank of Deputy Prime Minister
- Incumbent
- Assumed office February 2016

Minister for Culture, Arts and Heritage of Qatar
- In office 1 July 2008 – February 2016
- Prime Minister: Abdullah bin Nasser bin Khalifa Al Thani

Personal details
- Born: 1 January 1948 (age 78) Al Ghariyah, Qatar
- Education: Faculty of Dar al-Ulum, Saint Joseph University, Paris-Sorbonne University, Stony Brook University
- Website: https://hamadalkawari.com

Hamad Bin Abdulaziz Al-Kuwari (Arabic: حمد بن عبد العزيز الكوّاري; born 1 January 1948) is a Qatari diplomat and politician. Dr. Al-Kuwari serves as State Minister with rank of Deputy Prime Minister. He is currently President of Qatar National Library and was formerly the Minister of Culture, Arts and Heritage of Qatar (2008-2016). He was previously the Ambassador of Qatar to France, the United States, United Nations Educational, Scientific and Cultural Organization and the UN. Dr. Al-Kuwari was a candidate in 2017 election of the director-general of UNESCO. He is married and the father of three children.

== Biography ==
=== Education ===
Hamad bin Abdulaziz Al-Kuwari holds a bachelor's degree in Arabic and Islamic studies from Cairo University (Faculty of Dar al-Ulum), which he obtained in 1970. He also holds a master's degree Diploma from Saint Joseph Jesuit University in Beirut which he attended between 1974 and 1977. He then studied political philosophy at Paris-Sorbonne University in Paris in 1980 and completed a PhD in Political science at the Stony Brook University (New York) in 1990. He speaks Arabic, English and French.

=== Career ===
==== Early career and diplomacy ====
Between 1972 and 1974, he started his diplomatic career as chargé d'affaires in Lebanon. He was appointed ambassador of Qatar in Syria from 1974 to 1979 then in France (1979–84). During that time he was also non-resident ambassador in Greece, Italy, Spain and Switzerland. From 1984 to 1990, he was Qatar's ambassador next the Headquarters of the United Nations while also running the non-resident embassies to Argentina, Brazil and Canada. He was then appointed ambassador to the United States (1990–92) and non-resident ambassador to Mexico and Venezuela.

==== Ministerial functions ====
Dr Hamad Al-Kuwari was appointed Qatar's Minister of Information and Culture in 1992. Between 1992 and 1996 he brought an end to censorship regulations on newspapers and publications, and in 1997 closed the doors of the Ministry of Information.

This initiative expanding the freedom of information would eventually lead to the creation of the Doha Centre for Media Freedom in 2007.

He was appointed Minister for Culture, Arts and Heritage on July 1, 2008. He was the first person to ever hold this position. In 2010, he presided at the 17th Conference of Arab Ministers of Culture.

Whilst in office, Doha was named the 2010 Arab Capital of Culture.

2012 marked the launch of the "Year of Culture" initiative, launched to foster cooperation and exchanges between Qatar and other partner countries. Partners include the United Kingdom (2012), Japan (2013), Brazil (2014), Turkey (2015), China (2016) and Germany (2017). This project is a collaboration between the two main Qatari cultural institutions, the Qatar Museums Authority and the Ministry of Culture, Arts and Heritage. The board is co-chaired by Sheikha Al-Mayassa Al Thani and Dr Hamad Al-Kuwari.

In February 2016, Dr. Al-Kuwari was named as an adviser at the Amiri Diwan (the Royal Palace of Qatar).

==== Functions in International Organisations ====
From 1979 to 1984, he was the ambassador to France as well as the reprensentant for Qatar at UNESCO.

During his tenure as ambassador to the United Nations from 1984 to 1990, Hamad bin Abdulaziz Al-Kuwari also represented Qatar as official delegate to the UN for the country. During that time, he was simultaneously elected deputy chairman of the General Assembly of the United Nations at its fortieth session and chairman of the Special Political Committee (4th Committee) at its 42nd session.

In 1987, he was elected vice president of the Committee Against Apartheid and member of the trustee board of directors of the "Dag Hammarskjöld" Commemoration. He has also represented Qatar at the conferences of the Non-Aligned Movement. From 1997 to 2014, he was member of the advisory board of the Cooperation Council for the Arab States of the Gulf (GCC).

In 2012, he presided at the UNCTAD XIII 2012 (United Nations Conference on Trade and Development). In September 2012, Dr Hamad Al-Kuwari was elected honorary chairman of the 25th Universal Postal Congress.

Passionate about the French language and culture, he presided over Qatar's delegation to l'Organisation internationale de la Francophonie (OIF) in the Democratic Republic of the Congo in 2012, which accepted Qatar as an associated member in the Organisation.

== Other functions ==
- Member of the Consultative Authority for the High Council of GCC.
- Member of the board of directors of the Rand-Qatar Policy Institute.
- Co-founder and chairman of the advisory council of the Doha Center for Media Freedom.
- President of Higher Committee for 2010 Arab Capital of Culture.
- Head of the Committee of State Awards, Qatar.
- Head of the Committee of Qatar Award for Child Literature.
- Co-founder of the Arab World Institute, established in 1980.
- Chairman of the Qatar Businessmen Association (2008).
- Vice Chairman of “Al-Jazeera” and managing director
- Member of the board of trustees of Qatar National Library
- Co-Chairman of the Consultative Board of North Western University in Qatar

== Distinctions ==
- Awarded the 25th of October 2017 by the Emir of Qatar the Ribbon of Hamad Bin Khalifa Al Thani, the highest Qatari distinction.
- Awarded PhD Honoris Causa by the University of Rome Tor Vergata.
- Awarded “Man of the Arab Heritage 2016" by the Arab Centre for Tourism Media in recognition of his efforts to preserve Arab history and heritage.
- Decorated with the French honorific Ordre des Arts et des Lettres, in 2014.
- Decorated with the French "Légion d'Honneur", title of Commander, in 1984.
- Presented with National Order of Merit by the President of the French Republic in 1980.
- Presented with Badges of Honour by Italy, Spain, Syria and Jordan.
- Decorated with a medal from the Queen of The Netherlands.
- Decorated with the Polish Golden Medal for Merit to Culture – Gloria Artis.

== Publications ==
- Dialectics of Conflicts and Settlements (Jadal Al-Maarik Wa Al-Teswiyat): Cairo: Dar Al-Moustaqbal Al-Arabi, 2001
- The Deficient Knowledge (Al-Maarifa Al-Naqisa): Beirut: Reyadh Al-Rayes, 2005
- Global Majlis: Qatar: HBKU Press, 2016

== See also ==
- Culture of Qatar
- Public art in Qatar
