= Abdulrahman bin Hamad bin Jassim bin Hamad Al Thani =

Qatari politician

Sheikh Abdulrahman bin Hamad bin Jassim bin Hamad Al Thani
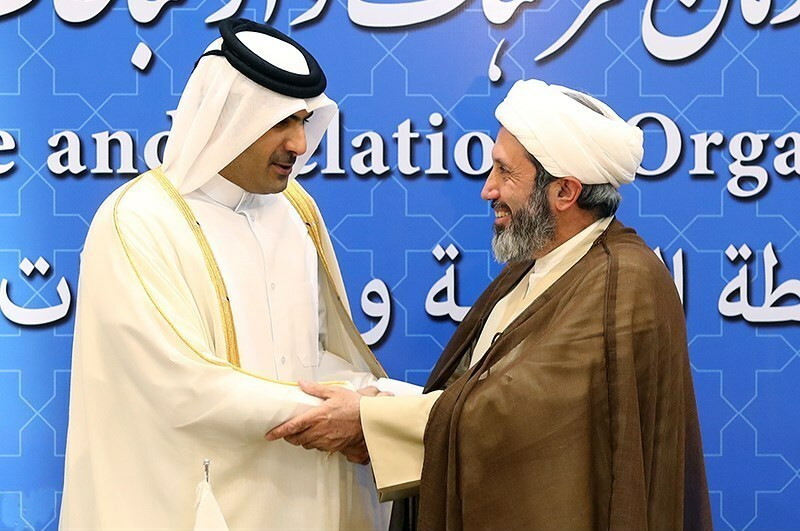
- Abdulrahman bin Hamad bin Jassim bin Hamad Al Thani (left, 2022)

Minister of Culture
- Incumbent
- Assumed office 19 October 2021
- Monarch: Tamim bin Hamad Al Thani
- Prime Minister: Khalid bin Khalifa bin Abdul Aziz Al Thani
- Preceded by: Salah bin Ghanem al-Ali

Personal details
- Education: Qatar University (BA)

Abdulrahman bin Hamad bin Jassim bin Hamad Al Thani is the Qatari Minister of Culture. He was appointed as minister on 19 October 2021.

== Education ==
Al Thani holds a Bachelor in Mass Communication from Qatar University.

== Career ==
Between 2006 and 2010, Al Thani was the head of the Gulf and Arab Monitoring Department at the Ministry of Culture. In addition, he was a member of the Doha Capital of Culture Committee in 2010. From 2010 until 2014, he worked at the office of the Crown Prince at the Amiri Diwan of the State of Qatar. He also worked as the director of the Media Development Department at Qatar Media Corporation from 2011 until 2014. From 2014 until 2021, he was the chief executive officer of the Qatar Media Corporation.
