= Meshal bin Hamad Al Thani =

Qatari diplomat

His Excellency Meshal bin Hamad bin Al Thani

Ambassador of Qatar to the United States
- Incumbent
- Assumed office December 2016
- Monarch: Tamim bin Hamad Al Thani
- Preceded by: Mohammed Jaham Al Kuwari

Personal details
- Children: 3
- Education: American University

Sheikh Meshal bin Hamad Al Thani is the State of Qatar ambassador to the United States of America.

== Education ==
Al Thani earned a Master's degree in international relations from the American University in Washington, DC.

== Diplomatic career ==
Al Thani started his diplomatic career in May 1997 at the Department of European and American Affairs at the Ministry of Foreign Affairs where he stayed until August 1998. Following his service at the Ministry of Foreign Affairs he joined the Qatari Mission to the UN in New York, where he remained till September 2000. From October 2000 to October 2004, he served as a member of the Qatari diplomatic mission in Washington D.C. In November 2004 he became a member of the Qatari diplomatic mission in the Belgian capital, where he acted as the Qatari Liaison with NATO. After his service as Ambassador of Qatar to Brussel, from October 2007 to July 2011, Al Thani served as the Permanent Representative of the State of Qatar to the United Nations till October 2013. The next three years he was the Qatari Ambassador to France. Since 2016, Al Thani has been the ambassador of the State of Qatar to the United States of America.

On 15 January 2021, Al Thani launched the Qatar-USA 2021 Year of Culture as the host of a concert with the Minister of Culture and Sports of Qatar Salah bin Ghanem Al Ali and Greta C. Holtz, Chargé d’affaires of the United States Embassy in Qatar. This concert marked the start of a year of special curated exhibitions and bilateral exchanges in both countries. In the same month Al Thani received the Medal of Distinguished Public Service from the United States Department of Defense.

He is a member of the Metropolitan Club of the City of Washington DC.

== Publications ==
- The World Cup gave Qatar an opportunity to enhance worker protections, The Washington Post, 2022
- Qatar's Ambassador on why the Middle East deserves the opportunity to host soccer's biggest event, CNN, 2022

== Personal life ==
HH Meshal Al Thani is married with three children. He has a son is called Mohammad bin Meshal Al Thani and 2 Daughters, however the daughter’s names are yet to be found.
