= 2009 Arab Capital of Culture =

- Dates: 2009
- Locations: "al-Quds" (Jerusalem), Bethlehem, Gaza, Nazareth, Mar Elias refugee camp
- Website: http://www.alquds2009.org/english.php

Al-Quds Arab Capital of Culture (Arabic: القدس عاصمة الثقافة العربية, romanized: Al-Quds ʻĀṣimat al-Thaqāfah al-ʻArabīyah) was the name given to Arab Capital of Culture programme in 2009. The programme, organised by UNESCO and the Arab League, is designed to promote Arab culture and encourage cooperation in the Arab world. The 2009 event was the 14th programme since its establishment in 1996.

Al-Quds is the Arabic name for Jerusalem, the proclaimed capital of the State of Palestine, although the seat of government and de facto capital is Ramallah. Many of the events were held in the Palestinian territories controlled by the Palestinian National Authority. The opening event scheduled for January 2009 was delayed due to the Gaza War. It was held on March 21, 2009.

== Launching of the events ==
Palestinian President Mahmoud Abbas officially launched the celebration of Jerusalem as the Capital of Arab Culture for 2009 at a ceremony in Bethlehem. Simultaneous ceremonies were supposed to take place in Jerusalem, Gaza, Nazareth and Mar Elias refugee camp in Lebanon. These synchronized celebrations in five locations reflect the desire of building a cultural bridge between the Palestinian people in Palestine and the Palestinians in the diaspora. Israeli Internal Security Minister Avi Dichter instructed police to suppress PNA-sponsored events calling Jerusalem the "capital of Arab culture" because they constituted a violation of the interim agreement, which includes a clause stating that the PA is prohibited from organizing events in Israeli territory.

On Dichter's orders, police shuttered eight planned events and detained twenty organizers and participants for questioning. The blocked events included a soccer match scheduled at a school on Nablus Road, a conference for young women at the Al-Hiya'la Center, and marches in the Wadi al-Joz and Sheikh Jarrah neighborhoods. In addition, a group of Arab students was blocked from rallying at the Temple Mount with PLO flags. A similar ceremony was blocked on the Haroun al-Rashid road. Events in Ras al-Amud and al-Tur were also shut down.

== Reactions to the Israeli ban ==
- Palestinian president Mahmoud Abbas condemned the ban, emphasizing that "there will be no peace without Jerusalem."
- Knesset member Ahmad Tibi said: "I guess the occupation feels threatened by the Palestinian culture and narrative. This is a struggle between occupying police and the songs of freedom and the song will win in the end."
- Nazareth mayor Ramiz Jaraisy said: "I never thought they [Israeli authorities] would take it this far. After all, this is a cultural event." The mayor said Dichter was made aware of the planned festivities as early as March 11 but decided to wait nine days before issuing the order "to prevent a public outcry and legal action on our part. Dichter is trying to compete with (Yisrael Beiteinu Chairman) Avigdor Lieberman's anti-Arab trend, and anyone who holds democracy and freedom of expression dear must condemn his position," he said.
- As a reaction on the Israeli ban, the Dutch composer Merlijn Twaalfhoven initiated Al Quds Underground Festival. Palestinian and international artists created around 150 small theatre and music events in living rooms across the Old City. Access to the festival was on invitation only to avoid problems with the Israeli authorities. In 2010, the festival saw its second edition.

== In the Gaza Strip ==
The logo used by media in the Gaza Strip

Spokesperson of the Ministry of the Interior Ihab al-Ghussein said that the celebrations for Al-Quds Arab Capital of Culture in March at the headquarters of the Palestinian Legislative Council in Gaza. Abbas accused Hamas of blocking celebrations.

== In Denmark ==
Events took place on September 26 and 27 in Denmark. This celebration, the only one outside the Arab world, included more than 40 Palestinian artists, among them the hip hop group Ramallah Underground, the folklore dance troupe El Funoun, the Oriental Music Ensemble, visual artist Rana Bishara, and film director Larissa Sansour who presented her film A Space Exodus (reviewed by Professor Helga Tawil Souri). They were also joint cultural productions produced with prominent Danish artists, as well as a bazaar showcasing cultural products and Palestinian cuisine.
