= Merlijn Twaalfhoven =

Dutch composer (born 1976)

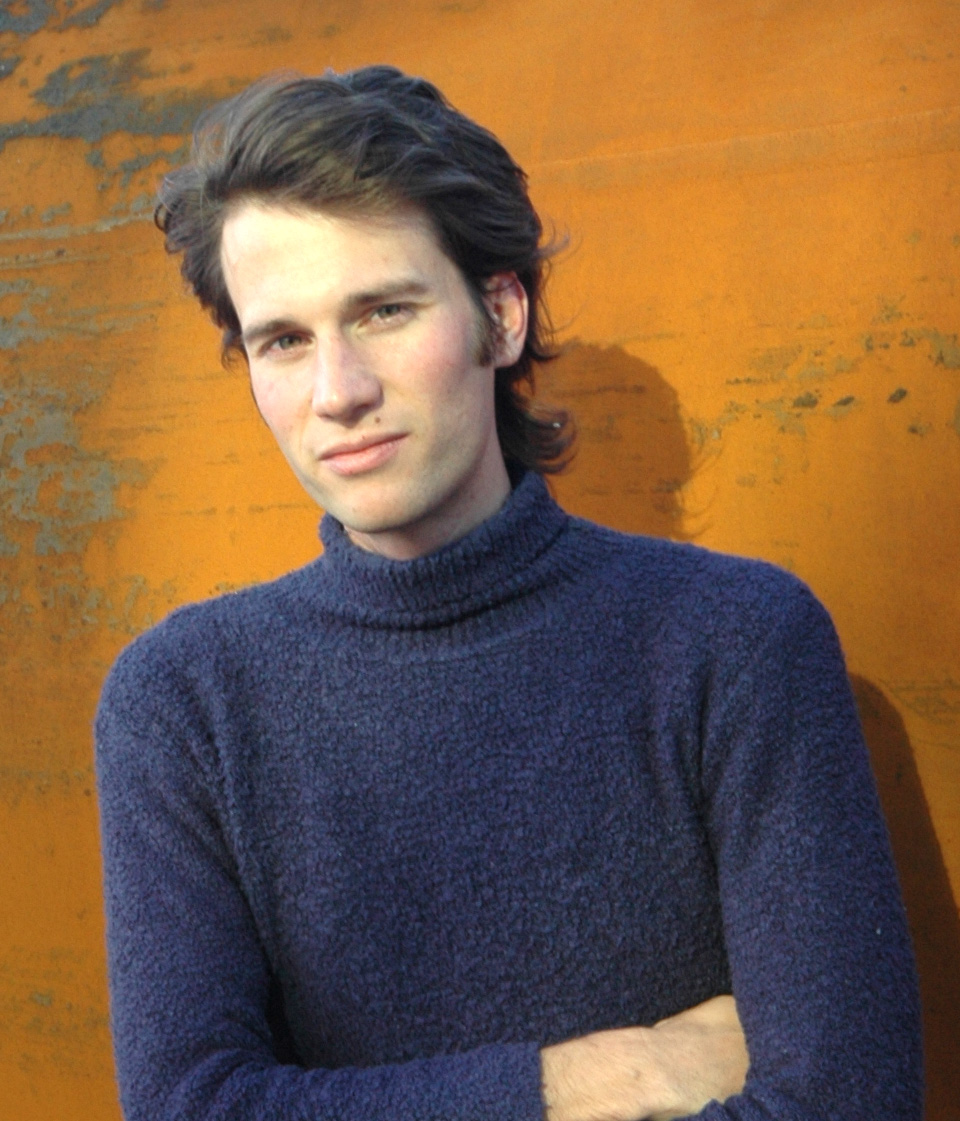
- Photo by Poike Stomps
- Born: Merlijn Twaalfhoven; February 14, 1976 (age 50); Wasperveen, The Netherlands
- Education: Conservatory of Amsterdam
- Known for: Composer, Musician
- Website: https://merlijntwaalfhoven.com

Merlijn Twaalfhoven is a Dutch composer, speaker, writer, and designer of music projects. In his works he explores latitude, imagination, and a role for art in social issues such as inequality, and the transition to a sustainable society. He has designed numerous unconventional music and theater projects and has worked in conflict areas and refugee camps. He also wrote the Dutch book: "Het is aan ons" (it's up to us), Why We Need the Artist Within to Save the World. (Atlas Contact, 2020).

== Early life and career ==
Twaalfhoven was born and grew up in Wapserveen, the son of musical parents. As a high school student, he participated in the art competition for Dutch youth "Kunstbende", performing his own compositions. He remains a member of Kunstbende Originals to this day. He also performed at the Shakespeare Theater in Diever.

In 1996, he toured Bosnia as a violist with the Ricciotti Ensemble, shortly after the Balkan War. The orchestra was accompanied by Dutch IFOR soldiers and performed for orphans, among others.

Twaalfhoven studied viola and composition (under Daan Manneke) at the Amsterdam Conservatory, with a specific interest in improvisation, ethnomusicology, and contemporary music with South Indian techniques. While still at the conservatory, he designed and organized concerts in unusual locations, often in collaboration with actors and dancers.

For his graduation project, he wrote an interactive essay on Japanese aesthetics, titled "De Veelte", and organised a major event in the former ADM shipyard.

Between 2004 and 2008, he was a lecturer at ArtEZ University of the Arts, where, under the class of PopKunst, he conducted research into how contemporary art can reach a broad audience without artistic concessions.

He is known for large-scale multidisciplinary music projects that often involve dancers, visual artists, amateur musicians, and children. With such projects, he toured Central Europe in 2004 as part of Thinking Forward, the cultural program of the Dutch EU presidency.

That year, he also performed the musical opening of the Dutch embassy in Cyprus. It was there that the idea was born to compose a piece that could be played on both sides of the buffer zone that divided the island. In 2005, on the 60th anniversary of the United Nations, it was performed with pupils, students, and professional musicians. Australian filmmaker Adam Sèbire made the documentary Echoes Across the Divide about this project.

Twaalfhoven worked on projects in Palestine, Jordan, and Syria. These projects often involved children from refugee camps or UNRWA schools. Between 2009 and 2012, he organised the hidden festival Al Quds Underground in living rooms of the Old City of Jerusalem. Participants included Dutch theatre makers Laura van Dolron, Gable Roelofs, and Adelheid Roosen. The first edition was initially supposed to take place as part of Al Quds Arab Capital of Culture, but this was banned by Israeli authorities. This prompted the festival to be held underground.

In 2009, he organised the benefit event "Music for Gaza" at Paradiso, Amsterdam, and 013, Tilburg, and in 2013, he organised a benefit concert for Syria at Paradiso, Amsterdam.

In 2014, he composed the musical theater production Postcards from Aleppo, based on handwritten postcards from besieged Aleppo, together with Syrian musicians and writer Abdelkader Benali.

As part of the Holland Festival's "Save the Bassoon" program, Twaalfhoven composed "Grand Subphonia for an immense number of bassoons." It was performed in 2016 by Bram van Sambeek, Pascal Gallois, and 274 other bassoonists during the Holland Festival Proms in the main hall of the Concertgebouw Amsterdam.

He is one of the fifty composers in the Kronos Quartet's "Fifty for the Future" project, which premiered at the 2016 Holland Festival.

By invitation of UN SDSN, Twaalfhoven performed at the Concert for a Sustainable Planet event at Carnegie Hall with Yo Yo Ma, Gloria Benedikt, Jeffrey Sachs, and members of the New York Philharmonic.

In 2017, he founded The Turn Club, a collaborative group of artists whose practice is firmly rooted in the dutch society. Through this, he develops projects and methods, such as the Academy for Uncertainty Skills, the Future Election, the Place Consultation, the National Listening Campaign, and Seasonal Conversations.

As a speaker, writer, and trainer, Twaalfhoven regularly gives performances and lectures in which he connects principles from artistic practices to complex social issues.

His works have been performed by the Kronos Quartet, Tokyo Symphony Orchestra, Radio Philharmonic Orchestra, Netherlands Philharmonic Orchestra, Holland Symfonia, the Radio Chamber Orchestra, Radio Symphony Orchestra, the Royal Symphony Orchestra of Flanders, Orchestra della Svizzera Italiana, the Dutch Ballet Orchestra, the Asko Ensemble, Percussion Group The Hague, the Conservatory Orchestra of Amsterdam, the Escher Ensemble, the Amstel Saxophone Quartet, the Lendvai Trio and the Ricciotti Ensemble, among others.

== Music projects ==
- La Nuit n’est pas un Chocolat With among others Värttina, Asko-Schoenberg, Lena Willemark, Royal Wind Music, children's choir, fanfare, DJ’s, dansers, chefs. Various editions (2001-2004)
- La Nuit d’Europe Editions in Amsterdam, Prague, Bratislava and Ljubljana (2004)
- Traffique megacomposition with 400 brass players, Uitmarkt, Lowlands (2004)
- Night in The Barents Sea Blindfolded Theatre experience in Stadsschouwburg Amsterdam in collaboration with Toneelgroep Amsterdam (2004)
- Long Distance Call, Nicosia, Cyprus (2005)
- DroomZomerNacht Music theatre & community project, Hembrugterrein Zaandam (2007)
- Station East Musicfestival in Roma-neighbourhood of Prešov, Slovakia (2007)
- Carried by the Wind, Ramallah and Bethlehem, Palestine (2008)
- Symphony for All, Amman, Jordan (2008)
- Symphony Arabica, various cities in The Netherlands (2008)
- Coming Together, Damascus, Syria (2010)
- Al Quds Underground festival on 12 locations in Jerusalem, Palestine (2009-2012)

== Works ==
=== Compositions ===
- GUSH. of: Die Mündigkeit des selbstverschuldeten Ausgangs, Symphony orchestra or Fanfare orchestra, 11', (2000)
- Winter in April, recorder and electronics, 8', (2000)
- Heronthechting, chamber orchestra, 10', (2000, rev. 2001)
- If you reveal your secrets to the wind, you should not blame the wind for revealing them to the trees, violinconcert and chamber orchestra, 12', (2000-2002)
- De vrucht van de dag is de klacht van een snaar, viola, alto flute, clarinet, harpsichord and percussion, 7', (1999 revision 2002)
- Lied voor een man die zijn taal vergat, chamber orchestra, 12', (2003)
- Alexei larionov, a requiem, Symphony orchestra, choir, vocal soloists, actors, extra's, 30’, (2003)
- Stoned Soul Picknick, Fanfare orchestra, 13', (2003)
- Sneeuw doet de zee geen pijn, Harmony Orchestra, 10’, (2003)
- Batiment Passager, symphony Orchestra, 14’, (2004)
- Show me how the Swallow flies, counter tenor, piano o choir, 7’, (2004)
- Body reduction, reduction, symphony orchestra, 19’, (2005)
- Serendip, string orchestra 66542, 15’, (2005)
- Rugdekking, fl, 3 sax, 2 trp, ho, 3 amateur trp soloists, 6’, (2005)
- 1 Gram of time, saxofone quartet, 10’, (2005)
- Symfonie voor Iedereen, chamber orchestra, amateurs, students and public, 40’, (2006)
- Rituell, chamber choir, 8’, (2007)
- On Parole, trio and string quartet with extra players, 14’ (2015)
- Grand Subphonia, a lot of bassoons, 50’, (2016)
- Play, string quartet, 8’ (2016)

=== Work for Theatre ===
- Hamlet by Ola Mafalani for Northern Dutch Theatre (2012)

=== Work for Dance ===
- Acces All Areas: 4 pieces of music with choreographies by Reida Benteifour and Ashley Page for the National Ballet and Percussion group The Hague in the Music Theatre. (2000)
- Double points: Bertha; by dance group Emio Greco|PC, o.a. festival springdance, Utrecht, (2003)
- Body by Ted Brandsen for the National Ballet / Holland Festival. (2004)
- Contextual Matters for dancers Gloria Benedikt and Mimmo Miccolis and ensemble, (2017)

== Events and compositions ==
- La Vie Urbaine, 2001

Performance at the Old church, Amsterdam

- La Nuit n'est pas un Chocolat, 2002-2006

Night event with dj's, chefs, hairdressers, massage therapists
Performances at Paradiso, Amsterdam, Tivoli in Utrecht, 013 in Tilburg and the Stadsschouwburg Groningen

- Requiem for Alexei Larionov, 2003

Composition for symphony orchestra, actors and large choir in the audience
performance at the Dr. Anton Phillipsvenue en and at the Festival in de Branding

- La Nuit de Bratislava, 2004

Performance in a markethall

- Traffique, 2004

Composition for 400 wind instruments divided in 80 groups around the audience.
Performance during the opening of the Uitmarkt on Museumplein, Amsterdam

- La Nuit d'Europe, 30 December 2004

closing act during the cultural program Thinking Forward in the new EU accession countries, in the context of the Dutch presidency of the EU

- C’est où la Mer, 2005

performance in the dunes, The Netherlands

- Kursk, 2005

Performance in an old Soviet-submarine

- Long Distance Call, 2005

composition for 400 musicians, students and vocalists.
performed on both sides of the Turkish-Greek border in Cyprus

- Symphony for everyone, 2007

Composition for 100 amateur musicians, 80 students and chamber orchestra
performed by o.a. the Dutch Philharmonisch Orkest

- Symphony Arabica, 2008

Performance in Jordan by Palestinian refugees, also performed for DutchTEDx Amsterdam, 2013. The opening was provided by the Groot Omroep Koor with a song consisting out of quotes by TEDxAmsterdam-speakers from earlier, composed and conducted by Merlijn Twaalfhoven. The closing was a collaboration between various artists like Claron McPhadden, the Landfill Harmonic Orchestra, PIPS:lab and others. Visuals by Boompje Studio, composition and directing by Merlijn Twaalfhoven.

- TEDx Amsterdam, 2016

Performances by Merlijn Twaalfhoven with A Postcard from Aleppo and Yuri van Gelder.

== Awards ==
- NOG - Incentive Prize for young composers: “GUSH of: Die Mündigkeit des selbstverschuldeten Ausgangs”. (2000)
- Nomination for the Gaudeamus award (2002)
- Jur Naessens Music award: 2e prize for: La Nuit (2002)
- Laureaat KBC AQUARIUS composition competition (Belgium): If you reveal... (2002)
- Dutch Music Days: Jury prize and Public prize: If you reveal... (2002)
- Honourable Mention 50th International Rostrum of Composers (UNESCO): If you reveal... (2003)
- Youngest lecturer in the Netherlands at ArtEZ University of the Arts. Subject: Pop Art (2004)
- Installed as the first city composer of the Netherlands by the mayor of Zaanstad (September 25, 2006)
- Art and Culture in my neighbourhood Festival: Prize Abroad: Carried by the Wind. (2009)
- Jur Naessens Music Award: 2e prize for: The Air we Breathe. (2011)
- UNESCO-Award Young Artist for intercultural dialogue between the Arab and Western worlds (2011)
- Winner Hogenbijl Music Award (2012)
- Nomination Amsterdam Award for Art (2015)
- Nomination Gieskes-Strijbis Stage Award (2017)
- Winner Dutch National science-quiz – NOW/Vpro, with Angela Maas, (2018)

== Literature ==
=== Original works ===
- Kunst in de wereld (Art in the world), (2009), Merlijn Twaalfhoven, design; Jan Willen den Hartog, Dutch, 80 p. ISBN 978-9089101228
- Het is aan ons (It's up to us), 2020, Merlijn Twaalfhoven, Dutch, 240 p. ISBN 978-9045039800

=== Contribution ===
- Nederland in Ideeën (The Netherlands in ideas), (2013), Tim van Opijnen, Mark Geels, Dutch, 304 p. ISBN 9789490574987
- Dit wil je weten (You want to know this), (2014), Mark Geels, Tim van Opijnen, Dutch, 360 p, ISBN 9789491845352
- Dit is het mooiste ooit (This is the most beautiful thing ever), (2015), Mark Geels, Tim van Opijnen, Dutch, 264 p, ISBN 9789491845529
- Waar verzet jij je tegen? (What are you resisting against?), (2016), Mark Geels, Tim van Opijnen, Dutch, 288 p, ISBN 9789492493026
- Hoop (Hope), (2019), Joris Luyendijk, Mark Geels, Tim van Opijnen, Dutch, 288 p, ISBN 9789492493644

== Other ==
In 2004 Twaalfhoven became the youngest lecturer of The Netherlands at ArtEZ College. His subject was: Popart.

On the 25th of September 2006 Twaalfhoven to installed as the first city composer of The Netherlands by the mayor of Zaanstad.

Twaalfhoven composed “1 minute opera’s” for the Dutch tv show De Wereld Draait Door (BNN VARA)

- https://www.bnnvara.nl/dewerelddraaitdoor/videos/242062
- https://www.bnnvara.nl/dewerelddraaitdoor/videos/249671
- https://www.bnnvara.nl/dewerelddraaitdoor/videos/223215
- https://www.bnnvara.nl/dewerelddraaitdoor/videos/223984
