= The Corcoran School (Georgetown) =

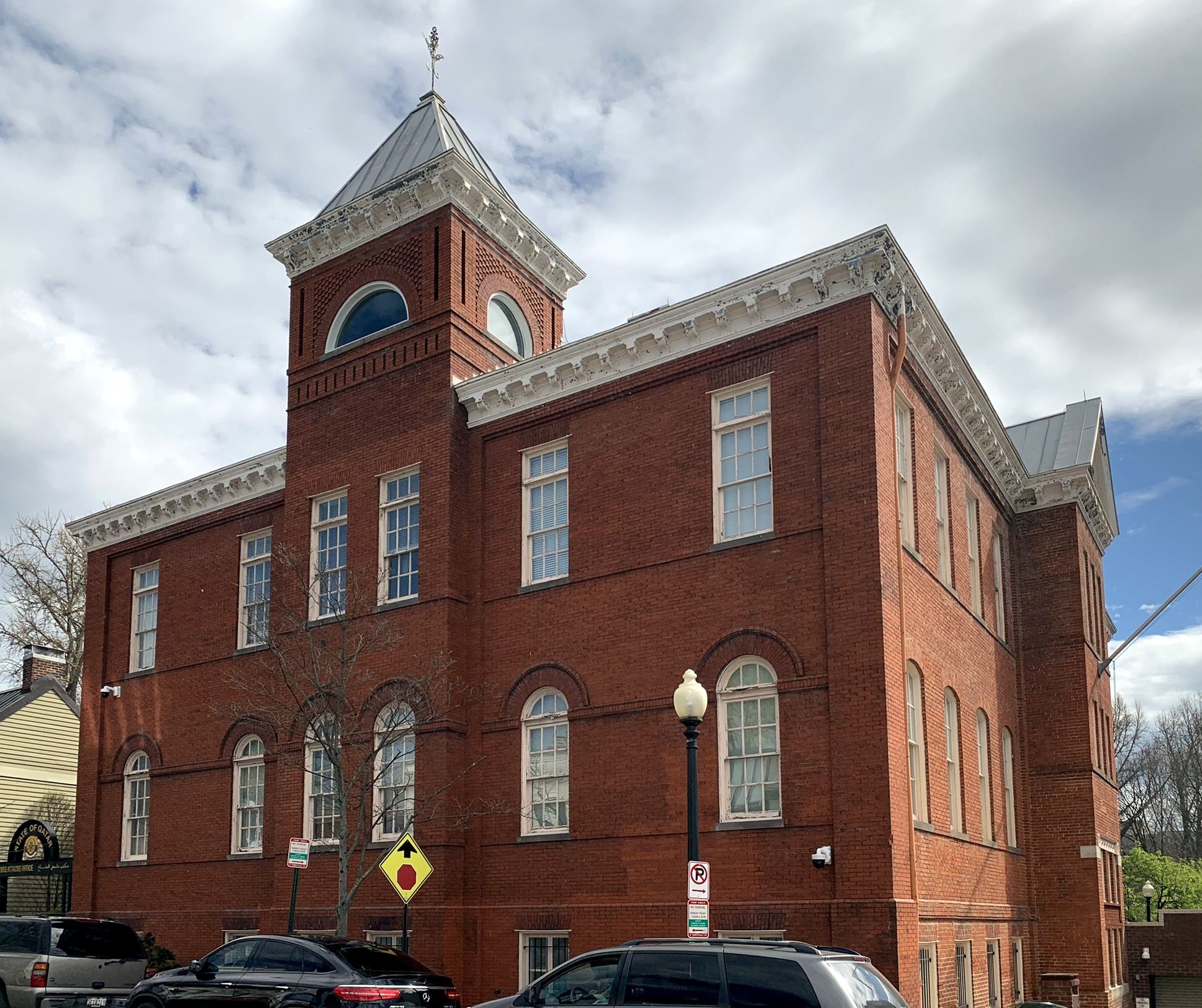
The Corcoran School has housed the Embassy of Qatar's Defense Attaché Office since 2016.

The Corcoran School (built 1889) is a historic building located at 1219 28th Street NW in the Georgetown neighborhood in Washington, D.C. The original school was named for Thomas Corcoran, former mayor of Georgetown, and was developed to accommodate the Caucasian population in the area. The school comprises approximately 24,000 square feet total and sits on a lot that extends down to M Street.

== History ==
Located at 28th and M Streets NW, the building was originally developed as an elementary school in 1889 and operated in that capacity for sixty-two years. It was named after former Georgetown mayor, Thomas Corcoran. Thomas Corcoran's son was William Wilson Corcoran, founder of the well-known Corcoran Gallery of Art in Washington, D.C. It was built as a school for Caucasian children in the area and ran successfully until the mid-1900s because of inability to keep the school full. The school board made the decision to close the school in 1947, but reversed its decision a year later "until it can be determined if extensive building and remodeling of homes in Georgetown will result in increased school attendance by white children". The school ultimately closed in 1950.

Following closure of the school, the city used the building for administrative purposes. In 1981, the city attempted to auction the building off but was unsuccessful, until the Hotel and Restaurant Workers Union purchased it for $1.8 million at an auction in 1982.

== Hotel and Restaurant Workers Union ==
The labor union, now known as UNITE HERE, purchased the building in 1982 to be used as its international headquarters. It outbid Royce Lanier, an architect hoping to restore or lease the school. The Union was founded in 1891 and merged with the Union of Needletrades, Industrial and Textile Employees (UNITE) in 2004 to become UNITE HERE.

== American Road & Transportation Builders Association ==
In 2005, the American Road & Transportation Builders Association (ARTBA) purchased the building from the Hotel and Restaurant Workers Union for $7.3 million. ARTBA was founded in 1902 and lists on its website that it is "the oldest and most respected national transportation construction-related association".

== State of Qatar Ministry of Defense ==
The government of the Qatar, specifically the Qatar Ministry of Defense, purchased the building from ARTBA on December 15, 2016. [x] The final sale price was approximately $17 million.

The purchase follows a pattern of recent Qatari-related investments in Washington, D.C, the capital of the United States. The Club Quarters Hotel was purchased by Doha-based Al Sraiya Holding Group for $52.4 million in early 2016. Prior to that, "Duwaliya US Real Estate Inc. bought 1575 Eye St. NW for $107.9 million about a year ago, the Al Rayyan Tourism Investment Co. bought the St. Regis in 2015 for about $82 million, and the Qatar Investment Authority financed a large portion of CityCenterDC".

The Washington Post reported that CityCenterDC was its first D.C. real estate venture, and it became the primary owner of the project following its investment of $650 million into the development.

In the past, the Qataris have typically focused their investments in London and greater Europe.
