= Mohammed Jaham Al Kuwari =

Qatari diplomat (born 1958)

His Excellency Mohammed Jaham Al Kuwari
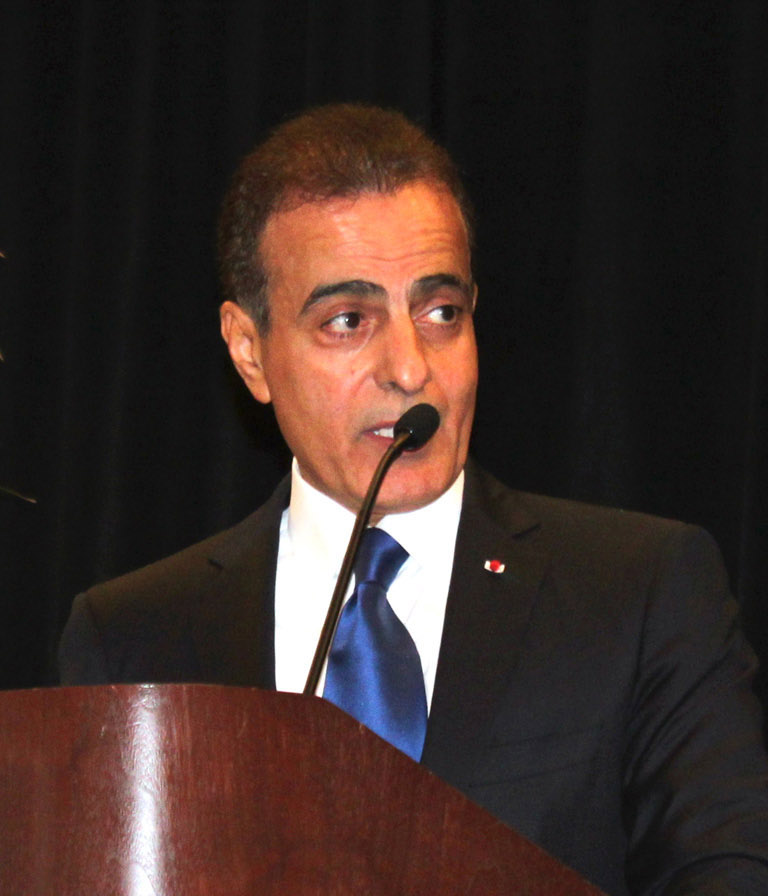

Ambassador of Qatar to Switzerland
- In office March 2014 – December 2016
- Monarch: Tamim bin Hamad Al Thani
- Prime Minister: Abdullah bin Nasser Al Thani
- Preceded by: Mohammed bin Abdullah Al Rumaihi
- Succeeded by: Meshal bin Hamad Al Thani

Personal details
- Born: 20 May 1958 (age 68)
- Children: 5
- Education: University of Portland

Mohammed Jaham Abdulaziz Al Kuwari (Arabic: محمد جهام الكواري, born 20 May 1958) is a Qatari diplomat who has been Ambassador of Qatar to the United States from March 2014 to December 2016.

== Early life and education ==
Born in 1958, he is one of 13 children in the family. He received a bachelor's degree in political science from University of Portland in 1980 and a master's degree in international relations from the University of Madrid in 1990.

== Career ==
Al Kuwari started his career at the Ministry of Foreign Affairs in 1981 as a Third Secretary. He was first posted to Washington DC from 1981 to 1986, and then Madrid from 1986 to 1990. He was then assigned as Chief of the Information Department of the Cooperation Council to the Ministry of Foreign Affairs from 1990 to 1991 and was then posted to Tehran from 1991 to 1992.

Al Kuwari served as Deputy Head of Cabinet from 1993 to 1995, Director of European and American Affairs from 1995 to 1997 and again from 2001 to 2002. He was a member of the Diplomatic Consular Services from 1997 to 2001 and head of delegation of the Qatari political and strategic dialogue with France from 2001 to 2002.

In December 2013, Al Kuwari was appointed to serve as the Ambassador of Qatar in Washington, DC, and officially submitted his credentials as Qatar's Ambassador Extraordinary and Plenipotentiary to the United States to President Barack Obama during the credentials presentation ceremony held at the White House on 10 March 2014.

Prior to his appointment to Washington, Al Kuwari served for a decade as Qatar's Ambassador to France and was accredited to Switzerland and the Holy See. In 2007, he became non-resident Ambassador to Monaco and Portugal.

== Decorations and medals ==
- Chevalier of the Legion of Honour (Paris, 1998)
- Medal of friendly cooperation from the Republic of Bosnia and Herzegovina (1998)
- Grand Cross of the Order of St. Gregory the Great (Vatican City, 2006)
- Officer badge of the Legion of Honour (Paris, 2007)
- Grand Cross of the Order of Merit (Portugal, 2012)
- Commander badge of the Legion of Honour (Paris, 2013)
- Grand Cross of the Order of Isabella the Catholic (Madrid, 2020)
