= 2008 Arab Capital of Culture =

Cultural initiative to promote Arab Culture

- Dates: 2008
- Locations: Damascus, Syria
- Website: http://damascus.org.sy/index.php

The 2008 Arab Capital of Culture was chosen to be Damascus, Syria. The Arab Capital of Culture is an initiative undertaken by UNESCO, under the Cultural Capitals Program, to promote and celebrate Arab culture and encourage cooperation in the Arab region. The preparation for the festivity began in February 2007 with the establishing of the Administrative Committee for “Damascus Arab Capital of Culture" by a presidential decree.

== Events ==
The festival's events included:

=== January ===
- Naseeb, a musical concert by Abed Azrie.

=== February ===
- Sah al-Nom, a musical by the Lebanese legendary diva Fairouz.
- Doxbox: Festival of Documentary Film, the first Documentary film festival in the middle east.
- Opera of Carmen, by Georges Bizet.
- An oud concert by Anouar Brahem.

=== March ===
- A musical concert by the Orchestra of Mari.
- Bahok, a dance performance by Akram Khan.
- House of Cinema, a celebration of Arab cinema.
- World Poetry Day, a series of poetry workshops in celebration of the World Poetry Day.

=== April ===
- A musical concert by Italian opera orchestra I Solisti Veneti.

=== May ===
- Women Sing... Their Voices Converse, a music performance by Arab female musicians at Azm Palace.

=== June ===
- The Return of Ali Bey, a street theatre and music performance about Ali Bey al-Abbasi.
- Just Flamenco, a Flamenco performance by Spanish bailora Isabel Bayon.
- In Tribute to World Refugee Day, a concert by Naseer Shamma.

=== July ===
- World Music Nights, a series of concerts by groups from different parts of the world, with focus on ethnic music. The concerts included Dhafer Youssef, Pink Martini, Faudel, Johnny Clegg, Angelique Kidjo, Lena Chamamyan and Tinariwen.
- Classical Music Nights, a series of classical music concerts in tribute to Solhi al-Wadi.
- The Falcon: Abdulrahman al-Dakhel, a dance show by the Syrian dance group Inana about Abd ar-Rahman I, the first Umayyad Caliphate in Spain.
- Julio Iglesias performing at the Roman theatre of Bosra.

=== August ===
- A series of concerts by the Lebanese musician Ziad Rahbani at the Citadel of Damascus. It was the first time Rahbani performs in Syria.
- The Festival of Oak of Mallajeh, the 12th edition of this annual cultural festival was held under the patronage of Arab Capital of Culture festival.

=== September ===
- Spiritual Music Days, a series of concerts by a number of traditional and spiritual musical groups.
- Memory Club hosts Colette Khoury, an event and talk by the Syrian writer.

=== October ===
- Zenobia, an opera by Luca Antonio Predieri about the Zenobia, the Syrian queen of Palmyra.
- A series of concerts by Lebanese artist Julia Boutros at the Citadel of Damascus.
- An Orient of Palaces: Claude Shaeffer and the Royal Palace of Ugarit, an exhibition at the National Museum of Damascus.

=== November ===
- World Ceramics: Masterpieces from the Victoria and Albert Museum, an exhibition.
- Damascus International Film Festival, in its 16th edition was held under the patronage of the festival.
- Contract, a dance performance by the Myosotis Dance Theatre Group.

=== December ===
- An adaption of A Streetcar Named Desire directed by Ghassan Massoud.
- Aramel on the Bicycle, a play by Jawad al-Assadi.
- And we also love life... a tribute to Mahmoud Darwish, a series of concerts by Lebanese musician Marcel Khalife. The tour included in addition to Damascus concerts in the cities of Latakia, Homs and Aleppo.
