= Mar Elias refugee camp =

Palestinian refugee camp in Beirut, Lebanon

Coordinates: 33°52′38″N 35°29′19″E

Mar Elias (Arabic: مار الياس) is a Palestinian refugee camp in the southwestern part of Beirut, Lebanon.

Largely autonomous, it was originally a Christian Palestinian refugee camp founded in 1952 by the Congregation of St. Elias (Prophet Elijah) to host Palestinian refugees who arrived from the Galilee region after the start of the Nakba in 1948. Many Syrian refugees fleeing the Syrian civil war have also settled in the camp. UNRWA claims that Christians have since become a minority in Mar Elias, while other sources claim they are still the majority.

During the Lebanese Civil War (1975–1990), the Palestinian National Salvation Front (PNSF), a Syrian proxy which opposed the Palestine Liberation Organization (PLO), had its headquarters in Mar Elias camp.
