= Ola Mafaalani =

Syrian-born theater director (born 1968)

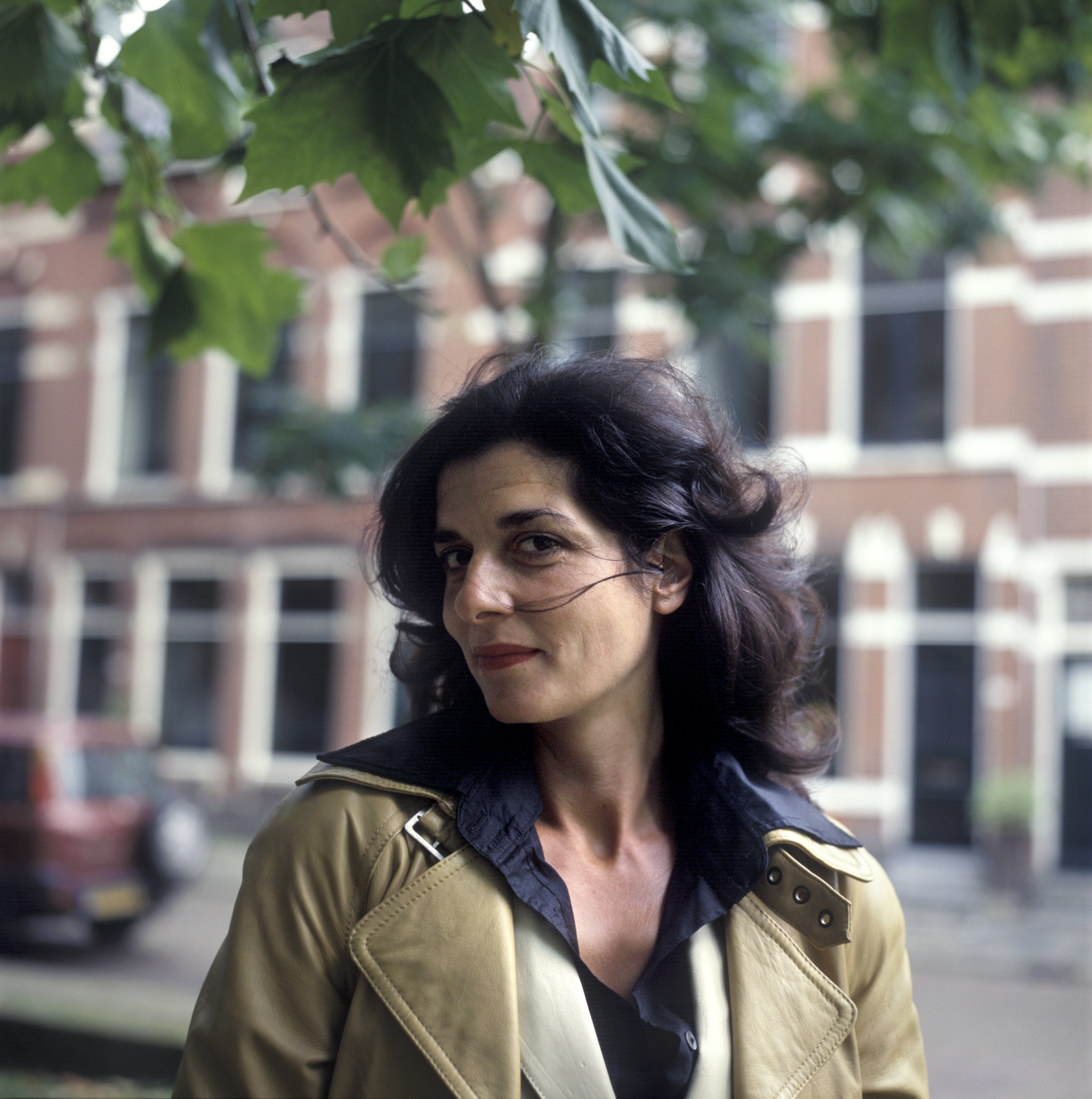

Ola Mafaalani (born 1968) is a Syrian-born theater director. She was the artistic director of the Noord Nederlands Toneel (NNT) in Groningen, in the Netherlands from 2009-2016. Until 2024 she was artistic leader of Female Economy in Amsterdam. She works now again freelance for international stages and locations.

Mafaalani was born in Syria and moved with her family to Germany at age 2, where lived in Bochum and studied film and television. She continued her studies in theater in Amsterdam, and has lived in the Netherlands since 1992. Her first production, Harige Machines ("Hairy machines") was performed in Groningen in 1995, at the Grand Theatre; since then she has worked for the Royal Flemish Theatre, the Kölner Schauspielhaus, and Toneelgroep Amsterdam(now ITA), American Repertory Theatre in Boston, Berliner Ensemble, The National Opera and Ballet in Amsterdam, Dailes in Riga, Het Nationale Theater in Den Hague.

Mafaalani was married to writer and director Ko van den Bosch. Her outspokenness has been the subject of some controversy; when she opened the Dutch Theater Festival in Amsterdam in 2015, her speech was concerned not so much with drama per se but more with her concern about the lack of involvement outside and inside the theater with the European refugee crisis, a point she illustrated by sharing the stage with a hundred refugees.
