= Arab Capital of Culture =

Arab League effort to promote and celebrate Arab culture

The Arab Capital of Culture (Arabic: عاصمة الثقافة العربية, romanized: ʿāṣima ath-thaqāfa al-ʿarabiyya) is an initiative taken by the Arab League under the UNESCO Cultural Capitals Program to promote and celebrate Arab culture and encourage cooperation in the Arab region.

== Cultural capitals ==
Year	City	Participating member
1996	Cairo	Egypt
1997	Tunis	Tunisia
1998	Sharjah	United Arab Emirates
1999	Beirut	Lebanon
2000	Riyadh	Saudi Arabia
2001	Kuwait City	Kuwait
2002	Amman	Jordan
2003	Rabat	Morocco
2004	Sanaa	Yemen
2005	Khartoum	Sudan
2006	Muscat	Oman
2007	Algiers	Algeria
2008	Damascus	Syria
2009	East Jerusalem	Palestine^{[i]}
2010	Doha	Qatar
2011	Sirte	Libya
2012	Manama	Bahrain
2013	Baghdad	Iraq
2014	Tripoli	Libya
2015	Constantine	Algeria
2016	Sfax	Tunisia
2017	Luxor	Egypt
2018	Oujda	Morocco
2019	Port Sudan	Sudan
2020	Bethlehem	Palestine
2021	Irbid	Jordan
2022	Kuwait City	Kuwait
2023	postponed (Note: The planned cultural capital was Tripoli, Lebanon; however, due to the effects of the Lebanese liquidity crisis. Awarding delayed to 2024.)	
2024	Tripoli	Lebanon
2025	Kuwait City	Kuwait
2026	Benghazi	Libya

== Map ==
Arab Capital of Culture. Green designates current cities; red is for past cities; and blue for future cities.

== Gallery ==
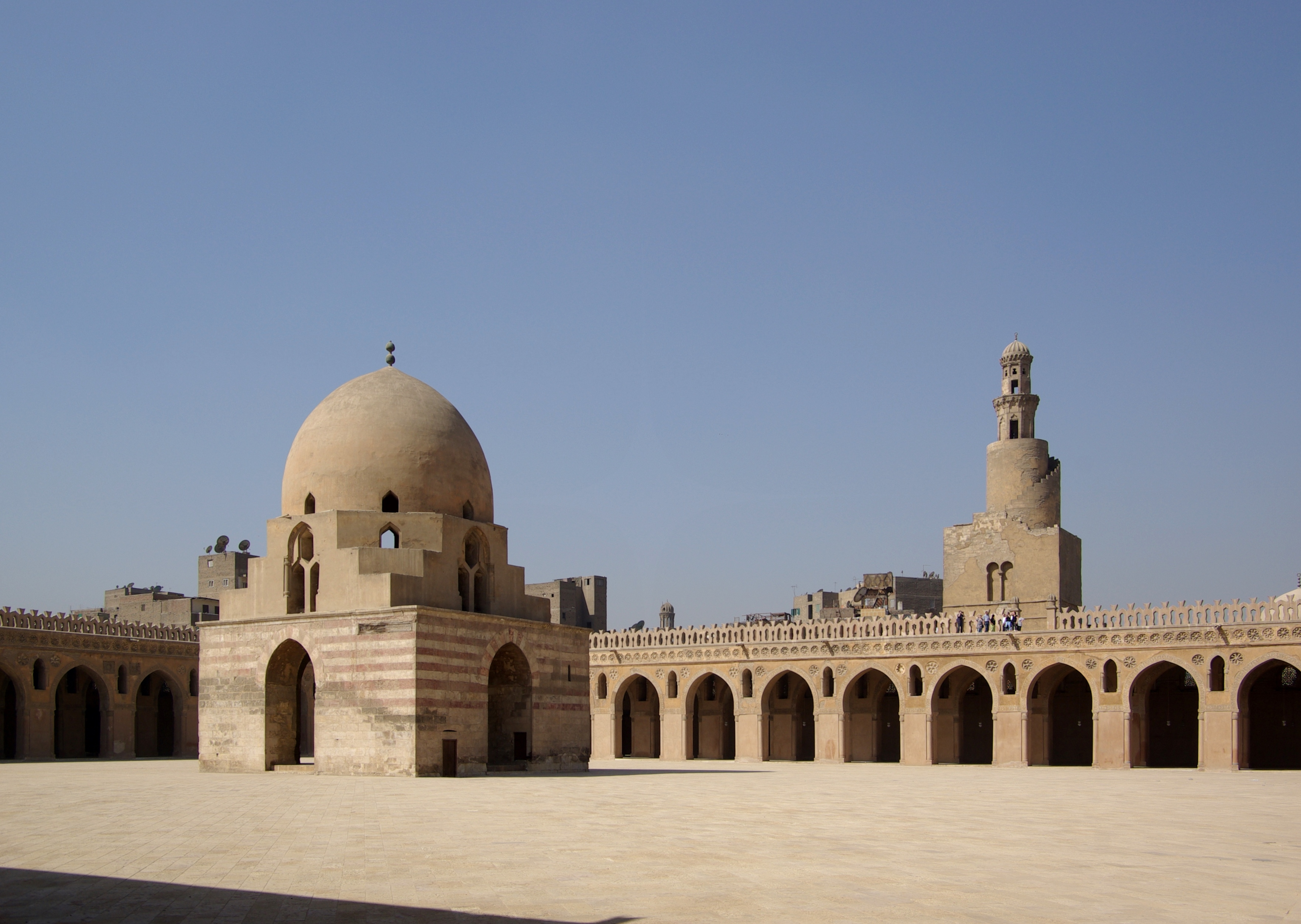
Cairo, Arab Capital of Culture 1996 for Egypt

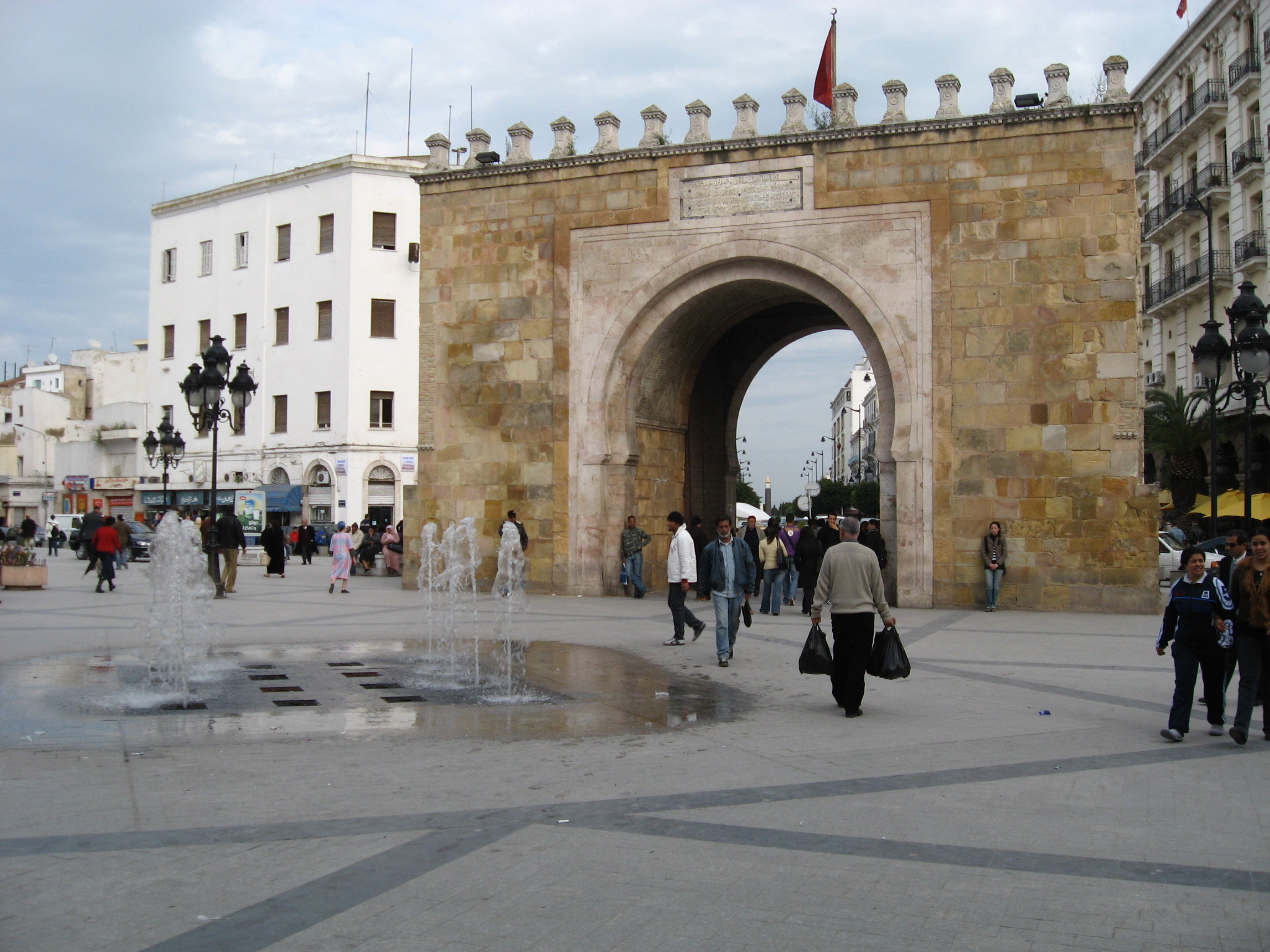
Tunis, Arab Capital of Culture 1997 for Tunisia

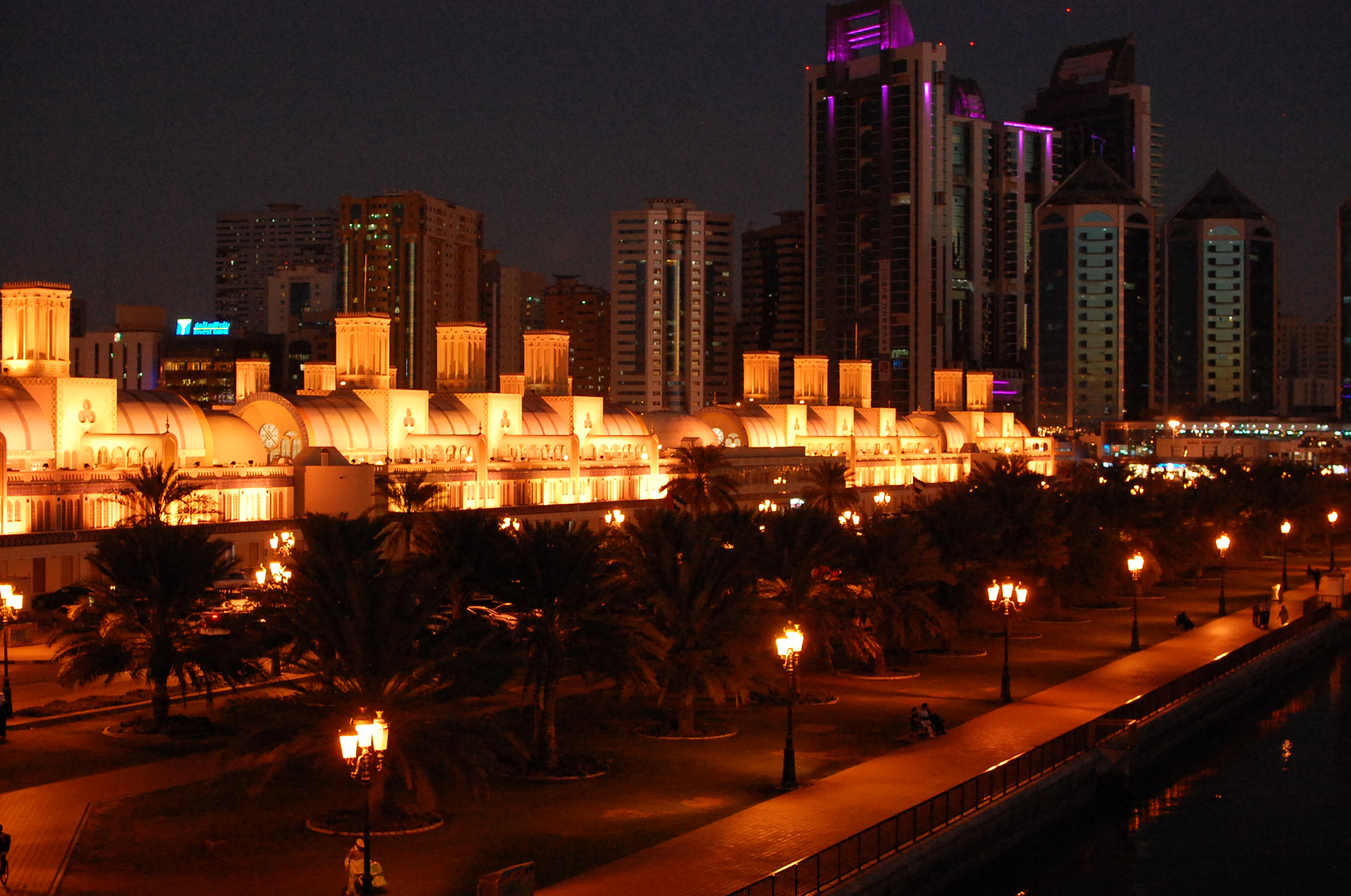
Sharjah, Arab Capital of Culture 1998 for the United Arab Emirates

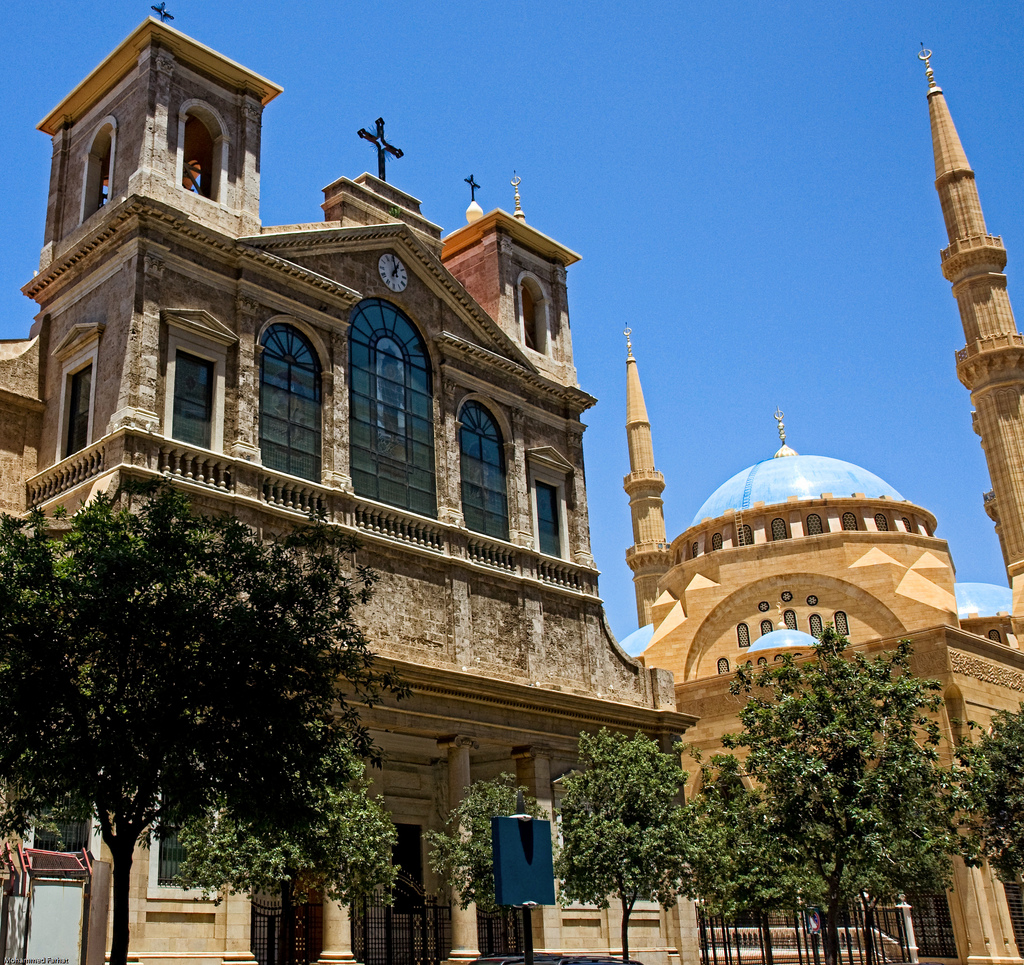
Beirut, Arab Capital of Culture 1999 for Lebanon.

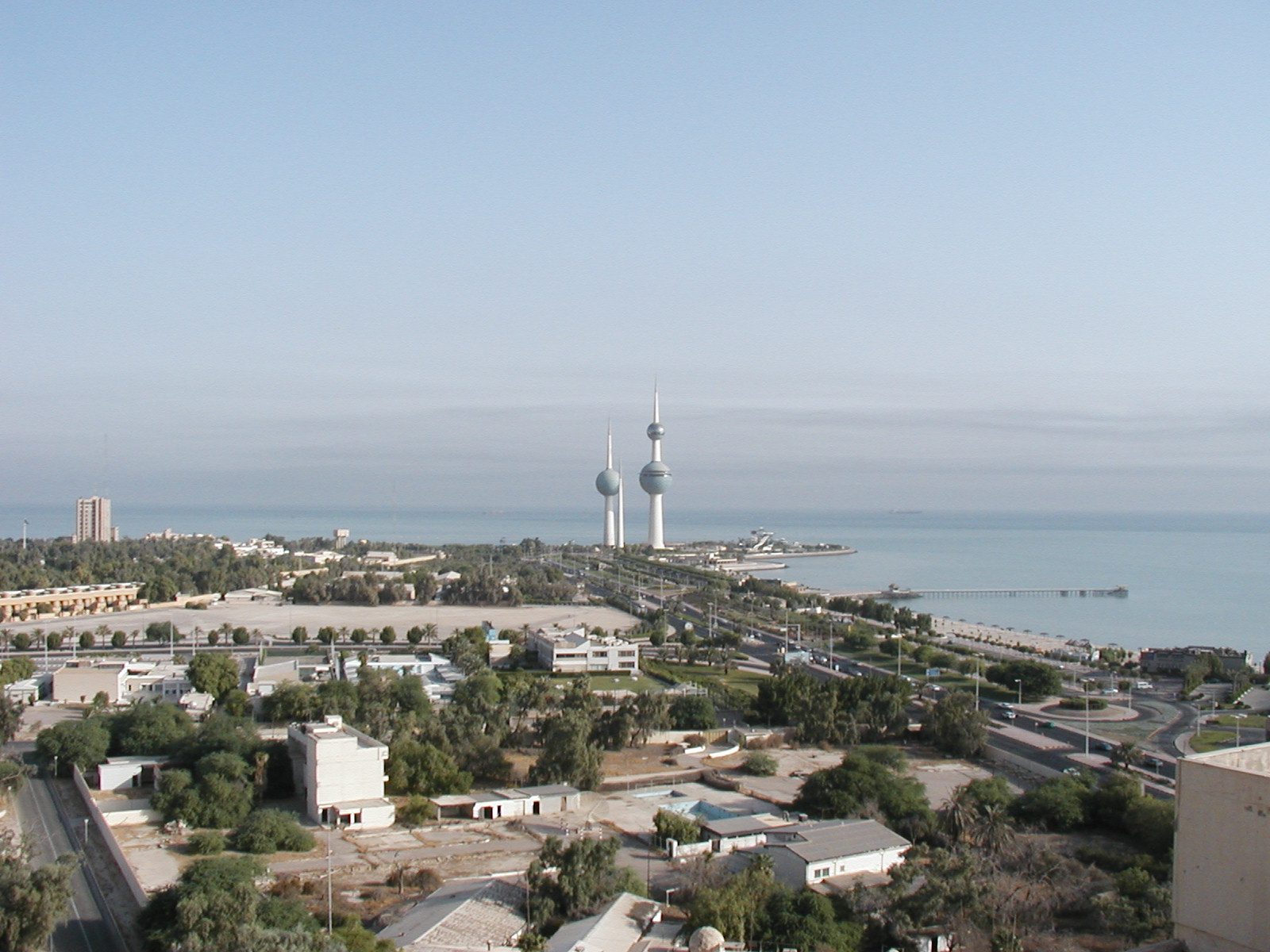
Kuwait, Arab Capital of Culture 2001 and 2022 for Kuwait.

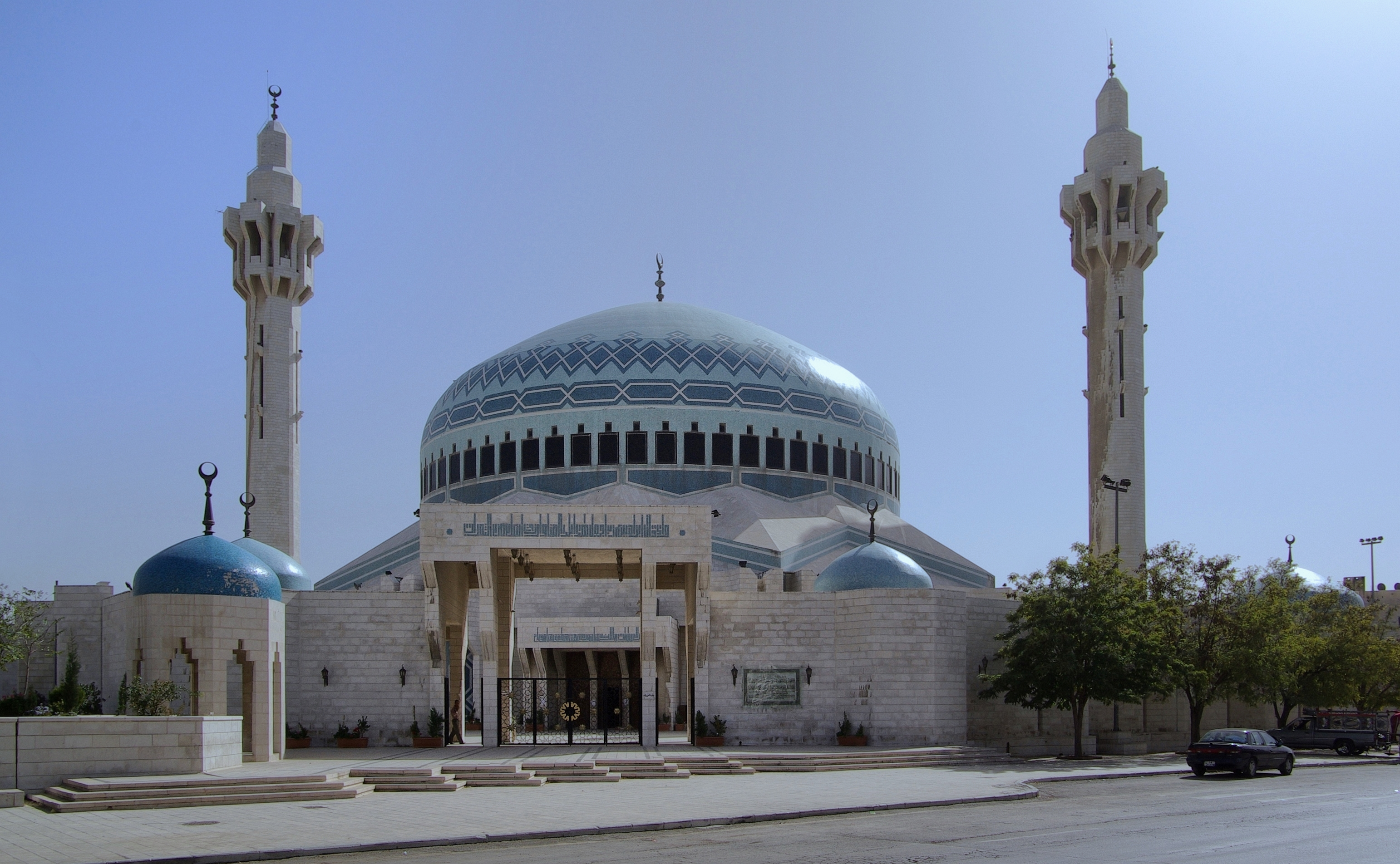
Amman, Arab Capital of Culture 2002 for Jordan.

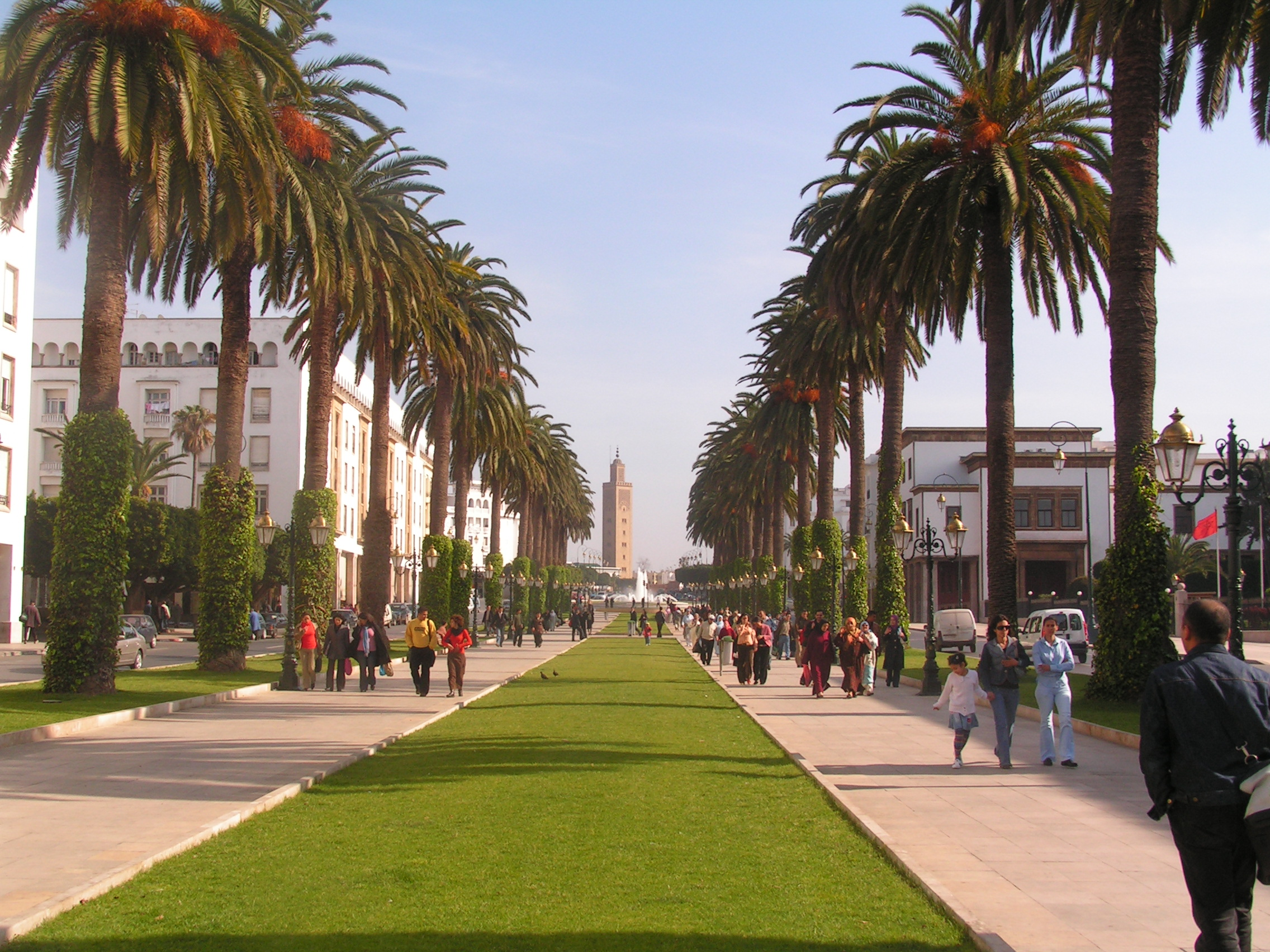
Rabat, Arab Capital of Culture 2003 for Morocco.

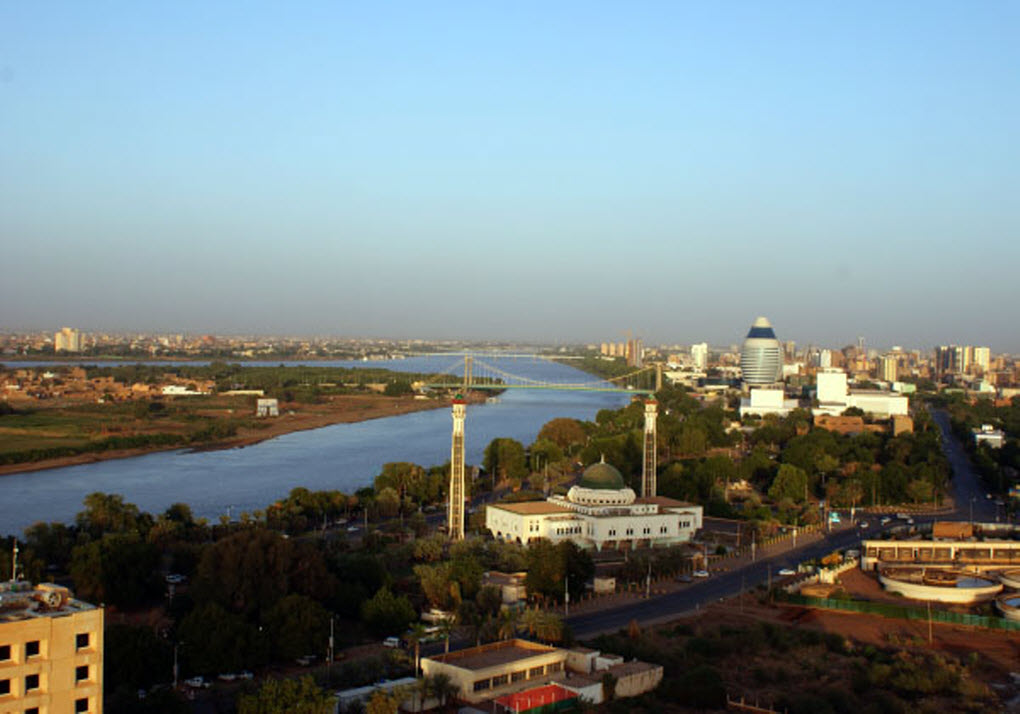
Khartoum, Arab Capital of Culture 2005 for Sudan.

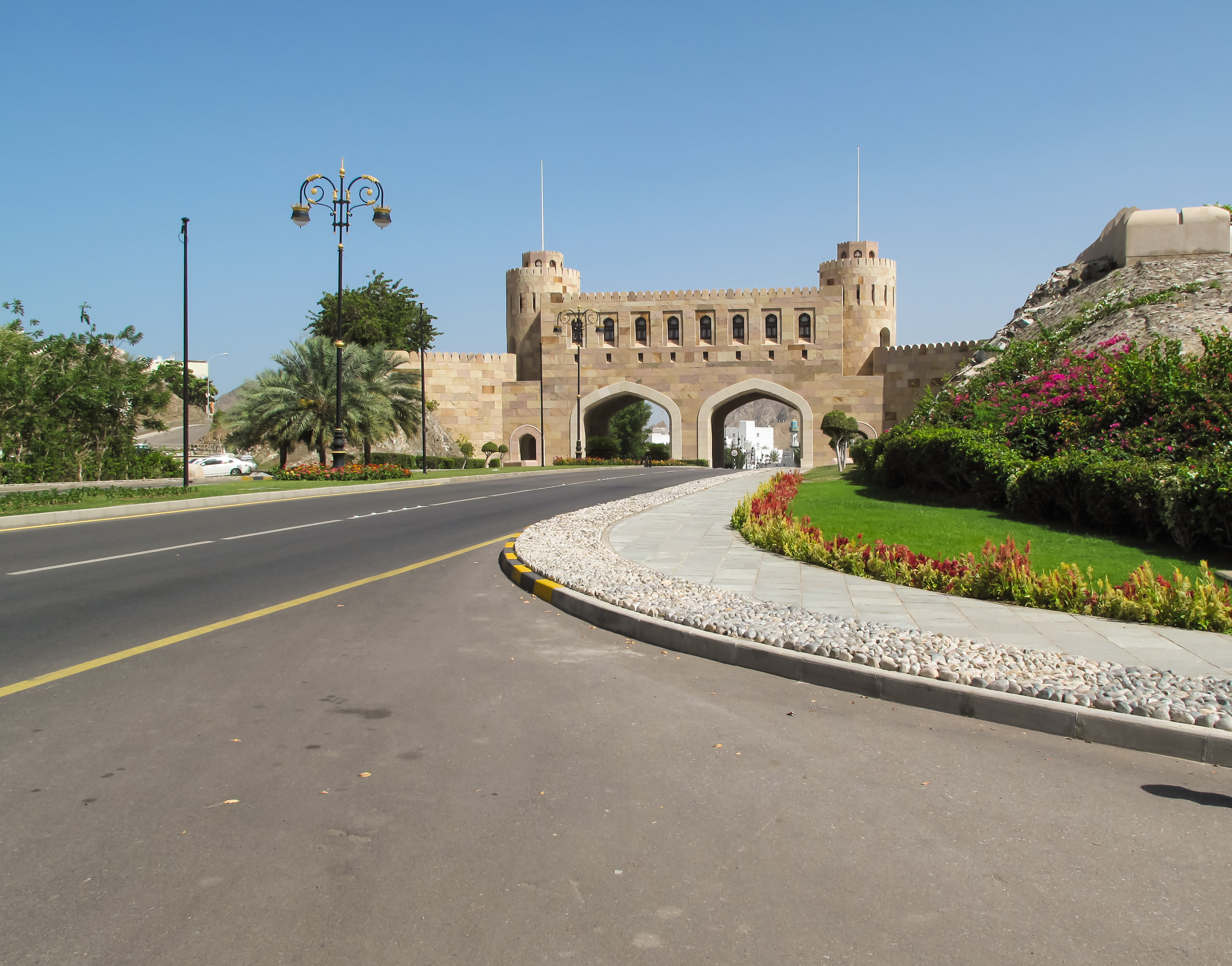
Muscat, Arab Capital of Culture 2006 for Oman.

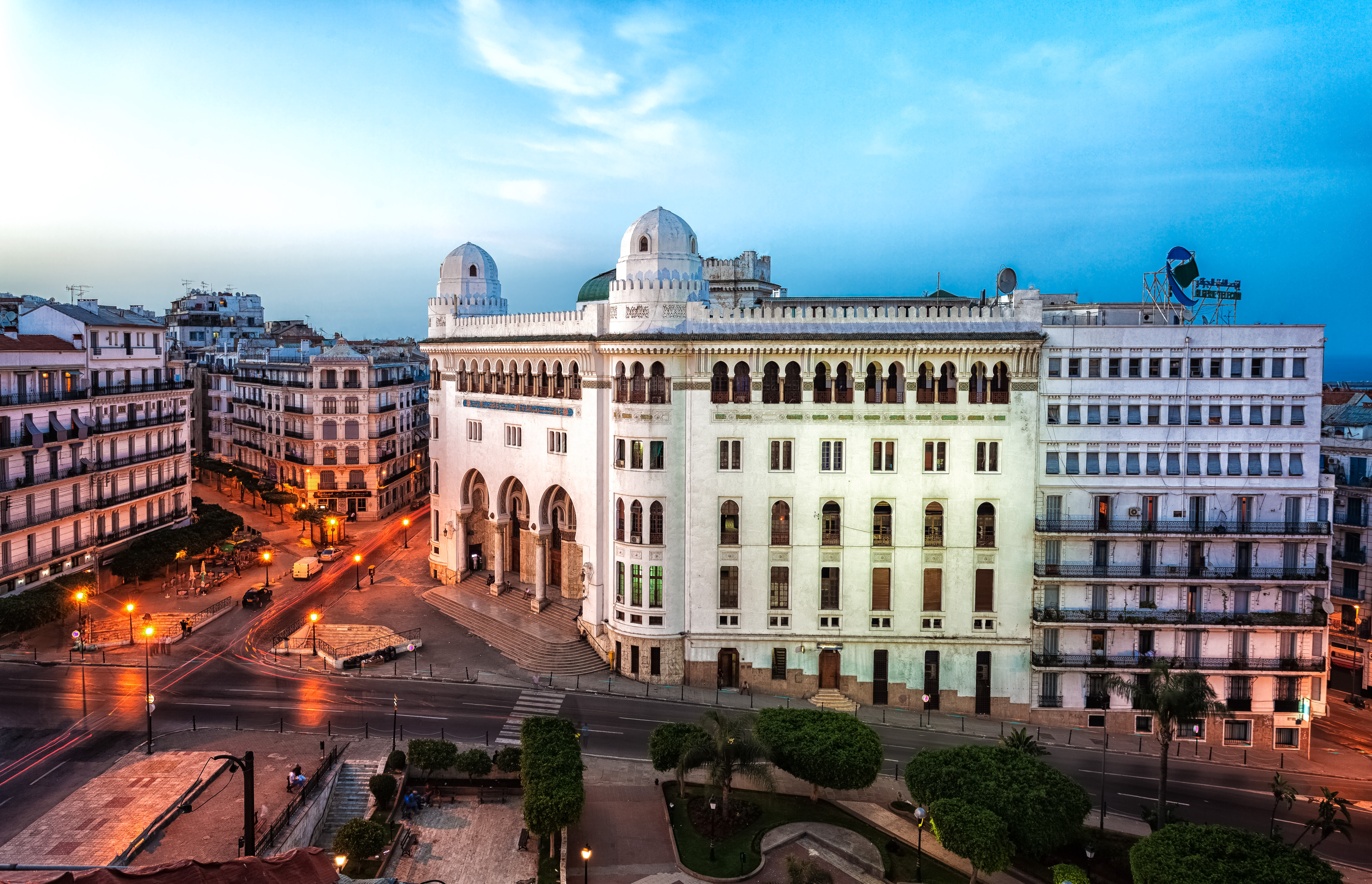
Algiers, Arab Capital of Culture 2007 for Algeria.

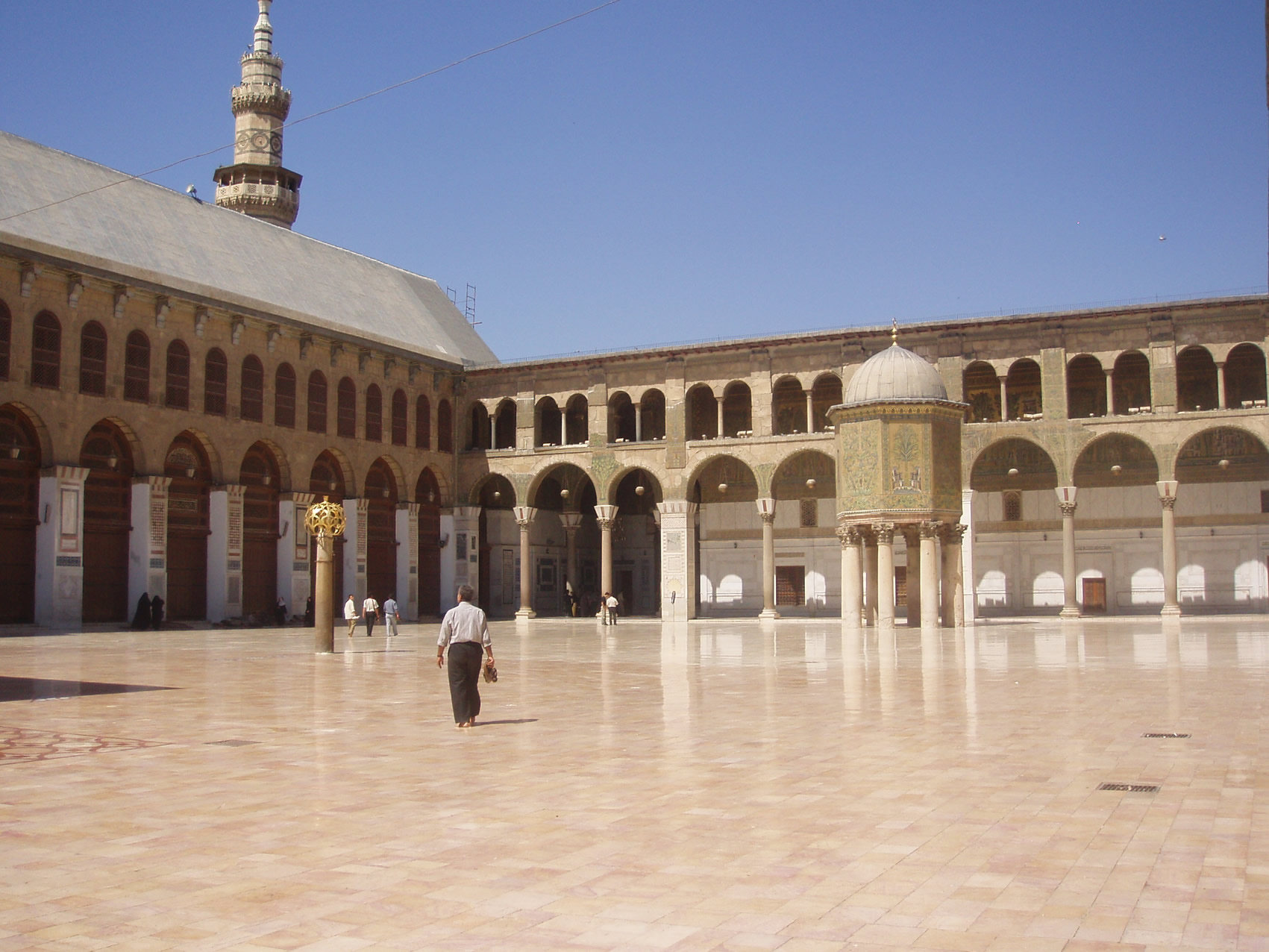
Damascus, Arab Capital of Culture 2008 for Syria.

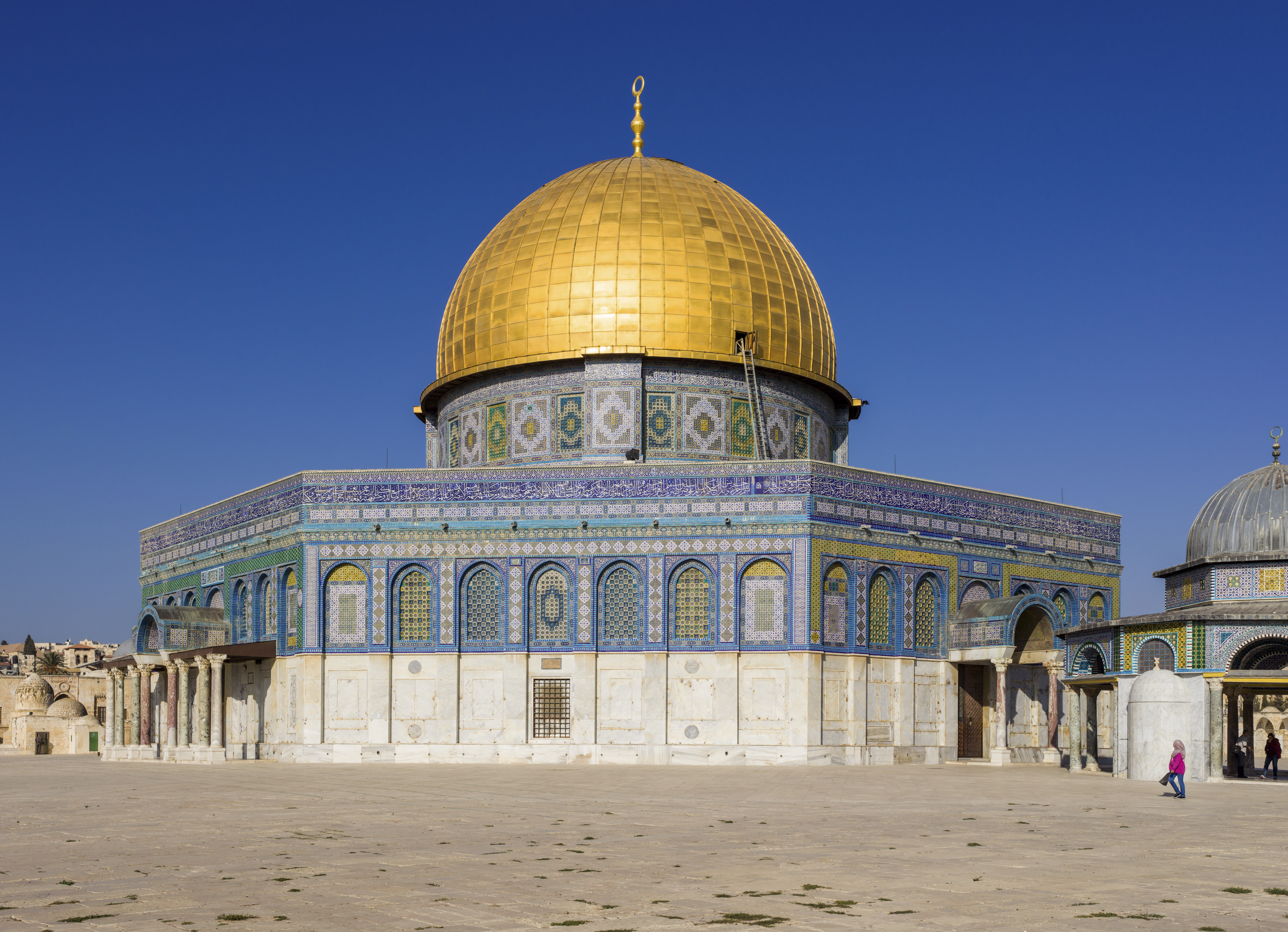
Jerusalem, Arab Capital of Culture 2009 for Palestine.

== See also ==
- American Capital of Culture – Latin American and Caribbean initiative
- European Capital of Culture – Cities recognized by the European Union as culturally significant for Europe

== Notes ==
i.	The award for Jerusalem was presented to "Palestine" East Jerusalem and its old city is considered the capital of Palestine by international law but it was captured in the Six-Day War in 1967 and was designated as a part of the Israeli-occupied territories, Israel has also enacted the Jerusalem Law that declares both West and East Jerusalem as its capital to that effect in a move denounced by the UN Security Council.
