= Ministry of Culture (Qatar) =

Government ministry of Qatar

Qatar Ministry of Culture
- وزارة الثقافة

Agency overview
- Formed: 2021
- Jurisdiction: Qatar
- Headquarters: Doha
- Agency executive: Abdulrahman bin Hamad bin Jassim bin Hamad Al Thani, Minister for Culture
- Website: moc.gov.qa

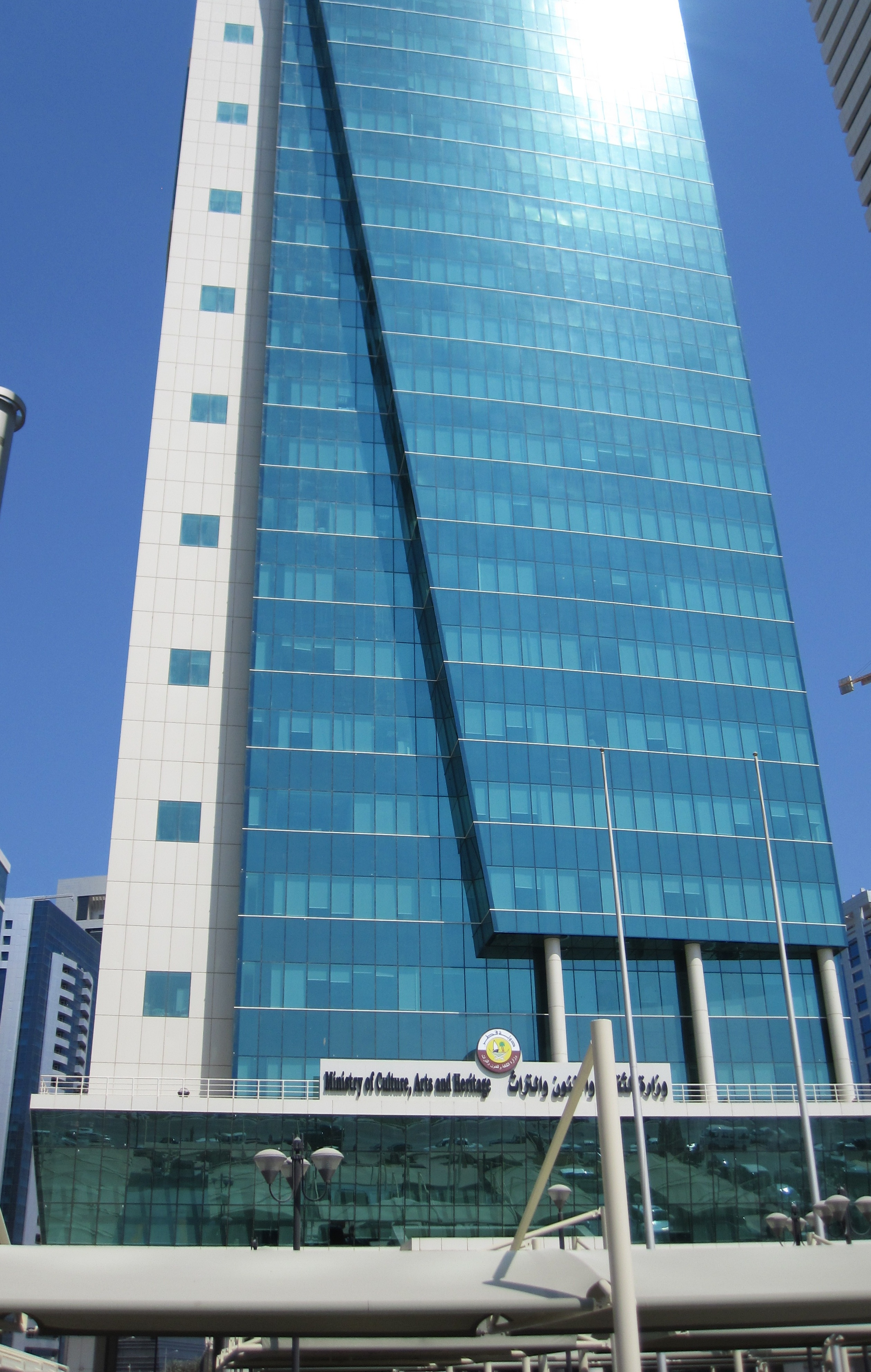
Ministry headquarters in 2011

The Ministry of Culture (Arabic: وزارة الثقافة, romanized: Wizārat al-Thaqāfah) is the ministry responsible for administering Qatar's cultural policies and programs. Its responsibilities include organizing cultural events, promoting cultural cooperation, publishing local literature and raising awareness of Qatar's culture. The current minister is Abdulrahman bin Hamad bin Jassim bin Hamad Al Thani, who was appointed in October 2021.

== History ==
Qatar's culture ministry has undergone several phases through its history until its official establishment in 2008. Prior to that year, the country's cultural policies were administered in tandem with other government ministries. In 1975, the first government department for culture was formed as part of the Ministry of Information. The ministry eventually integrated as the Ministry of Information and Culture in 1989. During Hamad Bin Abdulaziz Al-Kawari's tenure as Minister of Information and Culture from 1992 to 1996, he took steps to reduce media censorship.

Qatar's government decided to delegate its cultural administration to the Ministry of Education in 1996, resulting in its reformation as the Ministry of Education and Culture.

The first stand-alone government agency for culture was established in 1998 as the National Council for Culture, Arts and Heritage. Ten years later, the government replaced the National Council with the newly created Ministry of Culture, Arts and Heritage. In 2016, the Ministry of Culture, Arts and Heritage was merged with the Ministry of Youth and Sports (est. 2013) to form the Ministry of Culture and Sports. In 2021, an Emiri decree was issued separating the Ministry of Culture from the Ministry of Sports and Youth.

== Activities ==
The Ministry of Culture is heavily involved in coordinating 'Years of Culture' initiatives, which are organized primarily by the Qatar Museums Authority. The initiative entails cultural exchanges and the hosting of cultural exhibitions and events which showcase the culture of a select country for a duration of one year. Its inaugural edition was held in 2012 and featured Japan as Qatar's cultural exchange partner. In March 2013, during the Qatar–UK Year of Culture, the ministry held an Arts and Disability Festival in the Katara Cultural Village. It was the first major Arts and Disability Festival to take place in the Middle East.

=== Publications ===
Mohammed Hassan Al Kuwari, lead researcher at the Ministry's Department of Research and Studies, oversaw the publication of four books in 2014: Cultural Publications of the Ministry of Culture, Arts and Heritage from 1976 to 2013, The Directory of Qatari Authors, The Directory of Cultural Institutions, and The Directory of Photographers in Qatar.

== Organization ==
The ministry has several sections and departments for both cultural activities and publications or broadcasts. The Department of Press and Publications is involved in granting licenses, registering writers, and overseeing the censorship of publications. The Department of Communications oversees the conference of licenses while also presiding over the ministry's broadcasting stations. There is a Research Department which is in charge of the translation and research of publications. The Public Libraries Department has four separate sections and is mainly involved in making the ministry's latest publications accessible to the public.

Cultural activities are managed by the Department of Cultural Activities. The Department of Theatrical Activities handles the recording of the country's drama and theatre groups and is directly responsible for creating new theatre groups. Music and music groups are administered by the Department of Popular Arts and Music. There is also a Department of Visual Arts.

Other departments of the ministry include a Human Resources Department, and a Department of Financial and Administrative Affairs.

== See also ==
- Culture of Qatar
