= Dar Laadhar =

- دار العذار (Arabic)
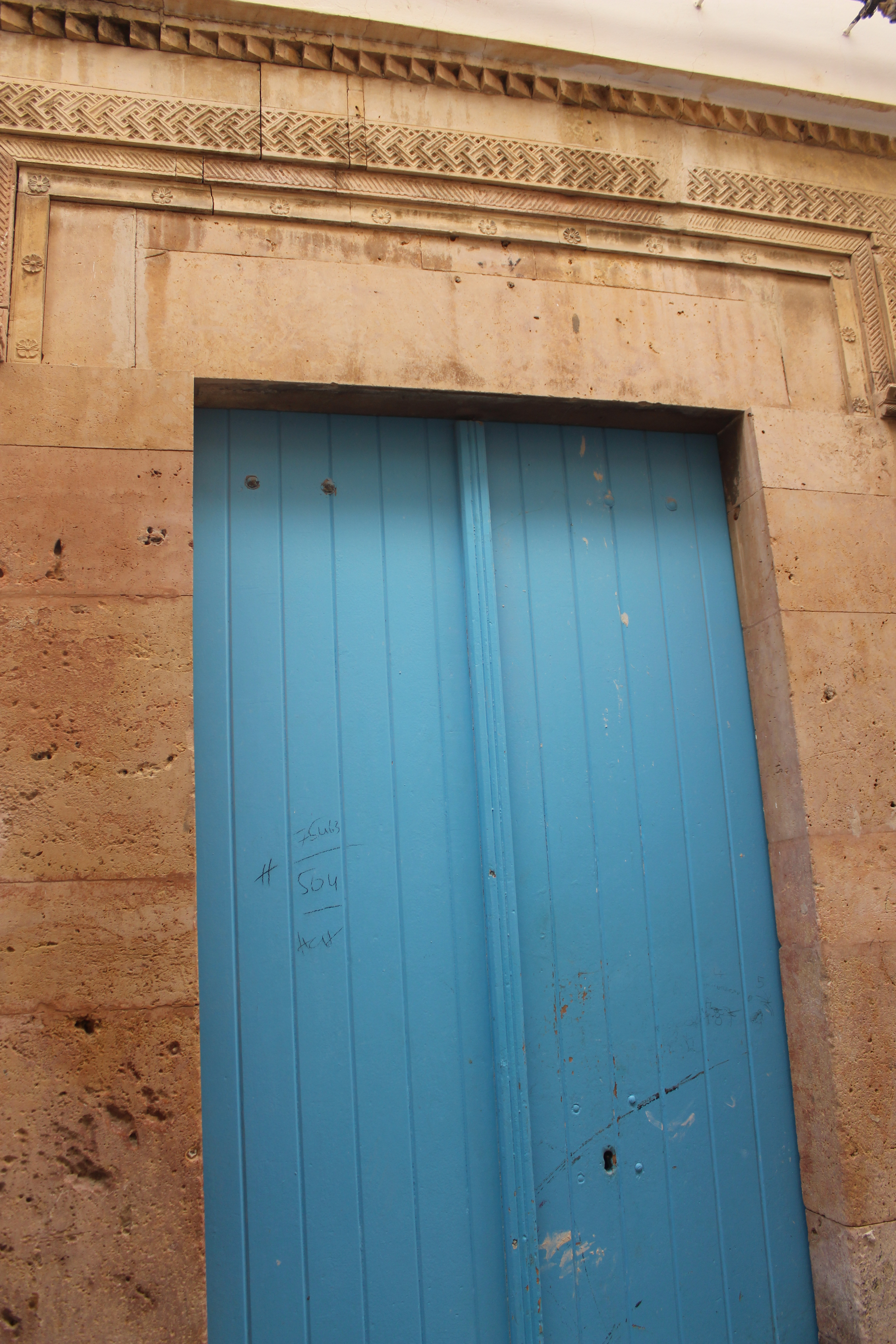
- Entrance of Dar Laadhar
- Location: Medina of Sfax, Tunisia

Dar Laadhar (Arabic: دار العذار) is a historic residence located in the north-western quarter of the Medina of Sfax, Tunisia. It is renowned as one of the oldest and most esteemed houses within the medina's architecture. The residence is situated on Cheikh Tijani Street, also known as Zuqaq El Dhhab or The Gold's Street, and is in proximity to Dar Kammoun.

== History ==
Originally owned by the affluent Laadhar family, notable figures in Sfax during the 19th century, the house has retained its historical significance. A restoration project in 2012 helped preserve its heritage.

== Notable residents ==
The residence has been associated with prominent individuals, including:

- Mohamed Laadhar, who served as a judge in Sfax under the rule of Sadok Bey.
- Mohamed ben Hadj Mohamed ben Said Laadhar, notable as the imam of Bouchouicha mosque. His distinction extended as he became a judge following an order by Ali Bey on August 5, 1900. Additionally, he was appointed by An-Nasir Bey as a Bach Mufti on March 10, 1919.

== See also ==
- Dar Laadhar, on BebJebli.tn
