= Embassy of Qatar, Washington, D.C. =

Embassy of the State of Qatar in Washington, D.C.
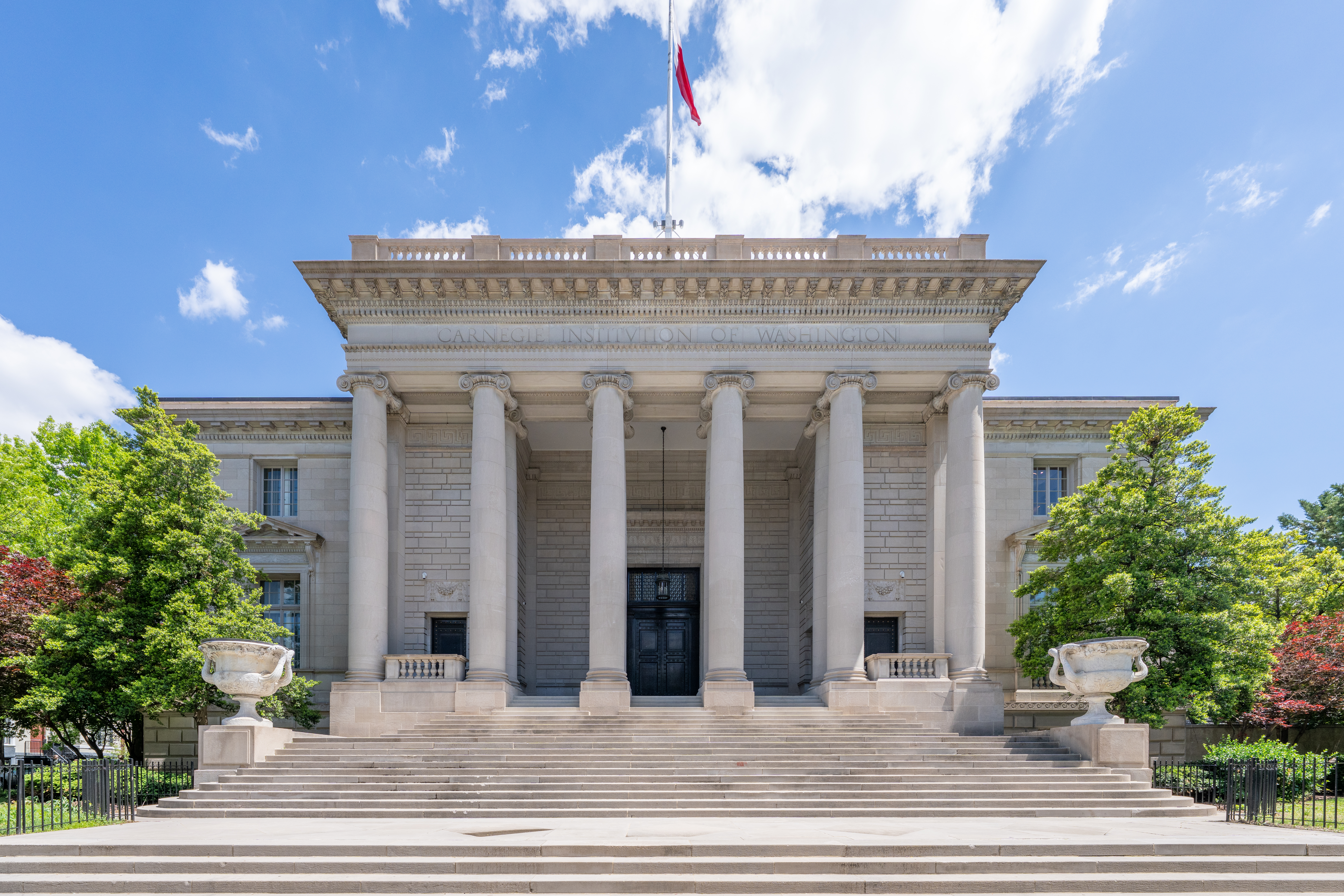
- Location: Washington, D.C.
- Address: 1530 P St NW, Washington, DC 20005
- Coordinates: 38.9094°N 77.03626°W
- Ambassador: Sheikh Meshal bin Hamad Al Thani
- Website: Embassy website

The Embassy of Qatar in Washington, D.C. houses Qatar's diplomatic mission to the United States. The chancery is located at the Administration Building of the Carnegie Institution of Washington at 1530 P Street NW.

== Background ==
Until 2005, the embassy was located in an office building at 4200 Wisconsin Avenue N.W. For many years the embassy consisted of only two diplomats and a small number of staffers. In recent years, Qatar has been working to make itself a banking, business, and tourism centre and this created a need for a larger embassy. So too did the growing strategic partnership between Qatar and the U.S. that has seen large numbers of American forces based in the country. In 2001, Qatar purchased the former building at 2555 M Street NW for $13.6 million from Castleton Holdings. The building had previously held law offices. On 25 October 2025, the embassy was inaugurated at its new location at 1530 P St NW, after purchasing the property from the Carnegie Institution for Science for an undisclosed sum in 2021.

The current ambassador is Sheikh Meshal bin Hamad Al Thani.

== Architecture and construction ==
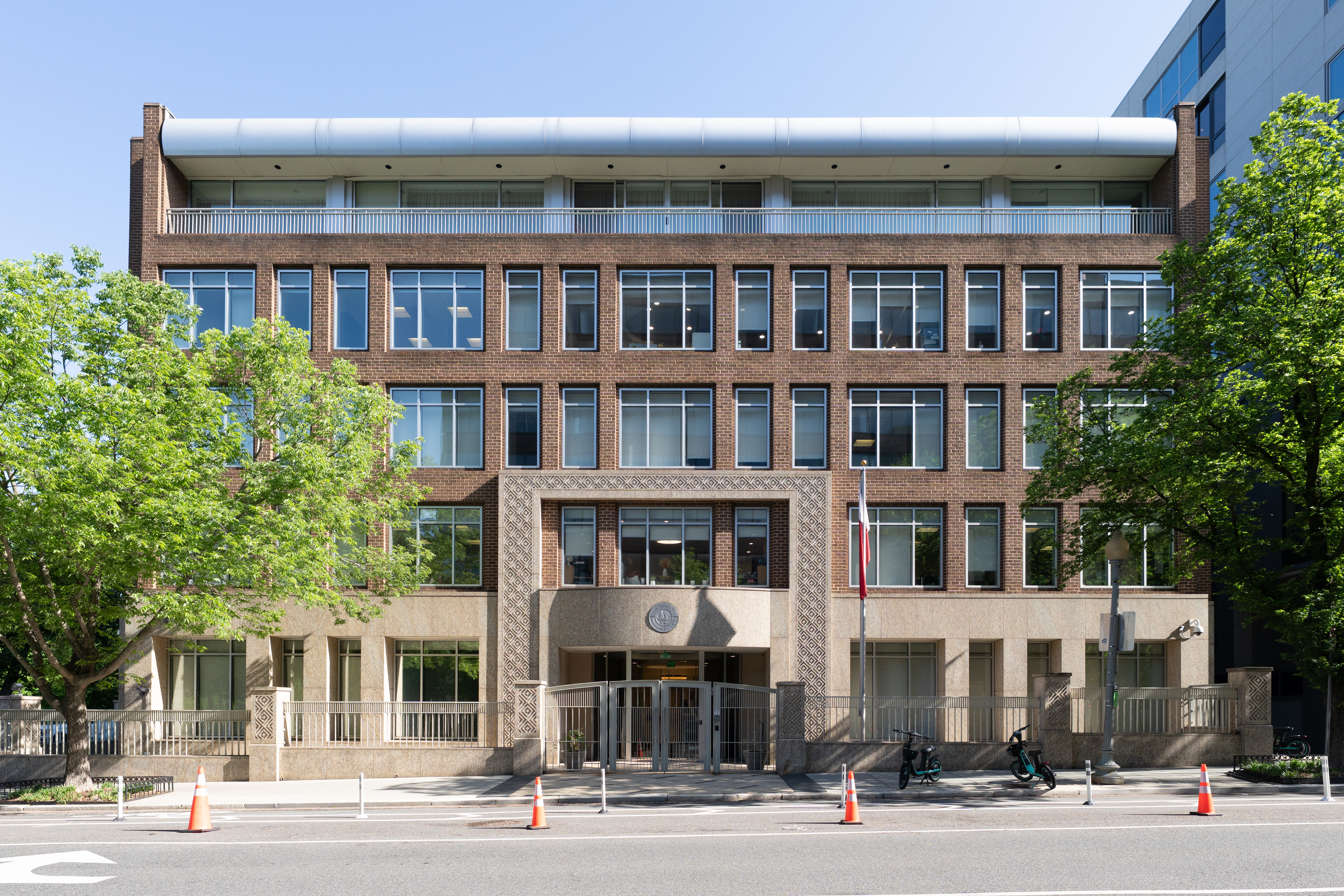
Former embassy building located at 2555 M Street, NW

=== M Street building (2005-2025) ===
For the M Street building the Qatari government retained The Georgetown Design Group with Mokhless Al-Hariri as the lead-architect to fully renovate the building. The first phase of work consisted of the due-diligence evaluation of the 80,000-square-foot (7,400 m^{2}) building. The second phase comprised the fast-track development of the project's programmatic requirements as well as the accelerated space planning and integrated architectural and engineering design services required by the complete gutting and full renovation of the building.

In keeping with applicable regulations, the project required statutory reviews and approval by several U.S. governmental agencies including the Office of Foreign Missions, United States Commission of Fine Arts, the District of Columbia Department of Consumer and Regulatory Affairs, and the Advisory Neighborhood Commission.

After all necessary permits were obtained by The Georgetown Design Group, the Qatar Islamic Bank, which was then financing the project, considered reducing the project's scope of work. The Qatar Ministry of Foreign Affairs opted to implement the project in accordance with Mokhless Al-Hariri's design. The Embassy moved to its new building in early 2005.

The architect Mokhless Al-Hariri said, "the renovated building's design is intended to reflect Qatar's dynamic growth and expending diplomatic and economic role".

Additional design input can also be credited to Maria Midani and Barbara Mullnex. The new exteriors incorporate Arabic design motifs that express Qatar's cultural heritage within Washington, D.C. The fully renovated interiors include office suites, conference rooms, special event spaces, and "highly customized finishes".

== See also ==
- The Corcoran School (Georgetown), houses the embassy's Defense Attaché Office
