= 2010 Arab Capital of Culture =

- Dates: 2010
- Location: (Qatar) Doha

Doha, Qatar was chosen as the 2010 Arab Capital of Culture, an initiative of UNESCO's Cultural Capitals Program to promote Arab culture and encourage cooperation in the Arab world. The Qatari government prepared for the festival in different ways, including building an $82 million cultural village.
