= Culture of Qatar =

The culture of Qatar is strongly influenced by traditional Bedouin culture, with less acute influence deriving from India, East Africa, and elsewhere in the Persian Gulf. The peninsula's arid climate compelled its population to place an emphasis on maritime activities within local culture. Arts and literature themes are often related to sea-based activities, particularly in Qatari folklore and music, with pearling trips serving as the main inspiration for music and traditional myths like May and Ghilân.

Although visual arts were historically unpopular due to Islam's stance on depictions of sentient beings, in the mid-20th century, this field has increased in popularity due to increased prosperity from oil exports. During this period, Qatari art flourished due to the efforts of artists such as Jassim Zaini and Yousef Ahmad, as well as support from quasi-governmental institutions such as the Qatari Fine Arts Society, the National Council for Culture, Arts, and Heritage, and in contemporary times, Qatar Museums. At the same time, Qatari literature saw the popularization of genres such as short stories and novels in the 1950s due to increasing educational opportunities. Qatari literature traces its origins to the 19th century, when the primary genre was Nabati poetry. Qatari women were particularly active in this field, breaking social norms, as women were historically less active in traditional forms of art.

The country's traditions and customs are primarily rooted in its history as an Arab-Islamic country. Nomadic pastoralism, principally of camels, and pearl fishing were once cornerstone livelihoods, with the Bedouin and Hadar (settled) communities each having distinct customs. The majlis, a communal gathering space used for storytelling and social interactions, is an important part of the culture. Cultural policies and affairs are regulated by the Ministry of Culture. The current minister is Abdulrahman bin Hamad bin Jassim bin Hamad Al Thani.

== Arts and literature ==
=== Visual arts ===
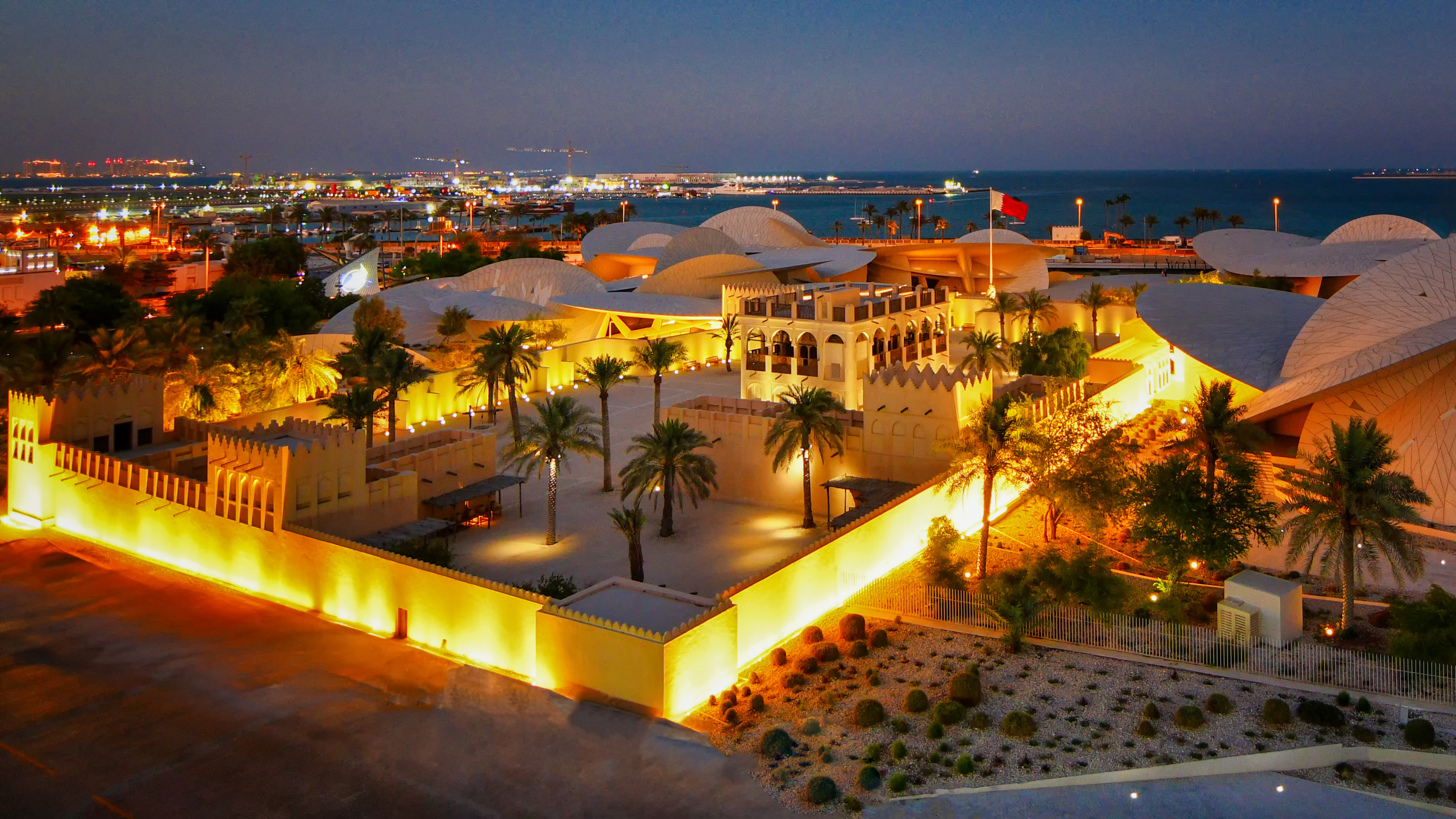
National Museum of Qatar

The modern Qatari art movement emerged in the mid-20th century, largely in part due to the increased prosperity from oil exports. Traditionally, Islamic culture's aversion to depicting sentient beings restricted the advancement of the visual arts, with Qataris instead favoring art forms such as calligraphy, architecture, and textiles. However, in the 1950s and 1960, the government, particularly the Ministry of Education increased funding and support to the visual arts, including artists such as Jassim Zaini, Yousef Ahmad, Salman Al Malik, Faraj Daham and Ali Hassan. Institutions like the Qatari Fine Arts Society, established in 1980, and the National Council for Culture, Arts, and Heritage, established in 1998, further reinforced the modern art scene.

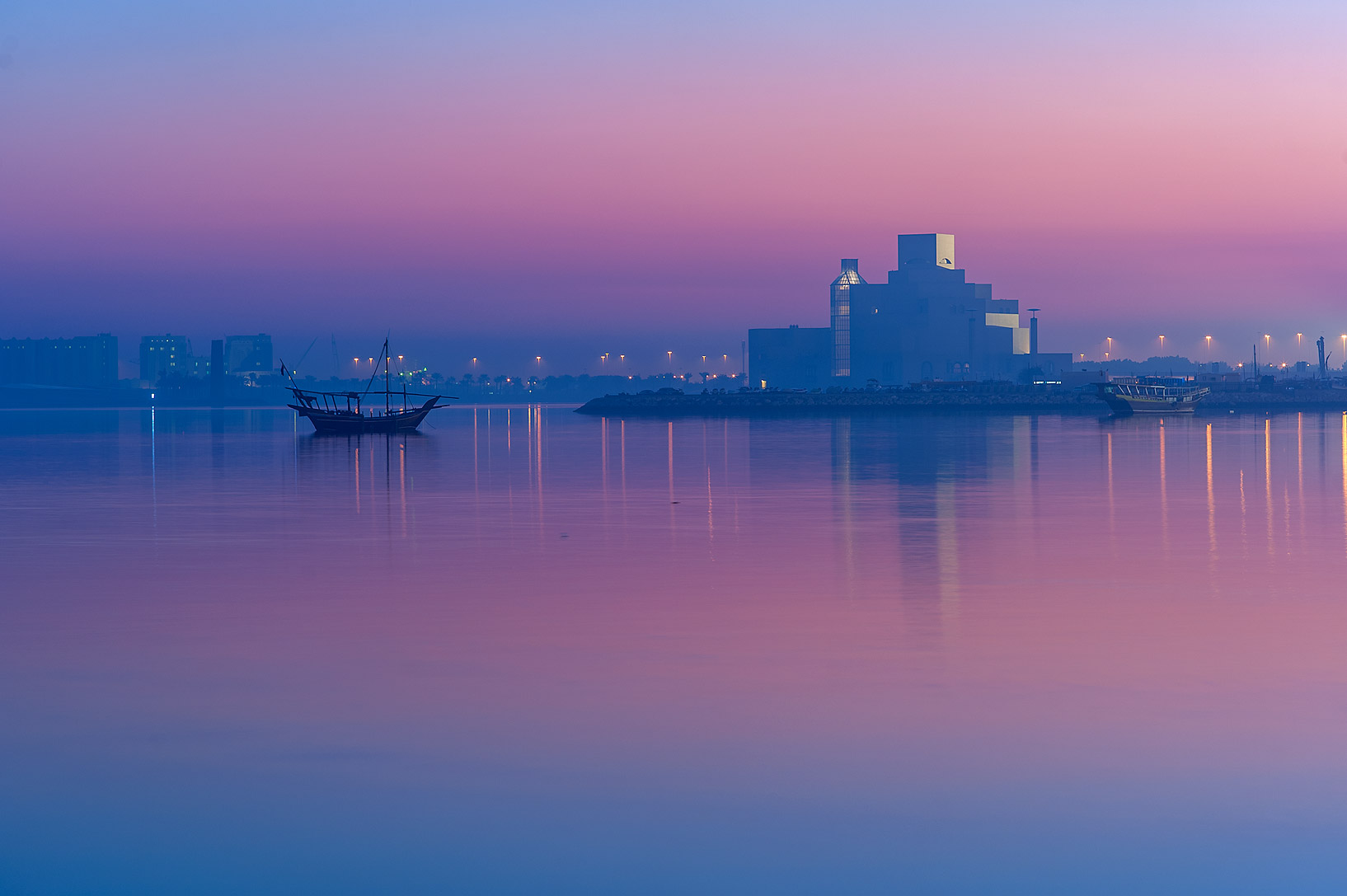
Museum of Islamic Art

Qatar Museums was established in the early 2000s to centralize various museums and collections. Following this was the inauguration of several more major art institutions like the Museum of Islamic Art in 2008, Mathaf: Arab Museum of Modern Art in 2010, and the National Museum of Qatar in 2019. Plans for additional museums were announced in 2022, including the Art Mill, Lusail Museum, and Qatar Auto Museum.

For the last twenty years, several members of the Al Thani family have advanced Qatar's global involvement in the arts. Qatar was revealed to be the world's biggest art buyer in 2011. Figures like Sheikha Al-Mayassa bint Hamad Al Thani, Sheikha Moza bint Nasser and Hassan bin Mohamed Al Thani have played significant roles in developing the country's art scene and its related institutions.

Contemporary cultural life in Qatar has expanded significantly with the development of major cultural institutions, including museums, galleries, and cultural festivals. These initiatives reflect the country's investment in positioning itself as a global cultural hub while also promoting local artistic production.

=== Architecture ===
The architecture of Qatar is similar to other Persian Gulf nations, and influenced by Islamic traditions. Features such as arches, niches, and intricately carved plaster patterns, as well as gypsum screens and battlements, are common. The hot desert climate heavily influenced the choice of materials, with rough stones from hills or coastal areas, bound together by clay, serving as primary building materials. Over time, clay was replaced with gypsum mortar, and wood, particularly for beams, was incorporated. Limestone, sourced from nearby rocky hills, was occasionally used in construction.

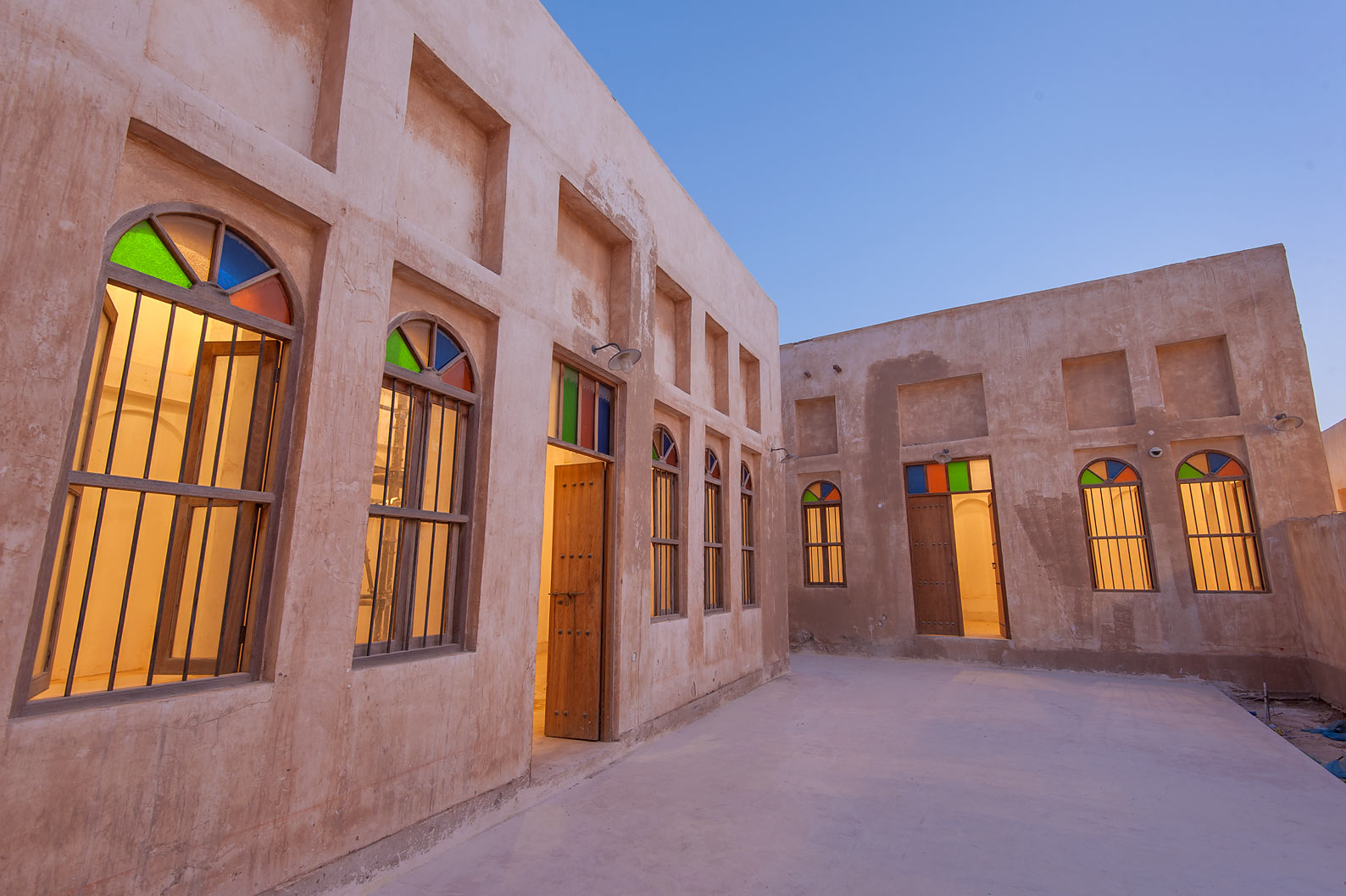
Traditional Qatari houses in Al Wakrah Heritage Village

Qatari architecture is categorized into religious, civil, and military types. Religious architecture, mainly mosques, are typically unadorned, yet on rare occasions in urban areas, may feature intricate designs. Civil architecture includes palaces, houses, and marketplaces. Military architecture consists of fortresses and defensive walls designed for protection, sometimes enclosing settlements. Coastal architecture shows Persian influences, while inland styles reflect Najdi traditions.

Traditional Qatari houses are centered around courtyards, which provide ventilation, sunlight, and private space for domestic activities. The houses are designed with the preservation of privacy in mind, and the layout of the houses segregates male visitors from family areas. The majlis, a formal reception area, holds particular importance in social contexts.

Several methods were used in traditional architecture to alleviate the country's harsh climate; for instance, windows were seldom used to reduce heat conduction. The badgheer construction method allowed air to be channeled into houses for ventilation. Air was also channeled by horizontal air gaps in rooms, and parapets and vertical openings in wind towers called hawaya which drew air into the courtyards. Such towers were historically present in coastal settlements such as Al Wakrah.

=== Folklore ===
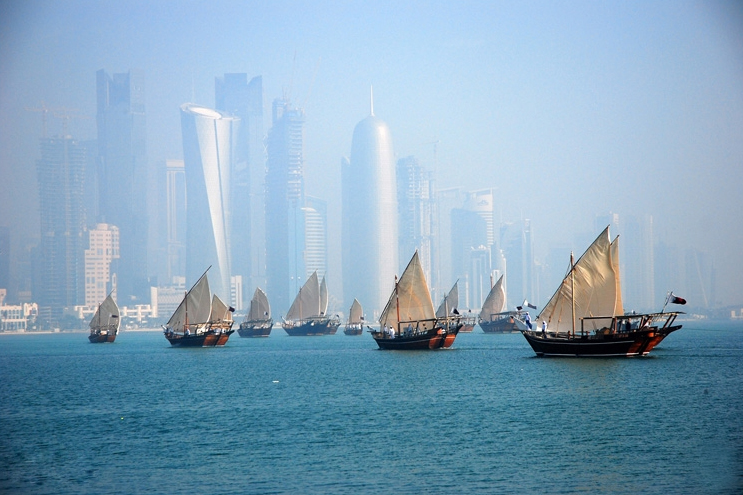
Dhows historically used for pearling at a Qatari dhow festival

Qatari folklore, known locally as hazzawi, was historically passed down orally between generations and is based mainly on maritime activities. One popular legend, or hikaya, is that of May and Ghilân. Originating from the Al Muhannadi tribe of Al Khor, the story narrates a struggle between two pearl fishers which results in the creation of the sail. Another locally popular tale is the Lord of the Sea, which revolves around a half-man half-fish monster named Bū Daryā who terrorizes sailors.

Among the notable folk heroes in Qatari folklore are individuals like Qatari ibn al-Fuja'a, a celebrated war poet from the 7th century, and Rahmah ibn Jabir Al Jalhami, an infamous pirate and ruler of Qatar in the 18th and 19th centuries. Recurring motifs in Qatari folklore include djinn, pearl diving, and the sea.

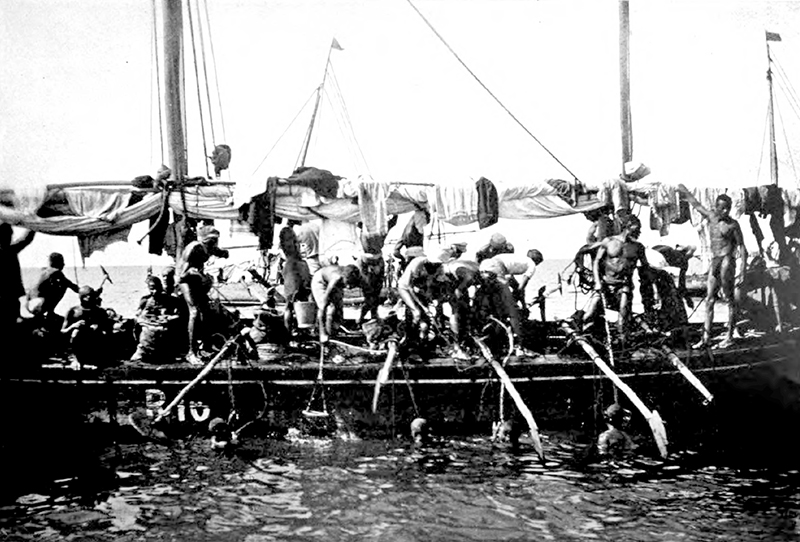
Pearl diving in the Persian Gulf

With the advent of oil exploration and modernization, the tradition of oral storytelling gradually declined. Efforts by government ministries such as the Ministry of Culture, alongside local universities, have been made to preserve and transcribe these tales. Collaborative endeavors between government agencies and regional bodies like the GCC States Folklore Centre, headquartered in Doha, have helped preserve the local folklore.

=== Literature ===
Qatari literature as a field began in the 19th century, initially featuring written poetry, mainly the nabati form. In the mid-20th century, spurred by oil revenues, short stories and novels emerged as popular literary forms. Poetry remained popular, but other literary genres became increasingly common as a result of a more educated population, and increasingly featured women writers.

Qatari literature is broadly categorized into two periods, divided primarily by increasing economic prosperity and globalization: pre-1950 and post-1950.

In the 1970s, the popularization of short stories and novels provided both the opportunity for female writers to involve themselves in the arts, as well as an avenue to discuss societal problems. Kaltham Jaber became the first Qatari female author to publish a collection of short stories, and to publish a major work when she released her anthology of short stories, dating from 1973 to the year of its publishing, 1978. Novels have become more popular in the 21st century; nearly a quarter of all existing Qatari-authored novels were published post-2014. Efforts to preserve and document Qatari literature have been undertaken through initiatives like the Qatar Digital Library and local publishing houses.

=== Poetry ===
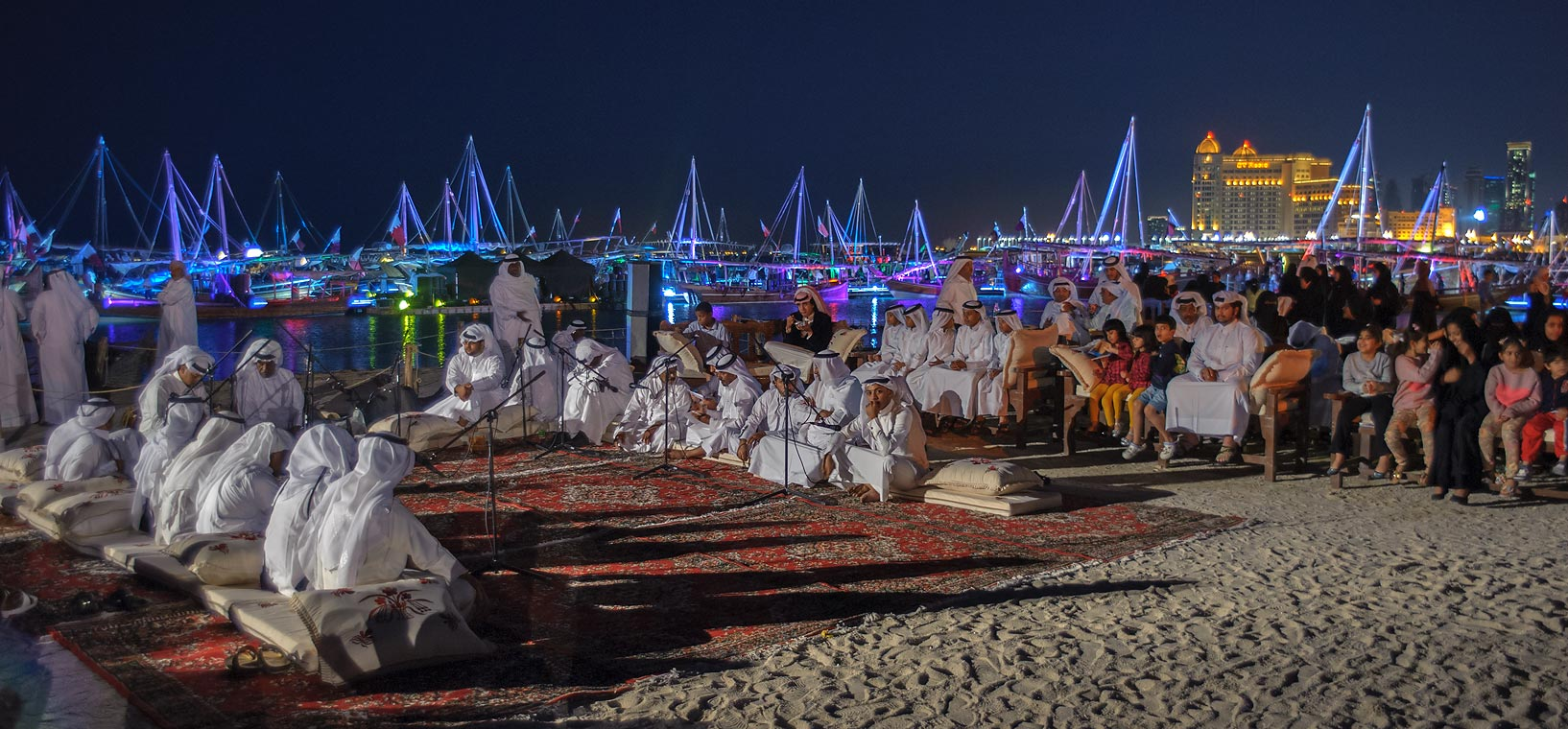
Traditional dhow festival held at Katara Cultural Village

Poetry has been an integral part of the culture since pre-Islamic times. Qatari ibn al-Fuja'a, a folk hero dating to the seventh century, was renowned for writing poetry. It was seen as a verbal art which fulfilled essential social functions. Having a renowned poet among its ranks was a source of pride for tribes; it was the primary way age-old traditions were passed down through generations. Poems composed by females primarily focused on the theme of ritha, to lament. This type of poetry served as an elegy.

Nabati was the primary form of oral poetry. In the nineteenth-century, Sheikh Jassim Al Thani composed influential Nabati poems on the political conditions in Qatar. Nabati poems are broadcast on radio and televised in the country.

=== Weaving and dyeing ===
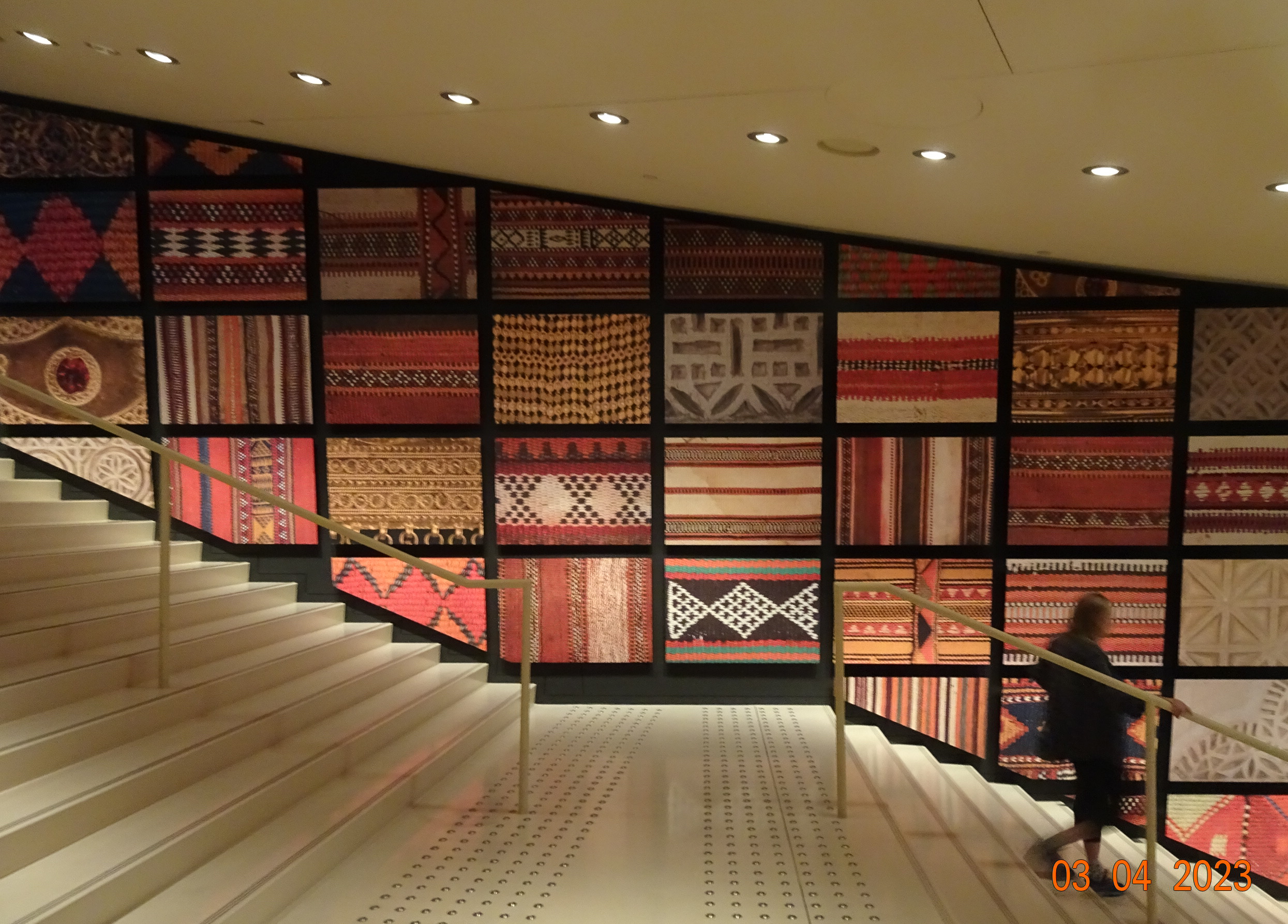
Tapestry patterns on display at the National Museum of Qatar

Weaving and dyeing by women played a substantial role in Bedouin culture. Spinning sheep's and camel's wool to produce cloths was laborious. The wool was first disentangled and tied to a bobbin, serving as a core and keeping the fibers rigid. This was followed by spinning the wool by hand on a spindle known as noul. They were then placed on a vertical loom constructed from wood whereupon women would use a stick to beat the weft into place.

The resulting cloths were used in rugs, carpets, and tents. Tents were usually made up of naturally colored cloths, whereas rugs and carpets used dyed cloths; mainly red and yellow. The dyes were fashioned from desert herbs, with simple geometrical designs being employed. The art lost popularity in the 19th century as dyes and cloths were increasingly imported from other regions in Asia.

=== Embroidery ===
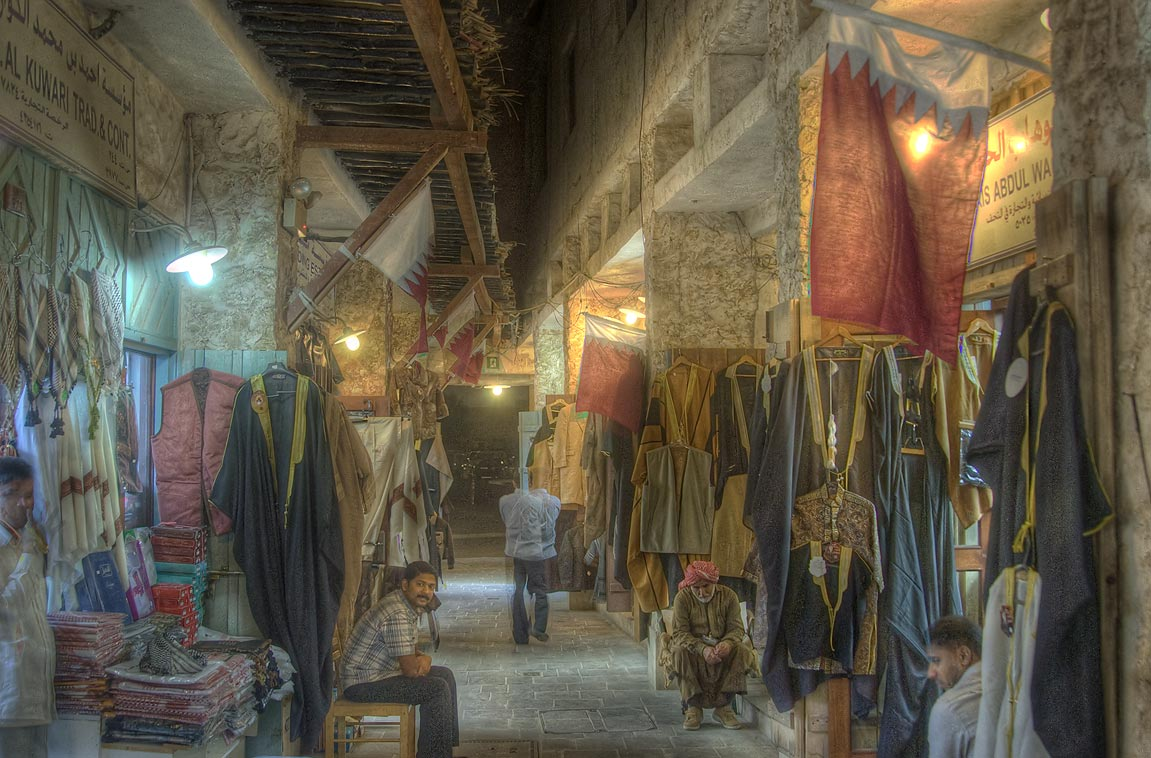
Embroidered dresses on display in Souq Waqif

A simple form of embroidery practiced by Qatari women was known as kurar. It involved four women, each carrying four threads, who would braid the threads on articles of clothing - mainly thawbs or abayas. The braids, varying in color, were sewn vertically. It was similar to heavy chain stitch embroidery. Gold threads, known as zari, were commonly used. They were usually imported from India.

Another type of embroidery involved the designing of caps called gohfiahs. They were made from cotton and were pierced with thorns from palm trees to allow the women to sew between the holes. This form of embroidery declined in popularity after the country began importing the caps.

Khiyat al madrasa, translated as 'school embroidery', involved stitching furnishings by satin stitching. Prior to the stitching process, a skilled artist would draw a shape onto the fabric. The most common designs were birds and flowers.

=== Music ===
The folk music of Qatar is largely influenced by pearl fishing. Traditional dances, such as the ardah and tanbura, are performed during festive occasions such as weddings or feasts and are accompanied by percussion instruments like al-ras and mirwas. Other commonly used folk instruments include stringed instruments such as the oud and rebaba, and woodwind instruments like the ney and sirttai. Clapping also played a major part in most folk music.

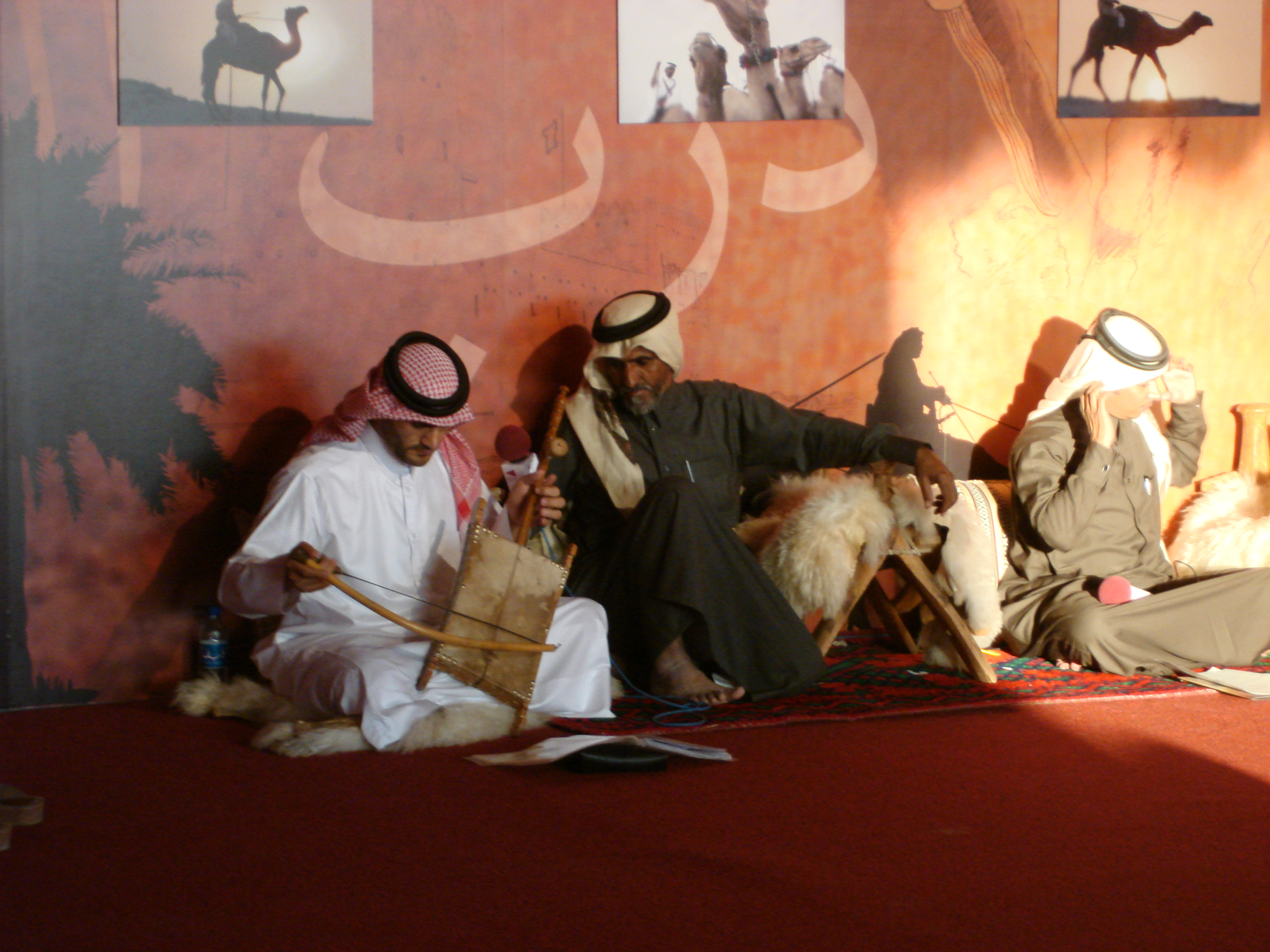
Qatari playing the rebaba in a tent

Various forms of folk music are repurposed in modern Khaliji (Gulf) music. The Ministry of Culture has made efforts to preserve and document folk music, alongside efforts to form an active music scene with the establishment of music institutions like the Qatar Music Academy and the Qatar Philharmonic Orchestra.

Songs related to pearl fishing are the most popular genre of male folk music. Each song, varying in rhythm, narrates a different activity of the pearling trip, including spreading the sails, diving, and rowing the ships. Collective singing was an integral part of each pearling trip. Each ship had a designated singer, known locally as al naham. A specific type of sea music, known as fijiri, features group performances accompanied by melodic singing, rhythmic palm-tapping on water jars (known as galahs), and wave-like dance. Qatari women sang primarily about daily activities, such as wheat grinding and cooking, in groups. Public performances by women were practiced only on two annual occasions: al-moradah and al-ashori. Classical Qatari melodies share many similarities with their Gulf counterparts, and most of the same instruments are used.

=== Theatre ===
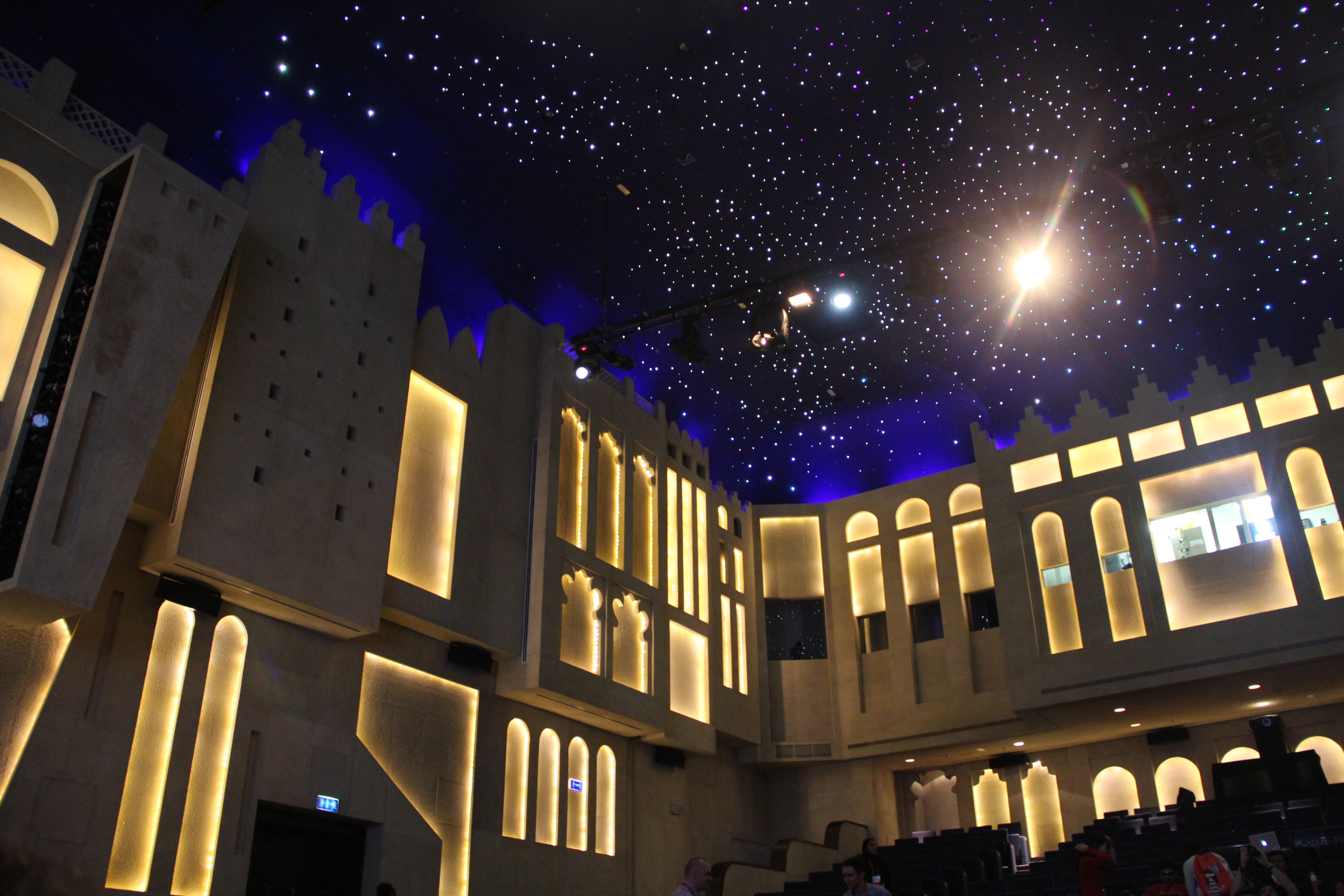
Katara Drama Theatre in Katara Cultural Village

Theatre emerged in Qatar during the mid-20th century, with the establishment of the troupes of the Qatari Theatrical Troupe in 1972 and the Al Sadd Theatrical Troupe in 1973. The Doha Players, founded in 1954, stands as the oldest English-speaking amateur theatre club in Qatar. By 1986, efforts to support theatrical endeavors culminated in the formation of the first company aimed at aiding troupes and actors in producing plays. Venues include the Qatar National Theater, Katara Drama Theatre, and Al Rayyan Theatre.

While specific theatrical themes, such as polygamy, marriage, family issues, and political discord have been subject to societal taboos, they have also served as popular subjects for theatre. Plays like Ommul Zain (1975) by Abdulrahman Al-Mannai addressed generational conflicts arising from Qatar's rapid development, while others like Ibtisam in the Dock (1985) and Girls Market offer perspectives on arranged marriages and societal norms. Furthermore, geopolitical events, such as the blockade imposed on Qatar in 2017, spurred an increase in politically-themed plays.

=== Mass media ===
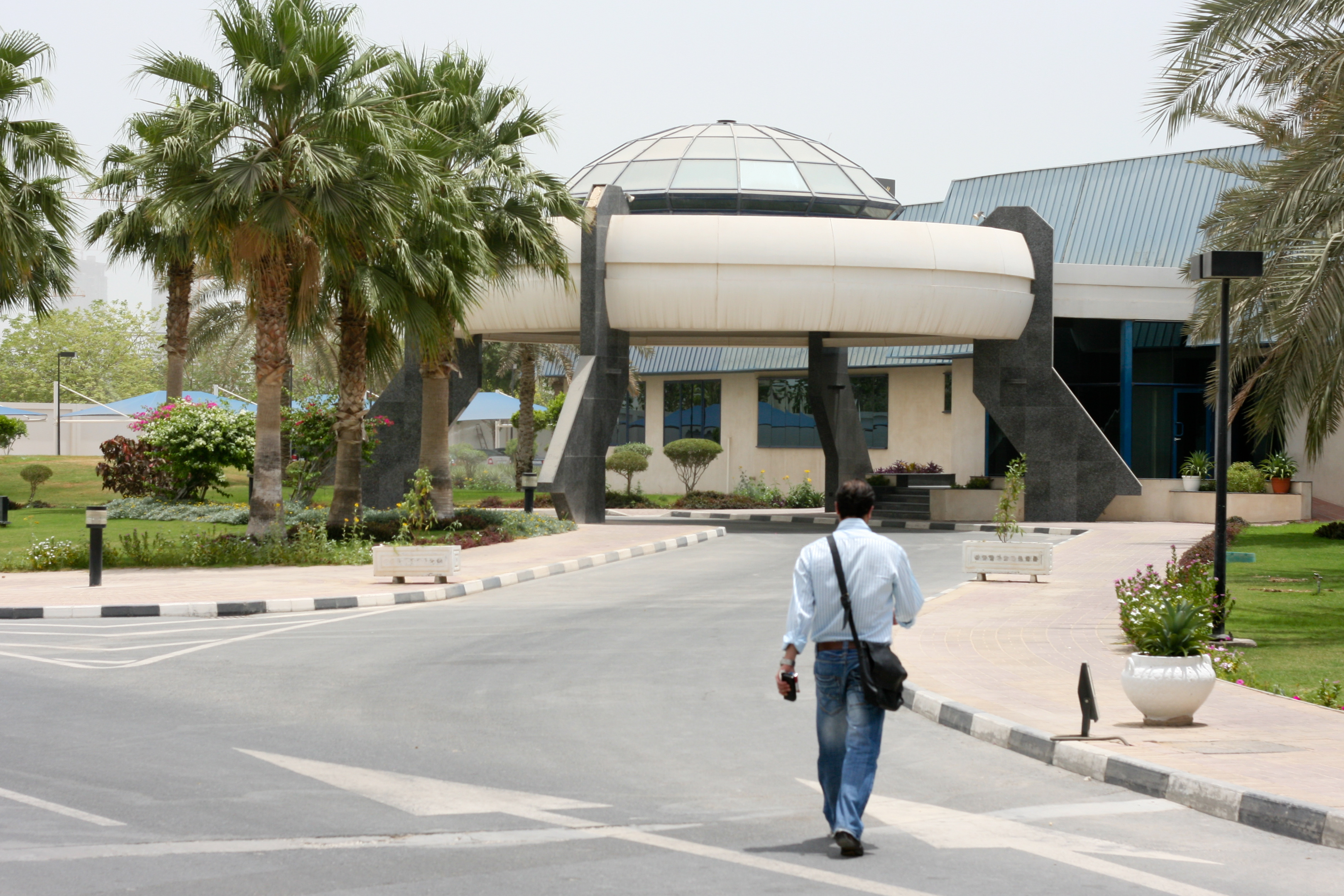
Al Jazeera Arabic Building

Al Jazeera, Qatar's largest television network, was founded in 1996 and has since become the foundation of the media sector. Initially launched as an Arabic news and current affairs satellite TV channel, Al Jazeera has since expanded into a network with several outlets, including the internet and specialty TV channels in multiple languages. The 'Al Jazeera effect' refers to the global impact of the Al Jazeera Media Network, particularly on the politics of the Arab world. beIN Sports, a global network of sports channels, was launched in 2012. It is an affiliate of Al Jazeera Media Network.

Qatar is home to seven newspapers, four in Arabic and three in English, along with nine magazines. Radio broadcasting began in June 1968, and currently offers services in English, Arabic, French, and Urdu through Qatar Radio. In a bid to enhance diversity, in 2020 the government granted licenses for private radio stations geared towards specific communities such as Malayalam and Hindi speakers.

Cinema in Qatar has developed rapidly in the 21st century, partially being developed as a means for Qatar to increase its soft power through the arts. Al-Mayassa bint Hamad Al Thani's founding of the Doha Film Institute (DFI) has provided support to local and regional filmmakers through grants, workshops, and festivals; for example, the Doha Tribeca Film Festival (DTFF) and Ajyal Film Festival.

== Traditions ==
=== Pearling and fishing ===
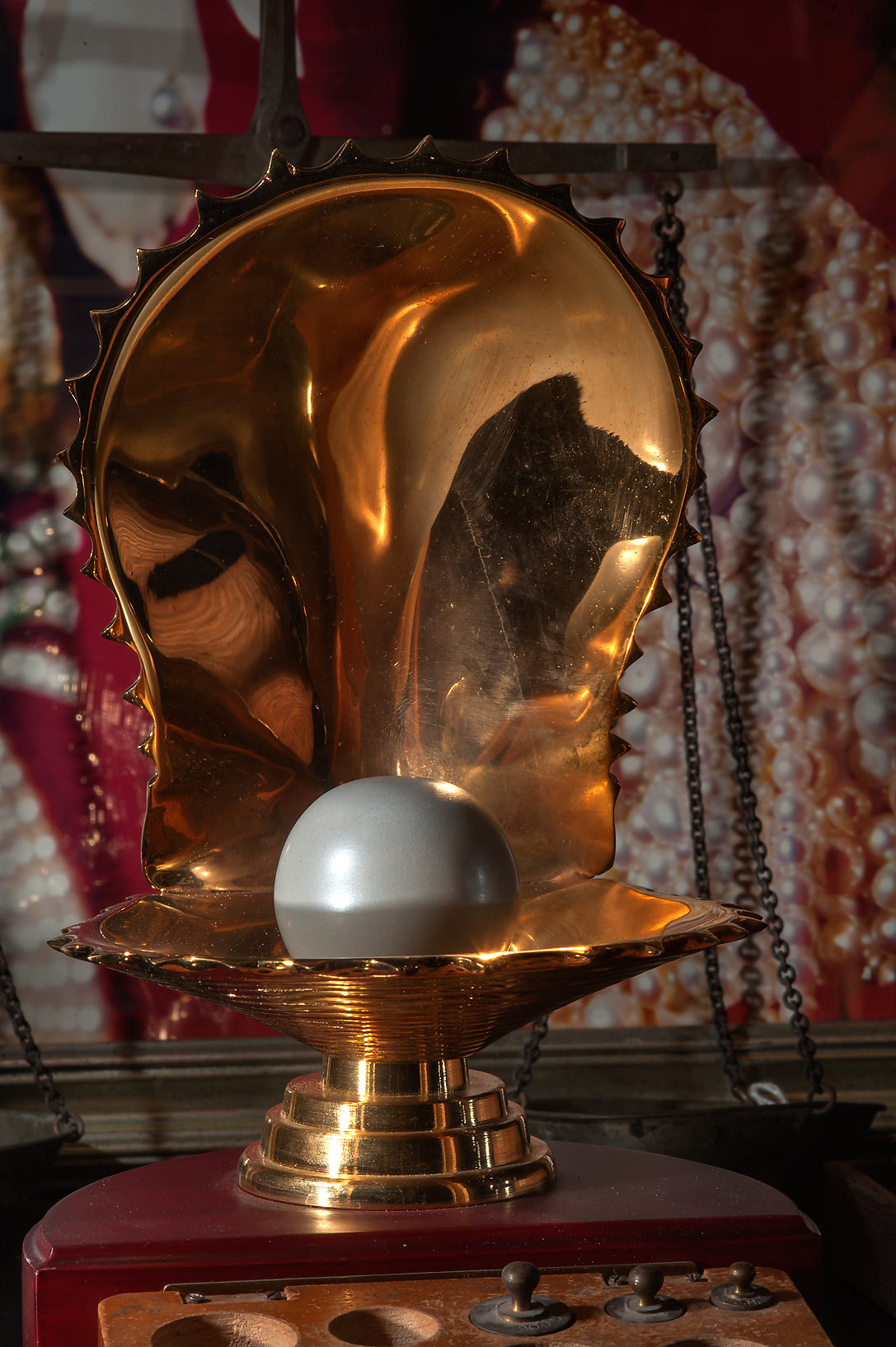
A pearl in a bronze oyster at Sheikh Faisal bin Qassim Al Thani Museum

As Qatar is a highly arid country, the traditional ways of life were confined either to nomadic pastoralism practiced by the Bedouins of the interior and to fishing and pearling engaged in by the settled coastal dwellers, called hadar, who formed the majority of the population. Both fishing and pearling were done mainly using dhows, and the latter activity occasionally employed enslaved people. While pearl trading was a lucrative venture for traders and dealers of pearls, the pearlers would receive scant profits. The central fishing and pearling centers of Qatar throughout its history have been Fuwayrit, Al Huwaila, and Al Bidda.

Pearling is an ancient practice in the Persian Gulf; with some historians stating the profession dates back to the Dilmun civilization in Bahrain 5,000 years ago, with which the inhabitants of Qatar came into contact at the time. The captain of a pearling craft is called nakhuda and is responsible for the most important tasks of a pearling trip, such as managing conflicts between the divers (al-fawwas) and the storage of pearls. The al-muqaddim is responsible for all ship operations while the al-sakuni is the ship's driver.

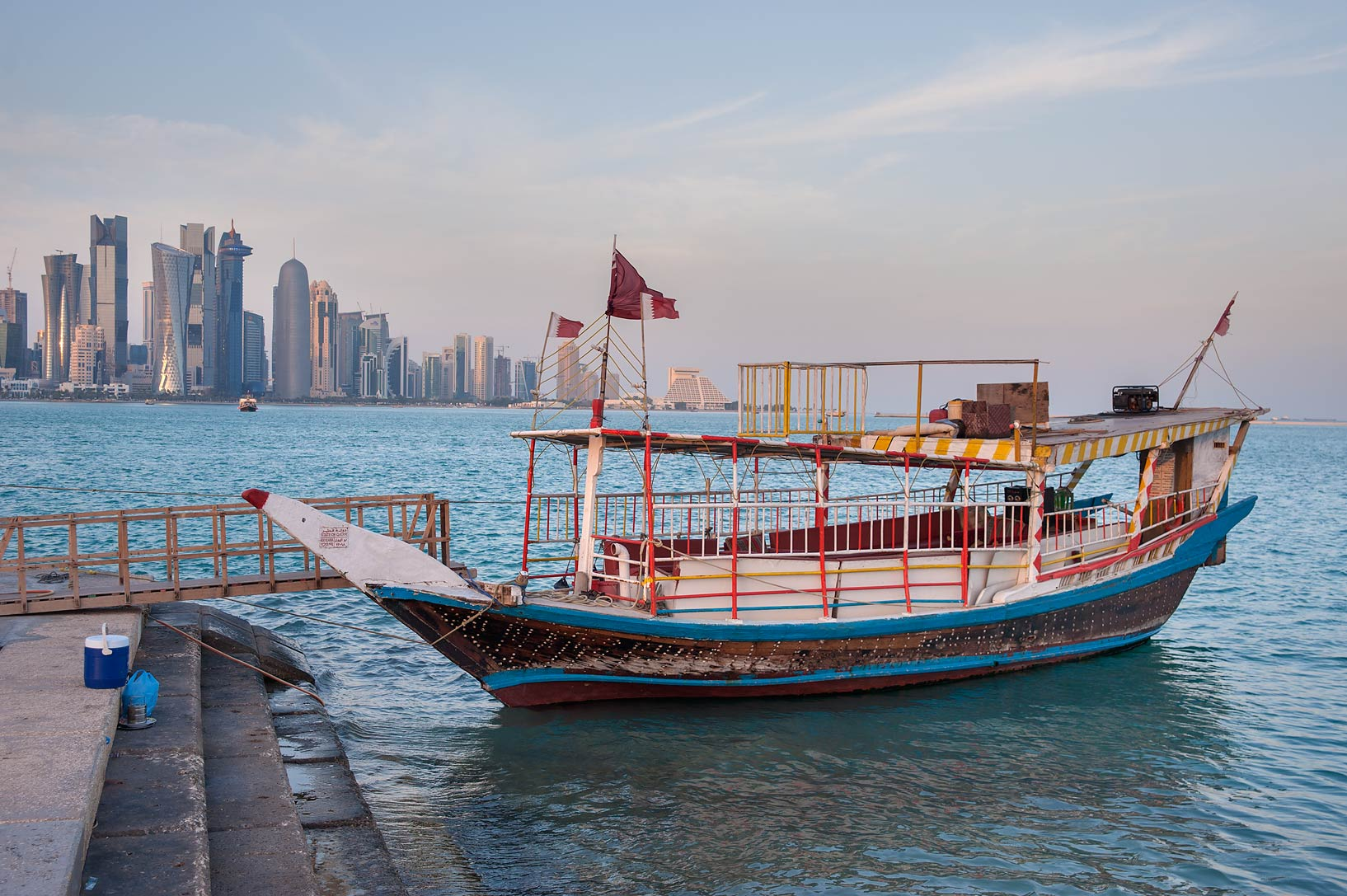
Traditional dhow at the Doha Corniche

Historically, the season for pearl harvest was divided into three periods, with the primary pearl diving season, lasting from May to September. Sambuk, a type of dhow, was traditionally used for pearling trips. From the 18th to 20th centuries, most pearls were exported to Mumbai, where they would be sent to European markets, with the remaining yield being sent to markets in Baghdad. The importance of the pearl in Qatar is exemplified by a quote of Mohammed bin Thani, ruler of Qatar in the late 1800s, who in 1877 said "We are all from the highest to the lowest slaves of one master, Pearl." After the introduction of the cultured pearl and the Great Depression in the 20th century, pearling became a less economically viable profession.

=== Nomadic pastoralism ===
Despite only comprising about one-tenths of the Qatari population, Bedouin Qataris occupy a significant historical role in local culture. Bedouin lifestyle was nomadic and consisted of frequent migration after either a water source had been used up or a grazing site was exhausted. However, in Qatar, most Bedouins would only wander during the winter when the weather was suitable. Goats and camels were the main livelihoods of Bedouins, with products from the former being used in trade and for sustenance and camels being used as a means of transportation and a source of milk. Every tribe had its own region, called dirah in Arabic, but if the resources in their dirah had become depleted, the tribe would be forced to migrate to another tribe's dirah, potentially provoking conflicts.

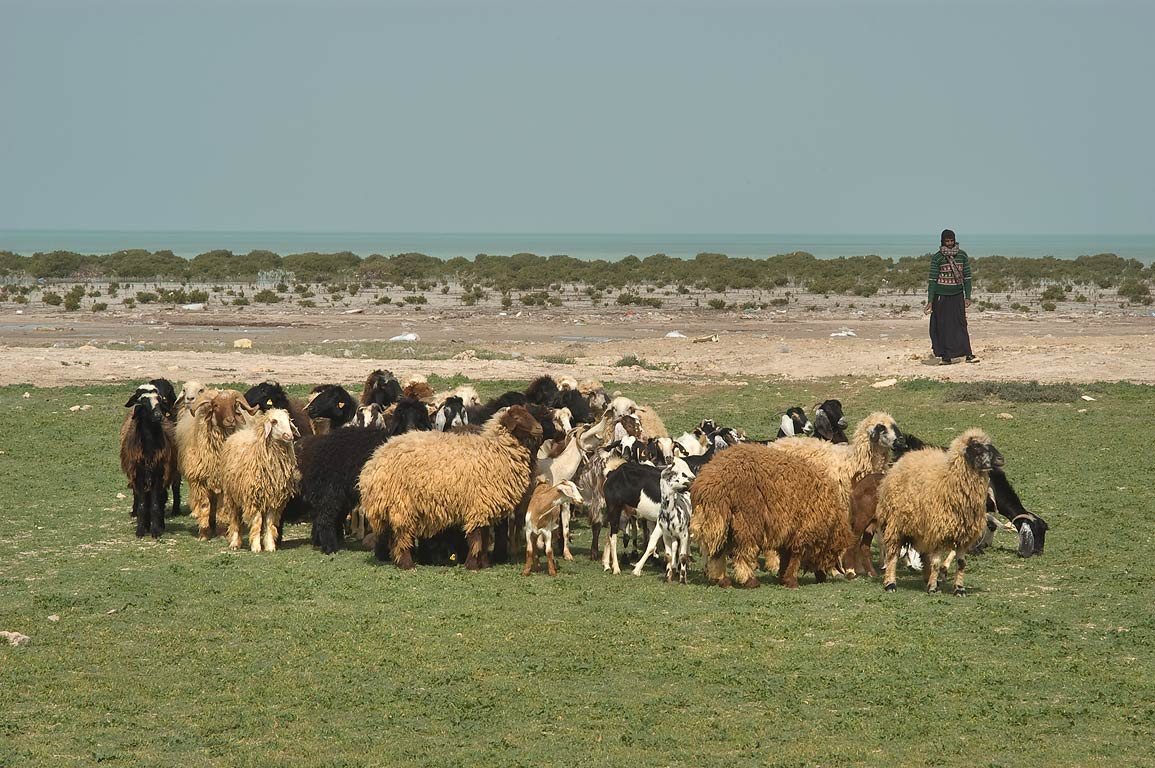
Bedouin grazing his sheep near Ruwayda, northern Qatar

It was unusual for a tribe to remain at one location for a period exceeding ten days. The average daily distance traveled by Bedouins was not very long to preserve energy and resources, only being hastened by inclement weather or far-away distances between pastures. Women were responsible for making clothing, child rearing, and preparing food. Conversely, men would hunt for game with hawks and dogs during the winter months.

Leaders of Bedouin tribes, known as sheikhs, were expected to provide charity to the poorer members of the tribe. The sheikh's wife was expected to help solve complaints brought to her by the female members of the tribe. Bedouins often lived very modestly, lacking a consistent source of income. Nonetheless, due to the cooperation and charity between tribe members, it was rare that one would go hungry except during exceptionally long droughts. After the discovery of oil in Qatar, most Qataris moved to urban areas, and the Bedouin way of life gradually disappeared. Only a few tribes in Qatar continue this lifestyle. These practices have declined due to urbanization, economic development, and the expansion of state infrastructure. Today, such traditions are often preserved symbolically as part of cultural heritage rather than functioning as primary economic activities.

=== Tents ===
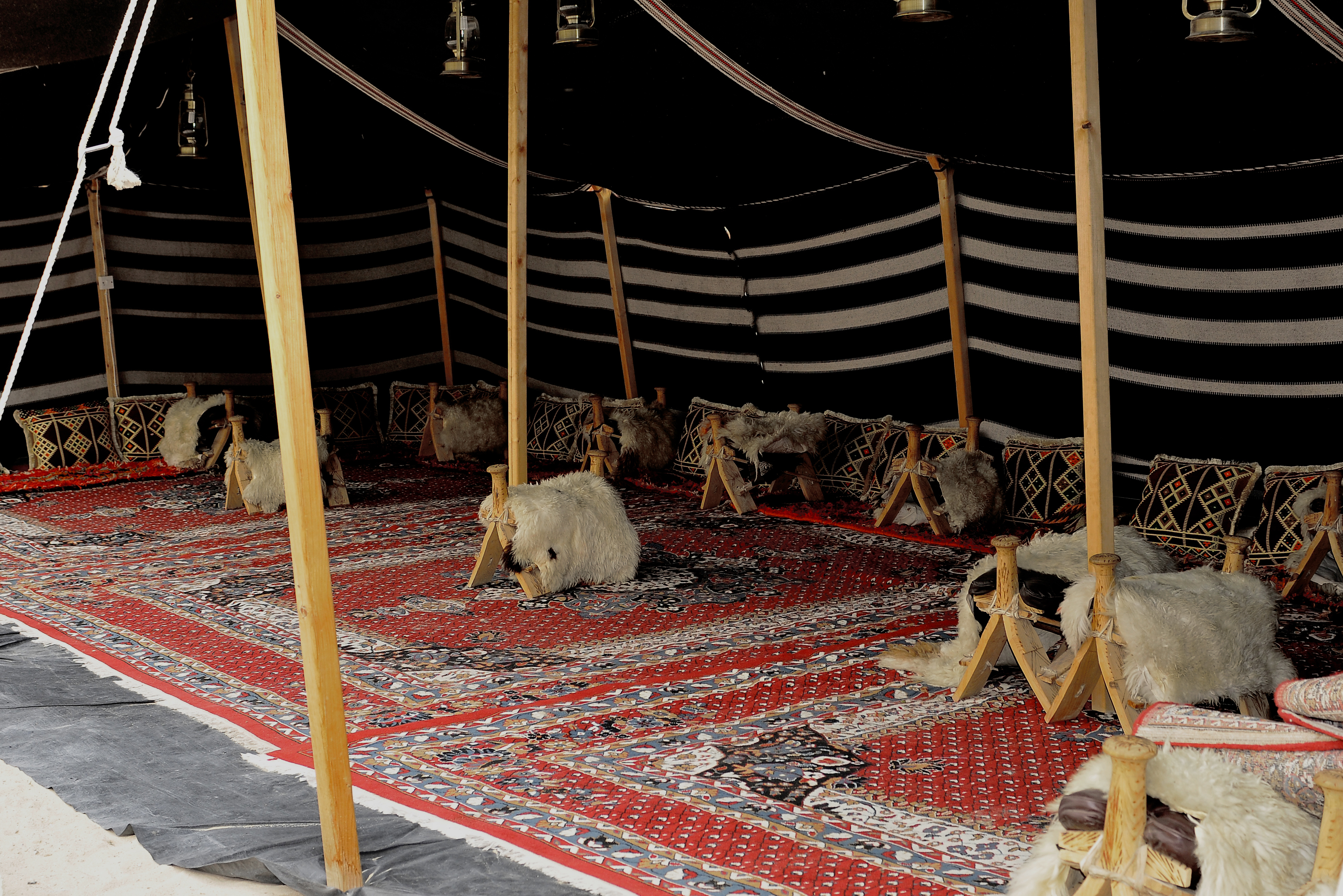
The interior of a partially enclosed traditional khaïma

Tents (khaïmas) were the primary dwellings of Bedouins and are still used in the desert. In northern Qatar, the tents were mainly uniform, with all sides of the tent being enclosed for privacy. The tent's interior comprised distinct sections, delineated by woven walls or carpets, which could be compressed to create a single space. The sections included quarters for unmarried adult men, designated guest areas, and spaces for children and young animals. Furnishings were modest, typically consisting of beddings, seating mats, and essential utensils. Typically, the central hearth served as the main gathering area for both family members and guests.

Women predominantly managed domestic affairs within the tent, including cooking, dairy processing, and crafts such as weaving and sewing. Certain livestock animals were permitted in the tent, though dogs were excluded in most instances. Camps in southern Qatar typically comprised two to seven tents and were constructed with seasonal migration in mind, though were similar in appearance to those in the north.

=== Livestock rearing ===
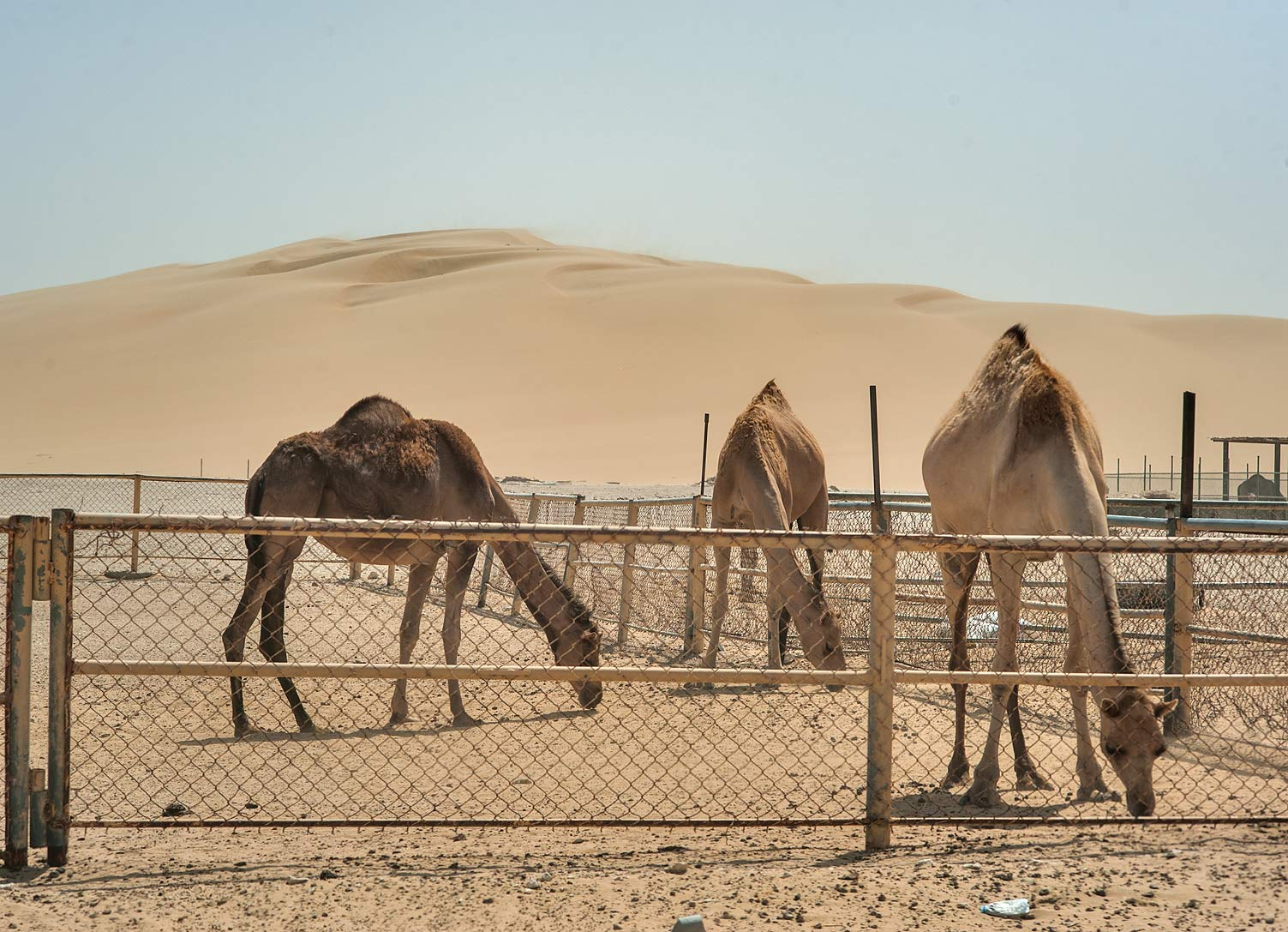
A camel farm in southern Qatar

Bedouins have traditionally been reliant on the rearing and grazing of livestock. In the north, despite the tribes leading more sedentary lives, animals such as camels, sheep, goats, cows and donkeys were commonly found. Poultry, and occasionally pigeons, were also present. Salukis were sometimes kept to hunt game. Camps consisted of 2 to 6 tents, with livestock influencing their size and arrangements; a typical tent looking after 30 to 40 animals. Livestock care, primarily the responsibility of men, included tasks such as marking, castration, and slaughtering. Women managed milking and dairy production. Camels were less prominent in the north, primarily housed by select families.

Compared to their northern counterparts, Bedouins in southern Qatar relied more on camels; for instance, the Al Murrah tribe, which is dedicated almost exclusively to camel husbandry. While some groups kept sheep and goats for supplementary purposes, camels remained the most popular livestock.

=== Camels ===
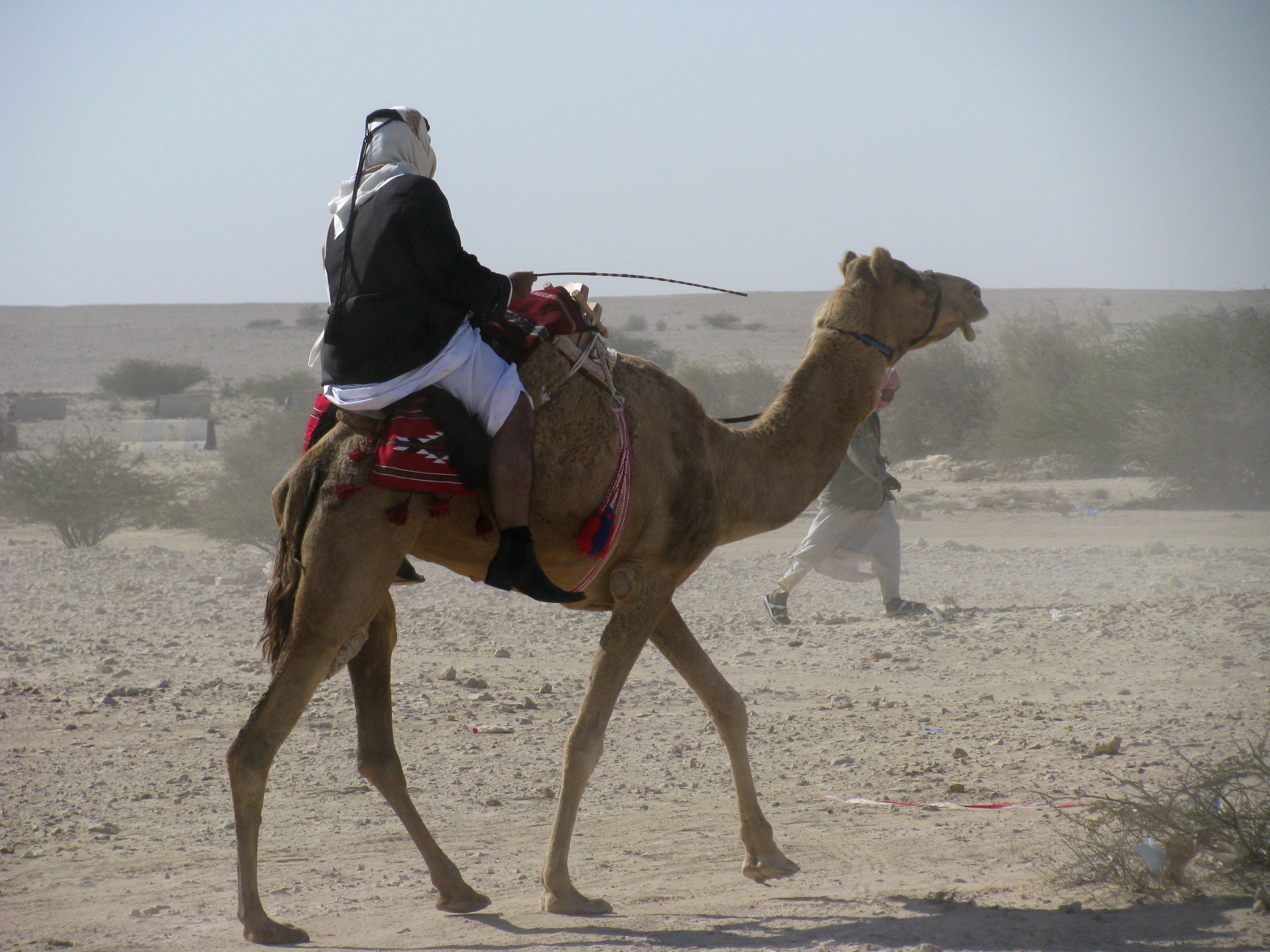
Qatari camel rider wielding a camel stick in the desert

Camels are regarded with high importance among Qatar's Bedouin tribes, having historically served as a means of transportation, as well as sources of milk, meat, and various materials. Men primarily oversee breeding and tasks like mating, castration, and branding for ownership identification. Women and children historically participated in loading and riding camels, particularly during migration periods.

=== Hunting and scavenging ===
Hunting is a prominent Bedouin tradition. While wild game was once abundant in Qatar, it had become scarce by the 20th century, with historical accounts recalling hunting with flintlock guns; however, due to the scarcity in game, it had mostly become a marginal activity. However, it remained relatively popular in southern Qatar, where Bedouins were equipped with shotguns, rifles, and falcons, particularly wakris. Hunting hounds, known as salukis, were also occasionally used for hunting to a lesser extent.

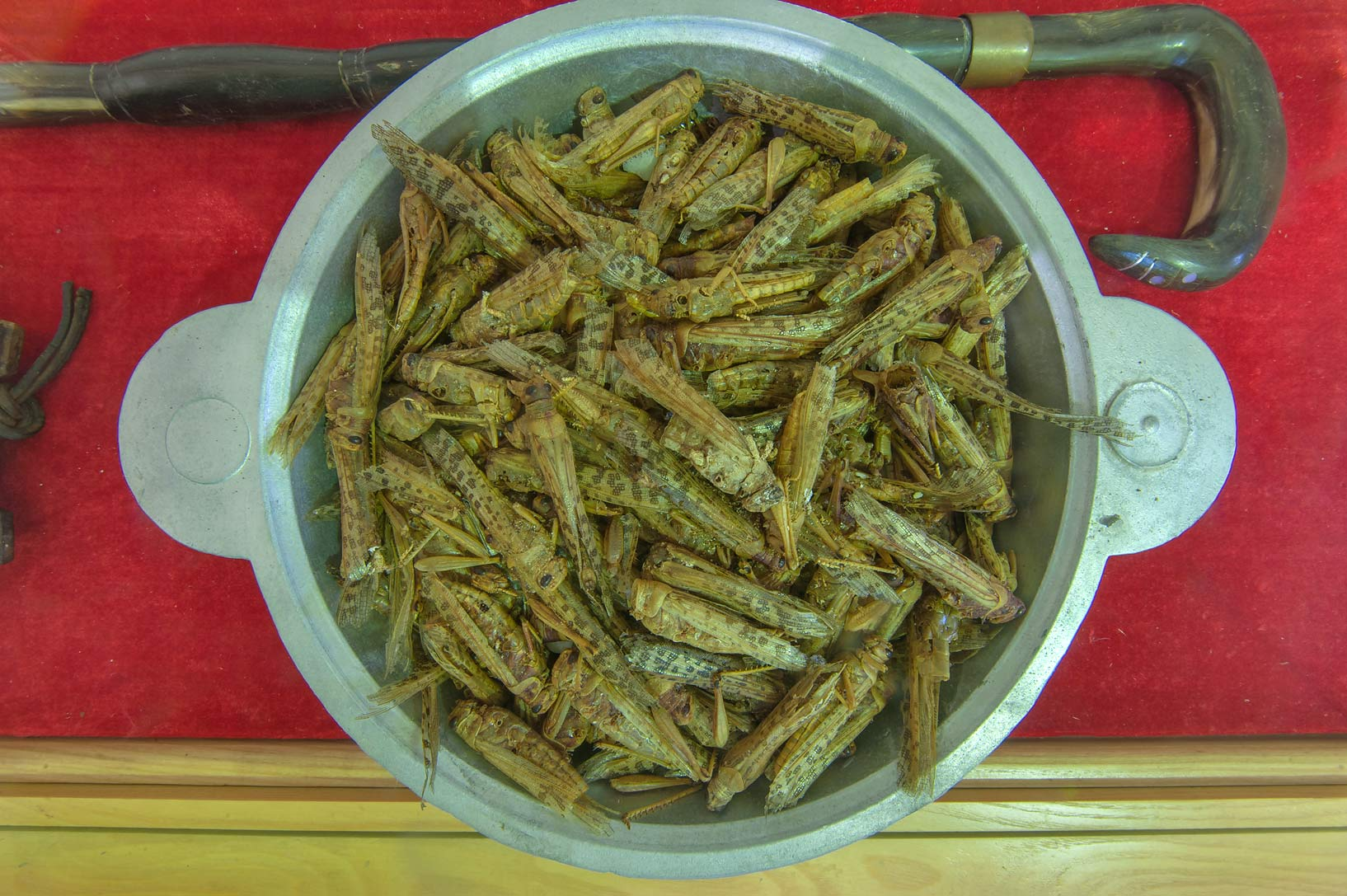
Bowl of dried locusts on museum display

Collection of natural resources, particularly during the truffle season in early spring, was another popular activity. Locusts, traditionally valued as food, were gathered during invasions, and natural resources like sea salt were collected from coastal cliffs. Firewood and shrubs were gathered for fuel prior to the advent of paraffin stoves. The salvaging of flotsam was also popular. Additionally, discarded materials from the oil industry and urban areas were systematically collected.

== Social life ==
=== Cuisine ===
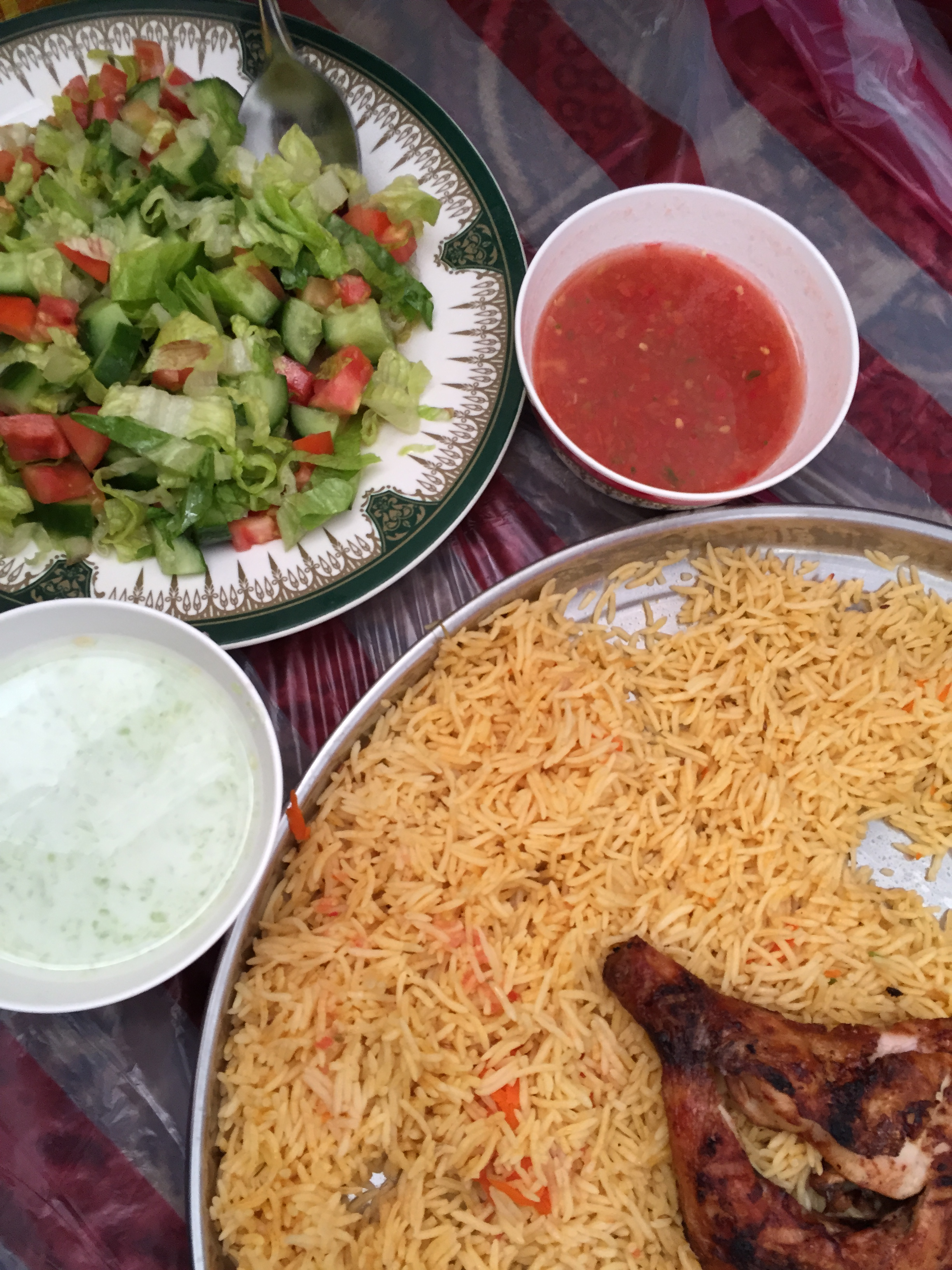
Machbous, the national dish of Qatar

Qatari cuisine reflects traditional Arab and Levantine cuisine, with heavy influences by Iranian and Indian cuisine. Seafood and dates are staple food items. As Qatar follows Shariah religious law, alcohol, and pork products cannot be brought into the country; however, alcohol is available for purchase for eligible non-Muslims. Traditional meals are usually served with guests seated on the floor, partaking of the food with their hands.

Before the meal commences, it is customary to serve Arabic coffee brewed in brass coffee pots infused with cardamom. Served in small porcelain cups, guests signal by gently shaking the cup when they have had their fill. Hot tea, typically flavored with mint and sweetened with sugar, may also be served in small glass mugs.

The national dish of Qatar is machbous (also known as kabsa), which consists of rice cooked with Arabic spices and served mainly with lamb, but also with chicken or fish. Other important dishes include mathruba, which is rice beaten with cardamom, milk, butter, and any choice of meat, until it turns into porridge form; thareed, consists of bread soaked in vegetable, spices, and chicken/lamb stew; harees, which is meat beaten with boiled ground wheat, until it turns into porridge form; and balaleet, a sweet and savory dish usually eaten for breakfast or as a dessert, which includes vermicelli cooked with sugar, rose water, cardamom, and saffron, and topped with omelet eggs.

=== Dress ===
Clothing laws punish and forbid wearing revealing or indecent clothes. A government body enforces the dressing-code law called "Al-Adheed". In 2012, a Qatari NGO organized a campaign of "public decency" after they deemed the government to be too lax in monitoring the wearing of revealing clothes, defining the latter as "not covering shoulders and knees, tight or transparent clothes". The campaign targets foreigners who constitute the majority of Qatar's population.

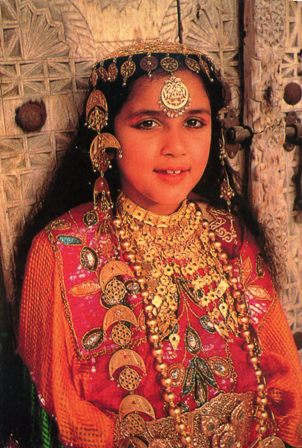
Qatari girl wearing traditional clothing

Qatari men wear thawbs (a long white shirt) over loose pants. Aside from protecting the wearer against the dangers of the sun, it also serves as a symbol of affiliation. In previous decades, different types of thawbs were used depending on the occasion, though this is seldom the case in present-day. They also wear a loose headdress, a ghutra, which comes in white or red. Around the ghutra is a black rope called agal, which holds it in place.

Qatari women generally wear customary dresses that include the black colored body covering known as the abaya together with the black scarf used for covering their heads known as the shayla. A burqa is sometimes worn to conceal their face. It is thought that Qatari women began using face masks in the 19th century amid substantial immigration. As they had no practical ways of concealing their faces from foreigners, they began wearing the same face mask as their Persian counterparts. Young girls wear a bukhnoq, an embroidered cloth covering the hair and the upper section of the body, prior to the age of marriage.

=== Social welfare ===
Qatar has been described as a rentier state that has allocated a significant portion of its wealth from hydrocarbon exports towards the social welfare of its citizens, in a sense, "buying their loyalty". The ruling House of Thani uses such policies to maintain their legitimacy.

In the state's early years, wealth distribution was often unequal, benefiting primarily members of the ruling family and those with governmental positions. The country's infrastructure and social services developed at a relatively slow pace, with the share of oil wealth being split between basic needs like electricity, water, healthcare, and education, and the ruler's personal treasury. However, protests during the reign of Ahmad bin Ali Al Thani (1960–1972) led to a more equitable distribution of oil revenues, known as the "quarter rule". His successor, Khalifa bin Hamad Al Thani, furthered this trend by increasing social welfare, housing benefits, and salary increments.

In addition to providing essential services like healthcare and education free of charge to citizens, there are no taxes and several state benefits, including land grants, interest-free loans, scholarships for students studying abroad, and guaranteed civil service jobs. As a result of these benefits, some political analysts have described Qatari citizens as "too rich to care" about disrupting the political system or questioning the legitimacy of its ruler. Benefits and privileges afforded can vary depending on the social standing of a family.

=== Ethnic groups ===
The Qatari population reflects its status as a pearling hub and a rangeland for nomadic Arab tribes, with distinct separations between the Bedouins, comprising approximately 10% of Qatar's native population, and the hadar, settled urban dwellers. Ethnic differences are rarely acknowledged or discussed in formal contexts.

Bedouins mainly consist of nomadic tribes which migrated from Najd and Al-Hasa in the 18th century, with some retaining Saudi or other Gulf states' citizenship. Comprising approximately 10% of Qataris, many are employed in the oil industry, police, army, and security services. The government launched initiatives to settle Bedouin families in the 1960s. Some Bedouins consider themselves as "pure" Arabs in contrast to the settled population (hadar), which they perceive as being influenced by urban and Persian elements.

The hadar is a term used to encompass settled Qataris, including Baharna, Huwala, Ajam (Iranians), and Afro-Arabs. The Baharna, an Arab group native to Eastern Arabia and mostly Shia Muslim, sometimes face discrimination from the Sunni majority. Huwala Arabs are Sunni Muslims who migrated through the Persian Gulf to Persia and back to Qatar, and have historically been wealthier and better-educated due to profits from pearl trading. The Ajam are ethnic Shia Persians who were historically active in boat building and still speak Persian. The country's Afro-Arab population descends from slaves brought from East Africa for the pearling industry. While some Arabs may view this group as "less" Qatari, most consider them full citizens. Intermarriage has increased over time, and Persian and African influences are evident in local culture.

=== Foreigners ===
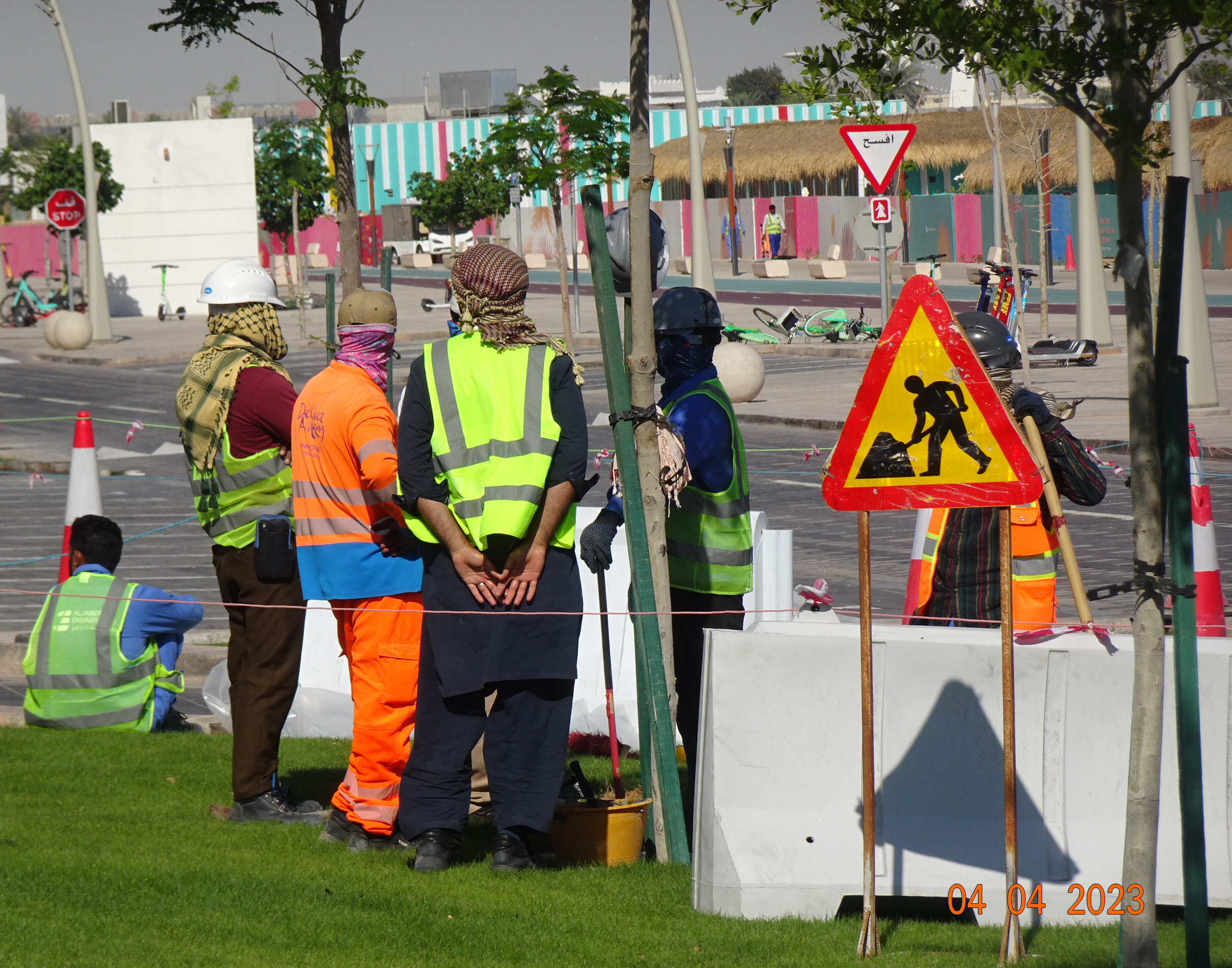
Construction laborers in Doha

Foreigners constitute 85% to 90% of Qatar's population of 2.7 million, with migrant workers making up approximately 95% of the workforce. Most migrants originate from South Asia and Southeast Asia. There exists a degree of societal divisions based on nationality, with Europeans, North Americans, and Arabs typically securing better job opportunities and social privileges than sub-Saharan Africans and South Asians. Barriers such as language and cultural differences limit the social opportunities between Qataris and foreigners.

The human rights of migrant workers is limited by the country's Kafala system, which stipulates a Qatari sponsor and restricts their entry and exit. Migrant workers are often exploited by paying recruitment fees which surpass government-set limits, ranging from $600 to $5,000 and frequently placing workers into debt. Furthermore, some Qatari companies violate local labor laws, and some have been implicated in non-payment of or delay in wages, as well as incomplete pay slips which hinders remittances. Many employers also confiscate their employees' passports, which restricts their freedom of movement.

=== Cultural diversity ===
Qatar has a highly diverse population, with expatriates making up a significant majority of residents. This demographic structure has had a major impact on cultural life, shaping everyday social interactions, labor systems, and cultural practices. Migrant communities contribute to the circulation of languages, cuisines, and cultural traditions, making Qatari society more heterogeneous than traditional representations suggest.

At the same time, cultural expression in Qatar is influenced by state policies that seek to preserve national identity while managing rapid economic and social change. As a result, contemporary culture reflects both long-standing traditions and the effects of globalization, urbanization, and migration.

=== Language ===
Arabic is the official language of Qatar according to Article 1 of the Constitution. Arabic in Qatar is the medium of official communication, legislation, and education. The government has instituted policies to reinforce the use of Arabic, including the Arabic Language Protection Law enacted in 2019, which mandates the use of Arabic in governmental and public functions and penalizes non-compliance. Arabic speakers constitute a minority of the 2.8 million population, at around 11%.

Qatari Arabic, a dialect of Gulf Arabic, is the primary dialect spoken and the country's prestige dialect. The vocabulary of Qatari Arabic incorporates many loanwords from Aramaic, Persian, Turkish, and more recently, English. Phonetically, it conserves many classical Arabic features such as emphatic consonants and interdental sounds, in contrast to other Arabic dialects which simplified these elements. Due to the status of English as the prestige lingua franca in Qatar, some speakers of Qatari Arabic have incorporated English elements into their everyday speech, colloquially known as Qatarese. The practice of interchanging English and Arabic words is known as code-switching and is mostly seen in urban areas and among the younger generation.

English is the de facto second language of Qatar, and is very commonly used in business. Because of Qatar's multiethnic population, English has been recognized as the most convenient medium for people of different backgrounds to communicate with each other. The most common Asian languages among Qatar's migrants are Hindi, Urdu, Tagalog, Bengali, Tamil, Telugu and Malayalam. Hindi and Malayalam are particularly prevalent, with large communities of speakers from India.

=== Religion ===
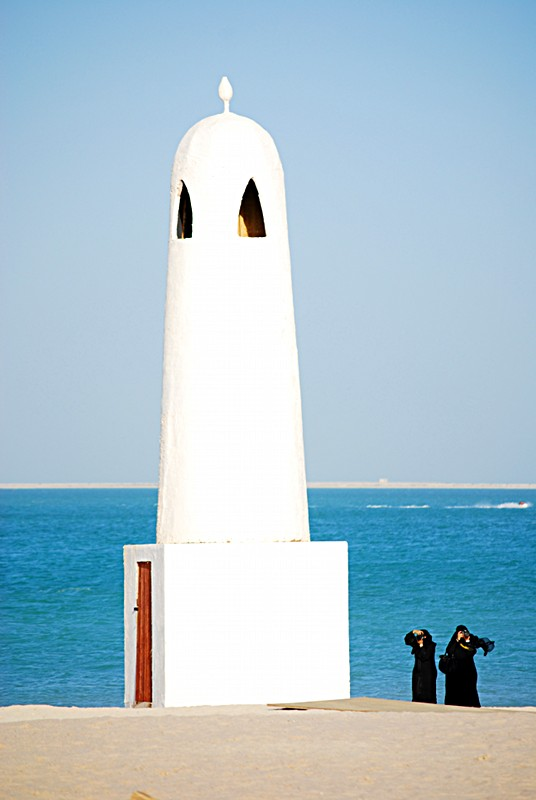
Islam is Qatar's state religion

The state religion in Qatar is Islam. Most Qataris belong to the Sunni sect of Islam. Shiites comprise around 10% of Qatar's Muslim population. Religious policy is set by the Ministry of Islamic Affairs. Islamic instruction is compulsory for Muslims in all state-sponsored schools. According to tradition, the inhabitants of Qatar converted to Islam in 628. Prior to this, Qatar was part of a region with a largely Christian presence known as Beth Qaṭraye.

The community is made up of Sunni and Shi’a Muslims, Christians, Hindus, and small groups of Buddhists and Baha’is. Muslims form 65.5% of the Qatari population, followed by Christians at 15.4%, Hindus at 14.2%, Buddhists at 3.3% and the rest 1.9% of the population follow other religions or are unaffiliated. Qatar is also home to numerous other religions mainly from the Middle East and Asia.

At the end of 2013, there were a total of 1,848 mosques recorded in the country. The country's state mosque is Imam Muhammad ibn Abd al-Wahhab Mosque, which was named in honor of the Salafi Muhammad ibn Abd al-Wahhab of the Najd. Other important mosques are the Katara Mosque, the Education City Mosque, and the Fanar, Qatar Islamic Cultural Center.

== Customs and beliefs ==
=== Al-Majlis ===
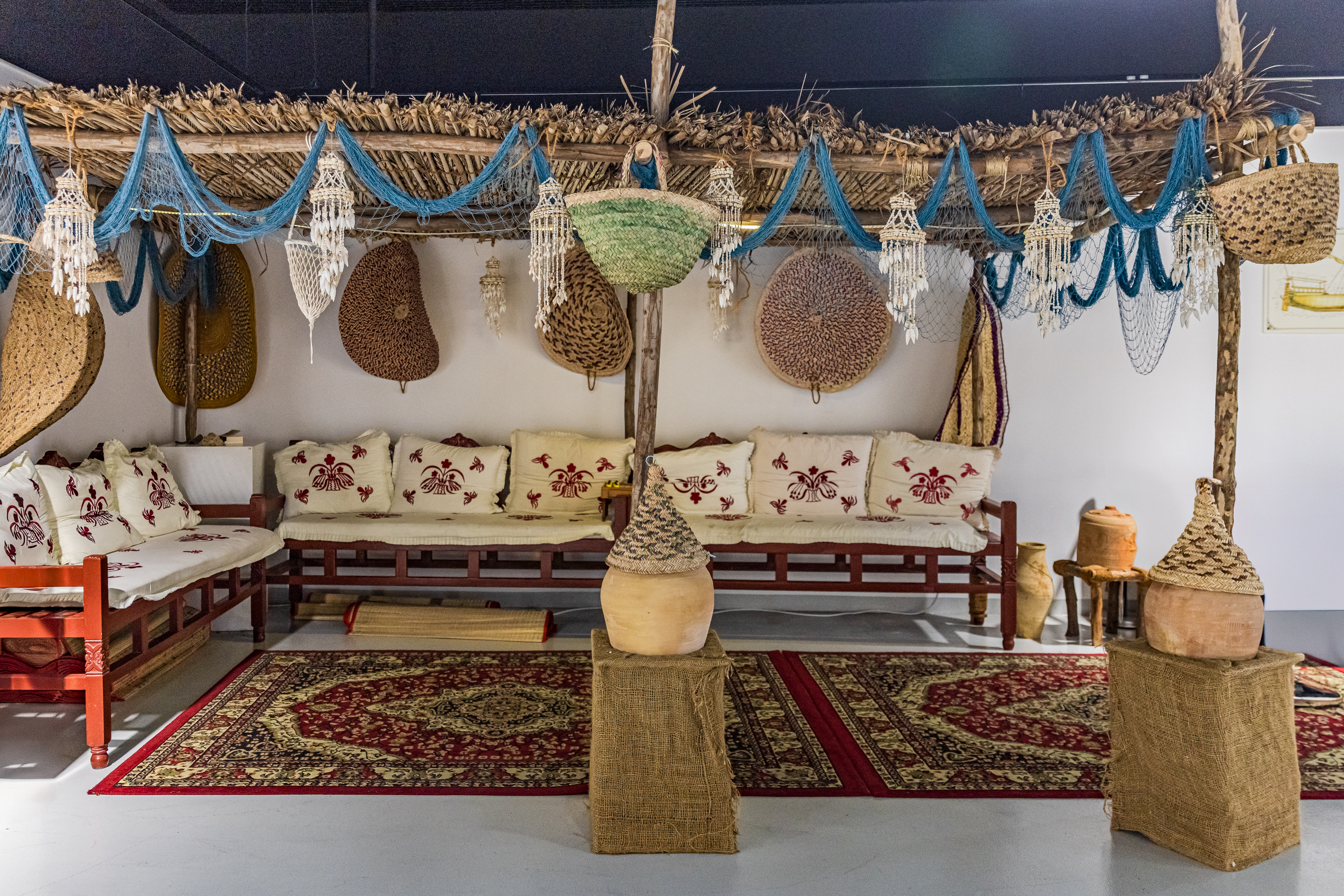
A traditional majlis in Qatar

The majlis is ubiquitous in the Arab states of the Persian Gulf and serves as a place where friends and neighbors discuss matters of mutual interest, customarily over cups of Arabic coffee. Historically, the dour, or spacious rooms designated for these gatherings, hosted seafarers between pearl fishing seasons, where they engaged in al-samra, evenings of song and dance, during weddings and other occasions for entertainment.

The majlis also historically served as a means of communal discussion and conflict resolution, prioritizing the authority of elder members. The majlis also imparts moral and cultural values to its younger audience.

On 4 December 2015, the majlis was inscribed on UNESCO's List of Intangible Cultural Heritage in a joint filing by Saudi Arabia, United Arab Emirates, Oman, and Qatar.

=== Arabic coffee and dates ===
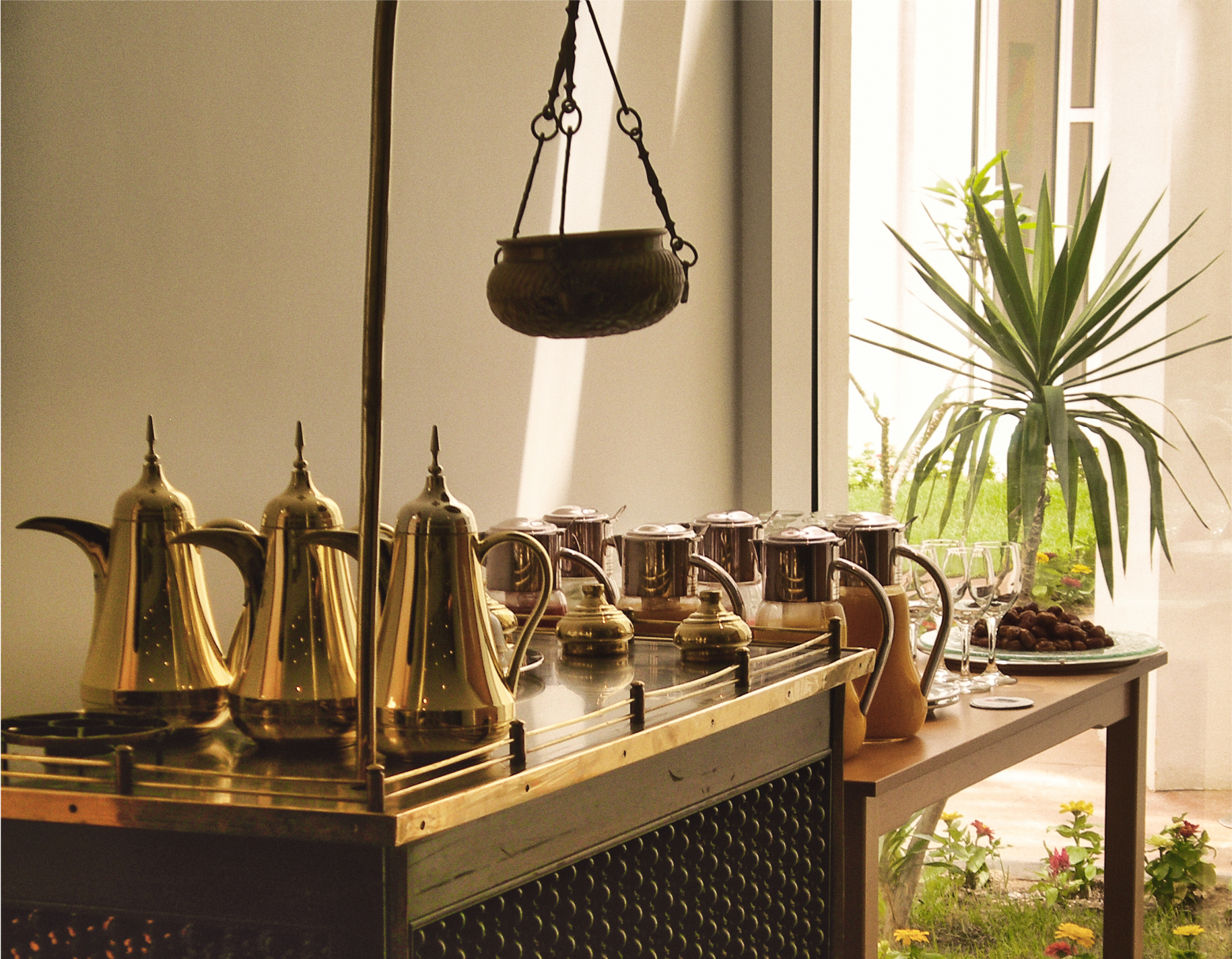
Gahwa and dates prepared for visitors

As the national fruit of Qatar, dates have both cultural and culinary importance, particularly during Ramadan, when they are consumed to break fast. They are also considered a symbol of hospitality, along with Arabic coffee. Qatar's history in date cultivation is thought to date back thousands of years, and is represented in the Qatari national emblem, which features two date palms alongside a traditional dhow. They are celebrated annually during festivals, such as the annual Local Dates Festival held in Souq Waqif.

Arabic coffee (gahwa) is among the most popular beverages in Qatar and is served in a coffee pot known as a dallah. The preparation of Arabic coffee typically involves the use of high-quality green coffee beans, saffron, cardamom, cloves, and other traditional ingredients, and are sometimes ground by hand.

=== Oud and bukhoor ===
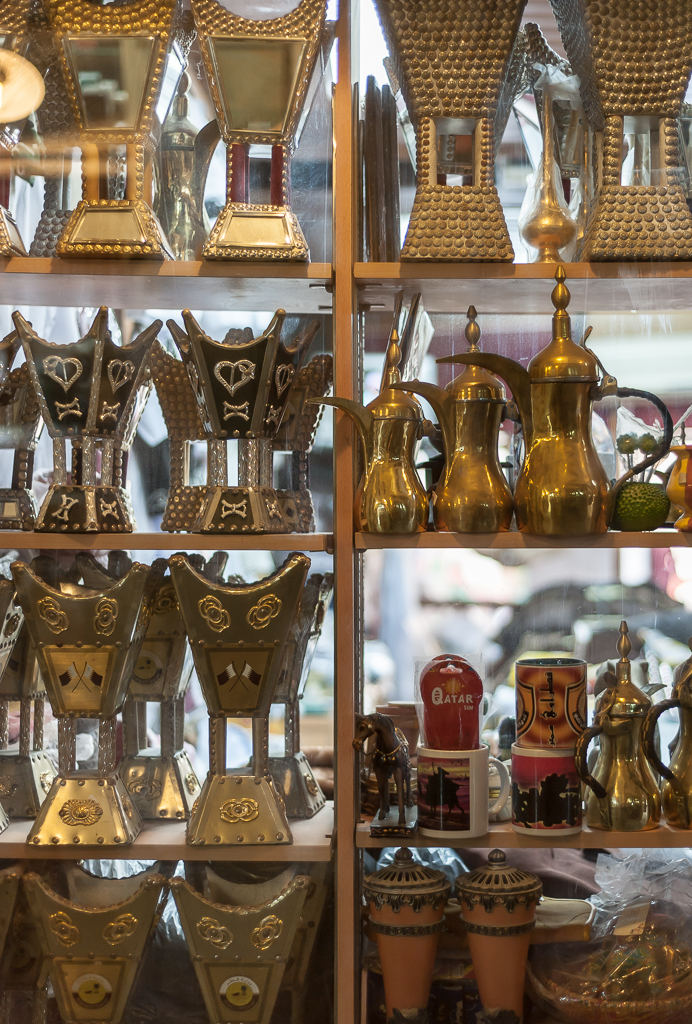
Different types of mabkharas on display at Souq Waqif

Oud, originating from a resin extracted from the agar (Aquilaria) tree, is commonly used in Qatari households and on ceremonial occasions. Incense, known locally as bukhoor, is also frequently used. Made from fragrant woods, it is ignited within a specialized vessel called a mabkhara, emitting smoke that fills the home and imbues clothing with its fragrance. Moreover, as a gesture of hospitality, guests are often encouraged to participate in the tradition of enveloping themselves in the smoke.

=== Folk beliefs ===
Many of Qatar's folk beliefs are based on religion, with some beliefs aimed at invoking divine protection or warding off harm. For instance, the breaking of an object was interpreted as the removal of evil, while the call to prayer occurring ahead of schedule prompted concerns of impending danger. A popular folk belief states that it is inadvisable to pass in front of someone who is praying, as this may sever their divine connection.

Several superstitions exist in local culture, most with the aim of avoiding perceived dangers. For example, funeral prayers were often recited for individuals believed to harbor envy, accompanied by discreetly sprinkling salt behind one's backs for protection. One superstition warned that open scissors could cause conflict between family members, while another warned that sleeping on one's back would cause nightmares due to the shaitan's (devil) presence during sleep.

Cautionary tales included those that warn against gazing directly at lightning to prevent blindness, as well as avoiding displaying the bottom soles of shoes, as it was perceived as disrespectful to Allah. Other taboos included sweeping floors at night, as this would disturb potential djinn residing in homes, and biting one's tongue during meals, as this was interpreted as sign of impending bad luck. Some folk beliefs were health-related, resulting in traditional remedies such as consuming specific foods like senna blends or crab meat and shrimp soup, which were thought to cure various ailments.

== Holidays and ceremonies ==
Qatar's weekends are Friday and Saturday. In 2009, Cabinet Decision No. 33 was passed by the Emir, decreeing the first Sunday in March as an official holiday for all financial institutions in Qatar.

=== Ramadan ===
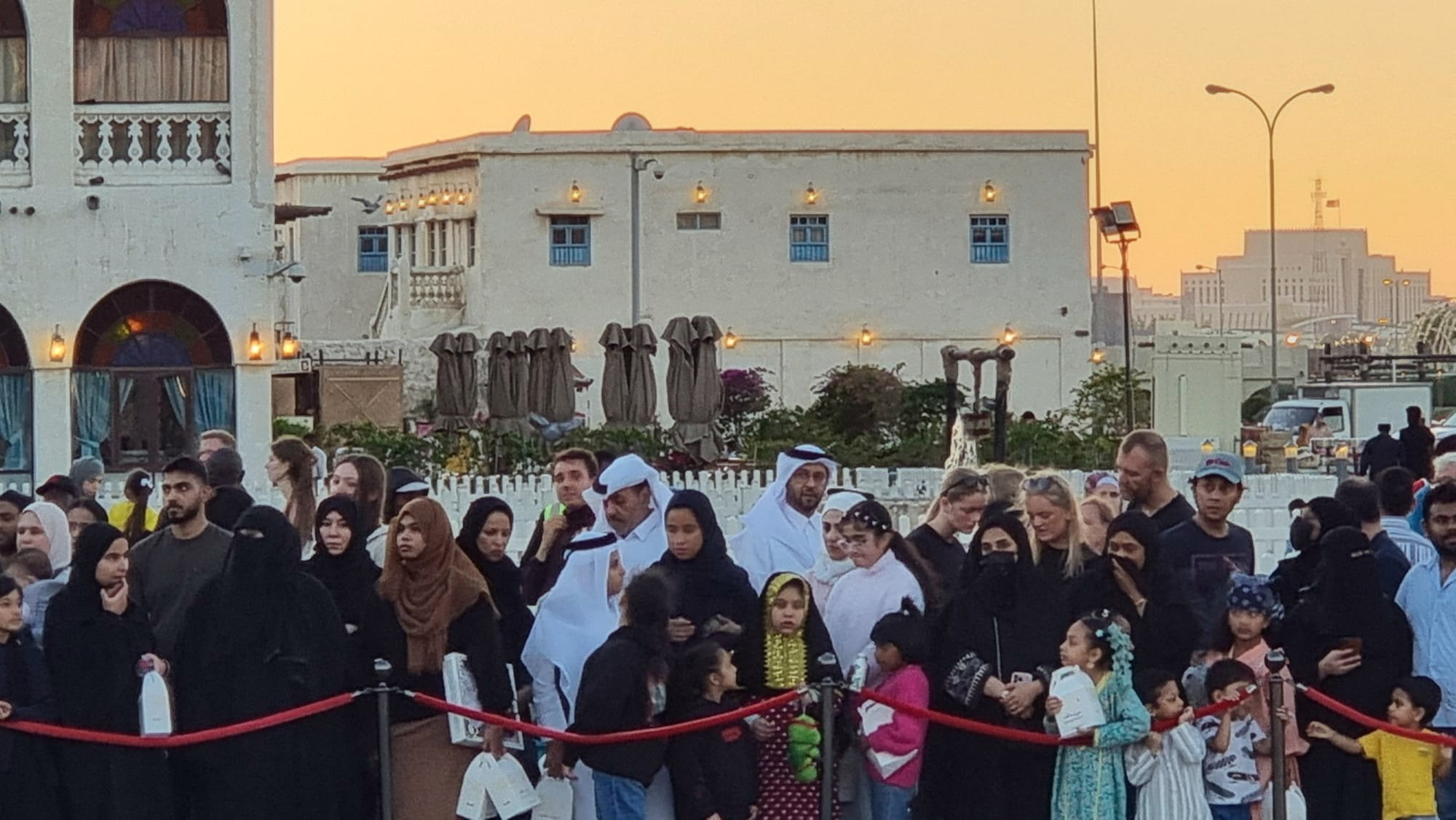
Onlookers gathered to watch to the Ramadan cannon at Souq Waqif

Ramadan, the ninth month of the Islamic calendar, is characterized by the obligatory observation of fasting (sawm), wherein adherents abstain from consuming food and beverages from dawn until dusk. In Qatar, the beginning of Ramadan is determined by the Moon Sighting Committee, within the Ministry of Awqaf and Islamic Affairs, which observes the crescent moon, signaling both the conclusion of Ramadan and the onset of Eid al-Fitr, the festival of breaking the fast.

Prior to fasting, Qataris observe the Sha'ban, the month prior to Ramadan, with Al-Nafla festivities. During these festivities, families share traditional meals such as harees and tharid with neighbors and the less fortunate.

The daily fast begins at sunrise following the consumption of suhur, a meal intended to keep individuals nourished throughout the day. In the past, al-musaharati roamed the farjan (neighborhoods) during Ramadan, beating his drum and reciting poetry to wake people up for suhur. Iftar, the meal marking the fast's conclusion at sunset, typically begins with the consumption of dates. This is accompanied by the firing of a Ramadan cannon, a tradition which is broadcast live on national television and can be observed at locations such as Souq Waqif, Katara Cultural Village and Imam Muhammad ibn Abd al-Wahhab Mosque.

Al Ghabqa, a feast that takes place at night during Ramadan following iftar and tarawih prayers, features various dishes such as grilled and fried fish, rice cooked with date extract, and tharid. It also typically offers an assortment of sweets such as luqaimat and asida, alongside dates, tea, and Arabic coffee.

=== Garangao ===
Garangao is celebrated on the 15th night of Ramadan. The name derives from the Arabic word garqaa, denoting a rattling or shaking motion. It is celebrated throughout the Middle East, with slight variations. On Garangao night, children wear colorful attire and visit homes, singing traditional songs and receiving sweets and gifts from residents. In contemporary times, Garangao is celebrated on a larger scale, with events taking place in shopping malls, mosques, and cultural organizations.

=== Eid ===
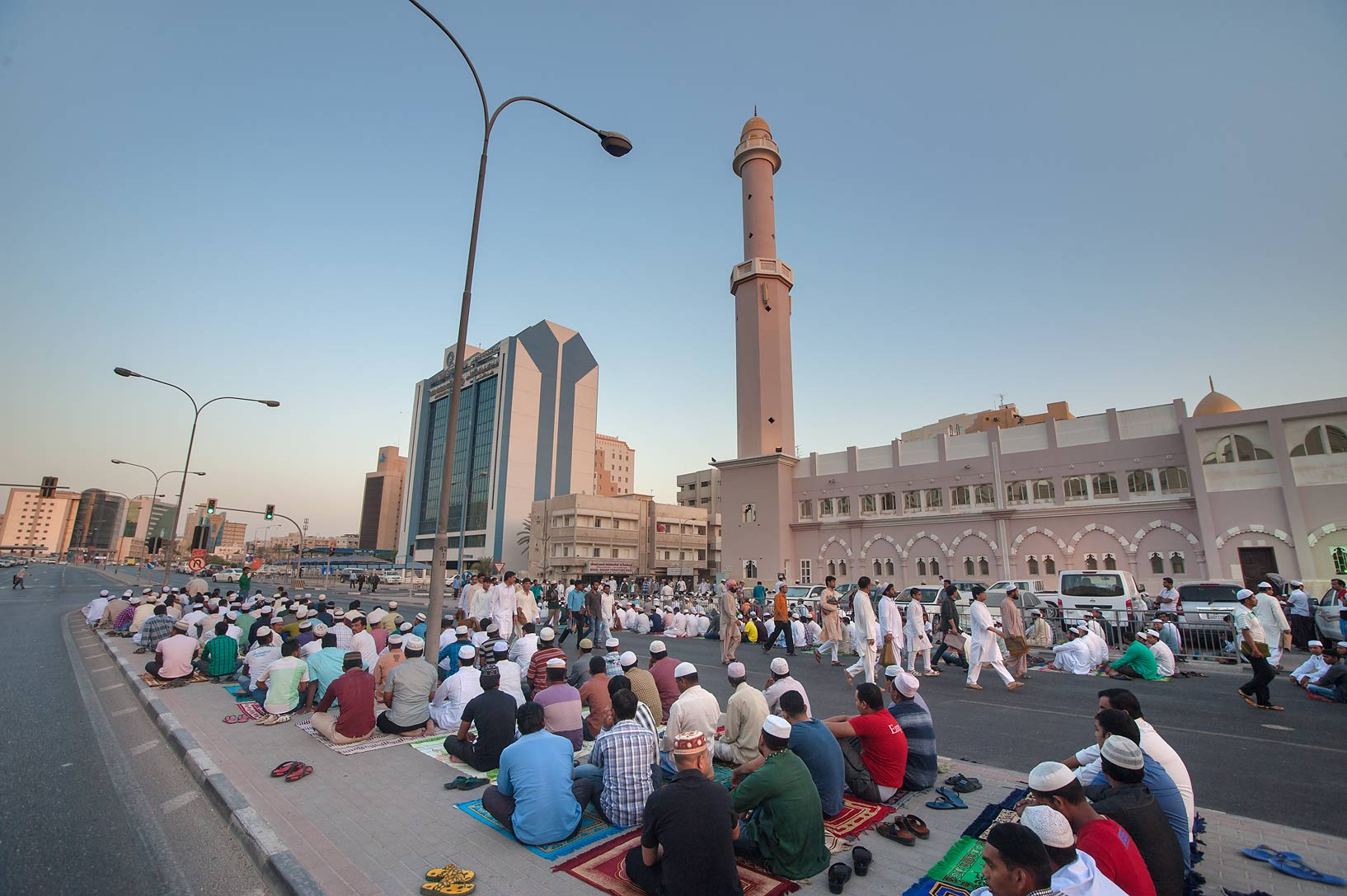
Eid al-Adha prayer near Al Asmakh Mosque in old Doha

The two Eid holidays, celebrated by all Muslims, are Eid al-Fitr and Eid al-Adha.

==== Eid al-Fitr ====
Eid al-Fitr, translating to the "festivity of breaking the fast", takes place on the first day of the tenth month. Designated a nationwide holiday in Qatar, educational institutions, offices, and commercial establishments are closed during this period. Many related events take place at shopping centers and public arenas. Applying henna is customary for Qatari women during Eid al-Fitr. The inaugural Eid Al-Fitr Festival, organized by Qatar Tourism, was launched on 4 May 2022 and lasted for three days. Celebrations were held on the Doha Corniche featuring musical performances; it was estimated that about 10,000 to 15,000 spectators attended each day.

==== Eid al-Adha ====
Eid al-Adha, known as the "celebration of sacrifice", occurs during the conclusion of Hajj, the pilgrimage to Mecca. This event is observed on the tenth day of Dhu'l-Hijja (12th month), where families meet for prayers and feasts. Traditionally, donating meat to the less privileged is practiced during this day.

Throughout Eid festivities, children in Qatar travel door-to-door singing folk songs and phrases to receive their eidiyah, a customary monetary gift. Eid greetings like "Eid Mubarak" and "Eid Saeed" convey blessings and joy, while "Kul 'am wa enta bi-khair" conveys wishes for good health and prosperity.

=== Qatar National Day ===
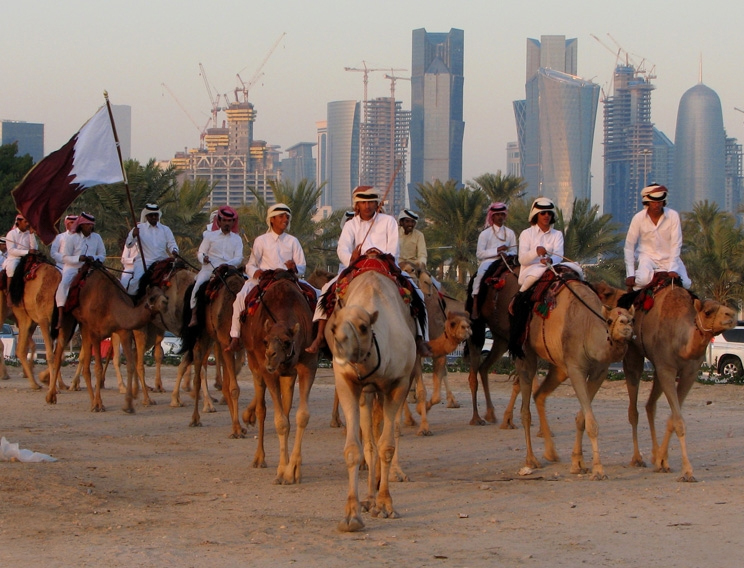
Camel parade during Qatar National Day

Qatar National Day is an annual celebration of the date that Jassim bin Mohammed Al Thani succeeded his father Mohammed bin Thani as ruler of Qatar, uniting its tribes and earning the country additional autonomy. In 2008, the date of the Qatar National Day was changed from 3 September to 18 December, to reflect the exact date of succession.

Various activities and events mark the day. The largest of these events is the Qatar National Day Parade, which takes place along the Doha Corniche and includes the showcasing of military equipment, folk music and firework shows. Events also take place at Souq Waqif and Katara Cultural Village.

In the days preceding Qatar National Day, the Darb Al Saai festival, organized by Qatar's Ministry of Culture, is held in Umm Salal Mohammed. Activities include the ceremonial flag-raising, military performances, and local musicians' live performances of sea music. The event also features exhibitions and workshops on traditional crafts and folklore.

=== National Sports Day ===
Qatar's National Sports Day has been celebrated annually on the second Tuesday of February as a recognized holiday since its inaugural edition in 2012. It features activities promoting fitness and well-being.

Various events take place at venues such as Education City, Aspire Park, and the Doha Corniche. In collaboration with the Qatar Olympic Committee and the Ministry of Sports and Youth, these events feature activities such as races, yoga, golf, team sports, and educational workshops, complemented by appearances from sports personalities.

=== Weddings ===
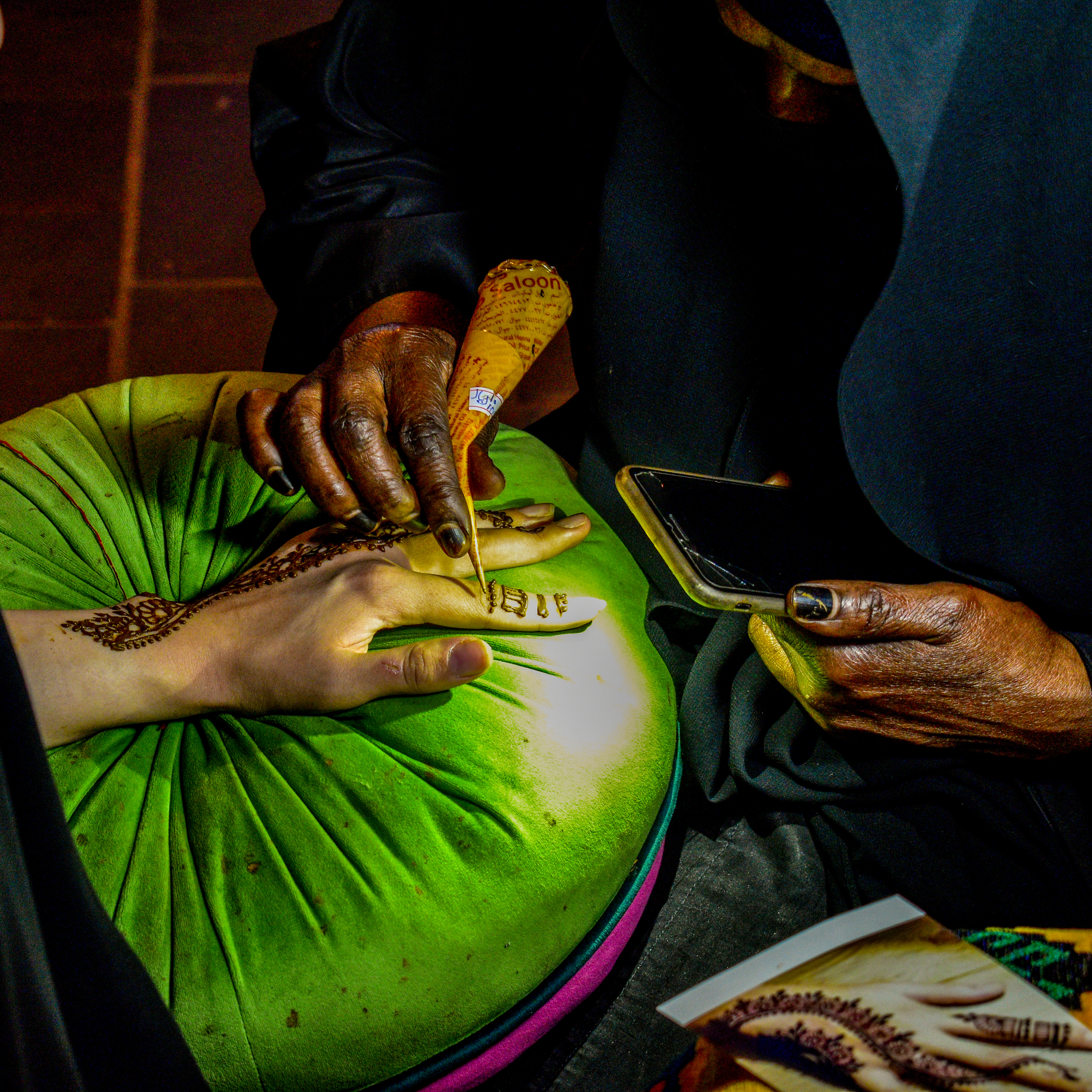
Application of henna at Souq Waqif

Historically in Qatar, invitations to the wedding were sent out in urban areas but not used among Bedouin tribes due to weddings being an intrinsically public affair. The khella, the room where the bride and groom spend their first night, undergo extensive preparation. They are furnished and decorated luxuriously, with the lower class families borrowing from relatives and friends, and the upperclass families being able to afford luxuries such as mirrors and scarce fabrics.

Prior to a marriage, it was customary for women to undergo elaborate embellishment rituals, particularly the application of henna. Traditionally, women within the family undertook the task of henna preparation and application, using natural ingredients. In modern-day, many women visit professional henna artists and specialized salons which offer intricate designs and tattoo patterns. On occasion, semi-public ceremonies are held during the henna application.

== Sports and recreation ==
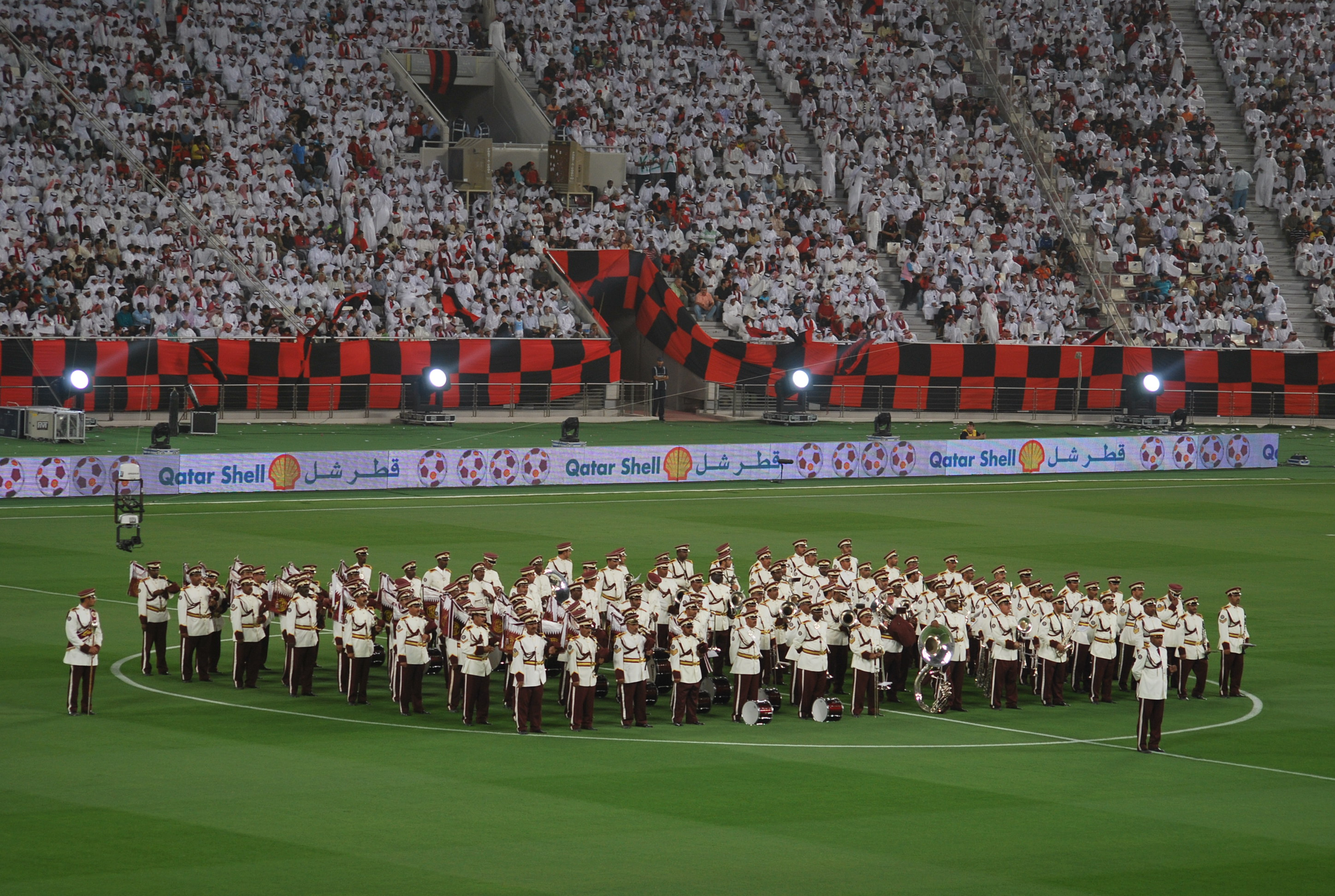
National anthem being performed prior to an Emir Cup final.

Football is the most popular sport in regards to registered player base. Additionally, athletics, basketball, handball, volleyball, camel racing, horse racing, falconry, cricket and swimming are widely practiced. There are currently 11 multi-sports clubs in the country, and 7 single-sports clubs. Qatar hosted the AFC Asian Cup in 1988, 2011 and 2023. They won the competition for the first time in the 2019 edition, after defeating Japan 3–1 in the final. Qatar would successfully retain their title on home soil, following a 3–1 victory against Jordan in the 2023 final held in Lusail. Qatar hosted the 2022 FIFA World Cup and is the first Arab nation to have done so.

Aside from football, handball and basketball are the next two popular team sports. Handball was introduced to the country in 1968; however, Qatar did not join the International Handball Federation until the 1970s. The Qatar men's national handball team qualified for the IHF World Men's Handball Championship on four occasions, and automatically qualified for a fifth as host. Qatar came runners-up to France in the 2015 World Handball Championship held on home soil, however the tournament was marred by various controversies. Qatar has won the Asian Men's Handball Championship title four times in a row in 2014, 2016, 2018 and 2020. In April 2023, FIBA announced that Qatar will host the upcoming 2027 FIBA Basketball World Cup. This will make Qatar the first in the Arab world to host the FIBA Basketball World Cup and the second Muslim country to host after the 2010 edition in Turkey. The 2027 FIBA Basketball World Cup will be the 20th tournament of the FIBA Basketball World Cup for men's national basketball teams.

The tradition of hunting for game in the desert uses mainly falcons. However, saluki dogs are also used for hunting in the desert, primarily because of their great speeds. Their main prey in the desert are gazelles and rabbits.

=== Falconry ===
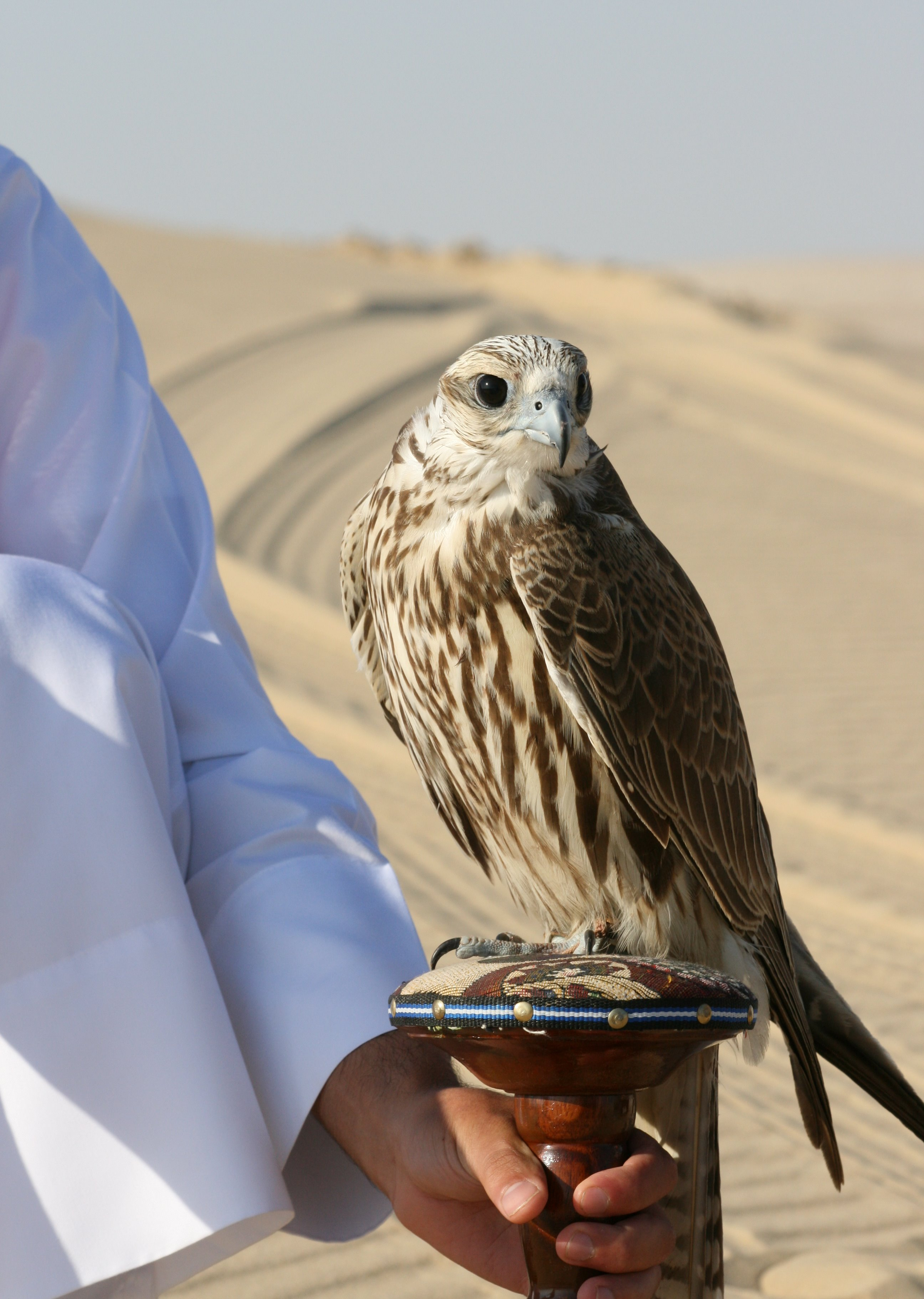
A captive Saker falcon used in falconry in the deserts of Qatar

Falconry has been a popular cultural practice in Qatar for centuries. On average, a falcon can go for anywhere from $4,000 to $10,000; a price of $250,000 was even recorded at an auction in 2022. Due to the high prices of hunting falcons, it is mainly practiced by upper-class citizens able to afford the investment. The only falconry association is Al Gannas, which was founded in 2008 in the Katara Cultural Village and which hosts the Annual Falconry Festival, also known as S'hail. Hunting season extends from October to April.

Falconers are often required to be well-versed in matters such avian anatomy and behavior, as the selection of an efficient hunting falcon is dependent on several physical factors which are not immediately apparent to the layperson, such as feathers and coloration. Furthermore, falconers typically require adequate transportation means to traverse the desert, as they typically travel great distances in search of game, with the plains of Saudi Arabia, Sudan and Pakistan being popular destinations. The most popular local venue for falconry is the Falcon Souq at Souq Waqif in Doha. Among the activities that take place here are auctions for expensive birds, the process of taming, and veterinary care for falcons, which is usually provided at the Souq Waqif Falcon Hospital.

=== Camel racing ===
Camel racing is a historically important sport in the country, and is considered a tradition among Qatar's Bedouin tribes, occurring during special occasions such as weddings. The Qatari government has invested heavily in the sport through initiatives implemented by the Camel Racing Organizing Committee (Hejan), such as inaugurating the Al-Shahaniya Arena in 1990, which has modern facilities such as illuminated tracks for nighttime races. The committee has also implemented modern registration systems, such as electronic services for camel owners.

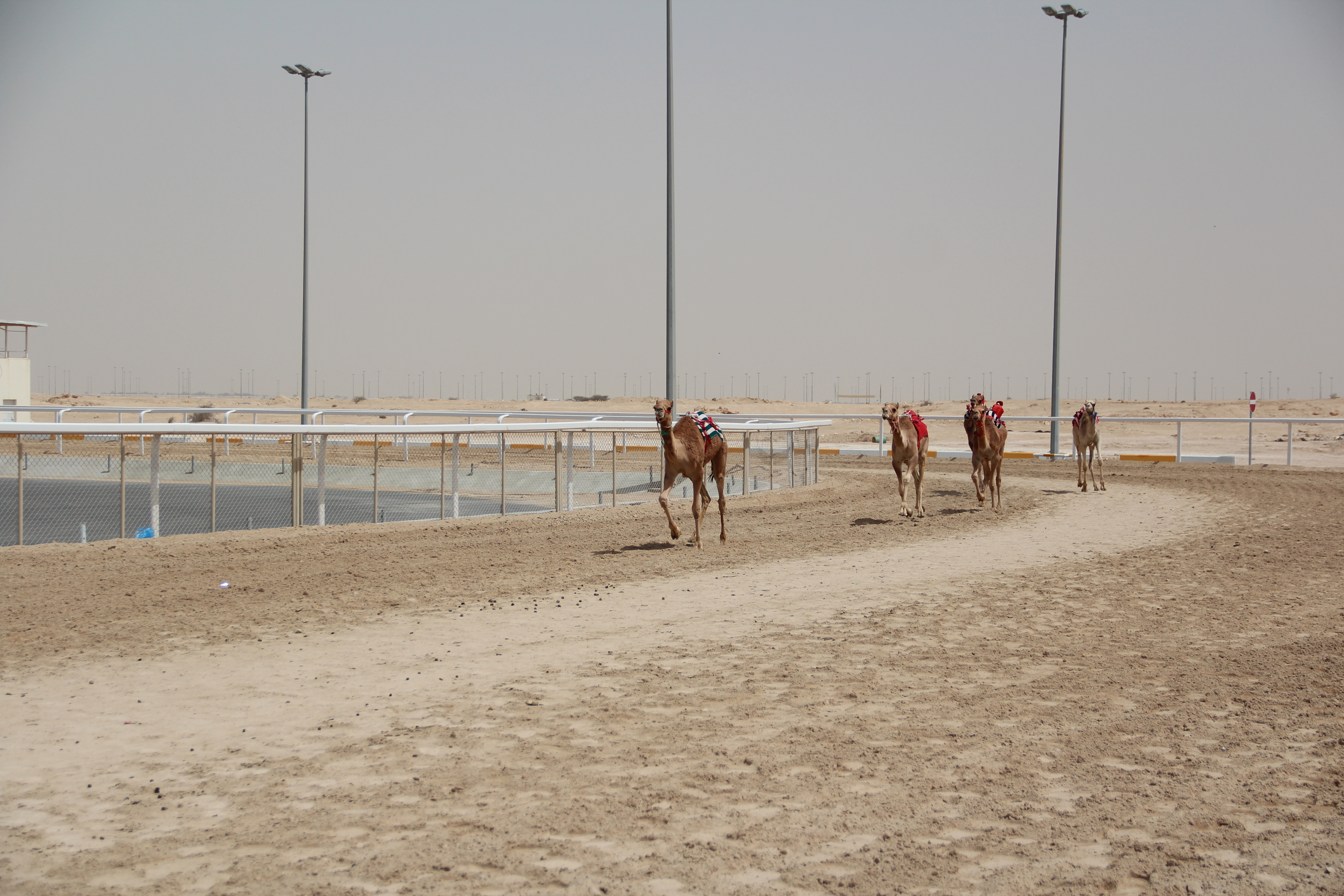
Camels racing down the Al Shahaniya Camel Racetrack

As a competitive sport, camel racing dates back to 1973 when the first camel race was organized in Al-Farra, an area located 9 km west of Al-Shahaniya, featuring 300 camels. Subsequently, new racetracks were inaugurated, such as Al Rayyan Square and Libraqa Square, which hosted races until the late 1980s; these tracks were eventually replaced by the Al-Shahaniya Camel Racetrack in 1990. The two main camel types used for racing in Qatar are Omani camels, known for their robust build and endurance, and the Sudanese camels, known for their speed. Typically, camel racing season takes place from September to March. Approximately 22,000 racing camels are used in competitions which are mainly held at the Al-Shahaniya Camel Racetrack and attended by thousands of spectators. The average distance of such races is usually 4 to 8 km, depending on several factors. The races typically feature large monetary awards for winners, including cars appraised at values upwards of $200,000.

Over the years, the Qatari government organized additional camel racing competitions such as the Grand Annual Festival to showcase camels from Qatar and neighboring Gulf Cooperation Council (GCC) countries. The government has also sponsored efforts to technologically advance the sport as a whole, such as introducing robot jockeys in 2005. These initiatives, as well as increased state regulation, are part of the efforts to modernize camel racing while preserving its cultural significance.

=== Folk games ===
Prior to the introduction of football, children played traditional games, including al dahroi, al sabbah, and taq taq taqiyyah for boys, and al kunatb, al laqfah and nat al habl for girls. Two of the most popular board games were a’ailah and al haluwsah. Damah, a variant of checkers, has had a resurgence in popularity in recent years.

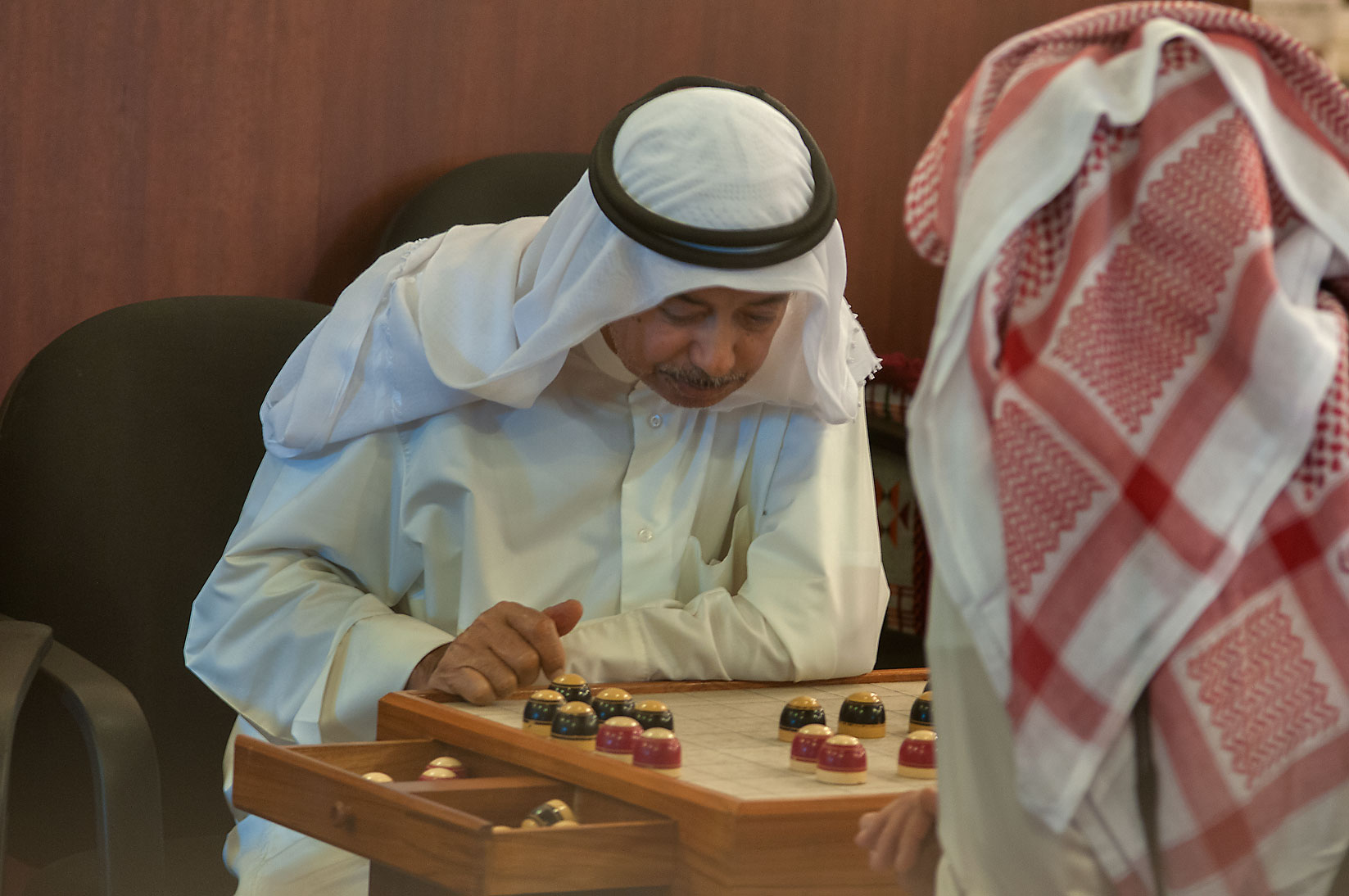
Two men playing the traditional board game of damah in Souq Waqif

Depending on the location, a game could be a sea game or an urban game; furthermore, most games were gender exclusive. Typically, boys' games would be more physical. One such game was called tnumba, in which two teams would attempt to redirect an airborne ball toward the others' hand-dug pit, which served as a goal. Another similar game was called matoua and involved taking turns using a makeshift tennis racket to keep a ball suspended in the air, the winner being who can keep it in the air for the longest time. Farrarah was the name used for a gyroscope, which boys would often compete with each other over the length of time they could keep it spinning for. All of these are categorized as urban games. An example of a sea game, which was less common, was releasing hand-made miniature boats into the water and racing them to a prespecified landmark.

Shakaha was a popular girls' game. It involved two girls prone on the ground, oriented towards each other, with a third girl attempting to pass by jumping over them. As the game progressed, the girls on the ground would become increasingly outstretched, making it more difficult for the third girl to pass. One game shared by both boys and girls was called zlalwah, and involved the person whose turn it is throwing a stone at the shadow of one of the participants, with the game ending once the targeted person chases and catches one of the others.

== See also ==
- Ministry of Culture and Sports (Qatar)
