= Al-ras (drum) =

Unpitched percussion instrument

The Al-Ras drum is a large drum used in the battle dance Ayyala, a folk dance of Oman, Qatar and U.A.E. The Al-ras leads the dance and sets the beat for the smaller Takhamir drums that follow, and is said to be from Ras Al Khaimah, as suggested by the name. There are many different shapes and sizes of drums. The biggest is called R'as (head). The drum is made by Bull skins while the sides of drums are made through Jackfruit.
