= Theatre of Qatar =

Theatre was introduced to Qatar in the mid-20th century, primarily by students who went on to form their own theatrical troupes and production companies throughout the 1970s and 1980s. Most plays are hosted at the Qatar National Theater and the Qatar National Convention Centre.

== History ==
=== Origins of theatre ===
Qatari theatre can trace its origins to the 1950s, when several social and cultural clubs, scout groups, and other organizations were founded and started hosting their own plays. Prior to this, Qatari society's only exposure to the art of theatre was through Western and Arab films smuggled in and broadcast in public places during the 1940s. In 1959, the Taliaa Club Qatar was founded by Ali Khalifa Al-Kuwari and soon emerged as the main group in the theatre scene. The club hosted many political plays, including Saleh Mohammed Al Sulaiti's play Between Past and Present depicting the Israeli–Palestinian conflict, prompting a harsh reaction from Qatari authorities. In 1961, tanks raided the club after Friday prayers, and members were taken to prison. Members were placed in isolation and were restricted from receiving any visitors in prison.

The culture of theatre in Qatar saw a rise when Arab immigrants brought their own cultures into the country. Before public education in the 1950s, playwrights in Qatar sought out foreign inspirations for their plays. Yusuf al-Ani, an Iraqi dramatist, was one of those who impacted the Gulf's theatre culture.

=== First theatrical groups ===
The Folklore Group for Performing Arts was founded in the 1960s as the first unofficial group solely dedicated to theatre, though it would be dissolved soon after. The first official theatre troupe in the country was created in 1972 as the "Qatari Theatrical Troupe", made up of students from the Dar Almualimeen school. It went on to produce its first play the same year.

In 1973, a second troupe was founded as the Al Sadd Theatrical Troupe. Ghanem Al Sulaiti also founded his own amateur theatre troupe that year as The Student Acting Band after being excluded from the Qatar Theatrical Troupe. Masrah Al Adwaa Troupe was founded in 1974, and Hadya Saeed became the first female performer in the country in 1977 when she joined.

It was a common practice for the government to send theatre students and aspiring actors abroad to Arab countries with a rich theatre tradition like Kuwait and Egypt to gain experience and develop their skills, in addition to providing funding to private theatre troupes. Common venues for plays during this period were schools and sports clubs, however, a theatre hall known as Najma Theatre was opened in the 1970s with a capacity for 350 spectators.

Qatar became the first country in the region to celebrate World Theatre Day in 1980. After a period of dissolution, The Folklore Group for Performing Arts re-emerged in 1983. In 1984, a large-scale theatre competition was hosted by the Culture and Arts Department, and a sum of QAR 60,000 was allocated for each director to hire top talents. This was criticized by local actors as it limited the opportunities for homegrown emerging actors in the industry.

By 1986, the first theatrical company had been founded by actor and playwright Ghanem Al Sulaiti with the intent of aiding troupes and actors in producing plays. That same year, he wrote the company's first production, Antar and Abla, which was the first Qatari play to run continuously for an entire month as well as the first to be taped and redistributed on VHS. Two further troupes were created during this period: the Lights Theatrical Troupe and Folk Theatrical Troupe. In 1994, the four troupes were amalgamated into two troupes which were named the Qatari Theatrical Troupe and the Doha Theatrical Troupe.

The oldest English-speaking amateur theatre club in Qatar is The Doha Players. The club was formed in 1954, and created its own venue in 1978, thereby becoming the only amateur theatre club in the country have its own theatre venue at that time.

=== Modern developments ===
School plays were no longer included in the national curriculum after a government decision in 2002. In 2016, the Ministry of Culture established the Theatre Affairs Department to oversee theatrical talents and plays in the country. Furthermore, the department supervises international plays both in and outside of Qatar.

== Venues ==
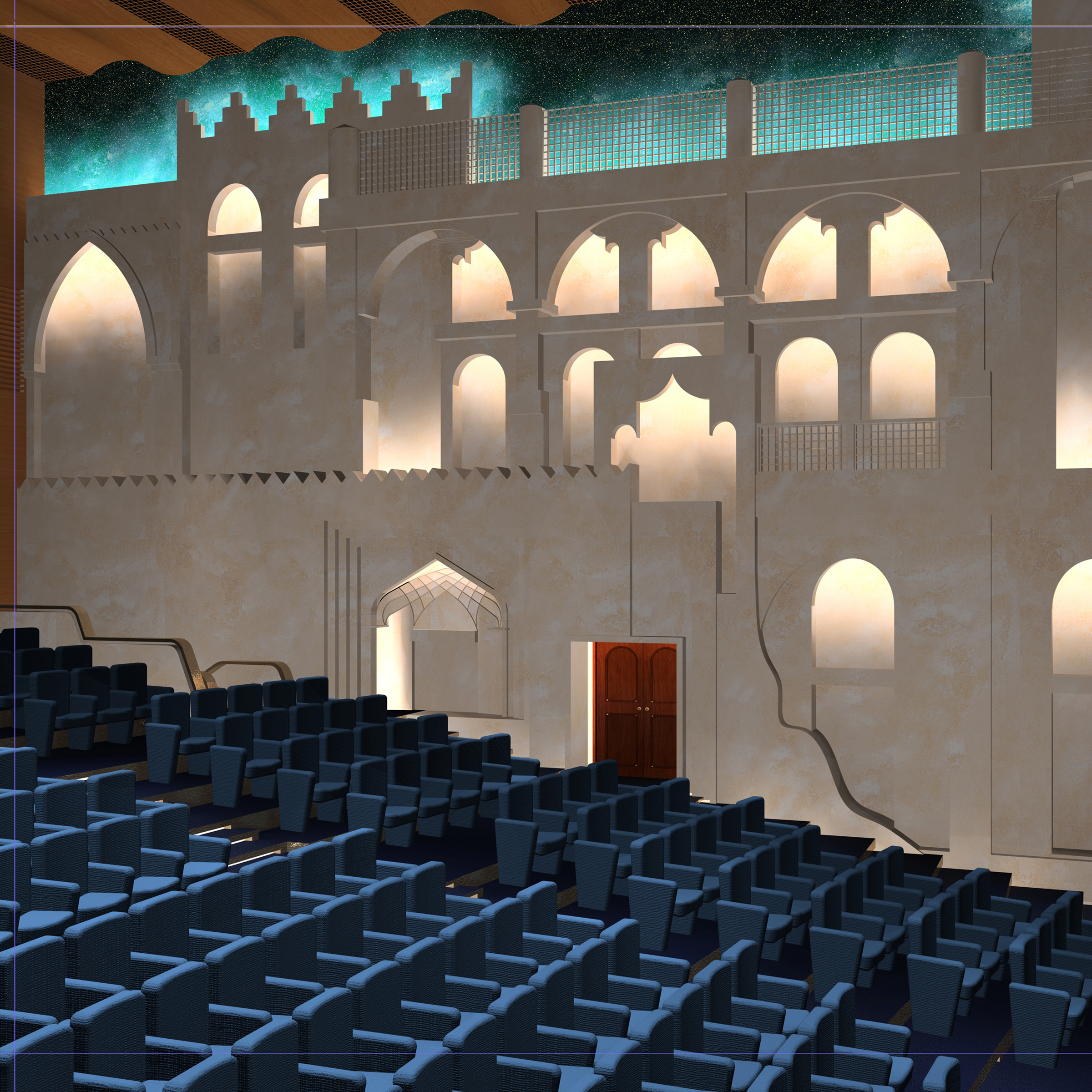
Qatar National Theater

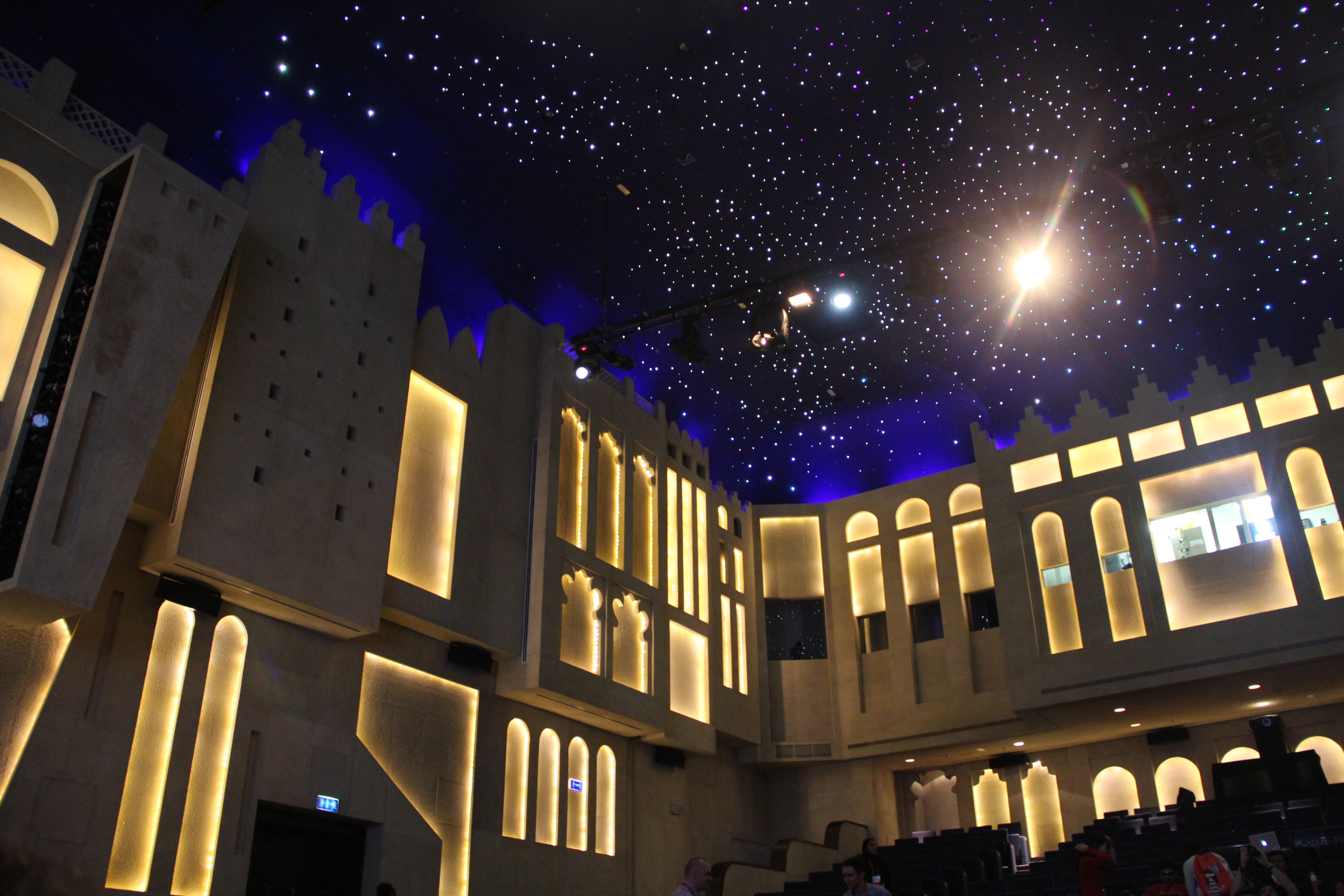
Katara Drama Theatre in Katara Cultural Village

Theatrical performances are held at various venues. The Al Mayassa Theatre housed in the Qatar National Convention Centre accommodates 2,300 seats. Qatar National Theater, which is owned by the Ministry of Culture, Arts and Heritage, came into operation in 1982 and has a seating capacity of 490. There is an indoor theatre with seating for 430 people located in the Katara Cultural Village. Souq Waqif hosts the Abdul Aziz Nasser Theatre (previously the Al Rayyan Theatre), a 980-capacity indoor venue.

== Themes ==
Since the advent of the theatre movement in Qatar, there has been opposition towards non-traditional themes featured in plays. One factor which precipitated disapproval is the prevalence of modern plays which contradict deeply-rooted Islamic values. Another reason, which mainly accounted for opposition in theatre's inaugural years, was the ideological gap between the country's more conservative elderly population and the more liberal youth population which was caused by Qatar's rapid economic development during the mid-20th century. Abdulrahman al-Mannai wrote the first-ever play to address the conflict of values caused by the generational gap, entitled Umm il-Zen, in 1975. One particular example from Umm il-Zen that addressed such conflict of values was a character who presents himself with Western clothing, consequently rejecting his Qatari attire and heritage. His choice causes him to be ridiculed and mocked by members of his society. The play also had themes of conflicts regarding marriage. The story focuses on the titular female character, Umm il-Zen, living in a patriarchal community, and dealing with a marriage being imposed on her.

Themes related to polygamy, marriage, family issues and corruption of children are typically considered taboo. A primary reason for this is because such themes involve the questioning and scrutiny of traditionally-held values. One such example is the 1985 play Ibtisam in the Dock written by Saleh al-Mannai and Adil Saqar. The story concerns a young girl who, after entering in a secret relationship, professes to her father her disillusionment for past traditions and the suitor her family has arranged for her to marry. Another play, Girls Market by Abdullah Ahmed and Asim Tawfiq, also provides social commentary on arranged marriages. It likens the act of offering women to paying suitors to trading goods on the market, hence associating arranged marriage with materialism.

Common themes include the sea and man's relationship with it, particularly within the pearl diving community. This relationship, marked by the conflict between shipowners (nakhuda) and sailors, is portrayed in works like Abdulrahman al-Mannai’s Umm il-Zen (1975) and Night, O Night (1984), and Saleh al-Mannai’s The Little One and the Sea (1984). This theme is evident all throughout the Arab countries in the Persian Gulf.

During the 2017-2021 Qatar diplomatic crisis, wherein a group of GCC countries led by Saudi Arabia, the United Arab Emirates, Bahrain and Egypt severed all ties with Qatar and imposed a blockade on it, playwright Ghanim al-Sulaiti wrote a series of satirical dramatic sketches "mocking the absurdity of the blockade", which he later turned into a theatrical production.

== Notable plays ==
=== Al-Bushiya ===
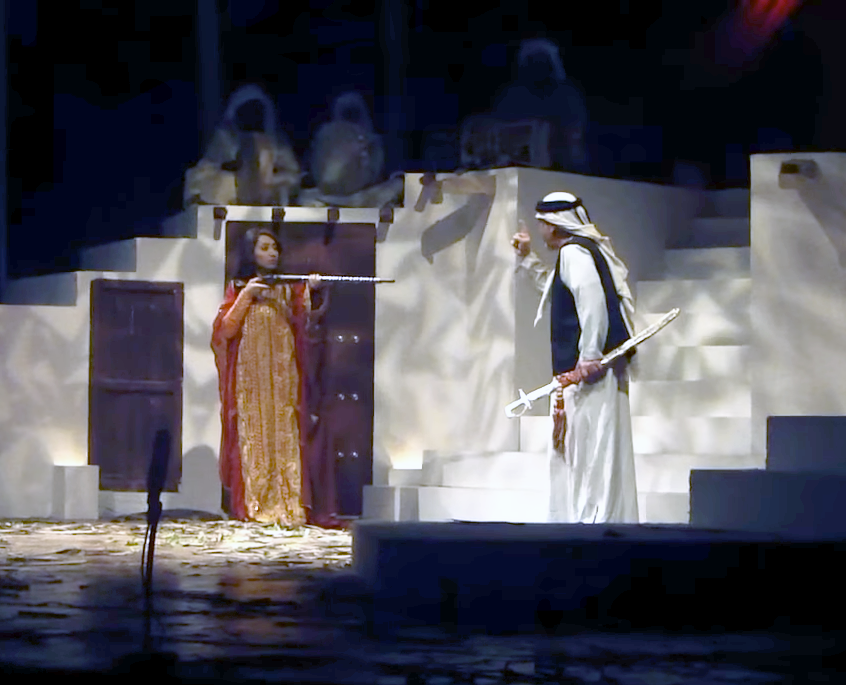
A scene from Al-Bushiya at the 2012 Gulf Theater Festival

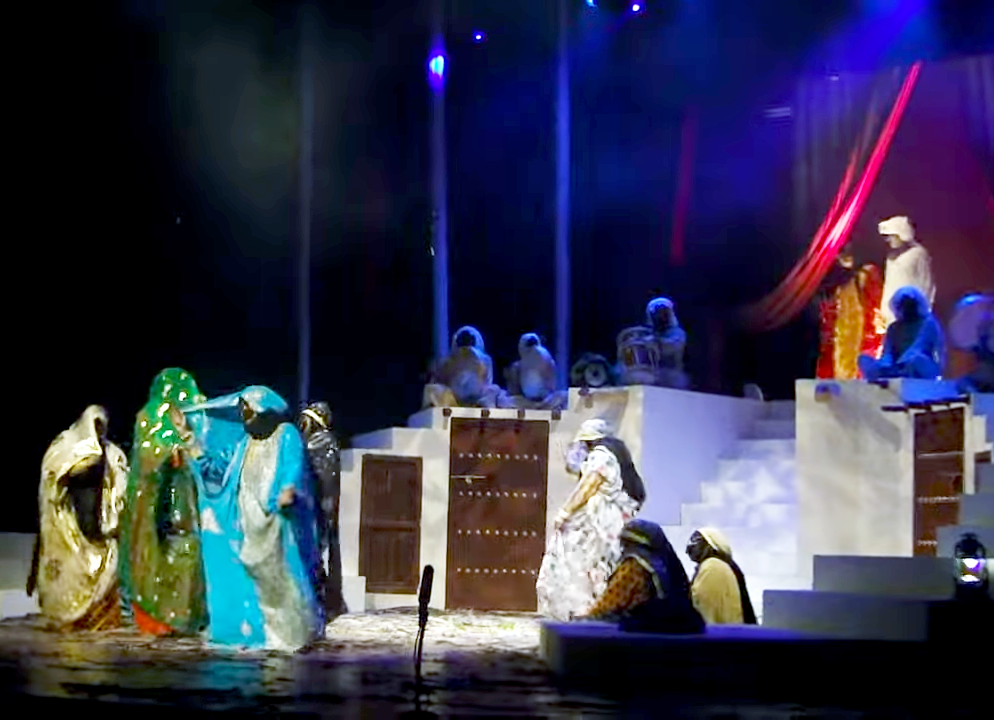
Women in colorful abayas dancing during the play

Set in the Persian Gulf region before the advent of oil, Al-Bushiya (Arabic: البوشيه) is a play based on Qatari folklore with themes of sea life and pearl diving. The story revolves around an emotional relationship between Jawaher, portrayed by Fatima Al Shorouki, and Ghanem, played by Faisal Rashid. Their love faces opposition due to Jawaher's profession as a dancer and Ghanem's weak personality, which is dominated by his father, Hamoud bin Ghanem, portrayed by Nasser al-Moumen. The Qatar Theater Troupe first presented Al-Bushiya at the 2012 Doha Theater Festival, organized by Qatar National Theatre. This production attempted to replicate the troupe's previous success with the play Majarih, which won the Best Work award at the 2010 Doha Theatre Festival and is of a similar theme. The play's name, Al-Bushiya, refers to the bushiya, a face veil used by Arabic women, but in this context, is used to liken the male protagonist's fear of confrontation as hiding under a veil.

Nasser Abdel Reda, with the support of the Ministry of Culture, Arts, and Heritage, directed the play. The play was written by Emirati writer Ismail Abdullah and featured a diverse cast of Qatari performers including Nasser al-Moumen, Faisal Rashid, Fatima al-Shorouki, Fatma Shaddad, and Omar Abu Saqr, with 26 participants overall.

Al-Bushiya dominated the awards at the 2012 Doha Theater Festival, with Nasser Abdul Redha winning the Best Director Award, Emirati playwright Ismail Abdullah winning the Best Script Award, Nasser al-Momen winning the Best Actor in a Leading Role Award, Fatima al-Shorouki winning the Best Actress in a Leading Role Award, Faisal Rashid winning the Best Actor in a Second Role Award. Nasser Abdul Redha also won the Best Lighting Award in addition to an Appreciation Award for musician Fatma Shaddad.

During the play, Fatma Shaddad, who plays the grandmother Umm al-Khair, performed Al-Nahham music, a traditional sea music form typically sung by men during pearling trips. Her participation marked the first time a woman has performed this art on stage in the Persian Gulf, with choreography and music designed by Mohamed al-Sayegh. She was crowned with the Best Second Role award for this performance during the play's second major reprisal at the 2012 Gulf Theater Festival.

The Qatar Theater Troupe presented Al-Bushiya at the 2012 Gulf Theater Festival in Salalah, Oman, in a series of six performances. It was also chosen to represent the country's delegation at the 2013 Arab Theater Festival held in Doha. The play has also been reenacted in other Persian Gulf countries such as the UAE, where the Ras Al Khaimah Troupe presented the play during the 2017 Sharjah Theatre Days festival, and in Kuwait, where it was performed by the Arabian Gulf Theatre Troupe during the Kuwait Theater Festival and Samifi Cultural Festival, and at regional events such as the Gulf Theater Festival.

=== Majarih ===
Majarih is a play critiquing themes of class distinction and societal norms through a romantic narrative about a servant who falls in love with the daughter of a nobleman. The play incorporated traditional Gulf arts such as Fann at-Tanbura and Liwa music into its musical elements. The Qatar Theatre Troupe first presented it at the 11th Gulf Theatre Festival held in Doha in December 2010, as part of Doha's celebration as the Arab Capital of Culture. The play was written by Emirati writer Ismail Abdullah and directed by Nasser Abdul Reda, and among its cast was Ali Mirza (Qatar), Abdullah Ahmed (Qatar), Mohammed al-Sayegh (Qatar), Rashid Saad (Qatar), Fatma Shaddad (Qatar), Abdullah Sweid (Bahrain), Fawzia Al Shurouqi (Bahrain), and Nihad Abdullah (Oman). Generally well-received by critics, the play received praise for its innovative storytelling and incorporation of traditional arts. Critic Hamdi al-Jabri highlighted the play's effective portrayal of deep social issues like racial discrimination and classism, likening the protagonist's bravery and struggle to that of the legendary figures Antarah and Abla. The play won three out of the nine festival awards, along with a special commendation from the jury.

=== Night, Oh, Night ===
Night, Oh, Night, published in 1984 under its Arabic name, Layl, O, Layl, is regarded as a significant contribution to Qatari theater, often considered the masterpiece of its playwright, Abdulrahman al-Mannai. Despite its minor linguistic flaws, the play's dialogue and verbal dynamism stand out. Thematically, the work explores historical contexts with dramatic implications, focusing on the conflict between good and evil and framed within the dynamics of power and oppression. Abu Fallah, the authoritative ship owner (nakhuda), symbolizes injustice and dominance, controlling the destinies of those in his village by restricting travel and economic opportunities, exploiting their labor for personal gain.

The play's dialogue reflects the villagers' resignation to Abu Fallah's tyranny, highlighting their sense of helplessness and economic dependence. This is reinforced by Abu Fallah's forceful abduction of Farha, the waterman's daughter. This action represents the confiscation of freedom and is met with silent acquiescence from the community. The character of Abu Saood, a reforming preacher, challenges Abu Fallah's authority, advocating for resistance against oppression. Another character, Mubarak, has an unprofessed love interest in Farha, and also represents a challenge to Abu Fallah's criminal behavior.

A summary trial orchestrated by Abu Fallah further reveals the villagers' complicity in perpetuating injustice. The play culminates in the burning of Abu Fallah's ships, symbolizing the destruction of instruments of oppression and the triumph of justice over tyranny. In a 1985 opinion poll conducted on Qatari artists by Al Raya on the most important events of 1984, al-Mannai's play was selected as the most important artistic event.

=== The Fighters ===
The Fighters (Arabic: المتراشقون), also translated as The Pelters, was written by Ghanem Al Sulaiti and directed by Ali Mirza in 1985. Written in classical Arabic, the play was presented by Qatar's delegation at the second Carthage Theatre Festival in Tunisia in 1985, where it won two awards: the Best Actor Award, presented to Ghanem al-Sulaiti and the Best Theatrical Art Award, also awarded to Ghanem al-Sulaiti. The play starred Ghanem al-Sulaiti, Ghazi Hussein, Abdulaziz Jassim, Mohammed Abu Jassum, Abdullah Ahmed, Sinan al-Maslamani, Faleh Fayez, Abdullah Ghaifan, Salah al-Mulla, Saleh al-Mannai, Bahraini actress Amina al-Qaffas, Khaled al-Ziyara and Ghanem al-Rumaihi.

The play focuses on the national tragedy of the Arab community, highlighting contradictions and differences that cause conflict both within and between communities. It explores these themes in a comic and sarcastic manner, embedding bitterness and grief to create a reflective atmosphere. The play uses the backdrop of two fictional states, Al-Hibal and Al-Jibbal, each with its own ruler and in a state of continuous conflict with each other, sometimes reaching the point of war.

Characters in the play, such as Dhoa-al-Makan and Ifraidon, embody symbolic roles. Dhoa-al-Makan represents the people's conscience, while Ifraidon, portrayed as coming from the "country of light", serves as a mediator to reconcile the rulers, symbolizing coexistence. Al-Sulaiti's use of documentary theatre is evident as he blends real social issues with artistic expression.

== Operettas ==
Operettas, a light form of theatre focusing more on written dialogue and musical incorporation, have been a popular feature of cultural festivals with theatrical performances. In 2006, in the fifth edition of the Doha Cultural Festival hosted by the National Council for Culture, Arts and Heritage, an operetta about the historic myth of May and Gilan was performed. At the next edition, an operetta entitled Earth and Air was showcased.

=== May and Gilan ===
May and Gilan is a Qatari legend, or hikâya. In Qatari folklore, the tale of May and Ghilân has been celebrated as a foundational myth, often recounted through oral tradition. Ghilân, a prominent figure in Qatar's maritime history, is revered as the progenitor of pearl fishing, the historical mainstay of Qatar's inhabitants. In Khor Al Muhanadah (now Al Khor), Ghilân, a wealthy boat owner, dominates the pearl fishing industry until May, a woman with superior boats and crew, challenges him. When May's rowers outpace Ghilân's vessels, he devises a plan inspired by a grasshopper's wings to create the sail. This innovation allows Ghilân's boats to surpass May's, securing his victory.

Qatari playwright Abdulrahman Al Mannai made a theatrical adaptation of the legend in 2006 at the fifth edition of the Doha Cultural Festival hosted by the National Council for Culture, Arts and Heritage. The play took place at Qatar National Theatre. An operetta featuring traditional sea music and dances, over 120 performers took part in the play, including a Swiss children's dance troupe. Matar Ali and Fouad al-Hariri composed and arranged the musical notes of the operetta, while Faisal al-Tamimi directed the acting performances.

=== Earth and Air ===
Due to the success of al-Mannai's operetta at the 2006 Doha Cultural Festival, the National Council for Culture, Arts, and Heritage reprised a performance at the 6th Doha Cultural Festival in 2007. The operetta, "Earth and Sea", written and directed by Saad Bourshid, premiered at the festival's opening. This work highlights the two cultural pillars of Qatar: the desert and the sea. The plot centers on a country boy who falls in love with a captain's daughter and seeks to marry her. However, the woman's cousin opposes the match and tries to thwart it by telling the suitor that, given her status, the dowry must be substantial. He suggests that the young man retrieve a large pearl from the sea, believing it an impossible task for a farmer unfamiliar with the ocean. The determined young man accepts the challenge, braves the sea's dangers, and successfully retrieves the pearl, proving his worth and resilience.

=== The Story of Qatar ===
The operetta The Story of Qatar was organized in 2018 by the Drama Theatre club at Katara Cultural Village. A sizable audience with a diverse array of backgrounds was stated to have been present at the performance. The 20-segmented musical operetta included the State of Qatar's history throughout the years of its founding. According to the Gulf Times, the operetta received a positive reception from audiences.

=== A Folktale in Love of the Nation ===
The operetta A Folktale in Love of the Nation was performed in December 2021 at Katara Cultural Village, corresponding with the 2021 FIFA Arab Cup hosted in Qatar. Artist Shuail al-Kuwari scripted and directed the operetta, and poet Hessa al-Awadi wrote the music. The 25-minute operetta included a puppet theater and scenes inspired by folk songs. Three musical performances were featured in the operetta.

The first segment encourages girls to play the traditional "rattlesnake" game. The second segment is a conversation between a grandfather and his grandchildren, in which he signifies the importance of playing traditional games over electronic ones, and concludes with a folk song entitled Taq Taq Taqiyya, named after a popular folk game. The third segment emphasizes the importance of sports for children. The performance would conclude with the song Ya Marhaba, written by poet Hussein al-Bakri and composed by Walid Aba al-Qassem, in which the guests from the Arab countries taking part in the tournament are welcomed.

== Bibliography ==
- Qāfūd, Muḥammad ʻAbd al-Raḥīm (2002). Studies in Qatari theatre (PDF). Translated by Tawfik, Sedik Bakr. Doha: National Council for Culture, Arts and Heritage. ISBN 99921-20-82-7. Archived from the original (PDF) on 2015-12-22.
