= Women in Qatar =

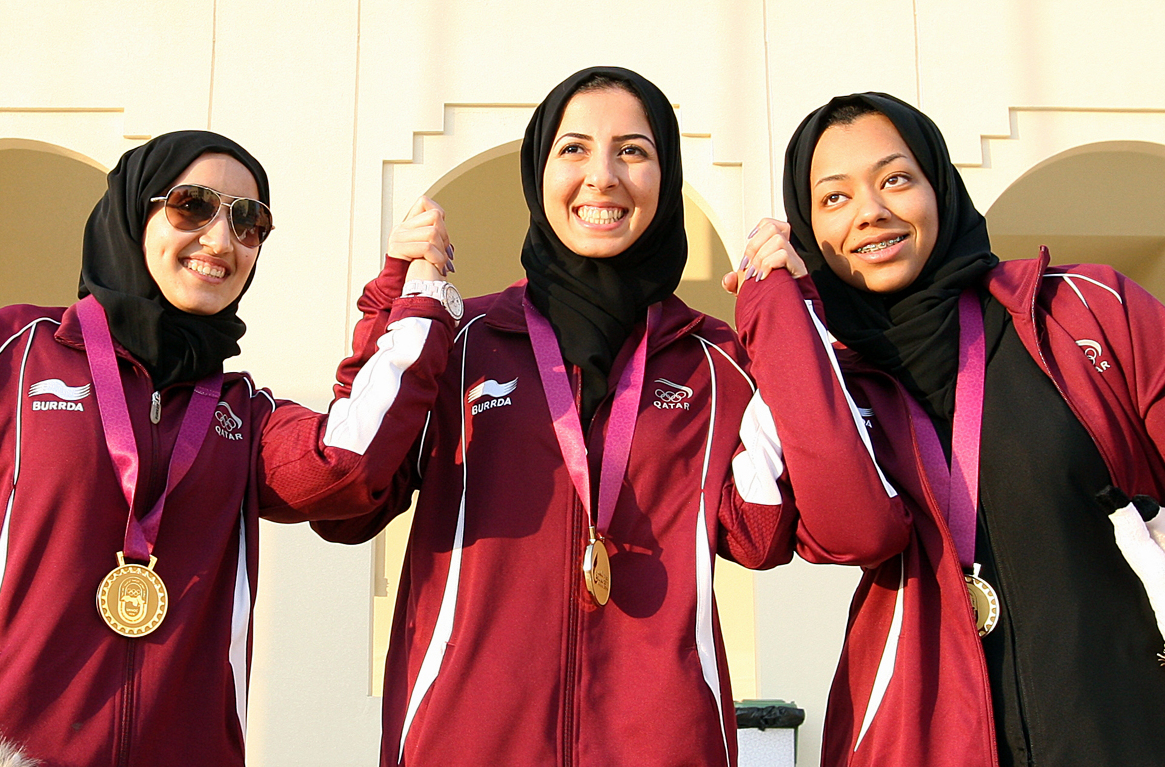
- Shaikha Khalaf Al Mohammed, Mehbubeh Akhlaghi and Bahiya Al-Hamad of the Qatar women's national rifle team celebrate their medals at the 2011 Pan Arab Games

General statistics
- Maternal mortality (per 100,000): 4 (2023)
- Women in parliament: 4.44% (2024)
- Women over 25 with secondary education: 66.7% (2012)
- Women in labour force: 63.31% (2024)

Gender Inequality Index
- Value: 0.220 (2021)
- Rank: 54th out of 191

Global Gender Gap Index
- Value: 0.617 (2022)
- Rank: 137th out of 146

Women in Qatar experience extensive legal and social discrimination under a pervasive male guardianship system. Qatar is the only remaining country in the Gulf region which continues to require male guardianship for women's travel. Women in Qatar were enfranchised at the same time as men. The labour force participation rate of Qatari women is below the world average, but significantly above the average in the Arab World; whereas the participation rate of non-Qatari female residents (who outnumber the former by more than 4 to 1) is significantly above the world average.

There is limited mixing between the sexes, and in public settings Qatari women are largely expected to wear traditional clothing, which typically consists of an abaya and shayla, both of which partially conceal their appearance. Mouza Al Malki, a psychologist, claims that gender separation is influenced more by cultural factors than religious factors. Women in Qatar must obtain permission from their male guardians to marry, to study abroad on government scholarships, to work in many government jobs, to travel abroad until certain ages, to receive some forms of reproductive health care and to act as a child's primary guardian, even when they are divorced and have legal custody. Women in Qatar are also subjected to various traditional practices, including FGM, although this has declined in recent years.

== History ==
Prior to the establishment of an urban society, Qatar was used as rangeland for nomadic tribes from the Najd and al-Hasa regions of Saudi Arabia. In Bedouin society, women were responsible for buying and selling goods on behalf of their tribe. Women often had to assume positions of decision-making within their tribe when men left their families for long stretches of time to participate in pearl hunting trips or to act as merchants.

They were separated from men within their own quarters in the tent or house. Education was regarded as unimportant and scarcely available for the majority of women in Bedouin tradition. On the other hand, children in urban areas were taught the Quran until the age of ten, after which the family would celebrate al khatma, the end of memorizing the Quran.

=== Industrial era ===
After the country began reaping the financial benefits of oil drilling operations in the 1950s and 1960s, an increasing number of women began receiving formal education. Kuwaiti journalist Hidayat Sultan Al Salem wrote of Qatari women's role in 1968:

Hidayat Sultan Al Salem, Papers of a Traveller in the Arabian Gulf: —

"Most women do not go out of their houses except on rare occasions. They go out to the market place once a year. Of course, women are completely secluded from men, they have their own social gatherings and parties. Mixing between the two sexes doesn't exist at all. [...] Radio and newspaper are the women's only link with the outside world."

There was a marked increase of women in the workforce during the early seventies.

== Education ==
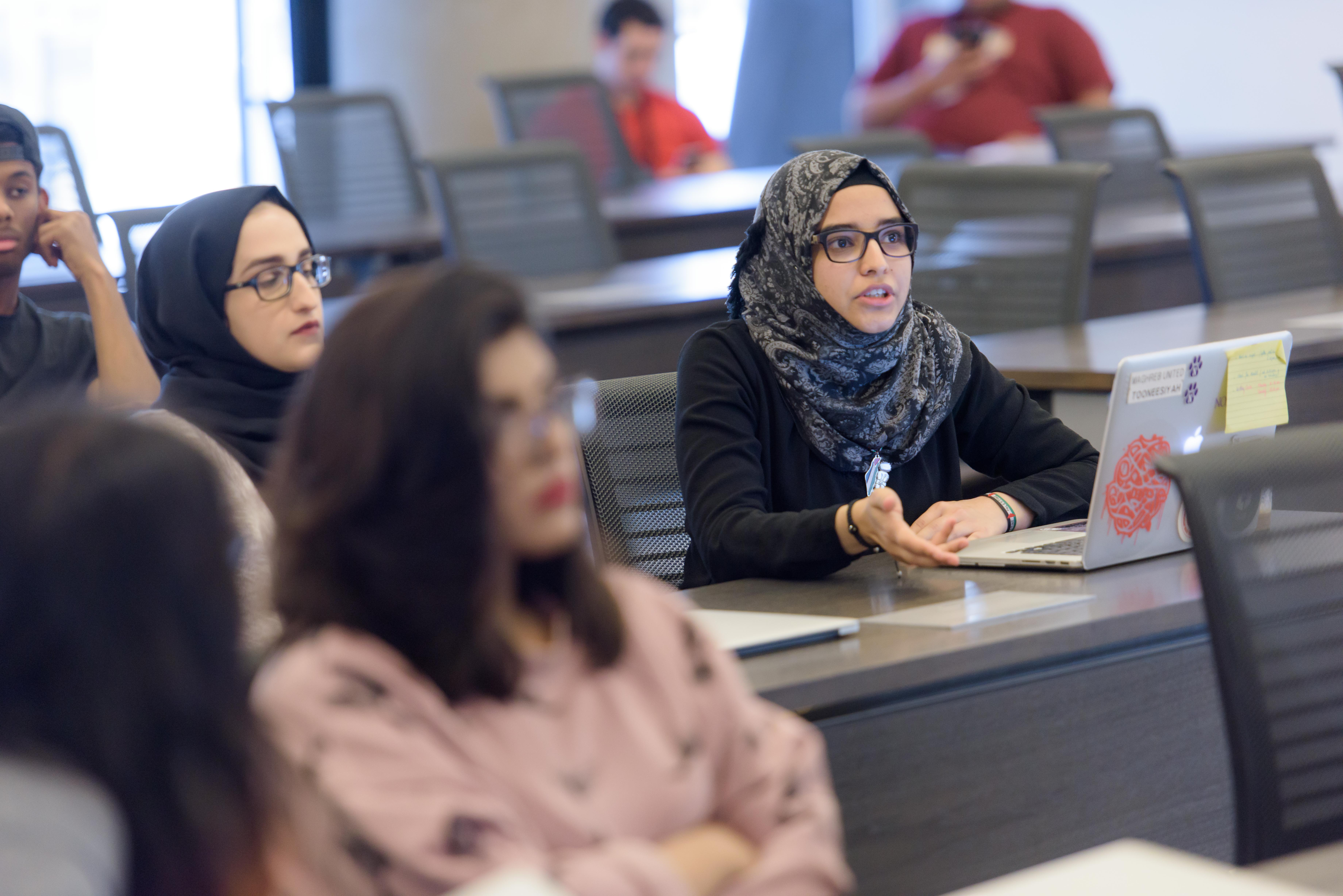
Female students in a class at Northwestern University in Qatar

When the Qatari government established the Khalid Bin El Walid Boys School in 1951, a woman named Amna Mahmoud Al-Jaidah requested that the government open another school for girls. Her request was denied due to Qatari society heavily opposing the idea of girls learning to read and write. Despite the backlash, Amna Mahmoud created her own impromptu school within her house to educate the girls who would attend. In 1953 the Qatari government formally recognized Amna Mahmoud's school, making her the first female Qatari teacher in the first Qatari school for girls.

In 1957 after many changes, Amna Mahmoud's school became known as the Banat Al Doha Primary School and more than 100 female students were attending. Prior to the school's establishment, the only form of education that existed for women was religious education. A 1980–81 report by the Ministry of Education reported that there were 70 girls' schools, with 19,356 students, an increase from 50 female students in 1955.

The first university in Qatar was opened in 1973. It provided separate faculties for both men and women. Out of the 157 initial students, 103 of them were female. The ratio of female-to-male students remained steady over the proceeding years. Sheikha Abdulla Al-Misnad became the first female president of the university in 2003. Females accounted for more than 50% of the university's personnel in 2008. By 2012, there were almost twice as many female students enrolled in the university as there were males.

More than half of the Ministry of Education's employees are female. In 2008 it was reported that the growth rate in the number of female students had surpassed that of males in public schools. Rates of women attending private universities are also growing rapidly. At the Carnegie Mellon University in Qatar, for instance, 57% of students are female. Previously male-dominated career paths such as engineering and information technology have been attracting more female participants in recent years. Roughly 40% of students of the Texas A&M University at Qatar, a university geared towards engineering, are women.

Most Qatari women view female education as important for a variety of reasons. Among the forefront of these is to protect themselves from divorce: many young Qatari women are concerned by the country's rising divorce rate, which has been increasing significantly for numerous years, and by about 70% since 2007. The earning of a degree is often perceived by women to be a method of ensuring that, in the event of a divorce, they'll be able to achieve financial self-reliance. Another reason is the growing female Qatari perception of education as a form of women's empowerment — it's viewed as an opportunity to prove their worth to society and to gain true independence for themselves.

== Employment ==
In 2001, Qatar passed the Civil Service Act and Order No. 13 of the Council of Ministers, thereby creating a legal framework protecting of women's rights in the workforce. Another law was passed in 2002 which allowed women retirement benefits as well as granting monetary benefits to widows.

According to 2023 statistics, approximately 43.5% of Qatari women and 68.4% of non-Qatari (foreign worker) women participate in the labour force, for a total of 63.5% female participation (since the latter outnumber the former by around 4 to 1). For that year, the global average was around 49%, and the average in the Arab World was around 19%. However, both Qatari and non-Qatari women are affected by a wage gap, getting paid 25 to 50 percent less than men. In addition, Qatar greatly partakes in social allowances for men which include amenities such as housing and travel allotments, that female employees are less likely to receive.

Among the largest obstacles to employment are family obligations, a low number of job openings and inadequate proficiency in English. Societal views also negatively influenced the job opportunities for women, as certain conservative segments of the population consider it improper for women to work in the hospitality industry, as hotel workers and as actresses. Nonetheless, the majority of Qataris view female participation in the labor force as being positive.

== Social life ==
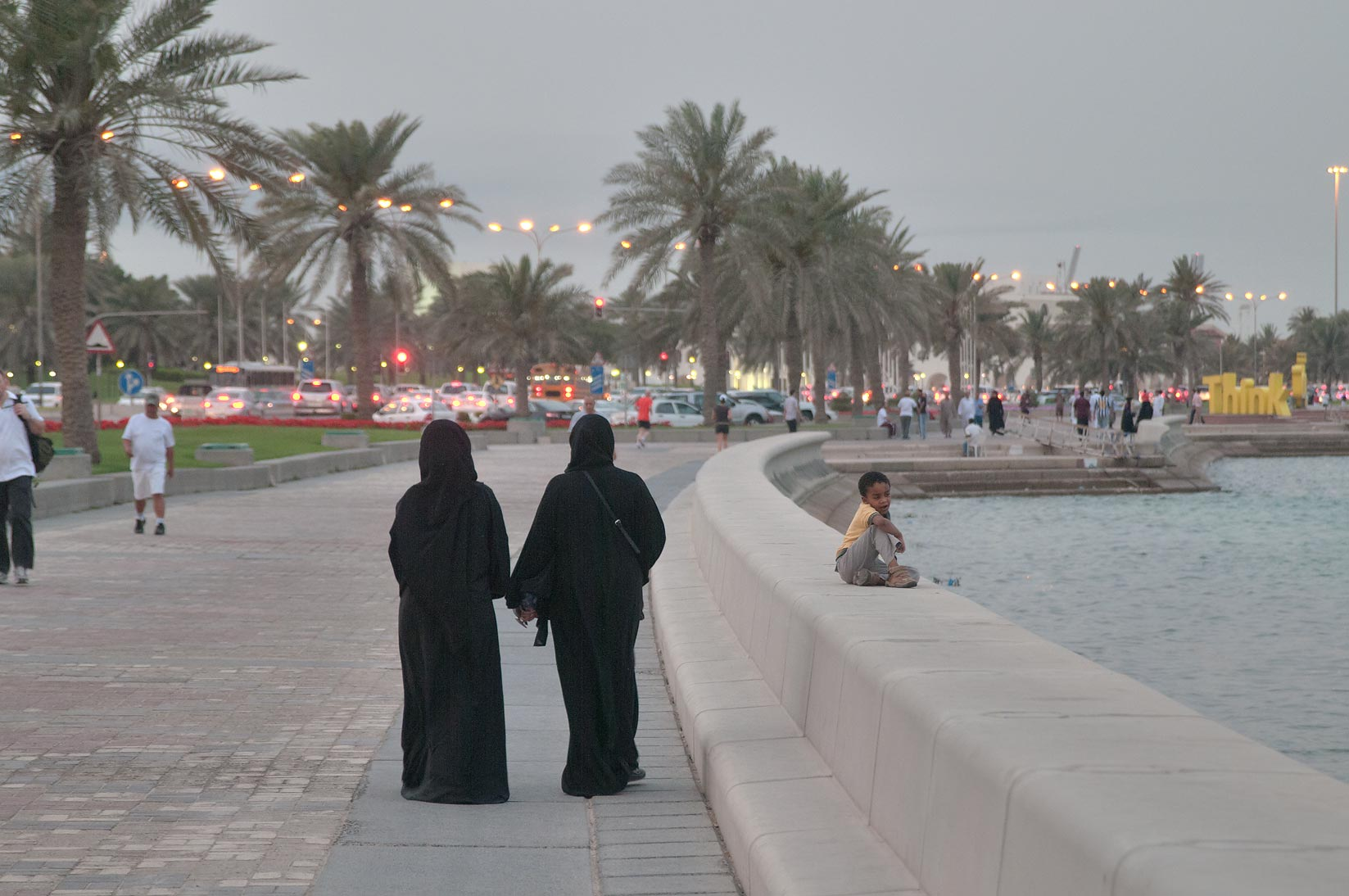
Qatari women dressed in abayas walking on the Doha Corniche

Qatar is an Islamic country with the Salafi version of Sunni Islam as the state-sponsored brand of Islam in the country, making Qatar one of the two Salafi states in the Muslim world, along with Saudi Arabia.

For social gatherings, women are generally never brought to social events except for western-style gatherings or when the attendees are composed of close relatives. Public schools for girls are separate from public schools for boys. In terms of employment opportunities, women are generally employed in government positions, although women are underrepresented in high-level government positions, with only four women being appointed ministers throughout Qatar's history.

=== Travel ===
It has been reported that Qatar is the last remaining Gulf Cooperation Council country that restricts travel for local Qatari women. By law, women under the age of 25 are not allowed to travel without the permission of a male guardian. Human Rights Watch has reported that in 2020 the authorities appeared to have further restricted women's travel, apparently in response to cases of women trying to run away from Qatar. According to the report, officials started stopping women in the airport traveling without a male relative, both under and over 25, and asking them to call their male guardians to prove that they were not "escaping".

=== Access to hotels, venues, and events in Qatar ===
Access to certain venues in Qatar is banned or restricted for Qatari women. Qatari couples must present a marriage certificate before checking into a hotel room, and Qatari women under the age of 30 cannot book a hotel room without a male guardian's permission. Such laws are exclusively imposed on Qatari nationals, while foreign women and couples do not need to abide by them. Music events that serve alcohol sometimes ban women wearing traditional Islamic dress from accessing the venue.

== Politics ==
Women in Qatar vote in municipal elections, and may run for public office. Qatar enfranchised women at the same time as men, in connection with the 1999 elections for a Central Municipal Council. These elections—the first ever in Qatar—were deliberately held on 8 March 1999, International Women’s Day. It was the first GCC country to enfranchise its population in municipal elections.

In 1998, the Women's Affairs Committee was founded as a branch of the Supreme Council for Family Affairs in order to manage the welfare of Qatari women. As well as seeking to uphold women's rights, the committee is to integrate women into society by providing economic assistance and employment opportunities.

=== Government ministers ===
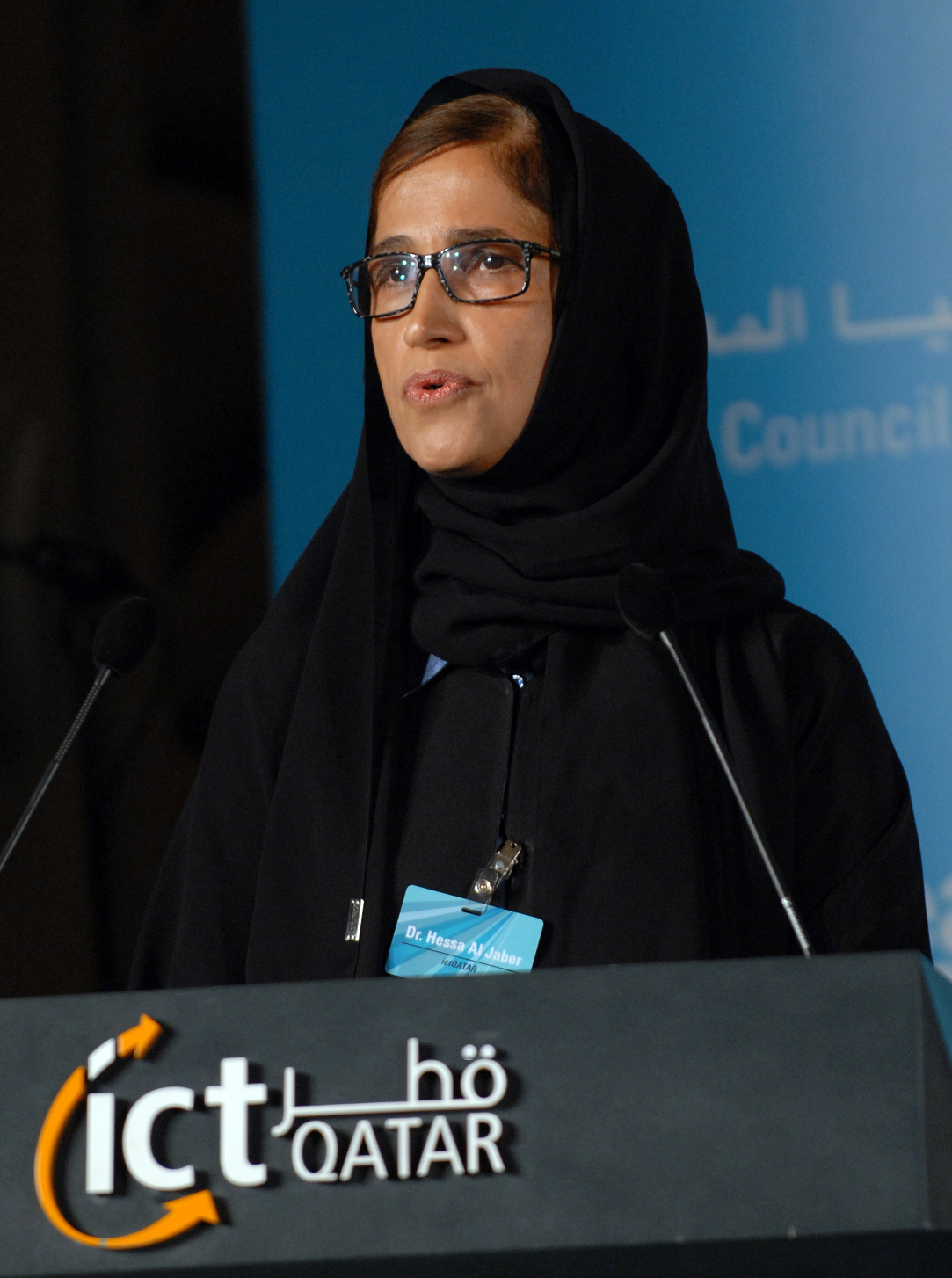
Hessa al-Jaber, the third-ever Qatari woman cabinet member, giving a speech in 2012

Qatar appointed its first female cabinet minister in 2003, when Sheikha Ahmed al-Mahmoud was named as Minister of Education. In 2008, Ghalia bint Mohammed bin Hamad Al Thani was made Minister of Public Health. The third woman government minister was Hessa al-Jaber, who was designated as head of the Ministry of Communication and Technology. Hanan Mohamed al-Kuwari became the fourth female cabinet member in 2016 when she was made Minister of Public Health.

=== Consultative Assembly ===
Members of the Consultative Assembly of Qatar (Majlis ash-Shura) are designated by the Emir of Qatar. In November 2017, Emir Tamim bin Hamad Al Thani appointed four women to the 45-member council, marking the first time women have taken part in the council.

=== Municipal elections ===
The Central Municipal Council elections, inaugurated in 1999, are the only free elections to be held in the country. Twenty-nine constituencies are contested. Both sexes are allowed to vote. In the inaugural 1999 edition, candidate Mouza Al Malki became the first female candidate in the GCC to contest a municipal election. Sheikha Yousuf Hasan Al Jufairi became the first female to hold a municipal position when she won the Central Municipal Council (CMC) elections for the Old Airport constituency in 2003. Two women were simultaneously elected to the CMC for the first time in 2015. Only 5 female candidates ran in the election. This invigorated discussion on the possible establishment of a quota for female candidates. On 13 June 2023, Qatar announced candidacy of 4 women for the Central Municipal Council elections, according to a final list of candidates released by the Ministry of Interior. Along with the announcement, Maryam bint Abdullah al-Attiyah, the chairperson of the National Human Rights Committee, emphasized the upcoming CMC elections for the advancement of infrastructure as well as for allowing all people to have their voices heard in order to influence the future of Qatar's society.

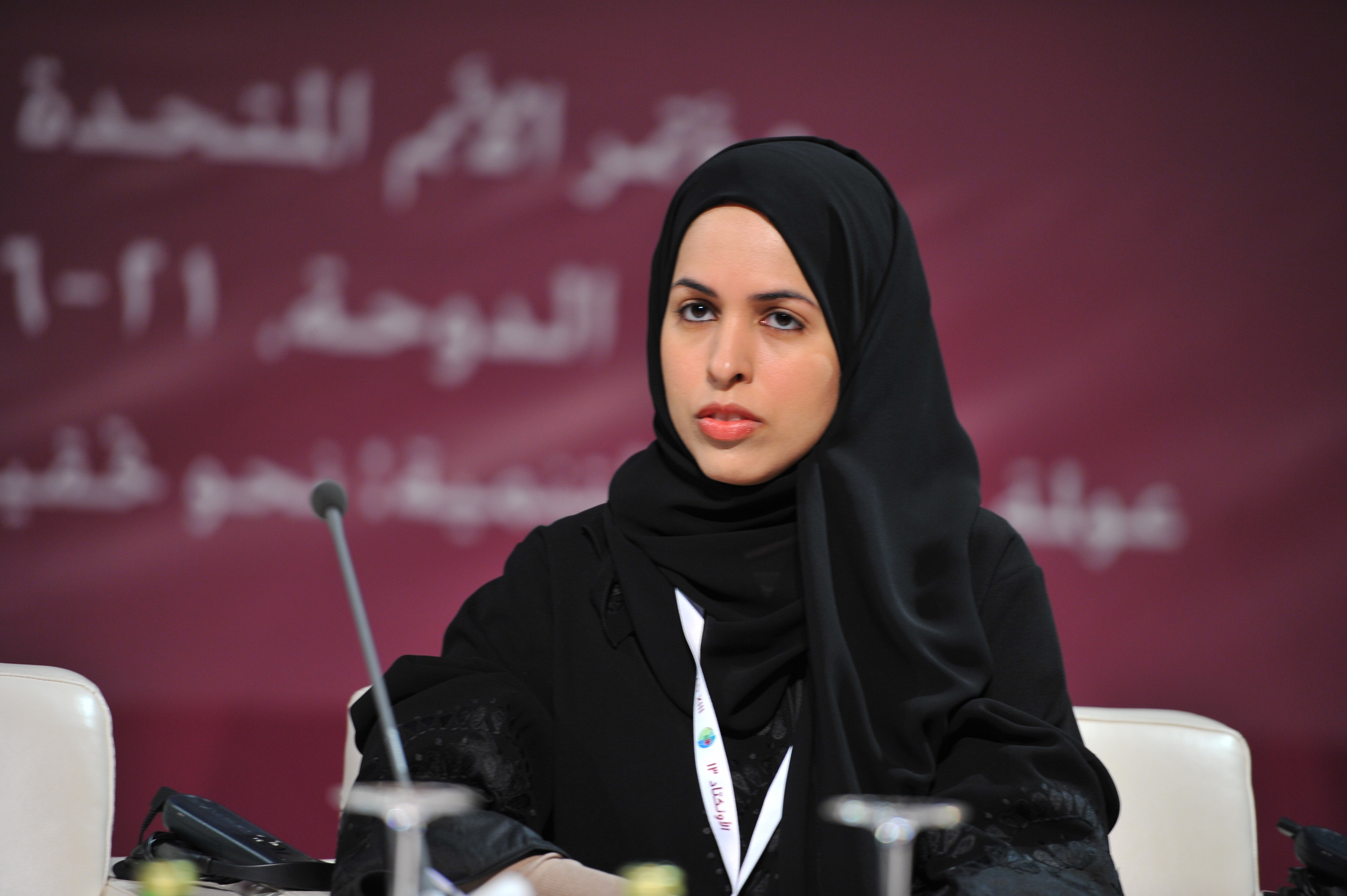
Alya bint Ahmed Al Thani at a United Nations conference

=== Diplomacy ===
Alya bint Ahmed Al Thani became the first female ambassador in 2013 when she was appointed as the Permanent Representative to the UN. Lolwah Al-Khater is the Spokesperson of the Ministry of Foreign Affairs of the State of Qatar since 2017.

== Clothing and attire ==
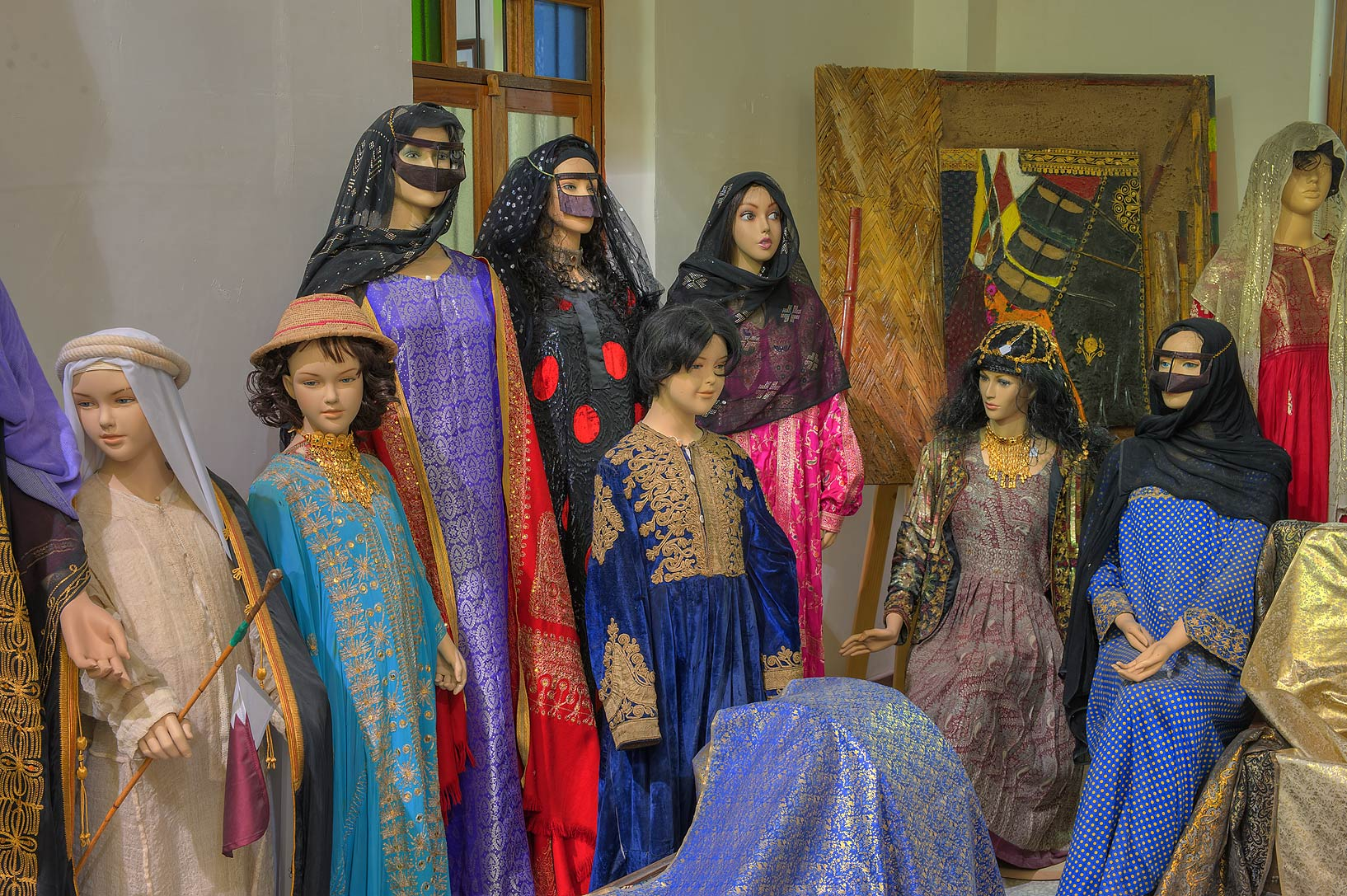
Mannequins in traditional Qatari women's attire at Sheikh Faisal Bin Qassim Al Thani Museum

Women and men are expected to dress in a manner that is modest, but the dress code is generally driven by social customs and is more relaxed in comparison to other nations in the region. Qatari women generally wear customary dresses that include "long black robes" known as abayahs and black head cover "hijab", locally called bo'shiya. Women may also use black scarf used for covering their heads known as the shayla in place of the bo'shiya.

In recent years, the niqāb, a garment which covers the upper body and entire face excluding the eyes, has emerged as the most common way for a woman to shield her face. A burqa, an enveloping outer garment which fully covers the body and the face, is also sometimes worn.

Aside from the abaya, women may wear long dresses with floral designs while at home. In Bedouin society, women wore simple and plain dresses devoid of any designs and usually containing only a limited selection of colors, namely red, black, and indigo. A specific type of dress especially popular among Bedouin women is the daraa. This is a long gown with spacious sleeves. Threads of wool, cotton and apricot were used to embroider this dress.

During celebratory occasions and special events, the colorful and embroidered thawb al-nashal is worn by women. It is generally square in shape, made of silk and has vastly oversized sleeves. It comes in many colors, but vibrant shades of orange, red, green and black are common. Gold and silver zari threads are embroidered into the dress to form what are typically floral or geometric patterns. The daraa may be worn under it. Several other types of luxurious and ornate dresses were used on special occasions, including thawb mufahaha, thawb mujarah and thawb kurar.

=== Jewelry ===
Jewelry, typically gold-adorned, is very commonly used by Qatari women during special occasions such as weddings. Other pieces of jewelry are designed to be used on a daily basis at home. Most jewelry worn by Qatari women are handmade, even after the rise in popularity of more cost-efficient manufactured jewelry.

Earrings are common pieces of jewelry seen, varying in size from 10 cm to several millimeters. A popular practice involves affixing a short chain, called dalayah, to the earring with a pearl or precious gem attached to the bottom of the chain. Necklaces vary in length, with some being waist-length and others extending only to the top of the neck. Some are highly ornamental, having a pearl attached to the chain which is called maarah, while others use only simple beads. Perhaps the most common piece of jewelry is the mdhaed, or fine bracelets. More than one is typically worn, some times numbering to over a dozen. Other types of bracelets exist, the miltafah being two plaited cables, while others consist only of colored beads, with the occasional golden one. Rings are often worn multiple at a time, with a popular trend being to connect four rings, each to be worn on their corresponding finger, together with a chain, which may also be attached to the woman's bracelets, if worn.

== Music ==
Traditional Qatari folk music is primarily centered on pearling. However, as pearling was an activity exclusive to men, women were not included in this form of singing except for when returning pearl ships were sighted. In this case, they would gather around the seashore where they would clap and sing songs on the hardships of pearl diving.

Women mainly sang songs relating to work activities, such as wheat grinding or embroidery. Some songs were of general themes, while others were of specific processes. Public performances by women were practiced only on two annual occasions. The first was al-moradah, which involved women and girls of all social classes gathering in a secluded area in the desert where they would sing and dance in embroidered clothes. This was usually done in the weeks preceding Eid al-Fitr and Eid al-Adha. The practice was abandoned in the 1950s. The second occasion of collective public singing is known as al-ashori, which refers to performances during weddings. It is still practiced by some classes of Qatari society.

The country's first female band was formed in the mid-1980s by Fatma Shaddad. Her band performed at venues throughout Qatar and had its music broadcast on Qatar Radio beginning in 1986.

== Theatre ==
Hadya Saeed became the first Qatari actress in 1977 when she joined Al Adwaa Troupe, the theatrical branch of Qatar's oldest musical ensemble.

Although it is considered taboo to publicly discuss social issues regarding women's rights and their role in Qatari society, theatrical performances have proved to be popular outlets for such discussions. One well-known play commenting on social issues is the 1985 play Ibtisam in the Dock, written by Saleh Al-Mannai and Adil Saqar, which addresses arranged marriage. The story concerns a young girl who, after entering in a secret relationship, professes to her father her disillusionment for past traditions and the suitor her family has arranged for her to marry. Another play, Girls Market by Abdullah Ahmed and Asim Tawfiq, also provides social commentary on arranged marriages. It likens the act of offering women to paying suitors to trading goods on the market, hence associating arranged marriage with materialism.

== Crafts ==
Crafting activities were popular forms of artistic expression in Bedouin society. They also served functional purposes.

=== Weaving and dyeing ===
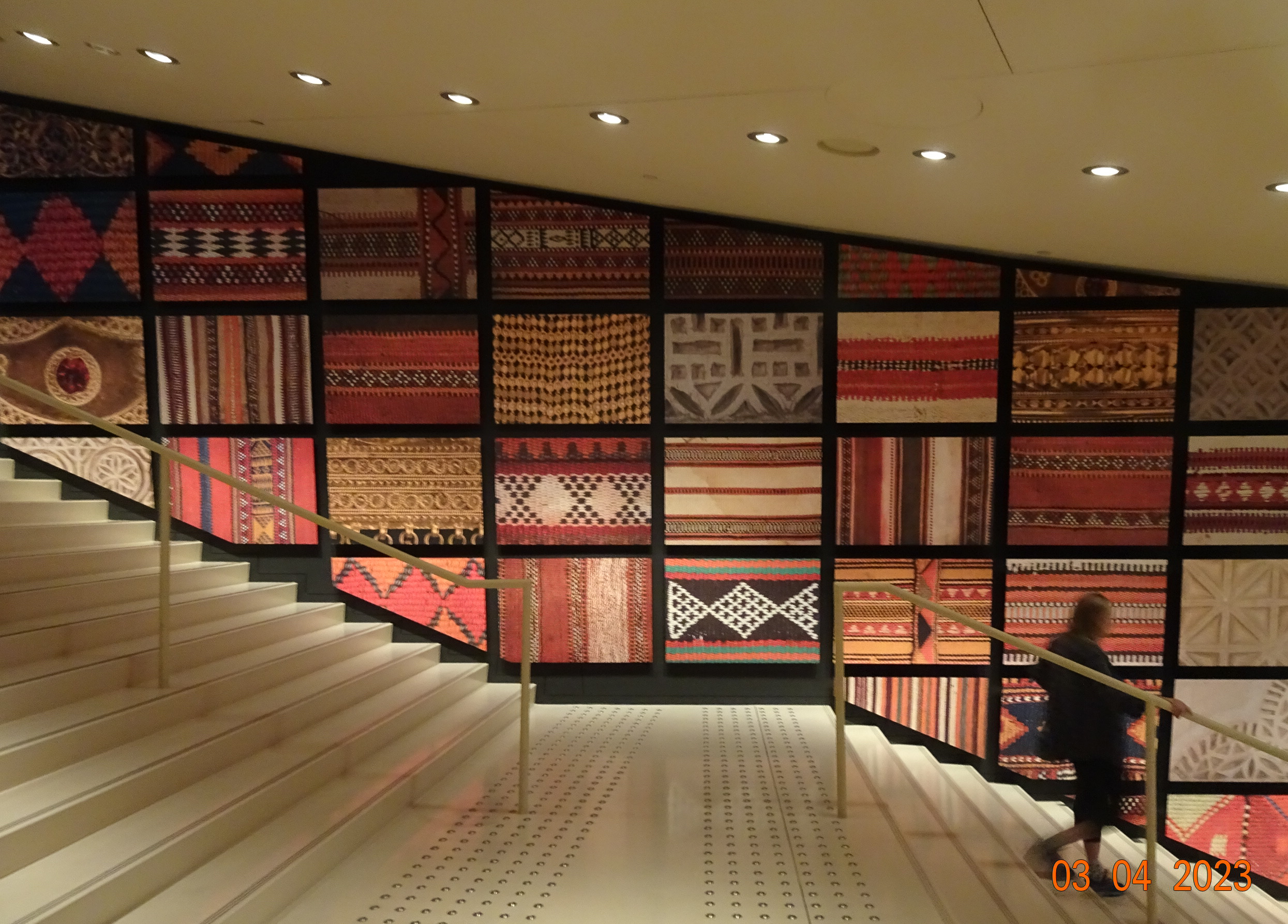
Tapestry patterns on display at the National Museum of Qatar

Weaving and dyeing by women played a substantial role in Bedouin culture. The process of spinning sheep's and camel's wool to produce cloths was laborious. The wool was first disentangled and tied to a bobbin, which would serve as a core and keep the fibers rigid. This was followed by spinning the wool by hand on a spindle known as noul. They were then placed on a vertical loom constructed from wood whereupon women would use a stick to beat the weft into place.

The resulting cloths were used in rugs and carpets and tents. Tents were usually made up of naturally colored cloths, whereas rugs and carpets used dyed cloths; mainly red and yellow. The dyes were fashioned from desert herbs, with simple geometrical designs being employed. The art lost popularity in the 19th century as dyes and cloths were increasingly imported from other regions in Asia.

=== Embroidery ===
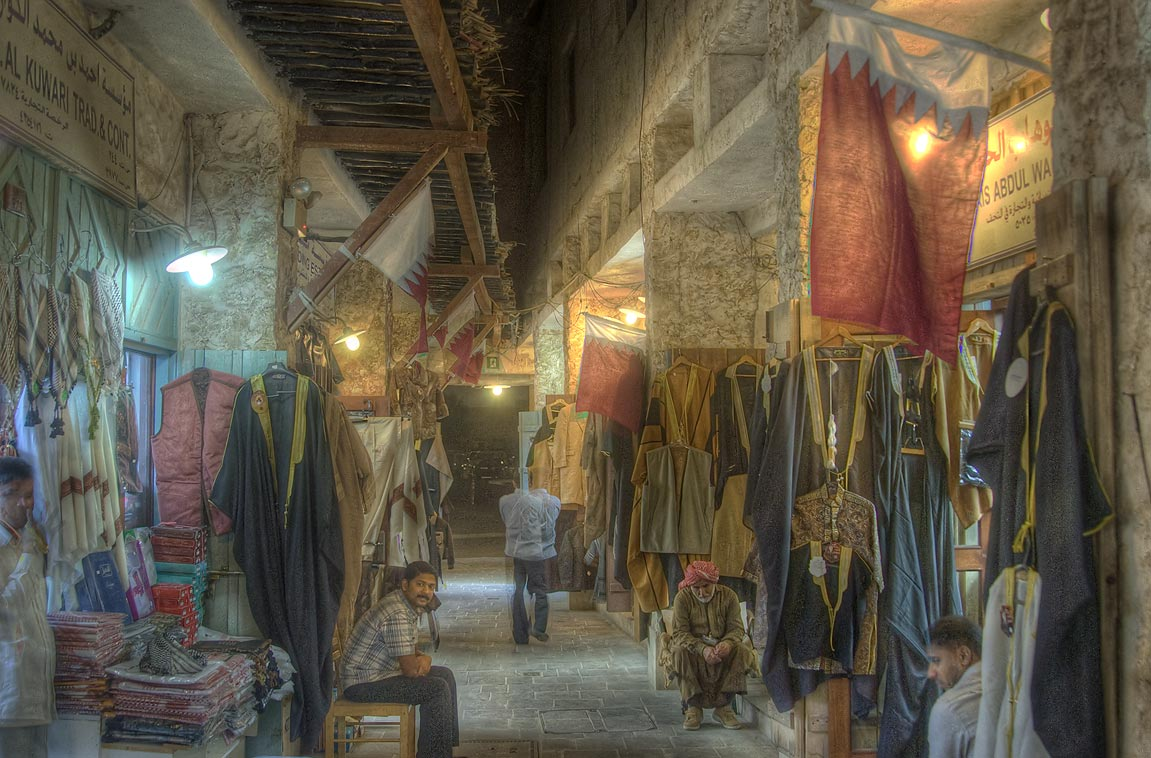
Embroidered dresses on display in Souq Waqif

A simple form of embroidery practiced by Qatari women was known as kurar. It involved four women, each carrying four threads, who would braid the threads on articles of clothing - mainly thawbs or abayas. The braids, varying in color, were sewn vertically. It was similar to heavy chain stitch embroidery. Gold threads, known as zari, were commonly used. They were usually imported from India.

Another type of embroidery involved the designing of caps called gohfiahs. They were made from cotton and were pierced with thorns from palm-trees to allow the women to sew between the holes. This form of embroidery declined in popularity after the country began importing the caps.

Khiyat al madrasa, translated as 'school embroidery', involved the stitching of furnishings by satin stitching. Prior to the stitching process, a shape was drawn onto the fabric by a skilled artist. The most common designs were birds and flowers.

== Sports ==
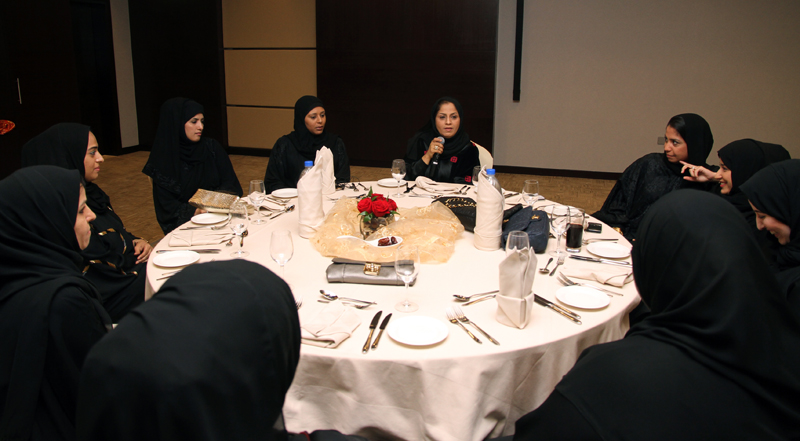
A board meeting of the Qatar Women's Sport Committee

Sports were rarely participated in by women until the 21st century. In 1998, a competition featuring women's athletic events was hosted for the first time in the country by the Qatar Athletics Federation. The competition was sanctioned by the IAAF and was also one of the first major sporting events in Qatar to allow women spectators.

To better integrate women into sports, the Qatar Women's Sport Committee (QWSC) was formed in 2000 as an initiative of Sheikha Moza bint Nasser. The Qatar Olympic Committee accredited the QWSC in 2001. It has the primary aim of achieving gender equality in sport by launching grassroots initiatives.

Until the 2012 Summer Olympics in London, Qatar was one of three countries that had never had a female competitor at the Olympic games. Qatar eventually sent four women, in swimming (Nada Arkaji), athletics (Noor Hussain Al-Malki), table tennis (Aya Majdi) and shooting (Bahiya Al-Hamad). Bahiya al-Hamad was also set to carry the Qatari flag at the opening ceremony, in what she described as a "truly historic moment".

When Qatar was preparing to bid for the 2022 FIFA World Cup, it created a women's national football team, but following some initial activity, as of 2026 it has not played an official match in 12 years. When asked about the team by The New York Times, Qatari officials from various agencies did not reply.

== See also ==
- Qatari Women Association
- Women in Islam
- Women in the Arab world
- Women's rights

== Bibliography ==
- Abu Saud, Abeer (1984). Qatari Women: Past and Present. United Kingdom: Longman Group. ISBN 978-0582783720.
- Who's Who in Qatar 2008 (PDF). Sydney, Australia: Asia Pacific Infoserv. March 2008. ISBN 978-1-921492-08-2. Archived from the original (PDF) on 4 March 2016.
