= Television in Qatar =

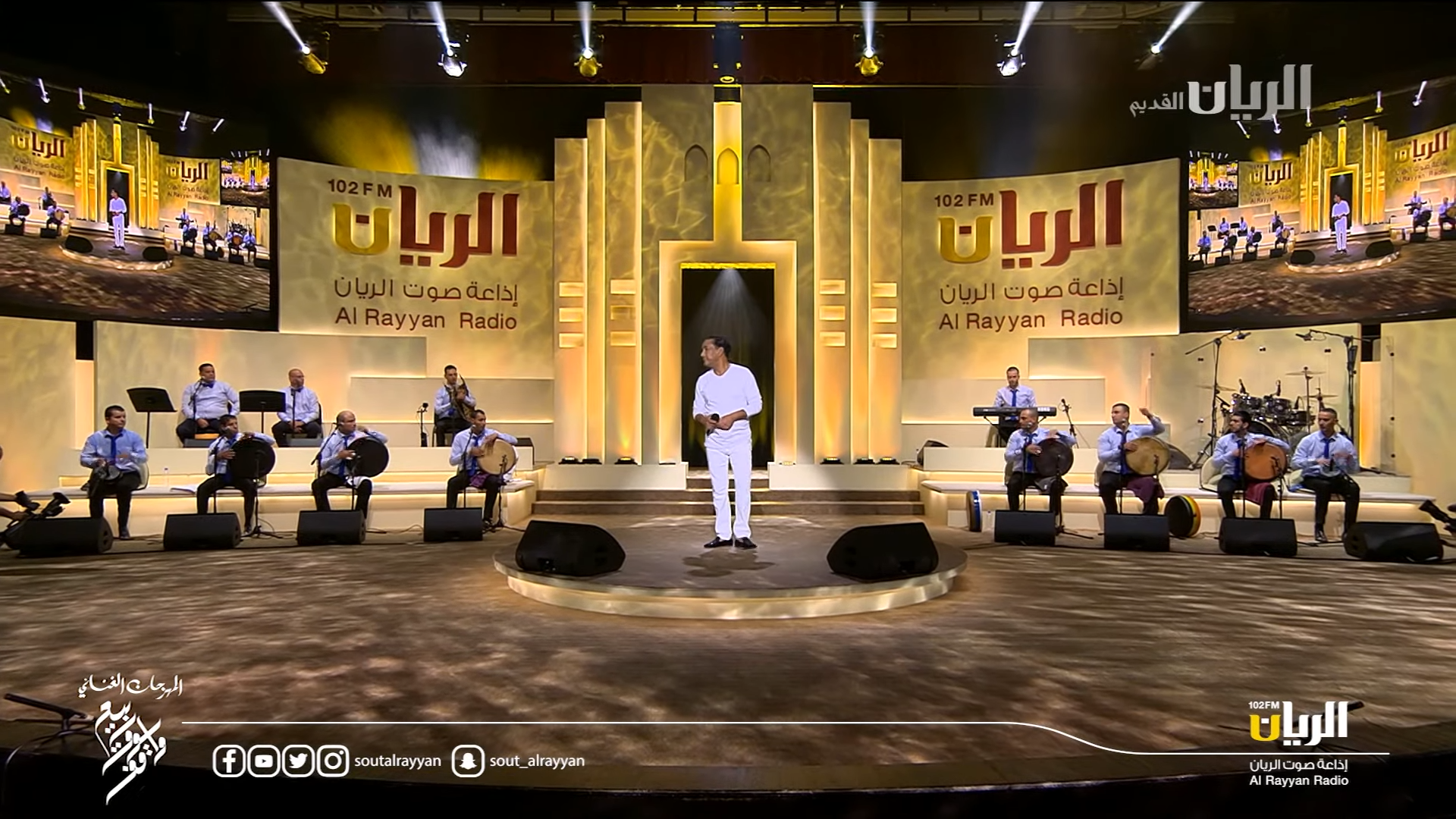
A musical performance broadcast by Alrayyan TV

Television in Qatar is very much state-influenced and operated. State-owned Qatar TV began producing and transmitting its own programmes in 1970, with colour transmission since 1974. It had a monopoly on television audience until 1993, when Qatar Cablevision began broadcasting satellite channels. Since then, four other platforms went on air: ART/1st NET, Orbit, Star Select and Gulf DTH/Showtime. Despite the broadening of television offerings, Qatar TV remains popular among Qataris.

As of 2009, the state owns and operates all broadcast media, and there are only two television networks in the country: Qatar TV and Al Jazeera. Qatar TV broadcasts mostly official news from a pro-government perspective, while Al Jazeera focuses its coverage on international and regional topics.

Penetration of pay-TV is significantly high at close to 83% in 2011. There are 15 free-to-air channels headquartered in Qatar, of which 13 are state-owned. The state-run Qatar General Broadcasting and Television Corporation operates two domestic channels and the Qatar Satellite channel. Most prominent channels include those related to the Al Jazeera Media Network.

== History ==
In the late 1960s, Qatar initiated plans to establish a national television service, later to be known as Qatar TV, under the Ministry of Information. The project involved constructing a central broadcasting station in Doha equipped with modern studios, production equipment, and transmission facilities. Extensive efforts were made to recruit and train Qatari staff in technical, editorial, and production roles, with some sent abroad for specialized training in other Arab and international broadcasting institutions. Trial operations featured pilot productions of news, cultural segments, entertainment programs, and coverage of national events, to prepare for a regular broadcasting schedule.

Qatar TV's inaugural official broadcast, thereby marking the commencement of regular public transmissions, took place at 5 p.m. on 15 August 1970, approximately two years after the launch of Qatar Radio in 1968. It quickly became an established presence in households and government institutions across the country.

The first color transmission from Qatar TV was in 1974. A second channel, known as Studio 4, began transmission in 1981, featuring mainly business-related content. In 1982, Channel 37 was launched by Qatar TV to cater to the English-speaking population of Qatar.

Qatar Media Corporation inaugurated the Qatar 2 Channel in July 2020. The broadcast schedule includes a selection of programs and series from the Qatar Television library, to be aired daily, offering a mix of entertainment, culture, sports, religion, and drama.

== Programming ==
=== Children's programming ===
Children's programming began in 1979 when the first episode of educational program Iftah Ya Simsim, the Arabic-language version of Sesame Street, premiered on Qatar TV. The series was produced by the Joint Program Production Institution of the Gulf Cooperation Council and released in three parts in 1979, 1982, and 1989, respectively. Qatari audiences tuned into the show in large numbers throughout the 1980s and 1990s. During this period, children's programs were aired in the afternoon.

Following Iftah Ya Simsim, viewers watched Qaf, a locally-produced program focused on traffic safety, presenting messages and guidance in a simple, educational format. The next children's series was Jassim's Adventures, produced by Qatar TV in 1985 and filmed in Studio 4. The series starred Ghazi Hussein, Hadya Saeed, Ahmed Mubarak, and Adel Al-Ansari.

The program Hobby Club was hosted by television presenter Fawzi Al-Khamis in the 1980s, and marked the first appearance of news anchor Jassim Abdulaziz. The Hobby Club showcased talents in singing, drawing, and playing musical instruments. The judging panel included artist Ghanem Al Sulaiti, who was then the drama producer at Qatar TV, artist Ali Abdul Sattar, and the Al Jazeera Musical Band.

Throughout the 2000s, Umm Khalaf presented many children's programs on Qatari television channels. She collaborated with Al Jazeera Children's Channel, recording a three-episode series that brought Qatari folk culture to a wider audience. She also contributed to children's programming on Qatar TV, providing educational content about traditional practices and hosting the channel's Fi Al Saha program for 6 months. She hosted the program Suwalif Umm Khalaf on Qatar TV's sister channel Qatar 2, where she narrated Qatari folk stories.
