= Fatima Al Shorouki =

Qatari actress (born 1977)

Fatimah Al Shorouki (Arabic: فاطمة الشروقي; born 20 May 1977) is a Qatari actress best known for her appearance in the 2012 play Al Bushiya, for which she won the Best Actress in a Leading Role Award.

== Radio and television ==
Al Shorouki launched her creative career with presenting radio serials in 2007. Her first radio serial was Tibna Wala Ghadan al-Shar, which was presented with the assistance of director Fadl Nasser Al-Moumen. That same year, she presented Darb al-Mahabba alongside Abdulaziz Jassim and Ghanem Al Sulaiti. She also presented the 2010 radio series Rabi' bila Matar with Huda Hussein and Sahar Hussein.

In 2009, Al Shorouki featured in the Qatari soap opera Hearts For Rent, written by Wedad Al Kuwari, which follows the story of a Qatari family driven from their home in Doha to a tent in Al Khor due to high rent prices. Notably, her appearance in this series marks the first time in history a Qatari actress depicted a maid in television. However, due to disagreements with director Mohammed Al Qaffas, some of her scenes were cut from final production.

She was set to feature in the 2014 Qatari television series Hub Walakin, but was unexpectedly removed from the series after she had already filmed an episode. Initially cast by producer Abdulrahman Al Sulaiti, Al Shorouki's role was secondary, but she accepted it to diversify her acting portfolio. The decision to replace her was made by actor Salah Al Mulla, who was supervising the production due to Al Sulaiti's illness.

Al Shorouki presented Shamma and Taj Al-Sir in 2020 during the month of Ramadan. A children's show with four episodes featuring the use of puppet characters, it contained both advice for limiting the spread of COVID-19 as well as lessons on Islam. The show was well received by the general public, attaining relatively high viewership counts.

== Theatre ==
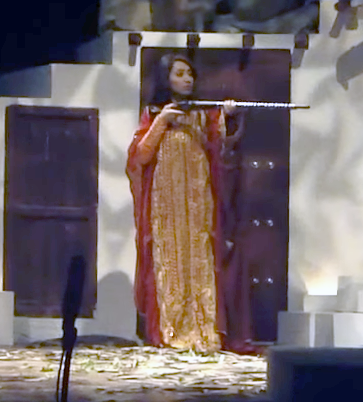
Al Shorouki in her role as Jawher in Al Bushiya (2012)

She would launch her career in theatre in 2008, making her debut in the play Ah after encouragement from the play's director, Ali Al Sharshani. In this role, she would portray a mother who cared for her disabled son. She would also appear in Fahad Al Baker's 2009 play The Nightmare as part of the Qatar National Youth Troupe's delegation at the Youth Theater Days Festival in Kuwait.

However, it was her role in Abdulrahman Al Mannai's play Asfar al-Zubari (2010) that initially earned her significant recognition. The play, taking place in Zubarah, revolves around Al-Zubari Al-Kabeer, an aging fisherman with deteriorating ships who faces the challenge of raising his only daughter, Haila, portrayed by Al Shorouki, after his wife leaves him. Consequently, Al-Zubari abandons his daughter to chase his dreams of embarking on a sea voyage to faraway lands. Several years pass, and Haila, now grown, marries her cousin, who later also leaves for the sea. Alone, Haila rents out rooms in their large house, raises her son, and eventually marries a judge and moves. The play concludes with the son grappling with life's hardships, much like his predecessors. Al Shorouki was lauded for her versatility in portraying multiple stages of her character Haila's life – as a daughter, wife, and mother.

The play Colored Strings (2010), directed by Mounir Al Zoubi and written by Abdulaziz Al Hashash, starred Al Shorouki, who played the supportive friend of the struggling protagonist in a light-hearted and comedic role.

She starred in Al Bushiya (2012), which was presented at the Doha Theatre Festival. The story revolves around an emotional relationship between Jawaher, portrayed by Al-Shorouki, and Ghanem, played by Faisal Rashid. Their love faces opposition due to Jawaher's profession as a dancer and Ghanem's weak personality, which is dominated by his father, Hamoud bin Ghanem, portrayed by Nasser Al-Moumen. The play unfolds with Jawaher's defiant character challenging societal norms. Al-Bushiya received critical acclaim and dominated the awards at the 2012 Doha Theater Festival, with Al Shorouki winning the Best Actress in a Leading Role Award.

In 2023, she featured in Escape, which was presented by the Al Saeed Artistic Production Troupe during the 35th Doha Theatre Festival.
