= 2007 Qatari municipal elections =

Municipal elections were held in Qatar on 1 April 2007 for the third time. Three women and 122 men ran for 29 seats in the Central Municipal Council. About 28,000 citizens of the 174,000 Qataris were able to vote, and overall turnout was 51.1 per cent.

One of the three female candidates, Sheikha Yousuf Hasan Al Jufairi, was elected with the highest number of votes of all 125 candidates. Turnout in her Airport constituency was the lowest in the country at 28 per cent, while turnout in Al Shamaliyya and Shamal was over 80 per cent.
