= Ghazi Hussein =

Qatari actor

Ghazi Hussein Al-Khuzai
- غازي حسين الخزاعي
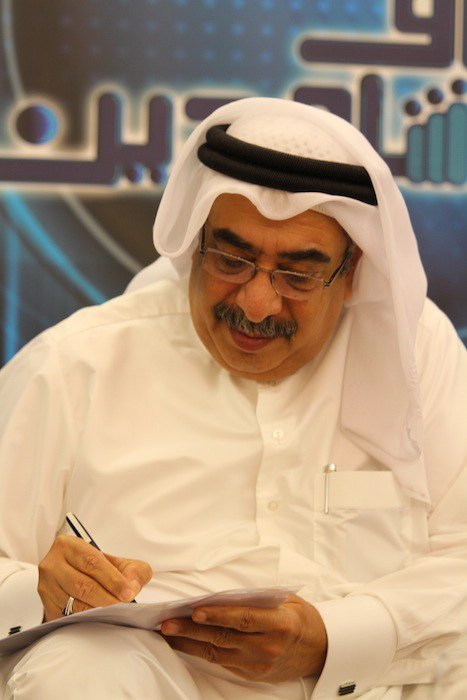
- Ghazi Hussein in 2010
- Born: 21 November 1950 (age 74); Doha, Qatar
- Occupation(s): Actor and journalist
- Years active: 1968–present
- Television: Excuse Me, Father (1994), Iftah Ya Simsim
- Children: 5

Ghazi Hussein (Arabic: غازي حسين; born 21 November 1950 in Doha, Qatar) is a Qatari actor and journalist. He is best known for his work in presenting Iftah Ya Simsim, the Arabic version of American children's television series Sesame Street, and for his leading role in Qatari television series Excuse Me, Father in 1994. He typically plays roles consisting of a domineering and authoritarian male figure.

== Biography ==
Hussein was born on 21 November 1950, in Doha, Qatar. He graduated with a degree from the Beirut Arab University's Arabic Language Department. His career started with Qatar Radio in 1968, where he hosted several programs. He would get involved in theatre in the 1970s, acting in the play Baqi Al Wisea alongside other Qatar National Theatre Troupe members.

In 1984, he played in the Qatari series Noor Eldien Zenky, a biographical about Syrian ruler Nur al-Din Zengi, shot in the Dahshur area of Egypt. He fills the role of Majd Al Din, the brother of Nur al-Din. In an interview with Al Raya in 1985, he stated that his selection for this role reflected his abilities in fencing and horse riding, and that he had prior experience acting in battle scenes.

In 1985, he would take part in Qatar's second locally made children's series, Jassim's Adventures, produced by Qatar TV and filmed in Studio 4. Also in 1985, he acted in Qatari playwright Ghanem Al Sulaiti's play The Fighters, presented at the second Carthage Theatre Festival in Tunisia. The play would go on to win two awards.

The defining moment of his career was his acting in the popular Qatari television series Excuse Me, Father (Afwan Sayidi) beginning in the 1990s. Other series he acted in include The Rule of Humans (Hokm Al Bashar, 2002), The Last Cluster (Akher Al Onqood, 1993), Another Day (Yoam Akher, 2003) and Calm and Storms (Hudu Waeawasif, 2004).

In September 2004, he finished his filming for the Kuwaiti television series The World is a Moment (El Donya Lahza), in which he is cast as Rashid, a cruel and authoritarian father who mistreats his daughters.

Hussein featured in the 2011 series Omar, a historical series co-produced by Qatar TV about Omar ibn al-Khattab. He played the role of Umayya ibn Khalaf, depicted as a villain who opposes Muhammad and the spread of Islam.

== Filmography ==
| Year | Title | Transliteration | Role | Notes |
|---|---|---|---|---|
| 1984 | Noor Eldien Zenky | | Majd Al Din | |
| 1993 | The Last Cluster | Akher Al Onqood | | |
| 1994 | Excuse Me, Father | Afwan Sayidi | | |
| 2002 | The Rule of Humans | Hokm Al Bashar | | |
| 2003 | Another Day | Yoam Akher | | |
| 2004 | Calm and Storms | Hudu Waeawasif | | |
| 2004 | The World is a Moment | El Donya Lahza | Rashid | |
| 2011 | Omar | | Umayya ibn Khalaf | |
