= Wedad Al Kuwari =

Wedad Al Kuwari (Arabic: وداد الكواري; born 21 August 1967) is a Qatari writer who has been called "The Engineer of Gulf Drama" and "Umm Saif". Best known for her work in children's theatre and Qatari television, she has written scripts for numerous plays, television series, and radio programs and authored several books.

== Early life ==
Al Kuwari began her career in writing while she was in high school, writing for several local magazines, including Al Jawhara, Aayam Al Orouba, and Al Aahed. While still in high school, she would go on to join Qatar TV, working closely with the network's script department. She graduated from Beirut Arab University with degrees in Psychology and Philosophy. As a youth, she acted in two plays, The Golden Shoe (1981) and The Chamber (1985), in addition to acting in the 1981 Syrian miniseries Ezz Al Din Al Qassam. However, after these ventures, she decided to reinvest her efforts into screenwriting instead.

== Television ==
In 1987, she wrote the Qatari series Lost.

In 2003, Al Kuwari was involved in a copyright dispute with Kuwaiti screenwriter Fajer Al-Saeed. Al Kuwari claimed that she sold Al-Saeed the rights to the screenplay for a series called Another Day in 2001, but that her delay in producing a series resulted in Al Kuwari repurchasing those rights, which she then awarded to a Qatari institution who produced the series in 2003. However, that year, Al-Saeed released a series titled Al Hareem which bore many similarities to Another Day; notably, both stories centered around four female protagonists striving for independence from men.

Her 2007 social series Yes And No was critically acclaimed, earning her the Best Screenplay Award at the Cairo Arab Media Festival that year.

In 2009, Al Kuwari wrote the Qatari soap opera Hearts for Rent, which follows the story of a Qatari family driven from their home in Doha to a tent in Al Khor due to high rent prices. The series, aired during Ramadan on Qatar TV, proved to be controversial in Qatari society. While the show intended to highlight social issues like modernity's effects and the rental crisis, it faced criticism for being unrealistic and exaggerated. Critics argued that the portrayal did not accurately reflect reality for everyday citizens, noting the generous public subsidies provided by the Qatari government. Despite these critiques, the show earned Al Kuwari the Best Screenplay Award at the Cairo Arab Media Festival in 2009.

Al Kuwari wrote the screenplay for Al Beit Beit Abouna (This House is Our Father's House), a 2013 Kuwaiti soap opera. The storyline, which follows two divorced sisters returning to their father's house, was deemed weak and lacking in coherence by some. Critics pointed out that the script was filled with unnecessary and poorly executed comedic elements, deviating from her previous strong works.

Khademat Al Kawm (The People's Maid), a Kuwaiti series written by Al Kuwari in 2014, revolves around Umm Abdullah, a loving and nurturing mother met with bitterness and resentment by her children. Despite her efforts to maintain family unity and traditional values, her children reject her ways, leading her to leave their home. The series, spanning 30 episodes, critiques modern parenting and societal norms. Other shows she has written include We Are Sorry for This Error (1996), Hokm Al Bashar (2002), and Kasr Al Khawater (2014).

She wrote beIN Media Group's first drama series in 2019 called Ahli Wanasi. The 32-episode series explores themes of family conflict, control, and greed, and highlights the dangers associated with unregulated media.

== Literature ==
She has written for Emirati women's magazine Zahrat Al Khaleej since the 1990s and for Saudi newspaper Al Yaum.

She wrote a book entitled I Declare Love which contains a collection of articles on education and self-learning. It underscores Al Kuwari's strong affinity for reading and demonstrates how her extensive reading has positively impacted various stages of her life. She also wrote a biographical novel about herself entitled I Lived to Tell. Many of her books are oriented towards children, such as The Big House and The Lost One.

== Filmography ==
| Year | Title | Role | Notes |
|---|---|---|---|
| 1987 | Lost | Screenwriter | |
| 1996 | We Are Sorry for This Error | Screenwriter | |
| 2002 | Hokm Al Bashar | Screenwriter | |
| 2003 | Another Day | Screenwriter | |
| 2007 | Yes And No | Screenwriter | |
| 2009 | Hearts for Rent | Screenwriter | |
| 2012 | Khademat El Kawm | Screenwriter | |
| 2013 | Al Beit Beit Abouna | Screenwriter | |
| 2014 | Kasr Al Khawater | Screenwriter | |
| 2019 | Ahli Wanasi | Screenwriter | |
