= Qatar National Unity Front =

National Unity Front
- Part of the Arab Cold War
- Date: April–May 1963
- Location: Qatar
- Goals: Less authority for the ruling family; protection for oil workers; voting rights for citizens and the Arabization of the leadership
- Methods: Strikes; Demonstrations
- Result: Fifty National Unity Front members arrested Thousands emigrate from Qatar; Mass reforms made by Ahmad bin Ali Al Thani

Parties
National Unity Front	Qatari government

Lead figures
Hamad Al Attiya; Abdulla Al Missned	

Number
Approximately 300 members	

Casualties and losses
- 4 civilians killed

The Qatar National Unity Front (Arabic: أمام الوحدة قطر الوطني) was a nationalist labor group formed in Qatar in April 1963. It was established in response to the murder of a protester by a member of the ruling family during a Pan-Arabism demonstration. The movement's establishment took place during a period of popular dissent with the ruling family's extravagant lifestyles, and increasing support of Pan-Arabism.

The group's main demands were centered on decreasing royal privilege; ending employment of foreigners; establishing social welfare facilities; legalizing labor unions and instituting municipal councils composed of at least partly elected members. The group became inactive in May 1963 after the government arrested and detained many of its most prominent members.

== History ==
=== Origins ===
Protests against the ruling family started taking place in the first half of the 1950s. One of the largest protests took place in 1956; it drew 2,000 participants, most of whom were high-ranking Qataris allied with Arab nationalists and dissatisfied oil workers. In a protest in August 1956, the participants waved Egyptian flags and chanted anti-colonialism slogans. In October, protesters tried to sabotage oil pipelines in the Persian Gulf by destroying the pipelines with a bulldozer. Hamad Al Attiya, who went on to co-found the movement, was blamed by the British for spearheading the sabotage.

By 1963, the population of Qatar had grown increasingly discontent with the ruling family's extravagant lifestyle and Sheikh Ahmad bin Ali Al Thani's long absences abroad since he ascended to the throne in 1960.

=== 1963 protests ===
In February 1963, noisy Pan-Arabism protests broke out in Qatar following the overthrow of Abdul-Karim Qasim of Iraq during the February Ramadan Revolution. Most of the protesters were Iraqi or Yemeni, and some carried pictures of Gamal Abdel Nasser and encouraged bystanders to kiss their photographs.

More demonstrations broke out on 18 April. These were organized by Arab nationalists who supported their countries' union with the United Arab Republic. They chanted support for Abdel Nasser and expressed disdain towards Hussein of Jordan, Saud of Saudi Arabia and European colonialism. Some demonstrators held up pictures of Arab leaders and banners supporting oil workers in the Shell Qatar Company. The Emir restricted the demonstrations to the areas encompassing Al Tahrir Stadium, Fereej Al Hitmi, Fereej Al Khulaifat and east Old Airport. Most of the demonstrations on this day took place at football games. The demonstrations ended prematurely after protesters traveling from Al Tahrir Stadium were barred from entering Doha Stadium.

On 19 April, a large demonstration took place during a street festival in Al Rayyan. Several activists, including Hamad Al Attiya, gave speeches calling for labor reforms and advocating patriotism. Yemeni migrants held a separate protest in southern Doha near a petrol station. During the protest, a relative of the ruler of Qatar named Sheikh Abdulrahman bin Mohammed Al Thani was blocked off from the road where the protest was taking place. He ordered them to disperse and make way for his car. The protesters responded by demanding that he move out of their way. Sheikh Abdulrahman then opened fire on the crowd, killing a protester. A petition was circulated for the arrest of Sheikh Abdulrahman, but no action was taken by the government. A few years later, Sheikh Abdulrahman was acquitted of killing a relative, Sheikh Ahmed bin Abdulaziz Al Thani.

=== Beginning of the movement ===
The Qatar National Unity Front was co-founded by Abdullah Al Missned, a wealthy businessman, and a tribal leader and government official named Hamad Al Attiya in response to the 19 April shooting. It soon gained popularity among Arab nationalists, individuals sympathetic to the Ba'ath Party, Qatari workers and low-ranking Al Thani officials. The movement was strongest in the northern city of Al Khor. In retaliation, a small number of high-ranking Al Thani members suggested bombing Al Khor, though this idea was dismissed by leadership. Ibrahim Shahdad, a professor of modern history, suggests that the actual inception date of the National Unity Front was not in April 1963 but in the late fifties, a period when many secret nationalist cells were established.

The group made a statement in which it listed 35 of its demands to the government, most of which entailed less authority for the ruling family; protection for oil workers; voting rights for citizens and the Arabization of the leadership.

While the Saudi monarch was at the ruler's palace on 20 April, a demonstration occurred in front of the building. Police fired and killed three demonstrators, prompting the National Unity Front to organize a general strike on 21 April. The strike lasted around two weeks with most public services affected. Hamad Al Attiya issued a statement on 28 April which proclaimed that the time had come to reform the country's policies and to set up a high-society with justice and equality.

Abdel Nasser sought to capitalize on popular support in Qatar by pressuring the government to send financial aid to Yemen.

=== Uprising and government crackdown ===
The National Unity Front staged a mini-uprising in the central Doha market in response to the government crackdowns in which it reiterated its demands. The government rejected most of these demands, and in early May, around fifty of the most prominent National Unity Front members and sympathizers were arrested and detained without trial. Hamad Al Attiya died in jail in 1966. Nasser Al Missned, a prominent authority figure and the son of Abdullah Al Missned, immigrated to Kuwait after he was released from prison in 1965.

The residents of several towns, with notable concentrations in Al Khor, fled to Kuwait after the group's dissolution. Some members of the group also fled to Lebanon and to the UAE. Around 5,000 people fled in total and 471 oil workers were put out of work as a result of the aftermath of the crackdown.

In May, a coalition of Qatari students in the United Kingdom and the University of Cairo, whose scholarships had been cut as a result of the protests, signed a petition requesting the release of the detainees. The petition received little press coverage. Qatari academic Ali Khalifa Al-Kuwari states that Qatari businessmen pressured the Egyptian government to falsely report on the 1963 uprising to cast the Qatari government in a positive light.

The Emir instituted some reforms in response to the movements. This included the provision of land and loans to poor farmers in 1964. He also agreed to demands of preferential hiring of Qatari citizens and the election of a municipal council.

The government lifted its travel ban over members of the movement in 1972.
