= Hessa Al-Awadi =

Qatari poet and short story writer

- Born: 1956 (age 69–70); Doha, Qatar
- Education: Cairo University; State University of New York
- Occupations: Poet, short story writer

Hessa or Hissa Al-Awadi (born 1956) is a Qatari poet and short story writer.

== Life ==
Born in Doha, Al-Awadi studied radio and television at Cairo University from 1984 to 1985, before studying at the State University of New York. She worked as an editor for Hamad and Sabar magazines. She also worked as head of family programming for Qatar Television, and was an editor for 'Iftah ya simsim' (Sesame Street).

Al Awadi has published several volumes of poetry, and illustrated children's books of poetry and short stories. Her work has appeared in both English and Arabic. Her adult short stories criticise marriage as an institution, viewing it as a vehicle of male control of women's bodies.

In 2021 she wrote lyrics for an operetta, 'A Folktale in Love of the Nation, directed by artist Shuail al-Kuwari.

== Works ==
=== Poetry ===
- Kalimat al-lahn al-awwal [Words of the First Melody]. Doha: Ministry of Information, Department of Culture and Arts, 1988
- Milad. Qatar, 1998.

=== Short stories ===
- Euyun La Taerif Alghufran. Beirut: Hassan Modern Library, 2012.

=== Children's books ===
- Unshudati 1 [My Anthem 1]. 1983.
- Unshudati 2 [My Anthem 2]. Qatar: Qatar National Press, 1987.
- al-Shams la ghazal na'ima [The Sun is Still Sleeping]. 1995.
- Hawl ma'idat al-ahlam [Around the Table of Dreams]. Beirut: Dar al-'Awda, 1996.
- Fi daw' al-qamar [In the Moonlight] 1996.
- Nura wa rasa al-hinna [Nura and the Henna Drawing]. Beirut: Dar-'Awda, 1996.
- Yasamin. Yasamin. 1996.
- al-Ghazala li-man? [Who Owns the Gazelle?]. 1997.
- Lulu yanhad min jaded [Lulu Rises Up Again]. 1998.
- Sani'at al-ahlam [The Maker of Dreams]. 1998.
- Dar Al- Moualef. 2005
- 6 Qisas Lilaitfali / 6 children's stories. Arabic-English with dictionary. Translated by Maya Salman. Beirut: Dār al-muʼalif, 2005.
- [The Day of Khatma: Stories from the Old House]. Qatar Museums/ National Museum of Qatar, 2013.
