= Taliaa Club Qatar =

Qatari cultural club

Taliaa Club Qatar (Arabic: قطر الطليعة نادي), is a Qatari cultural club that was founded in 1959 with the goals of the club based on foundations and principles of a sports club, but with more of a focus on intellectual expression and renaissance.

The idea for this club initially emerged in 1952, when Khalifa Khalid Al Suwaidi, Mubarak Saeed Ali, Saleh Mohammed al-Sulaiti, Khalifa Al-Kuwari, Hamad al-Hamidi, Ahmed Abdullah al-Khal, Abdul Latif al-Jaber, Khalid al-Raban, Ahmed al- Marfiat, and a number of their friends, inspired by the success of the Egyptian Revolution of 1952 and the revolutionary tide at the time, would meet frequently for discussions of that nature. Though they claimed themselves to be a cultural club, the group acted more as a political club or party.

In 1958, the group decided to collect monthly contributions in order to secure a meeting location for the club. Among these initial donors, was club member, Khalid bin Mohammed al-Rabban, currently the Deputy Chairman of Al-Raban Holding Group and the chairman and managing director of Qatar Primary Materials Company (QPMC). In 1959, the group decided that they wanted to create an official club of young Muslims and extended membership to classmates and colleagues in order to create a space for social and religious dialogue between members. That same year the club was founded after the members drafted a statute for the club, created a provision of material resources and contributions, and created a focus for membership development using a preliminary list of names for potential candidates from the Arab Bank.

In 1960, the club struggled to find a meeting place but was able to create a board of directors, as voted upon by the general assembly. The board consisted of Khalifa Al-Kuwari as president, Khalid al-Raban as vice president, Mohammed Youssef al-Ali as secretary, Mubarak Rashid al-Hitmi as treasurer, Ahmed Abdullah al-Khal as secretary of cultural activity, Nasser Ahmed the second as secretary of social activity, and Ahmed Abdullah al-Maliki as a sitting board member.

The club’s mission statement was centered on ethics, work, and dedication with the goal of raising cultural levels and social awareness among youth. The club stated in its document of statutes that it would interfere in religious and political matters.

Club activity was focused on the club magazine, which was published monthly, and trips throughout Qatar to visit cultural landmarks, lectures, debates, poetry readings, and the club theater on topics or issues of choice. Most controversial of these were the theater and the poetry readings. After putting on a provocative political play written by Saleh Mohammed al-Sulaiti, portraying the Arabs in Palestine in a violent struggle, authorities took notice of the club's movements that inspired the use of violence. The club also published a photo of a missile. The final straw for authorities came shortly after the club put on a debate between Ahmed al-Tager and Hassan Ali Abdullah Youssef in late 1960 regarding the political struggle between nationalists and leftists in Iraq during the reign of Abd al-Karim Qasim.

In 1961, tanks raided the club after Friday prayers, and members were taken to prison. Members were placed in isolation and were restricted from receiving any visitors in prison. Among those arrested were Khalid bin Mohammad al-Rabban, Mohammed al-Ali, and Khalifa Al-Kuwari. They spent 21 days in prison, and decided to go on a hunger strike. After the intervention of a few relatives of the members, they were released from prison. Some members who were imprisoned referred to those who assisted in their release as servants of God.
