= Ali Khalifa Al-Kuwari =

Qatari democracy activist

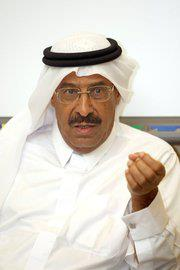
- Born: January 1, 1941 (age 85); Doha, Qatar
- Occupations: Democracy activist, author, journalist, professor, economist
- Notable work: The People Want Reform in Qatar, Too (2012)

Ali Khalifa Al-Kuwari (Arabic: علي خليفة الكواري; born in 1941) is a Qatari democracy activist, author and professor. He has occupied several positions in the oil sector. He is known for editing the book The People Want Reform in Qatar Too, which was subsequently banned in Qatar due to its critical views of government policies. He is one of the primary advocates for political reform in the country.

== Education ==
He obtained a BA in business administration from Damascus University in 1966 and received a PhD in philosophy from Durham University in 1974.

== Career ==
Al-Kuwari started his career in Qatar's oil and gas industry, where he served as vice chairman of Qatar Liquefied Gas Company and the National Company for Petroleum Products. He also served as chairman of the Qatar–United Kingdom Joint Committee for Economic Cooperation. In 1959, he was involved in the founding of Taliaa Club Qatar, a self-titled cultural club which often held political discussions. The club's headquarters was raided by tanks and its members imprisoned in 1961.

From 1975 to 1982, he worked as an economics professor at Qatar University. He co-founded the project Democracy Studies in the Arab Countries in 1991 with Raghid Al-Solh.

He has published research on the 1963 Qatari nationalist movement. He traces this movement as the origin of opposition to government policies and demands for reform in the country. He is the host of a monthly meeting, known as The Monday Meetings, in which Qatari citizens debate issues related to reform.

In an interview with Heinrich Böll Stiftung Middle East, he commented on the demographic imbalance between foreigners and citizens in Qatar, claiming that rulers benefit from this imbalance. He goes on to state the imbalance could "uproot Qatari society, erase its identity and culture, take its mother tongue, Arabic, out of circulation".

=== The People Want Reform in Qatar, Too ===
In 2012, he published the book The People Want Reform in Qatar Too after successive year-long talks with 60 other Qatari writers, who formed the "Qataris for Reform" group. In it, the authors criticize the country's unpredictable economic policy and lack of transparency. They also address topics such as education, over-reliance on the United States, and the declining use of Arabic language in administration and education. The book refrained from criticizing the Qatari royal family, however.

In the book's introduction, Al-Kuwari highlights four primary obstacles to reform: the lack of availability to information related to public affairs; the lack of transparency in decision-making; the absence of free and independent civil society; and the unclear boundaries between the public and private sectors, in addition to sub-par administration of these sectors. Furthermore, the book proposes alterations to the country's administration and describes ways in which the changes could be implemented.

Though local authorities permitted the book's publication, Al-Kuwari's blog was censored and the book was banned in Qatar.

He has previously authored numerous works in which he criticizes the lack of democracy in Arab countries.
