= Hadya Saeed =

Hadya Saeed (Arabic: هدية سعيد; born 23 March 1960) is a Qatari actress who is best known for being the first professional actress from the State of Qatar.

== Biography ==
Saeed started her acting career in 1977 while still in school, joining the Al Adwaa Troupe and thus becoming the first Qatari actress. As her traditional family disapproved of her career choice, she attempted to conceal it from them. However, they discovered her secret, and while she was in the middle of performing a play, her brother stormed on stage and physically assaulted her, dragging her out of the theatre hall by her hair. She continued to act, but took extra precautions to hide her activities from her family. When she got married, she stipulated that her husband allow her to pursue her acting career freely, to which he obliged. She eventually mended ties with her family, including her brother, stating in a 2023 interview that her family was now proud of her work.

She earned recognition for her role in the 1984 Qatari television series Fayez Al Tosh and the 1996 Kuwaiti series Bu Habash, where she played the wife of the main character Bu Habash, a man known for his frugality and lack of generosity. In 1985, she featured in Qatar's second locally made children's series, Jassim's Adventures, produced by Qatar TV and filmed in Studio 4. Other shows she acted in include The Big House (1990) and Excuse Me, Father (1994). In 2018, she took part Ghanem Al Sulaiti's television series What's Happening?, where she filled the role of the wife of the main character, appearing in five episodes.

Saeed took part in many plays, including Ibtisam by the Dock (1984), Antar and Abla (1986) and Earthquake (1988).

== Filmography ==
=== Television ===
Year	Title	Role	Notes
1984	Fayez Al Tosh		
1990	The Big House		
1994	Excuse Me, Father		
1996	Bu Habash		
