= Jassim Abdulaziz =

Qatari television presenter

- جاسم عبد العزيز
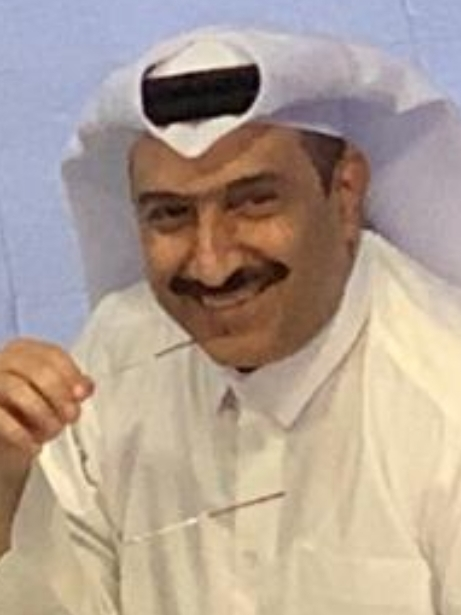
- Born: Jassim Mohammed Abdulaziz Al-Ahen - جاسم محمد عبد العزيز الاهن; January 1, 1963; Mushayrib
- Died: December 1, 2020; Doha
- Education: Qatar University
- Occupation: Television host

Jassim Mohammed Abdulaziz Al-Ahen widely Known as Jassim Abdulaziz (1 January 1963 – 1 December 2020) was a journalist and media personality in Qatar and other Arab countries in the Persian Gulf region.

== Early life and education ==
Jassim Abdulaziz was born on 1 January 1963 in Msheireb (مشيرب), one of the oldest district and neighborhoods in the heart of Doha, Qatar. He studied engineering at Qatar University, Doha before entering the media industry.

Jassim Abdulaziz had a passion for the media from a young age, which paved the way for his later professional career.

== Career ==
Jassim Abdulaziz commenced his career as a news presenter in 1983. In addition to presenting the news, he also hosted cultural and sports programs. Emrah wa Erbah (امرح واربح) was one of the popular game shows he hosted. He also presented programs related to national and religious celebratory events, including Night of Eid (ليلة العيد), a popular show to which various celebrities, including media and sports personalities from Qatar and other Arab states, were invited to celebrate the special occasion. He died on 1 December 2020 after a short illness.

== Posthumous honors ==
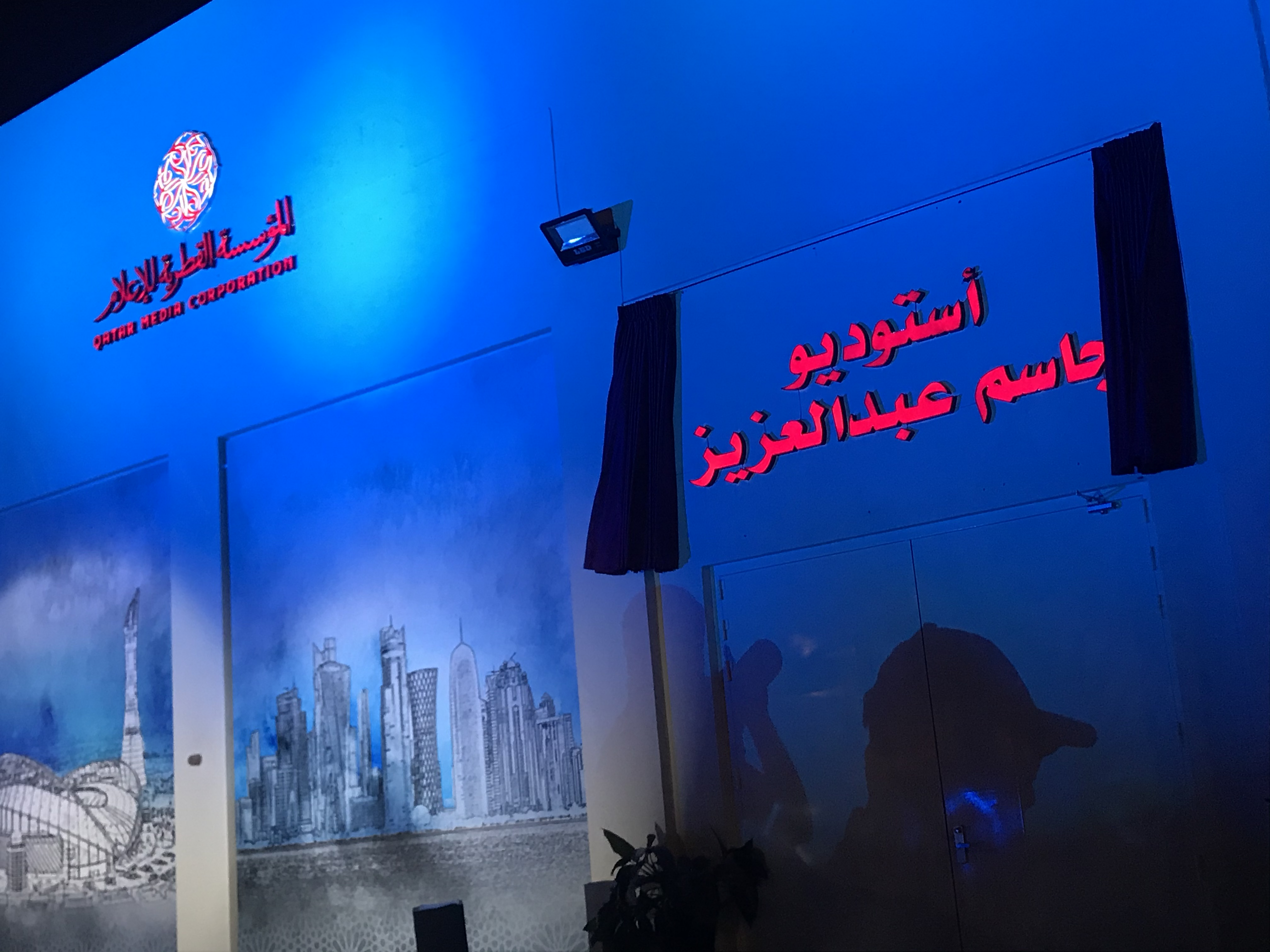
Jassim Abdulaziz television studios

Abdulrahman bin Hamad Al Thani, CEO of Qatar Media Corporation, inaugurated new television studios bearing the name of Jassim Abdulaziz (جاسم عبدالعزيز)، in honor of his media career.
