= Mouza al-Malki =

Qatari writer and psychologist

- Occupations: Assistant professor, psychologist, writer

Mouza al-Malki (Arabic: موزة المالكي) (also known as Moza al-Malki) is a Qatari writer and psychologist.

== Early life and education ==
Al Malki holds a Ph.D. in clinical psychology from the University of Abertay Dundee, Scotland.

She is the first Qatari psychotherapist practitioner, having received her degrees in the United States.

== Career ==
Al-Malki is a psychologist, professor and consultant whose programs have been regularly broadcast on television and podcast channels. She is also known as an international speaker, writer, author, teacher, trainer, newspaper columnist and winner of various regional and international awards.

Al Malki was the first woman to drive in Qatar. She was also the first Qatari woman to teach English in an elementary school. Malki also introduced play therapy clinics in the Arab world and works with autistic children with exceptional talents. Al Malki has developed a program for children with dyslexia, too.

In 1999, she became the first female candidate in the GCC to contest a municipal election. An assistant professor at the University of Qatar of Qatar and author of several books on Arab women and issues concerning children, in 2005 Mouza (or Moza) was among 1000 women nominated as a group for the Nobel Peace Prize by Ruth-Gaby Vermot-Mangold, a Swiss parliament member.

In 2008, she was declared a peace ambassador.

She released a book entitled "Promising Writers" in 2014, which compiled a number of literary works composed by Arab female writers.
