= Fatma Shaddad =

Qatari musician and actress

Fatma Shaddad (Arabic: فاطمه شداد; 1962 – 23 November 2020) was a Qatari musician and actress. Best known for forming the country's first all-female band, she has been described as a pioneer in Qatari folk music.

== Biography ==
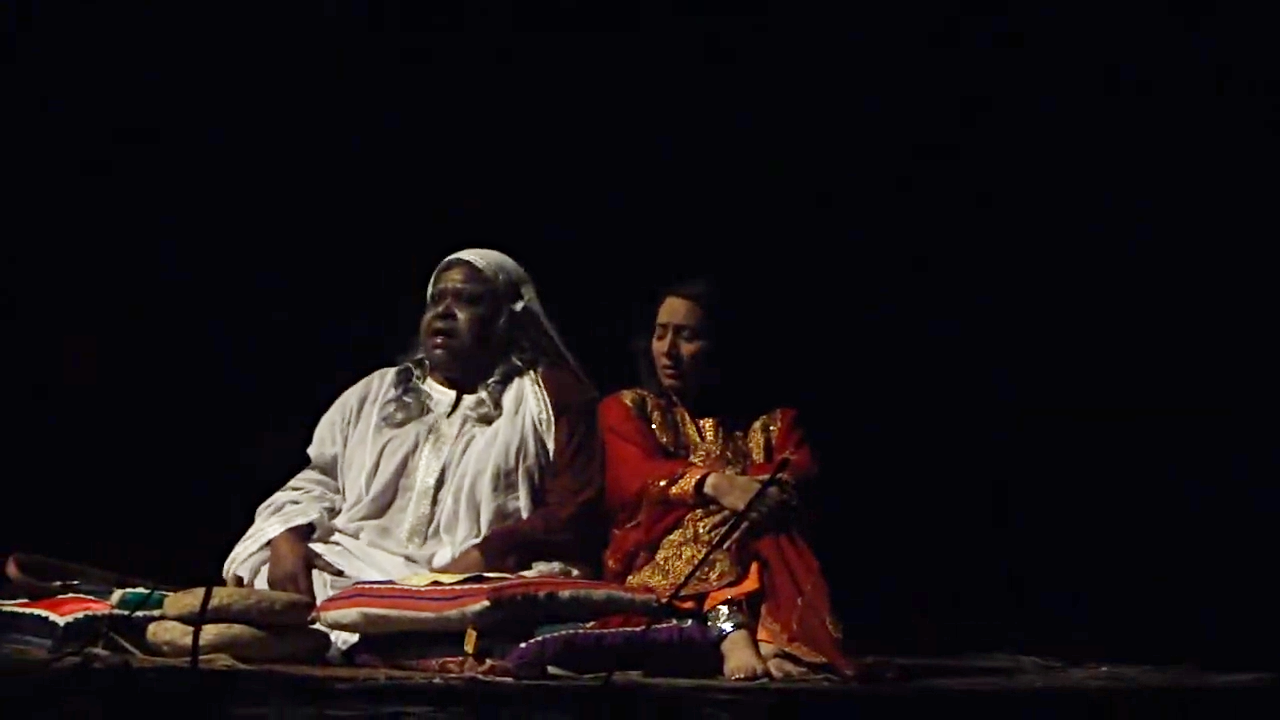
Fatma Shaddad (left) performing in Al Bushiya (2012)

Shaddad was born in Qatar's capital city Doha in 1962 to an Afro-Arab family originally brought as slaves from the Horn of Africa (Indian ocean slave trade). Her interest in singing stemmed from her childhood. Her father led an amateur band, Al-Shadadiya Folk Band, and often held training sessions in the family home, where Shaddad listened in and memorized the songs. Following her father's death, the task of managing the band fell to her mother. In the 1980s, Shaddad suggested that the band members ask their daughters to join her in establishing a band, to which they agreed, resulting in the formation of Qatar's first-ever female band. Her band performed at venues throughout Qatar and had its music broadcast on Qatar Radio beginning in 1986. Early on in her career, she was subjected to both verbal and physical harassment by some members of the community, as it was seen as a societal taboo for women to sing in the presence of men.

Some of her early inspirations to which she credited her musical style were the Qatari artists Halima Bint Marzouq and Asmaa Al Hareb. She also sought the assistance of Qatari researcher Youssef Bin Hassan in developing a style that was purely representative of Qatari folk music.

Her most popular song was Gharby Hawakom ya ahl el Doha (Arabic: غربي هواكم يا أهل الدوحة), released in 1988, which was played and adapted by other artists all over the Persian Gulf region. The song was also played during Qatar's diplomatic functions. It was composed by Khalifa Jumaan Al Suwaidi, who had also assisted her in composing other songs. Other songs performed by Shaddad include Raddak Allah Alayna, Hakatha Al-Dunya and Wa Ya Ayn Maliya. After her original band dissolved, in 1996 she founded the Nahda Women's Band for Folk Arts.

Shaddad was also involved in Qatar's theatre scene. She participated in the play Majarih, whose narrative is set around slavery in the Persian Gulf, at the 2010 Doha Theatre Festival to much acclaim. The play won three out of the festival's nine awards, including an Appreciation Award received by Shaddad for her operatic performance. In 2012, during the theatrical play of Al-Bushiya, Shaddad played the role of the grandmother Umm al-Khair, and introduced a novel element by performing Al-Nahham, a traditional sea music form typically sung by men during fishing trips. Her participation marked the first time a woman has performed this art on stage in the Gulf, with choreography and music designed by Mohamed Al-Sayegh. For this, she won the event's Appreciation Award.

In 2015, she recorded two duets produced by Sawt Al Rayyan. The first was a duet with Saudi singer Mohammed Abdu entitled Ya Bint al-Nass, written by Kuwaiti poet Abdel Latif Al Bannai. This collaboration happened after Shaddad presented a song during his opening segment at a musical festival in Doha, impressing him to the extent that he requested they make a song jointly. The second was a comedic musical video sung with Kuwaiti artist Khaled Al Mulla and composed by Mishal Al-Arouj.
