= Abdulaziz Jassim =

Qatari actor and comedian (1957–2018)

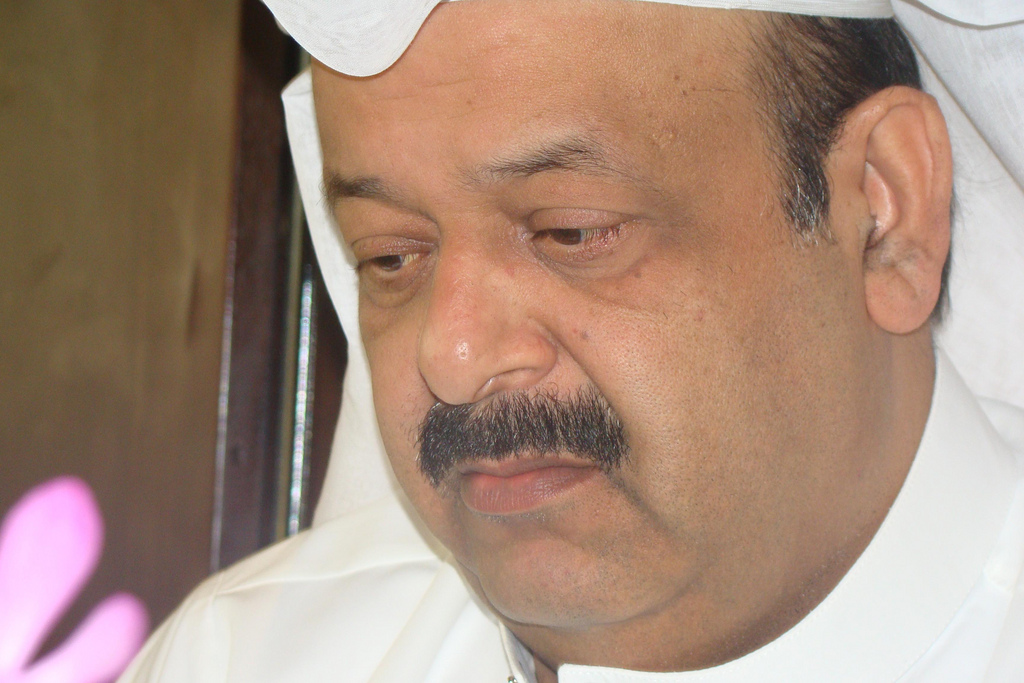
Abdulaziz Jassim

Abdulaziz Jassim (Arabic: عبد العزيز جاسم) (1 February 1960 – 14 October 2018), was a Qatari actor and comedian.

He began acting in 1977 at Al Sadd Theater and then began working with actor and playwright Ghanem Al Sulaiti in 1979 and a comedy duet for several years. He worked in many works in the roles of evil and eloquence in drama and even comedy. In 1985, he acted in Ghanem Al Sulaiti's play The Fighters, presented at the second Carthage Theatre Festival in Tunisia. The play would go on to win two awards.

The "Another Day" series in which the alcohol addict who neglects his family is the beginning of success and the public's awareness of it more, exploited this success by presenting many of the works that received the same share of success as after The diaspora, When she sang flowers, Yes and no. A disease in his late life reduced his involvement in the work and his last work in 2017 was a play entitled "Deira Ezz".

Died on 14 October 2018 in Bangkok, Thailand after a long illness at the age of 58 years.
