= Ghanem Al Sulaiti =

Ghanem Al Sulaiti (Arabic: غانم السليطي; born 1 January 1956 in Manama, Bahrain) is a Qatari playwright and actor. He is active in both Qatar's theatre scene and in television. He is best known for his politically themed plays.

== Theatre ==
Al Sulaiti graduated from Dar Almualimeen where he, along with his classmates, acted in plays. The first play he acted in was The Garment Looks the Best with a Patch from its Own Material in 1971. He and his classmates would go on to form Qatar's first official theatre group known as the Qatari Theatrical Troupe in 1972. However, upon finding himself barred from acting roles, he would form his own troupe the next year, known as The Student Acting Band. His first experience in writing plays came at the age of sixteen when he wrote and acted in a 1972 play titled House of Ghosts (Bait Al-Ashbah), being inspired by an event experienced by one of his relatives. He would go on to participate in four other plays in the mid-1970s before going to Egypt for university. Upon his return, he wrote and starred in numerous other plays in Qatar, and in 1981 began to present plays in Kuwait and Bahrain.

His 1985 play The Fighters (Al Mutarishqun), also translated as The Pelters, was one of the most highly regarded plays in Qatari theatre upon its release. Written in classical Arabic and directed by Ali Mirza, the play was presented by Qatar's delegation at the second Carthage Theatre Festival in Tunisia the same year, where it won Al Sulaiti two awards: the Best Actor Award and the Best Theatrical Art Award. The play starred himself, Ghazi Hussein, Abdulaziz Jassim, Mohammed Abu Jassum, Abdullah Ahmed, Sinan Al-Maslamani, Faleh Fayez, Abdullah Ghaifan, Salah Al-Mulla, Saleh Al-Mannai, Bahraini actress Amina Al-Qaffas, Khaled Al-Ziyara and Ghanem Al-Rumaihi.

The play focuses on the national tragedy of the Arab community, highlighting contradictions and differences that cause conflict both within and between communities. It explores these themes in a comic and sarcastic manner, embedding bitterness and grief to create a reflective atmosphere. The play uses the backdrop of two fictional states, Al-Hibal and Al-Jibbal, each with its own ruler and in a state of continuous conflict with each other, sometimes reaching the point of war. Characters in the play, such as Dhoa-al-Makan and Ifraidon, embody symbolic roles. Dhoa-al-Makan represents the people's conscience, emphasizing honesty and moral integrity. Ifraidon, portrayed as coming from the "country of light," serves as a mediator to reconcile the rulers, symbolizing the spirit of unity among citizens. Al-Sulaiti's use of documentary theatre is evident as he blends real social issues with artistic expression.

In 1986, Al Sulaiti founded Qatar's first theatrical production company. That same year, he wrote the company's first production, Antar and Abla, based on the life of Antarah ibn Shaddad. It was the first Qatari play to run continuously for an entire month as well as the first to be taped and redistributed on VHS.

On 2 November 1988, he presented his play Earthquake for the first time at an event attended by the eventual Emir of Qatar, Hamad bin Khalifa Al Thani. The play proved successful, and Al Sulaiti would continue presenting plays throughout the Persian Gulf region, including UAE's Sharjah, Dubai and Al Ain, and Oman, Kuwait, and Bahrain.

Controversy broke out over Al Sulaiti's 1995 political play Hello Gulf, which criticizes the lack of progress achieved by the Gulf Cooperation Council since its inception. In 1997, the play was set to be presented in Egypt. Despite his play being promoted on the streets of the Egyptian capital Cairo, then-president Hosni Mubarak prohibited the play's performance. Nonetheless, Al Sulaiti continued his work in Egypt, presenting his play Glory of The Arabs in 1998 after receiving explicit approval from Egyptian authorities.

He won the Sharjah Award for Arab Theater Innovation in 2016.

== Television ==
Early in his career, Al Sulaiti produced two television series, Ahlam Sahi (1981) and Eid and Saeed (1982). However, these were met with limited success. In contrast, Al-Sulaiti excelled as an actor in television series, taking part in the Qatari television show Ahla Al-Ayyam in 1981, earning him recognition among the Qatari audience. He would find more success when he appeared in the popular Qatari television series Fayez Al Tosh, which first began airing in 1984.

During the 2017-2021 Qatar diplomatic crisis, wherein a group of GCC countries led by Saudi Arabia, the United Arab Emirates, Bahrain and Egypt severed all ties with Qatar and imposed a blockade on it, playwright al-Sulaiti wrote a series of satirical dramatic sketches "mocking the absurdity of the blockade", called What's Happening?. He later turned the sketches into a theatrical production.

== Personal life ==
Al Sulaiti was born on 1 January 1956 in Manama, the capital of Bahrain. He has numerous family backgrounds, his father being Qatari, his mother Emirati and his grandmother Saudi. He lived in Bahrain for part of his childhood before his family moved to Qatar. In 1978, he graduated from Egypt's Higher Institute of Dramatic Arts.

== Filmography ==
=== Theatre ===
Year	Title	Role	Notes
1985	The Fighters		
1988	Earthquake		
1995	Hello Gulf		
1998	Glories of the Arabs		
