= Central Municipal Council =

The Central Municipal Council (CMC) of Qatar is an advisory body to the Ministry of Municipality consisting of 29 elected members, representing 29 constituencies. It is a purely advisory body, holding neither executive nor legislative powers, and the municipalities are managed by the ministry. Members are elected for a four year term. The CMC is the only elective institution in Qatar.

Because the CMC has nearly no practical authorities, and disenfranchises the large majority of Qatar's population (the foreign workers), it has been deemed by scholarship to be "neither representative nor efﬁcient in its duty".

== Introduction ==
In 1952, the first municipal council was formed, and was restructured in 1956. Doha municipal council was formed in May 1963, after the government conceded to protests by nationalist movements. In 1972, the Ministry of Municipality was established, functioning as a supervisory authority over municipal affairs.

The Central Municipal Council was created and had its first election in 1999, based on Law No. 12 of 1998.

== Voting regulations ==
Qatari citizens over 18 years old, males and females, are able to vote, barring some exceptions. Up until 2015, naturalized citizens could vote starting 10 years after the date of their naturalization, but Law No. 38 of 2005 completely eliminated any possibility for naturalized citizens to "exercise any political right, regardless of the date of naturalization". Other groups barred from voting include those convicted of a criminal offense, or anyone working with the police or armed forces.

In order to vote, eligible citizens must first register to vote at the Ministry of Interior. Registration is for each individual election, meaning that registering for one election does not make one registered to future elections.

The 29 constituencies do not coincide with the number nor with the borders of the municipalities of Qatar. This inconsistency means that candidates need to orient their campaign and be accountable to those in their electoral district, and not to those in the municipality in which they reside.

== The Council Sessions ==
The Council holds its ordinary meetings in Doha and in public once every two weeks. Extraordinary meetings must be requested by one third of the members. The meetings are considered regular only where the quorum of two thirds of the members is available. The maximum period for which a meeting can be put off for lack of quorum is three days, after which the meeting can be held with the attendance of one third of the members. The Council issues its resolutions by plurality of votes. Under the supervision of the chairman, the Council forms a Secretariat General and appoint a Secretary General. The job of the Secretary General is to prepare the meetings' agenda and submit thereof to the chairman, record the minutes of the meetings and the council's recommendations and submit, to the Minister of Municipal Affairs and Agriculture, those parts of the recommendations that call for his or any higher authority's action.

== Power and functions ==
The CMC is a purely advisory body, holding neither executive nor legislative powers. It advises and lobbies the Ministry of Municipality, which manages the municipalities directly.

=== Public perception of limited authority ===
The CMC's lack of authority has been cited as a central reason for lack of interest in both voting in CMC elections, and in running for re-election. The perceived limitation in the CMC's authority was a recurring theme in a focus group discussion held at Qatar University. Participants cited the council's constrained powers as a primary reason for their hesitance to register and vote in elections. Such critiques have been echoed in media reports and by CMC members themselves. Sheikha bint Yousuf Al-Jufairi, who was re-elected in 2015 and chairs the CMC's Legal Committee, had previously emphasized the necessity of amending Law No. 12, which defines the CMC's functions, during her 2007 campaign. Similarly, Khalid Al Kuwari, a victorious candidate in 2003, highlighted the Council's limited executive authority as contributing to low voter turnout. He also noted the lack of representation for the expatriate population, who are not considered in municipal discussions on public health, environmental concerns, and infrastructure needs despite being the majority in many urban areas. The expatriates, who share neighborhoods and facilities with Qatari citizens, remain excluded from consultation on these issues, despite making up a large majority of the country's population. Because the CMC has nearly no practical authorities, and disenfranchises the large majority of Qatar's population (the foreign workers), it has been deemed by scholarship to be "neither representative nor efﬁcient in its duty".

== Candidate eligibility ==
The law (No. 1 of 2011) was issued by the Deputy Emir and Heir Apparent, Sheikh Tamim bin Hamad Al Thani, on Thursday 20 January 2011. The legislation amends Law No. 12 of 1998 regulating the Central Municipal Counciland the amendments were made on the recommendations of the Advisory Council. It is, however, not known if all the recommendations of the Advisory Council have been incorporated in the new legislation.

=== Age limit ===
Qatar has raised the minimum age limit to 30 years from 25 for its citizens to contest Central Municipal Council elections. It was argued by the Advisory Council that since a man or woman is generally in a position to hold social responsibility only when he or she is 30, the minimum age to contest the CMC be raised to 30 years.

=== Place of residence ===
The Advisory Council's recommendation that a Central Municipal Council member must live in the constituency he represents is because he should be aware of local issues and knows local people. The new law also makes it mandatory for a candidate to contest from the constituency he is a permanent resident of and his name appears on the local voters' list. After a contestant wins the election, he or she needs to continue residing in the same constituency.

=== Employments ===
Members of the Advisory Council also suggested in their recommendations that no citizen who is employed with the police, paramilitary or defence forces or any government department be allowed to contest the Central Municipal Council poll.

== Election results ==
Actual turnout rates for elections in Qatar are difficult to know, since the country does not publish the number of people eligible to vote. Instead, what authorities call "turnout" is the percentage of voters out of those who chose to register to vote. Registration is for each individual election, meaning that registering for one election does not make one registered to future elections.

=== 1st Municipal Council Elections in 1999 ===
248 candidates including 6 women contested the 4-year term of 29 seats. Polling date was set for Monday 8 March 1999, and 21,995 eligible males and females registered to cast their votes in their respective constituencies.

=== 2nd Municipal Council Elections in 2003 ===
The Ministry of Interior announced on 7 April 2003, the final results of the elections of the second Central Municipal Council in which 25 members out of 88 candidates won and 4 members including a woman were elected unopposed. Nearly 40% of the total voters of 21024 exercised their franchise. Sheikha Yousuf Hasan Al Jufairi was the first lady to win the elections.

=== 3rd Municipal Council Elections in 2007 ===
The third session of the central municipal council elections were held on April 1, 2007, with the participation of 51.1%, of the electorate. 13,656 out of 28,153 eligible voters cast their ballots in 27 constituencies to choose 27 members from 116 candidates.

Three women were elected in 2007. One was reelected to her Old Airport constituency with the highest number of votes of all candidates; and two won unchallenged.

=== 4th Municipal Council Elections in 2011 ===
The number of registered voters reached 32662 while the numbers of the total contestants were 101 including 4 women. From the total 29 constituencies, the voting was conducted in 27 while the candidates of other two constituencies such as Msaeid and Shahhaniyya were elected unopposed. In total, 13606 voters cast their votes in the 4th edition of the Central Municipal Council with a percentage of 43.3% from total number of voters.

=== 5th Municipal Council Elections in 2015 ===
Five women contested the 2015 polls as candidates. Two women were elected to the CMC after winning their constituencies, heralding the first time two women have occupied seats in the council.

The 2015 elections witnessed the merging of a number of depopulated constituencies and the addition of several new constituencies.

=== 6th Municipal Council Elections in 2019 ===
The 2019 elections were held on 16 April 2019. The official number of people who voted is 13,334, about 1/13th of the Qatari population, and nine percent lower than in 2015.
