= Sheikha bint Yousuf Al-Jufairi =

Qatari politician

Sheikha bint Yousuf Al-Jufairi (Arabic: شيخة بنت يوسف الجفيري) is a Qatari politician. Since 2003, she has served on the Central Municipal Council (CMC) in Qatar from the Airport constituency.

She holds a Bachelor of Laws degree from the Arab University of Beirut. She is the Head of the Legal Committee of the Council.

In October 2021 she was one of two women appointed to Qatar's advisory Shura Council.
