= Carthage Theatre Festival =

Carthage Theatre Festival أيام قرطاج المسرحية
- Location: Tunis, Tunisia
- Founded: 1983
- Awards: Tanit d'or
- Language: French; Arabic; English
- Website: http://www.jtctunisie.org/

The Carthage Theater Days or Journées Théâtrales de Carthage ("Carthage theatre days") is a theatre festival hosted by the government of Tunisia that was started in 1983. Taking place every two years, this theatre festival alternates with the Carthage Film Festival.
