= Qatar Radio =

Qatar Radio إذاعة قطر
- Doha; Qatar

Programming
- Languages: English, Arabic, French, Urdu, Spanish

History
- First air date: 25 June 1968

Links
- Website: qatarradio.qa

Qatar Radio (Arabic: إذاعة قطر), abbreviated as QR, is a Qatar Government owned public service national radio station in Qatar which is owned and run by the public service broadcasting network Qatar Media Corporation (QMC). Broadcasting is multilingual, with Arabic, English, French, Urdu, and even Spanish being represented.

== History ==
In 1965, Qatar's first radio station was created. It was broadcast on Fridays and relayed the Quran, religious programs and news. This event paved the way for the official formation of Qatar Radio on 25 June 1968. Broadcasts were made from the Al Kheesa transmission station.

Qatar Radio started broadcasting on a medium wave in Arabic for a total daily duration of five hours during two periods: one and a half hours in the morning, and three hours in the evening. At the close of 1968, the transmission was upgraded from 10 kilowatts to 50 kilowatts.

Transmission hours were raised to nine hours in 1969, and by 1970 had been increased to 13 hours. By 1982 there were nineteen hours of transmission, and finally in 2002 Qatar Radio began non-stop transmission.

In an effort to cater to non-Arabic speakers, an English program was established in 1971. It had a transmission duration of one hour at that time, eventually increasing to 19 hours by 2004.

In 1979, Qatar Radio installed a new short-wave transmitter which assisted in increasing the number of programs and transmission time. The station began broadcasting Urdu transmissions in 1980 on a medium wavelength for a duration of one hour. This time was raised to three hours in 1989.

A program for French speakers was launched in 1985 on a medium wave, having a daily up-time of three hours.

The Holy Quran service was launched by Qatar Radio in 1992. It discusses various aspects of the Quran and tackles modern-day issues in the context of Islam.

== Eurovision Song Contest ==
Qatar Radio (QR) was an associate member of the European Broadcasting Union (EBU) in 2009, but was removed sometime later possibly because of inactivity. All competing countries of the Eurovision Song Contest must be active members of the Union. The broadcaster first revealed on 12 May 2009 that they were interested in becoming active members of the Union, which would allow the nation to compete in the Contest. Qatar Radio has stated that they hope to join Eurovision by 2011.

Qatar first became involved in the Contest at the 2009 edition, where the broadcaster sent a delegation to the contest and broadcast a weekly radio show called '12pointsqatar' dedicated to Eurovision, which received favourable responses and has initiated the further involvement of Qatar in Eurovision.

Qatar Radio has said that they feel that they would be happy to join all other competitors in the contest, including Israel if Qatar gets membership.

Qatar is required to have a broadcaster which has at least associate membership of the EBU in order to have a chance to take part, as Qatar Radio is only a radio station and Qatar lies outside the European Broadcasting Area and cannot apply for Council of Europe membership with Australia being the only exception after being an associate member for over 30 years. The broadcaster would most likely be Qatar Television (QTV) also owned and run by the Qatar General Broadcasting and Television Corporation. If Qatar Radio gets accepted too, then they would be able to air the contest alongside the television broadcast.

== Satellite ==
Es’hail-2 is the first Amateur Radio communication satellite in Qatar. It is positioned at a 26° east orbital position and provides TV Radio broadcasting and direct-to-home (DTH) services across the Middle East and North Africa.
