= Qatar Television =

Qatari public television channel

Qatar TV
- Logo used since 2012
- Country: Qatar
- Broadcast area: Middle East, North Africa, Asia-Pacific,
- Headquarters: Doha, Qatar

Programming
- Language: Arabic
- Picture format: 1080i HDTV

Ownership
- Owner: Qatar Media Corporation

History
- Launched: 23 August 1970; 56 years ago

Links
- Website: qtv.qa

Qatar Television, (Arabic: تلفزيون قَطَر, romanized: Tilifizyūn Qaṭar); abbreviated as Qatar TV (or QTV), is a Qatari government-owned public service national television channel which is owned and run by the Qatar Media Corporation.

Launched in August 1970, QTV was the first television network to produce and transmit its own programmes in the country. The network broadcasts various programmes including news, economical bulletins, documentaries, religious programmes and entertainment.

== History ==
In the late 1960s, Qatar initiated plans to establish a national television service, later to be known as Qatar TV, under the Ministry of Information. The project involved constructing a central broadcasting station in Doha equipped with modern studios, production equipment, and transmission facilities. Extensive efforts were made to recruit and train Qatari staff in technical, editorial, and production roles, with some sent abroad for specialized training in other Arab and international broadcasting institutions. Trial operations featured pilot productions of news, cultural segments, entertainment programs, and coverage of national events, to prepare for a regular broadcasting schedule.

Qatar TV's inaugural official broadcast, thereby marking the commencement of regular public transmissions, took place at 5 p.m. on 15 August 1970, approximately two years after the launch of Qatar Radio in 1968. It quickly became an established presence in households and government institutions across the country.

Programmes were aired every day for three to four hours with a 50 kW transmitter broadcast on channel 11. Spillover enabled its signal to be received in parts of other Gulf countries and southern Iran. In 1974, it began transmitting color broadcasts. It had a monopoly on television audience until 1993, when Qatar Cablevision began broadcasting satellite channels. Despite the broadening of television offerings, Qatar TV remains popular amongst locals.

Preparations for a new HD studio were underway in 2012.

== Content ==
The channel has a strong traditionalist offering, with heavy amounts of religious and self-help programs, as well as news bulletins. In 2013, it purchased its first Turkish series, Karadayı.

== Logo ==
Qatar Television has had three logos since its inception. The first was a drawing of a falcon, created by the station's in-house designer, Fouad Mohammad Ahmad Al Shibiny, who also made the national emblem. It was replaced in 2000 by a symbol representing the Al Dana pearl, created by Mohammed Ali Abdulla, and, in 2012, by the current one, featuring the calligraphic name of the country in Arabic, and the English name of the channel below.

== Channel frequency ==
- Eutelsat 7 West A 10834 V 27500 3/4 HD (MENA Only)
- Es'hail 2 10770 V 27500 3/4 HD (MENA Only)
- Galaxy 19 12184 H 22500 2/3 HD (North America Only)
- Hotbird 13G 11566 H 29900 3/4 HD
- Badr 8 12169 V 27500 3/4 HD (EMENA Only)
- Asiasat 5 4080 H 30000 5/6 HD (Asia-Pacific)

== See also ==
- Television in Qatar
