= Qatari folklore =

Qatari folklore largely revolves around sea-based activities and the accolades of renowned folk heroes. Like elsewhere on the Arabian Peninsula, folktales – known in Qatar as hazzawi – play an important role in Qatar's culture. Some of Qatar's folktales have a distinctive local character while others have been imparted by nomadic tribes wandering between the present-day Arab states of the Persian Gulf. Local folk stories were seldom documented, instead being passed down orally from generation to generation. After Qatar began profiting from oil exploration, the tradition of passing down these stories gradually ceased. Government ministries such as the Ministry of Culture and Sports and local universities have made efforts to preserve and transcribe local legends in publications.

Among Qatar's most noted folk heroes are Qatari ibn al-Fuja'a, a 7th-century war poet, and Rahmah ibn Jabir Al Jalhami, an 18th- and 19th-century pirate and transitory leader of Qatar. Recurring themes in Qatari folklore are djinn, pearl diving, and the sea. Almost every story has a positive moral behind it, such as honesty, strength or piety.

== Legends ==
=== May and Gilan ===
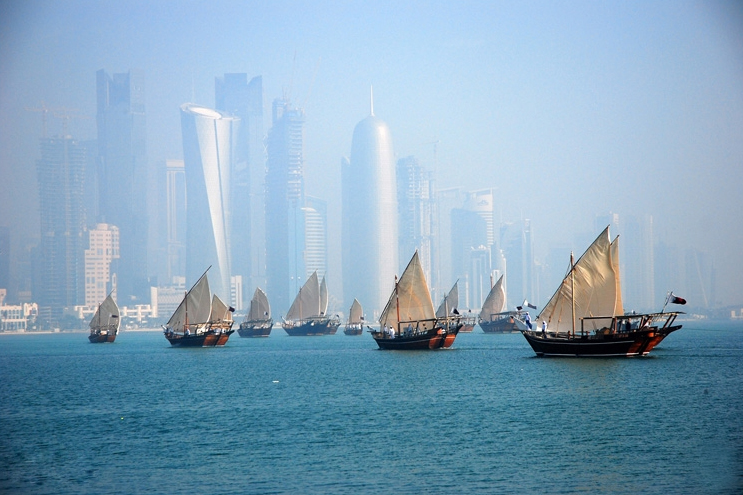
Dhows historically used for pearling at a Qatari dhow festival

The legend of May and Ghilân, once well known in the town of Al Khor, has been described as both a local legend (hikāya) and a foundational myth of Qatari pearling. According to tradition, the tale originated among the Al Muhannadi tribe, natives of Qatar's north-east coast whose members alternated between maritime and pastoral livelihoods. It combines two principal themes: the competition between a man and a woman, and the invention of the boat sail.

Set in the port of Khor Al Mahandah (present-day Al Khor), the story recounts that Ghilân, a wealthy and influential owner of pearling vessels, once dominated the local fleet. His supremacy was challenged when May, a woman with stronger and more experienced crews, began to rival him in reaching the pearl beds. On several occasions, her oar-powered boats outpaced his, prompting him to call out, "Tow us, O May!", to which she replied mockingly, "The towing is in the head of the oar".

Determined to regain his advantage, Ghilân is said to have drawn inspiration from the wings of a grasshopper, devising the idea of mounting sails on his boats. With the wind harnessed, his vessels soon outstripped May's. When she called out, "Tow us, O Ghilân!", he answered, "The towing is in the head of the mast". In the logic of the tale, this innovation both secured Ghilân's victory and reaffirmed a male predominance in an occupation historically closed off to women.

The narrative structure consists of five short episodes, punctuated by the repeated phrases about the oar and the mast. While the invention of the sail is the central motif, later retellings often remembered May and Ghilân simply as the initiators of pearl fishing itself. The story's circulation appears to have been largely confined to Al Khor, and by the late twentieth century it was already little known outside the town. Its decline has been attributed to the death of the older generation of pearl fishers and the absence of efforts to revive the tradition.

=== Bū Daryā - "Lord of the Sea" ===
The Lord of the Sea tale is famous in Qatar as well as the rest of the Persian Gulf region. The story revolves around a water djinn named Bū Daryā, who terrorizes sailors and pearl divers. It remains a well-known tale among Qatar's older population, particularly those who worked in maritime activities.

The legend attains its name from the protagonist, Bū Daryā. In Arabic, bu or abu translates to "father", while darya originates from the Persian term for "sea". Although the second word has Persian origins, the legend has not been documented in any known Persian literature. An alternative name for the protagonist is Shayṭān Al-Bahār, Arabic for "devil of the sea". Bū Daryā was seen as a terrifying and colossal half-human half-amphibian who preyed on those out at sea. Many sailors and pearl divers of the past were convinced of Bū Daryā's existence and took special precautions should they encounter him. In fact, according to one version of the legend, Bū Daryā would sneak onto unsuspecting ships at night before scurrying off with crew members whom he would devour, and in some cases sink the ship. This provoked seaward travelers to take turns on night watch duty in case of an attack. It was said that those who witnessed the sea creature in person would be cursed and afflicted by ailments ranging from nausea to hallucinations.

Wailing-like calls, similar to those of a siren, are reported in the second version of the legend. Unsuspecting sea travelers who would answer these pleas would face their doom at the hands of Bū Daryā. If a whole ship responded to the call, then its resources would be plundered and in most cases, the ship would be sunk. As per this version, the only way to repel the hypnotic calling would be to repeat Quran verses. The second version represents a less fanciful depiction of Bū Daryā and contains more elements pertaining to the unknown dangers awaiting in unexplored and undocumented areas of the open sea. It also attempts to reconcile faith and religion with long-held customs to provide a moral to the story.

=== Homarat Al-Guyla ===
Known by multiple names, such as Homarat Al-Guyla (translating to "female donkey of noon") and Umm Homar (Donkey Lady), this legend revolves around a half-woman, half-donkey creature that preys on children. Parents, particularly mothers, caution their children to remain indoors during the height of the day, as this is when the creature prowls. Clad in black, she can be identified by the distinctive sound of her hooves, which incites fear and sends children running.

The Donkey Lady's origins are shrouded in mystery, but she is infamous for her deceitful tactics. She appears when parents are napping after a morning of hard work, knocking on doors and calling out to children, asking for food or water. If the children obey their parents' warnings and do not open the door, Umm Homar becomes aggressive, pounding on the door to frighten them. In some versions of the story, she can transform into a lizard to climb walls or is followed by three ominous black dogs.

== Folktales ==
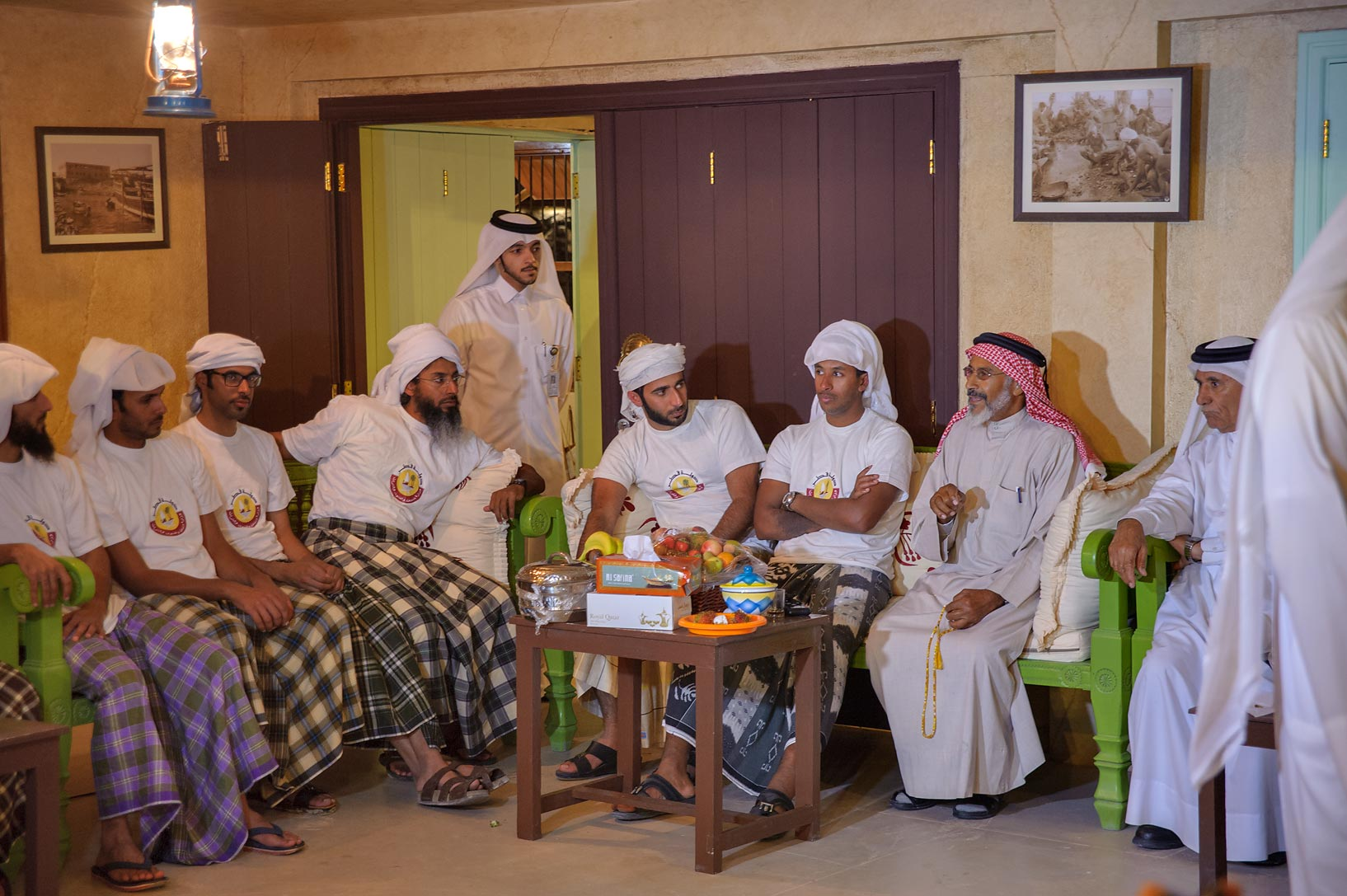
A folklore troupe having a meeting in a majlis

A rich tradition of storytelling is present in Qatar and is considered a vital way to preserve local culture. Aside from being passed on between family members at home, the majlis and desert camps also served as venues for transmission. It was common for women, particularly the grandmothers, to fulfill the role of storytelling within a family. They are usually told to children starting from the age of four, and can either be narrated or sung. Folktales are seen as being vital for the acculturation and development of children.

Some tales are based on ancient Nabati poems, which is a type of poetry endemic to the Arabian Peninsula.

=== Genres of folktales ===
Qatari folktales can be divided into four main categories: witticisms (torfah), anecdotes (nadirah), wisecracks (molhah) and jokes (noktah). The first genre, referred to as witticism in English, provides a combination of social criticism and sarcasm delivered in a witty manner. Humor is not necessary for witticisms; in fact, many witticisms do not highlight elements of humor, but of misfortune and misery. Nonetheless, this misery may be still be communicated in a lighthearted and exaggerated way for entertainment purposes.

An example of the witticism, or torfah genre, is the story of Far Boufarah Khayes Al-Merara, narrated by Qatari folklorist Ahmed Al Sayegh. In it, a delusional man kills a mouse with a sword and pridefully places it in front of his doorstep in an attempt to showcase his masculinity. When his wife notices the dead mouse, she does not share his enthusiasm and instead views it as the unnecessary slaughter of a defenseless creature. Incensed, the husband expresses his strong dissatisfaction with his wife's attitude and threatens to divorce her. After his mother-in-law was informed of the incident by his wife, she visits him and on entering the household, questions who it was that has slain the mighty lion at their doorstep. The husband arrogantly claimed responsibility and, encouraged by his mother-in-law's enabling of his delusional state, moved to forgive his wife for her perceived transgressions. Thus, witticisms can be seen as playing important social roles, with their morals often providing relevant and sensible advice to its listeners. In this context, the lesson taught is, that spouses may have to make compromises and entertain one another's egos, at least to a small extent, for a marriage to be successful. Other common morals taught by witticisms include knowing when to remain silent and being vigilant against thieves and fraudsters.

=== Themes of folktales ===
Folktales vary widely in theme, ranging from mythical settings featuring jinn, ghouls and black magic, to themes that better reflect reality such as the natural environment, pearl diving or the rapid pace of urbanization. Jinn and the sea feature prominently in several stories. In Islamic tradition, jinn are intelligent entities formed by Allah from smokeless fire. Similar to humans, they possess free will and the ability to choose their actions. Jinn occasionally decide to interact with the human realm, either to help or to cause harm, and are sometimes capable of wish granting. Stories that involve jinn include Al-Sofra wal Qadah wal Mushaab, Al Fisaikra, and Hamad and Hamda.

Cannibalism is a prevalent theme in Qatari folklore, captivating audiences by inducing fear. It incorporates several associated elements such as the unsuspecting victim, the predatory consumer, societal stigma, and accompanying shame. In some tales, cannibalism is central, while in others, it plays a lesser role. It often appears as a mid-narrative event rather than at the beginning or end of the story. Cannibalism appears in both realistic and fantastical narratives, involving humans and jinn. Some of the stories in which it appears are Hadid Hadiduh, Sorour (in two versions), Laibah al-Sabr, Tuwaisa al-Sabr, and Nassif. In the distant past, certain tribes and individuals in the Arabian Peninsula have been accused of consuming human meat, primarily in times of famine, serving as a foundation for some of these folktales. Witches are often the main perpetrators of intentional cannibalism, and children, often provided with little to no identifying information, are the primary victims in these stories.

The story of Sorour focuses on a child named Sorour, who, after his mother's death, endures the mistreatment and animosity of his stepmother while living with his father. This narrative follows a familiar pattern in Qatari folklore, where an orphaned child experiences hardship within a stepfamily, often emphasizing the plight of orphanhood. In the tale, three groups unknowingly consume human flesh: Sorour's father, the stepmother's family, and the father's guests. The father and the stepmother’s family are directly related to Sorour, while the guests have no familial connection. The guests remain unaware of the nature of the meat they have eaten, while the father and the stepmother’s family eventually realize that they have consumed the flesh of their kin. This revelation is intended as an act of revenge orchestrated by the stepmother.

The story features no deliberate intention of cannibalism, but was a calculated act by the preparer of the meal. The guests' awareness of the gruesome truth remains ambiguous, whereas the stepmother’s family comes to this realization upon discovering human remains in their food. Supernatural elements, such as voices from Sorour's deceased mother in the cemetery and a talking cat, provided the revelation about the consumed flesh. The story also highlights themes of revenge and kinship, with the stepmother's act of cooking and serving the boy's flesh to his father and guests representing a severe breach of familial and social norms while also emphasizing the extreme lengths taken in the pursuit of vengeance.

In the folk tale Hadid Hadiduh, a witch is tricked into unknowingly consuming her child's flesh after mistaking her for Hadid Hadiduh, the story's eponymous protagonist. This revelation occurs only after a sequence of confrontations and clever maneuvers between the witch and Hadid Hadiduh. Despite her professed abilities, the witch's powers are continually undermined throughout the tale, ultimately proving ineffectual when she fails to identify the meat of her own offspring. This failure extends beyond her inability to distinguish the flesh; she is also deceived by Hadid Hadiduh, who disguises herself in the daughter's clothing. The witch is convinced by this visual deception and fails to discern the difference between the two girls' voices and appearances.

The tale of Nassif involves a woman who maliciously eats the fetus of her unborn child. In Laibah al-Sabr, a young girl, while hidden, witnesses a deranged Quran teacher (al-mutawa) roasting the flesh of her classmate in his house. Overcome with a sense of dread, the young girl believes that the man would be cleared of any wrongdoing if she were to report him due to the man's esteemed social status. The story ends with the girl helplessly bearing witness as the man consumes the boy's flesh.

=== Morphology of folktales ===
According to Vladimir Propp's Morphology of the Folktale published in 1928, the prologue is an essential component of all folktales. A prologue is defined as the opening section of a story that describes its setting, characters, and context. Most Qatari and other regional folktales begin with the phrase "Blessing of Allah be upon Muhammad" or a variant of this. Sometimes, in the conclusion, they will end a story with a closing sentence such as "rohna anhoom o jeena o ma atoona sheey", translating to "we came and we left, and we took nothing from them". Personal names are generally seen as unimportant in Qatari folktales, with characters usually referred to by their familial relation to the main character or their profession.

The narrative pace is usually quick and the stories short in length. Informal language is used and figures of speech occur frequently, and profanity, while not as common, also appears in some tales. Stories often revolve around multiple members of a family, and recurrent patterns can be seen in the family structure of protagonists, such as orphaned children, children with only one parent, and children with abusive stepparents. Examples of such dynamics can be found in the folktales of Al-Khadrabouna and Hamad and Hamda.

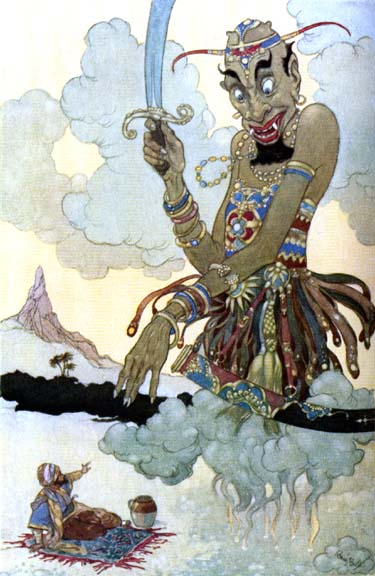
In some tales, Jinn appear as benevolent wish granters, while in others they are cast as the main villains

Common structures can be observed in Qatari folktales; with most tales starting with a basic demand, escalating to trials and tribulations, and ending with punishment and/or rewards. The aforementioned stories of Al-Khadrabouna and Hamad and Hamda as well as Al-Sofra wal Qadah wal Mushaab illustrate this structural archetype well.

In the Al-Khadrabouna tale, the prologue introduces an orphaned brother and sister. The plot of the story concerns the namesake, Al-Khadrabouna, a man with whom the sister falls in love and whom her brother contacts on her behalf. A villain is found in the girl's neighbor, who sabotages their meeting out of jealousy and weds Al-Khadrabouna herself. In the dénouement, Al-Khadrabouna recognizes the neighbor's deceit and marries the sister instead.

Hamad and Hamda is a story about two starving orphan siblings who set out on a journey to find a wealthy philanthropic Sultan who they believe can help alleviate their dire straits. Their journey is fraught with trials as they stave off starvation before falling in a well. A malicious jinn who resides within the well then threatens and frightens the two siblings. As the jinn is asleep, a miracle occurs as a ring worn by Hamad is revealed to have magic powers upon contact with the well wall and conjures an out-stretched snake for the children to climb and escape. Once out of the well, Hamad uses his magic ring to teleport them in front of the Sultan's son whom chauffeurs Hamda and Hamad to the Sultan's palace. Shortly after, the Sultan's son proposed to Hamda. The story ends with both siblings being offered a residence at the palace.

The protagonist of Al-Sofra wal Qadah wal Mushaab is a woodworker who has a basic need for wood to earn a living and provide for his family. As his area has been deforested, he had to embark on a journey in distant lands to find suitable clusters of trees. After arriving at a relatively densely treed area, he swung his axe into a tree thrice, only to summon a jinn on his third blow. The jinn identifies himself as a friendly spirit and awards the man with a magic table that conjures up food. Grateful, the man takes home the table and feeds his family, however, the family still complains of a lack of clothing and money. Therefore, the man returned the jinn, but upon the jinn's refusal of further assistance, he visited the Sultan and offered to trade him the table for supplies. He was scammed, being given only a pouch of rice and a sickly mule. He revisited and pleaded with the jinn, who this time provided him with a magic cup that would grant him anything he and his family should desire. He decided to take the cup to a blacksmith in order to secure it with chains to protect it against thieves. However, the blacksmith learned of the cup's secret and decided to pilfer it. This elicited the man to appeal to the genie for a third time and was given a magical axe. The man then used this axe to exact revenge upon the blacksmith and Sultan and retrieve his magical items, serving as a form of punishment for the villains of the story.

=== Hero archetypes ===
Some of the common hero archetypes found in Qatari tales include:

- The tolerant husband: The archetype of the tolerant and understanding husband in Qatari folktales portrays a man who comprehends and accepts his wife's circumstances and motivations. This character is often depicted in stories where, despite being deceived by his wife, he forgives her and raises a child as his own, even if the child is not biologically his. An example of this can be found a traditional tale where a father observes his children playing and notices two of them building houses of sand and clay, while the eldest farms and digs. He confronts his wife, demanding the truth about the eldest child's parentage. She confesses that the child is not his, but he forgives her, and they continue to live happily. In another story, The Two Sisters, the father forgives his wife for her deceit and ensures that the child she attributed to him receives his rightful financial share. This archetype contrasts sharply with the tyrannical kings who disown children born to slave girls, as often depicted in folktales.
- The blessed man: The archetype of the blessed man is depicted as an individual who benefits from divine favor. In one tale, The Sheep Fish, the blessed man's miraculous powers are illustrated. He touches fish that have been bewitched, and they revert to their natural state. The fish, grateful for their liberation, reveal they had been enchanted for two years and were originally wealthy. The blessed man's touch restores them, and he returns home with a herd of bulls.
- The intelligent and cunning man: This character, sometimes depicted as an orphan, is portrayed as possessing natural intelligence and sharp insight. Despite life's adversities, this man exemplifies patience and determination, ultimately overcoming obstacles through his resourcefulness. In one tale, Ibn al-Ajafa, also known colloquially as Ibn al-Mashatah, a poor man achieves success, amasses wealth, and marries the daughters of the Sultan, the minister, and the judge. Through these accomplishments, he restores his and his mother's honor and exacts revenge on the corrupt authorities. Physiognomy, a popular practice among Bedouins, is commonly used by this archetype. In one narrative, three Omani men demonstrate their shrewdness by identifying a thief who stole their money while they slept in the desert. Another tale involves the three Omanis using their observational skills to describe a lost camel they had never seen.
- The brave man: The archetype of the brave man is characterized by his courage, self-sacrifice, and desire for the welfare of others. Bravery is seen as one of the greatest virtues in Bedouin culture. Many tales frequently feature conspiracies and difficult circumstances that brave men must navigate. One illustrative story is Al Furousiya, where the youngest brother, born to a slave woman, embarks on a quest to find his brothers in India. Despite facing numerous trials, he successfully brings his brothers back and earns recognition from his father, the Sultan, who had initially doubted his abilities, but who ultimately appoints him as his successor. Another tale, Nassif, presents a different portrayal of bravery through a disabled hero. Nassif, despite his physical challenges, demonstrates greater courage than many able-bodied men by defeating a ghoul and rescuing the ruler's daughter. The ruler, who had previously underestimated Nassif, is forced to recognize his bravery.

=== Villain archetypes ===
There are many popular villain archetypes found within Qatari folklore. Common ones include:

- The tyrant: The depiction of an evil, authoritarian man often signifies a character with immense power over others. Such tales exhibit male dominance and a villain who embodies characteristics such as narcissism and selfishness. An example is provided in the tale of The Uncle and the Sister's Sons, where Uncle Bazid sacrifices his sister's four children in pursuit of his mistress. Bazid coldly tells his sister, searching for her children, "Your four children are dead, and you shouldn't grieve, for this is the way of the world". The tyrant can also be used as a vessel for critical social commentary. In the story The Seven Sons of the King, a king discriminates against his son born to a servant in favor of his other sons, despite the former's superior qualities and suitability for leadership.
- The treacherous man: The treacherous archetype embodies a man marked by betrayal and untrustworthiness. Such a character often lacks loyalty and fails to acknowledge previous favors. An illustrative story, The Husband's Treachery, revolves around a longstanding blood feud between two tribes. The husband, plotting to betray his wife’s brothers who are his guests, is thwarted by his wife. Sensing his intent, she sings out to her brothers, "O brothers, listen and understand. When he prepares his weapon and sharpens his sword, leave the camels and mount the horses". The motif of treachery is often interwoven with themes of racism and jealousy, for instance, in Al Furousiya, where two brothers conspire against their third brother, Ibn al-Abdah, who travels to India to rescue them. Despite his noble intentions, they regard him with contempt due to his status as the son of a slave. Similarly, in the story The Little Boy in the Well, the youngest sibling saves his brothers from thieves with his cleverness, only to be betrayed by them later. They throw him into a well, where he is eventually found by a passersby. These tales often mirror religious stories, such as the account of Joseph and his brothers, where exceptional qualities provoke envy and betrayal.
- The Jewish merchant: An example of economic antisemitism, a stereotype that can be found among Qatari tales is the Jewish merchant character, who is characterized as selfish, opportunistic and exploitative. These stereotypes are at least partially rooted in antisemitic stereotypes in Islam. An example of this archetype can be found in The Feather Dress, where a young boy, Mubarak, accompanies a Jewish merchant, seeking safety during his journey, only to be abandoned atop a mountain where he is surrounded by birds of prey.
- The malevolent cleric (al-mutawa): The archetype of the malevolent cleric, also known as al-mutawa, surfaces as a figure who, despite appearing to embody integrity and virtue, engages in deceitful and corrupt practices. One prominent story illustrating this archetype is The Talking Dowry and the Crystal, which involves elements of sorcery. In this tale, al-mutawa conspires with an evil stepmother, who plots to eliminate her stepson by enlisting al-mutawa to deceive her husband through falsely claiming that his wife is gravely ill and needs a boy's liver to recover. Another story, Laibah al-Sabr, depicts al-mutawa's house as a place where the Sultan's daughter, terrified by his actions, witnesses his sinister activities, which include cannibalism. This archetype primarily serves as a cautionary tale, warning against blind trust in those who claim moral and spiritual authority.

== Popular folktales ==
=== Al-Anzaroot ===
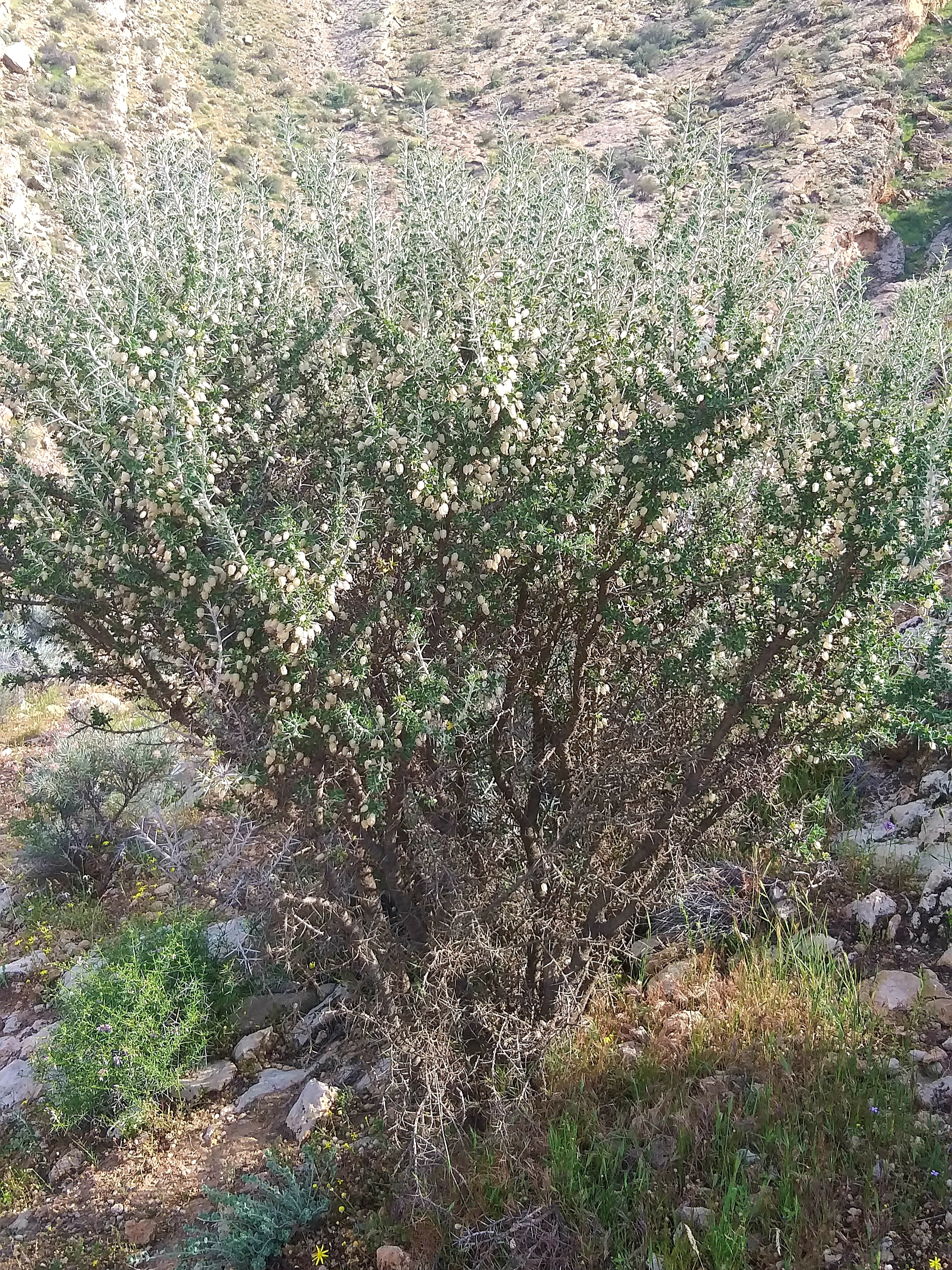
The anzarūṭ shrub

Al-Anzaroot revolves around a young man who struggles with his verbal memory. The protagonist is sent on an errand by his wife to collect the anzarūṭ shrub (Astragalus sarcocolla dymock), a dry herb prized in the Middle East for its medicinal uses, particularly in treating gastroenteritis. Along the way he forgets the name of the plant, and repetitively murmurs "mafeesh" (nothing) to himself. As he is walking along the coast, he encounters two superstitious fishermen who attribute their lack of catch to his repetition of "mafeesh". Thus, they hit him on the head and ordered him to repeat "two big, two small" instead in the hopes that it would help their chances. He then happened upon a burial service. His incessant muttering of the phrase "two big, two small" deeply offended the grieving family, causing one of them to strike him upon the head and ask him to instead repeat, "May God have patience and reward you".

The next venue he appears at is a wedding ceremony, where he once again offends the audience by mourning their joyous occasion. This induced a member of the audience to slap his head and encourage him to instead say "May God bless your actions and bring you joy". In the proceeding twist of irony, he stumbles upon two siblings who are engaged in a physical altercation. The elder of the two turned and kicked the man after hearing him express happiness at their quarrel, and ordered him to state that "You should treat your brother better; be kind to him". This phrase was expressed while walking past a man who was shooing a dog away from a mosque, and the words were considered inappropriate by the onlooker. He thus hit him on his head, and asked that he repeat "Go away, dog!". Finally, the man's journey brought him to a leatherworker who was in the process of attempting to slice a piece of leather, holding it in his teeth while he steadied his incision. Hearing the words "Go away, dog!" deeply upset him, leading to yet another strike on the head and the leather smith questioning him, "Do you want a slam with al-anzaroot?", using the term as slang for a hardy, strong strike. Suddenly, the man remembered what he set out to find, and hugged the leathersmith in appreciation.

Classified as a witticism, the story conveys a moral that signifies attentiveness to speech, social context, and timing, in determining the appropriateness of speech.

=== Al Fisaikra ===
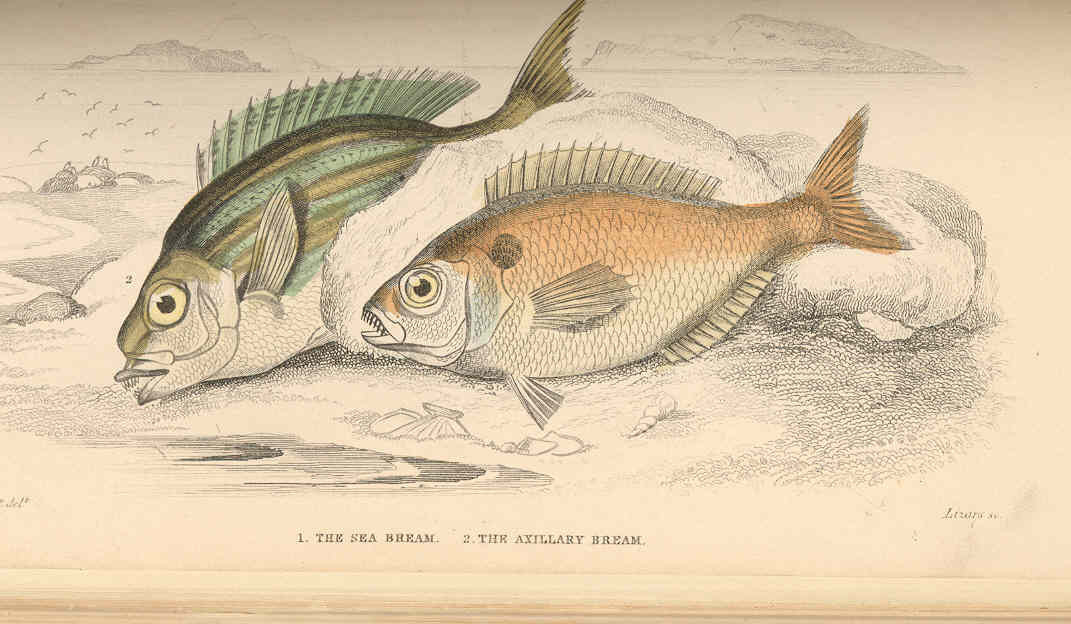
Sparidae, commonly known as porgy fish

In Qatari dialect, the two-banded porgy fish is known as al fisaikra. In Gulf folklore, this fish is considered a jinn that assists those in need. The tale of Al Fisaikra, recounted by Umm Khalaf, begins with an invocation to God. The main moral provided by the story is that goodness and patience are rewarded, while deceit and cruelty lead to ruin. The story has many similar elements to the classical folk tale of Cinderella.

Once upon a time, a kind-hearted fisherman lived with his daughter, Hamda, after his wife's passing. They led a happy life, with Hamda cooking the fish her father caught. One day, the father decided to remarry to provide companionship and support for his daughter. Hamda enthusiastically supported the idea and suggested a kind neighbor. The neighbor agreed, and soon they were married. The new wife soon bore a daughter, and her attitude towards Hamda changed. She treated her stepdaughter poorly, making her do all the household chores, while she pampered her own daughter. Hamda's father did not believe her complaints. After his death, Hamda was left alone with her stepmother and stepsister.

One night, neighbors gifted them a basket of fish, and the stepmother ordered Hamda to clean them at the coast. Despite her reluctance, Hamda obeyed. While cleaning the fish, the last one—Al Fisaikra—spoke to her, promising riches if released. Fearful of her stepmother, Hamda hesitated, and the fish escaped. Returning home, the stepmother was furious about the missing fish and sent Hamda back to find it. Hamda could not, and her stepmother denied her food, leaving her only bones. Distraught, Hamda returned to the shore to wash the dishes and cried out to Al Fisaikra. The fish reappeared, providing her with a feast. After eating, Hamda learned about a party where the sheikh's son sought a bride. Her stepmother locked her in the tanoor (oven) and went to the party with her daughter.

Al Fisaikra helped Hamda escape, cleaned her up, and dressed her beautifully. Hamda attended the party, catching the eye of the sheikh's son, who found a bracelet she accidentally dropped. The sheikh’s son declared he would marry the girl who fit the bracelet. Servants searching for the girl came to Hamda's house. The stepmother hid Hamda, but a rooster revealed her location. The bracelet fit perfectly, and the sheikh's son requested her hand in marriage. The stepmother demanded an extravagant dowry, which was provided. Al Fisaikra, appearing as a woman, prepared Hamda for her wedding by embellishing her with henna and kohl eyeliner. Following this, the stepmother maliciously forced Hamda to eat the gifts sent over by the sheikh, causing her great pain. The sheikh's son, transformed into a dog to transport her, later reverted to human form and helped her expel the pearls and corals she had consumed. They lived happily together thereafter. Jealous, the stepmother offered her other daughter to the sheikh's brother, demanding the same dowry. The daughter, forced to eat similarly by her mother, was taken by the brother of her fiancé, who once again transformed into a dog. When she expelled only digested food, he killed and ate her. The stepmother found her daughter's remains the next day, her deceitful plans having backfired.

=== A'ssoom and A'rooy ===
In the tale of A'ssoom and A'rooy recorded by Dhabiya Mohammed Al Khater, two young sheep named A'ssoom (derived from assam in Gulf Arabic, meaning "stubborn") and A'rooy venture into the countryside to graze on a spring morning. As it begins to rain heavily, A'ssoom suggests returning home for lunch, but A'rooy prefers to stay and sings a song welcoming the rain. A'ssoom, frustrated and humiliated by A'rooy’s refusal to leave, threatens to summon the wolf to eat her if she does not come back. Unfazed, A'rooy challenges A'ssoom to do so, leading A'ssoom to angrily depart and seek the wolf.

The wolf declined A'ssoom's proposition, prompting her to ask the dog to hunt the wolf. When he declined, she went to his owner and asked him to abuse the dog. Upon his refusal, she ventured to the barber and requested that he shave off the owner's beard. Again daunted by refusal, she suggested to the fire that it set the barber's hut ablaze; this too was declined. When she asked the water to extinguish the fire, it refused, so she asked the camel to disperse the water, but was still met with refusal. She attempted to convince the gadash (a type of insect) to sting the camel, but he did not accept. In her final plea, she begged the rooster to scare the gadash into compliance and was at last met with acceptance.

After the rooster successfully startled the gadash, it attacked the camel, causing the camel to leap in and disperse the water, some of which spilled into the fire, inducing the fire to set the barber's house ablaze. The distraught barber then cut off the man's beard, which angered him into beating his dog, and in turn, his dog pursued the wolf. Upon the wolf's arrival at the farmhouse, there was no sign of A'rooy, so he ironically consumed A'ssoom instead.

=== The Four Women and the Cow-Seller ===
The story of The Four Women and the Cow-Seller, collected by researcher Ali Al Fayyadh, begins with a man coming to a market to sell his cow. Four women sitting in the shade observe him and, amongst themselves, each boasts of her ability to either take his cow, his clothes, get him into trouble, or get him out of trouble, respectively.

The first woman approaches the man and convinces him to let her take the cow home to test if it produces milk, promising to pay him afterward. However, she does not return, leaving the man distraught. When the man questions the remaining women, they deny knowing her, claiming they just met her at the market.

Desperate, the man encounters the second woman in disguise, who tricks him into fetching a bucket from a well and steals his clothes while he is inside. The third woman, also in disguise, pretends to sympathize and offers to help, but she too deceives him. She takes him to a textiles shop, selects expensive fabrics, and leaves him there, pretending she forgot her purse at home, promising to return with money.

Meanwhile, the fourth woman goes to a graveyard, retrieves a child's body, and takes it to the textiles shop. She accuses the shopkeeper of killing her baby after setting the corpse under his feet, which causes a commotion. The shopkeeper, overwhelmed and desperate to avoid blame, agrees to give her the shop and release the man in exchange for her forgiveness.

=== The Golden Cow ===
The Golden Cow recounts the story of an affluent merchant who, after experiencing misfortune in his first two marriages, is blessed with a daughter from his third wife. However, following the death of his wife, the merchant remarries, leading to the mistreatment of his daughter by her stepmother. Seeking to escape her harsh reality, the daughter devises a plan to conceal herself inside a large golden cow crafted by a jeweler. Purchased by the ruler's son and placed in his chamber, the girl emerges from her hiding place to eat, eventually revealing herself to the young man. Moved by her plight, the ruler's son offers her protection and ensures her safety within his chambers.

However, when the golden cow is borrowed to decorate a bridal chamber, the girl unwittingly finds herself exposed and subsequently mistreated by the bride. Rescued by a kind water carrier named Fattoum, the girl receives care and refuge in her home. Meanwhile, the ruler's son falls gravely ill upon learning of the incident, prompting desperate attempts to cure him. After months of unsuccessful treatments, it is discovered that bread baked by Fattoum miraculously aids in the young man's recovery. Recognizing the girl's role in the healing process, palace officials persuade Fattoum to reveal her whereabouts, leading to her reunion with the ruler's son and subsequent marriage.

This tale, collected by Dhabiya Abdullah Al Sulaiti, illustrates themes of perseverance and eventual redemption within its narrative framework. It also incorporates the popularly used "wicked stepmother" trope that is evident in several Qatari folktales.

=== The Jealous Wife ===
In this traditional Qatari folk tale narrated by Umm Khalaf, a brother and sister lived together happily in their home. The brother, a fisherman, trader, and shepherd, provided for them, and they enjoyed each other’s company immensely. As time passed, the sister suggested that her brother should get married. She reassured him, saying, "Our neighbors have a daughter who is very kind. She will be like a sister to me." The brother took her advice and married the neighbor’s daughter. Initially, the new wife and the sister got along well. However, over time, jealousy crept into the wife’s heart, and she began to resent the sister. When the brother was away, the sister would talk to the moon from her window, as they had no electricity. She would say, "Greetings, father of happiness! O one who gives good company to virtuous girls in their mother’s house." The wife overheard this and, driven by jealousy, convinced her husband that his sister was behaving indecently. She claimed the sister had a secret visitor each night.

One day, a man selling eggs came by. The wife bought all the eggs, cooked them, and forced the sister to eat them. The sister’s stomach swelled from eating so many eggs, and the wife accused her of being pregnant. She convinced the brother to take his sister to the desert to kill her. The brother took his sister to an oasis, and as she slept with her head on his lap, he slipped away, returning home to his wife and claiming that he had killed his sister. When she woke and realized her brother had abandoned her, she was devastated. In the desert, the sister gave birth to twelve baby birds from the eggs she had eaten. The birds grew up and learned about their mother’s plight. They flew to the brother’s house and pecked at the window, trying to communicate with him, singing "The poor girl was only pregnant from the bird eggs she swallowed!"

Despite the wife’s attempts to dismiss them, the brother listened to the birds and followed them back to the desert. Meanwhile, a sheikh and his entourage discovered the sister. The sheikh, captivated by her beauty and goodness, asked her about her situation. She told him her story, and he decided to marry her. The brother, guided by the birds, arrived at the spot where he had left his sister, only to find her gone. The birds then led him to the sheikh’s home, where he discovered his sister safe and happily married.

=== The Sunni and His Friend ===
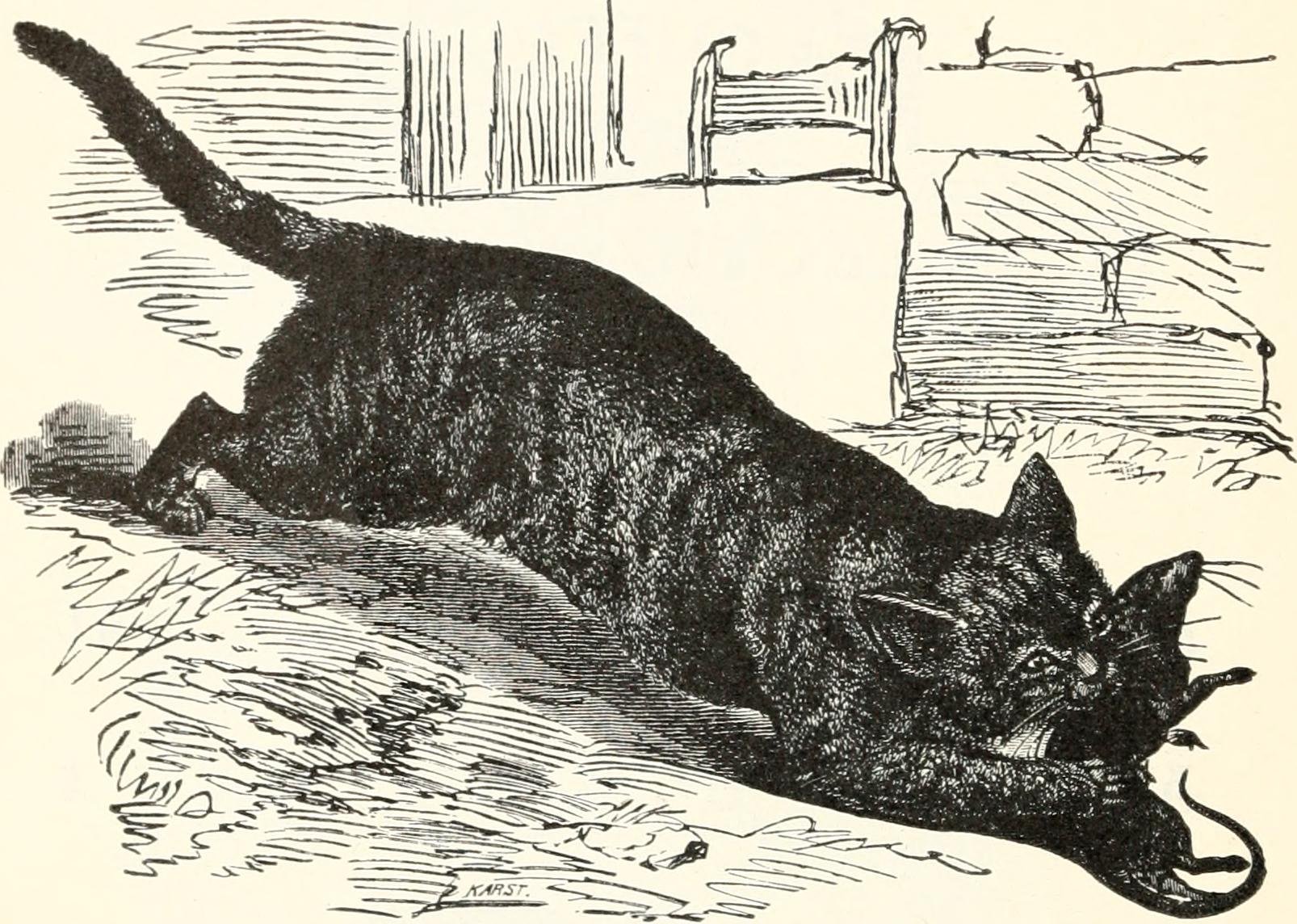
An illustration of a cat catching a rat

This Qatari folktale, told by Khalifa Al Sayed and translated by Tariq Ahmed, narrates the story of a devout Sunni man, who was not particularly wealthy or influential, who inherited a large estate and purchased a grand ship named Saphar. This ship was capable of long voyages, having sailed to places such as Oman, Aden, Mombasa, and India. Seeking business advice, the Sunni approached his untrustworthy and irreligious merchant friend, who suggested he load the ship with cats and sell them in Africa. Despite his skepticism, the Sunni followed this advice, capturing numerous cats and embarking on his journey.

In Africa, the local traders, plagued by a rat infestation, were overjoyed to see the Sunni's cargo. They bought the cats at increasingly high prices, allowing the Sunni to profit significantly and return to Qatar with a wealth of goods. Surprised and envious, the deceitful friend offered to undertake the next voyage himself. Mimicking the Sunni's journey, he too filled the ship with cats. However, upon reaching Africa, he found that the previously sold cats had befriended the rats, nullifying their usefulness. The traders rejected his cargo, forcing him to return to Qatar empty-handed, albeit with a letter confirming his attempt. The Sunni, upon learning of his friend's misfortune, remarked, "Indeed, he who digs a pit for his brother often falls into it", highlighting the moral lesson of the story about the consequences of deceit and envy.

=== The Thorn Tree ===
The narrative of The Thorn Tree recounts the tale of a childless married woman who, upon becoming entangled in the branches of a thorn tree, pledges to care for it if blessed with a child. Subsequently, she gives birth to a daughter and fulfills her vow by teaching the girl to tend to the tree daily. As the girl grows, she encounters a persistent man who repeatedly harasses her with questions about the number of the tree's leaves, to which she responds with inquiries about the number of stars in the sky, angering the man.

Seeking advice from a cunning woman, the man disguises himself in a woman's abaya and niqāb and gains entry into the girl's home where he tricks her into greeting him as a female family member, sharing a moment of embrace in the process. Upon realizing the deception, the girl plots her revenge. Inviting the man for coffee under the thorn tree, she intoxicated him with alcohol and herbal medicine, leaving him incapacitated. Subsequently, she masquerades as a male medicine seller wearing an agal, ghutra, and thawb, and successfully tricks the man's family into employing her services. Her plan works and the man recovers within days, followed by the girl revealing her triumph over his deceitful ploy.

This tale, collected by Kaltham Ali Al Ghanem, concludes with the acknowledgment of the girl's cunning and the defeat of the dishonest man.

== Mythical beings ==
Most of the figures from Islamic mythology are present in Qatari folklore, including angels, jinn (spirits), shaitan (devils), houris, and ghouls.

In the Lord of the Sea legend, the protagonist Bū Daryā is a malevolent half-man half-amphibian, who, according to some versions, attracts seafarers with a wailing call. This being bears some semblance with other sea-based mythological figures such as mermen and sirens. It is speculated that, since Bū Daryā is locally referred to as the 'lord of the sea', this legend may pre-date Wahhabism in Qatar since Wahhabi doctrine explicitly prohibits any entity other than Allah from being referred to as 'lord'.

Talking animals, a universal element that is present across all cultures, is common in Qatari folklore. A jinn which takes the form of a porgy fish is known as Al Fisaikra in Qatari dialect, but may also be known as Esfaisra, Fusijaira, and Bint Al-Nowakhtha. The fish is renowned for its supernatural powers, and it appears in the traditional tale of Al Fisaikra where it helps the oppressed protagonist.

Various mythical figures and supernatural dangers were used in cautionary tales warning children and young men. These tales were part of the cultural folklore intended to keep people away from potentially dangerous places and to encourage young men to stay off the streets at night. Examples of these include:

- Cemetery sorcerer (ساحر المقابر): A supernatural figure found at cemeteries who uses hypnotic powers to make people sleep and then drinks their blood, likened to Dracula.
- Ghoul (الغول): A demonic mythical creature that lurks in narrow alleyways at night. The fereej (neighborhood) of Barahat Al Jufairi in old Doha was reputed to have ghoul alley in the early 20th century, which was avoided by people after sunset. According to local lore, a cannibalistic ghoul haunted this street. The ghoul symbolized the real dangers of known child kidnappings that occurred in the area.
- Umm Ghannan (ام غنان): A legendary female jinn, also known as Umm Al-Duwais in other Gulf nations, who inhabits abandoned places. She is depicted as a malevolent jinn who takes the form of a woman with the primary aim of enticing and killing young men through various forms of seduction.
- Umm Homar (أم حمار): A half-woman, half-donkey creature that preys on children during the mid-day heat.

== Folk heroes ==
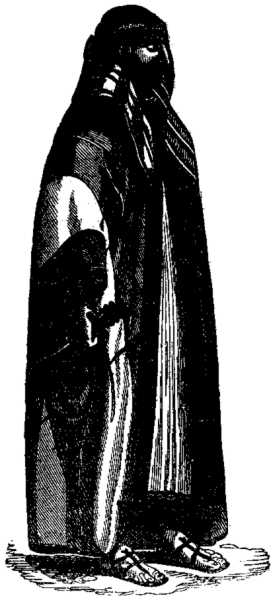
A sketch of Rahmah ibn Jabir drawn by Charles Ellms in his 1837 book The Pirates Own Book

Qatari ibn al-Fuja'a, a seventh-century war poet who was born in modern-day northern Qatar, is revered as a folk hero in the country.

A more contemporary folk hero can be found in Rahmah ibn Jabir Al Jalhami, an 18th- and 19th-century pirate and transitory ruler of the Qatar Peninsula. In his time, he was known as the "Scourge of the Pirate Coast". He also features prominently in Saudi folklore, specifically that of its Eastern Province.

Sheikh Jassim bin Mohammed Al Thani, often referred to as "The Founder", is a prominent folkloric figure, particularly due to his military achievements, his charitable donations and his promotion of Islam. He ruled Qatar for over 30 years starting in 1878.

== Folk traditions ==
Almost all folk traditions are Islam-related and have been practiced with relatively few alterations since Islam was introduced to the country in the 7th century. Many of these traditions are also broadly shared with neighboring countries, with notable variations between them.

=== Al Ghabqa ===
Al Ghabqa is a feast that takes place at night during Ramadan following iftar and tarawih prayers, traditionally shared between immediate family members. The feast features a variety of dishes, notably grilled and fried fish, rice cooked with date extract, and tharid—a meal combining crumbled bread, meat, and broth. The feat also includes an assortment of sweets such as luqaimat and asida, alongside dates, tea, and Arabic coffee.

=== Al-Musaharati ===
A custom once found all over the Middle East, al-musaharati roamed the farjan (neighborhoods) during the month of Ramadan, beating his drum to wake people up for suhoor, the meal consumed early in the morning by Muslims before fasting. This drumming would be accompanied by Islamic chants, such as "Wake up sleeper to worship the creator." Once common in the country, this tradition is rarely practiced nowadays, though there has been a revival in recent years.

=== Al-Nafla ===
Taking place on Sha'ban, the month prior to Ramadan, Qataris engage in preparatory rituals and communal gatherings known as Al-Nafla. During this time, families share traditional meals such as harees and tharid with neighbors and the less fortunate. Prayer songs are also sung on this occasion.

=== Garangao ===
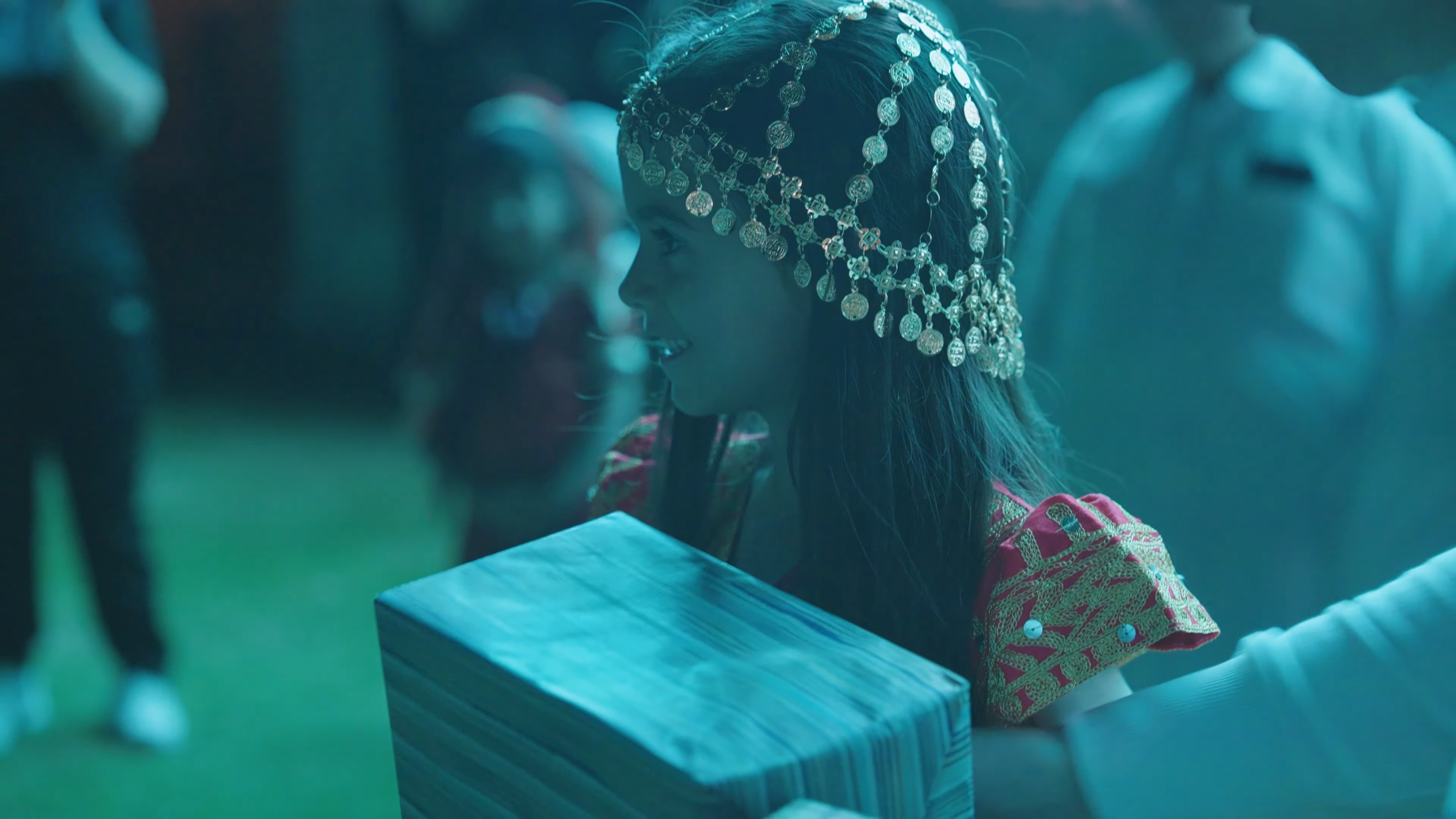
A girl wearing traditional attire receiving a present on Garangao

Garangao is a traditional celebration observed on the 15th night of Ramadan, marking its midpoint. The name of the festival is derived from the Arabic word garqaa, signifying a rattling or shaking motion. It is celebrated throughout the Middle East with slight variations between each country. On Garangao night, children don colorful traditional attire and visit homes in their neighborhoods, singing traditional songs and receiving sweets and gifts from residents. In the past, snacks such as malabas, walnuts, almonds, and chickpeas were handed out to children. Nowadays, the treats mostly consist of various forms of candy and nuts. The festival is characterized by children singing songs that bless the youngest family members' health and prosperity. In contemporary times, Garangao has evolved into a larger-scale celebration, with public events organized in shopping malls and cultural organizations.

=== Haya Baya ===
Haya Baya is a historical tradition that is practiced by girls aged 8 to 12 years old on the Day of Arafah, the ninth day of Dhu'l-Hijja in the Islamic calendar, which precedes Eid al-Adha. It is named after Dracaena trifasciata, commonly known as the snake plant in English and haya bayya in Qatar, alternatively spelled hia bia. In Bedouin society, while young boys were traditionally engaged in manual labor and slaughtering animals in the months leading up to Eid al-Adha, such work was not expected of young girls; thus, they used their time to take care of and nurture plants, particularly the snake plant, but could also include grains like wheat and barley. These plants would be grown in small wicker baskets made of palm fronds. These baskets were nurtured and grown for about eight days or more, starting from the first day of Dhu'l-Hijja. They would then be tossed into the sea at sunset on the Day of Arafah, symbolizing the larger sacrifices associated with Eid al-Adha.

During this ceremonial sacrifice, the girls dress in traditional attire, such as the al bakhnaq embroidered with zari thread, and perform songs specific to the occasion, such as praying to God to make their Eid joyous and for the safe return of pilgrims from Hajj. This historically provided an alternative form of participation of Eid al-Adha for girls. The practice continues to be promoted and practiced by cultural institutions.

=== Majlis Al Oud ===
On the first day of Eid al-Fitr, families hold large feasts in what is known as Great Majlis or Majlis Al Oud. During this event, it customary for the men of the family to congratulate their leader on the feast.

== Folk beliefs ==
Folk beliefs in Qatar encompass the various practices rooted in religious and superstitious traditions. Religious beliefs often revolve around rituals and interpretations aimed at averting perceived dangers or invoking divine protection. For instance, the occurrence of an object breaking was interpreted as the removal of evil, while hearing the call to prayer ahead of schedule prompted concerns of impending danger, leading individuals to seek shelter and perform additional prayers. Passing in front of someone engaged in prayer was deemed disrespectful, and believed to disrupt the connection between the individual and their deity.

Superstitions permeate various aspects of Qatar's cultural beliefs, with practices aimed at warding off perceived harm or misfortune. Among these, funeral prayers were often recited for individuals believed to harbor envy, accompanied by actions like discreetly sprinkling salt behind their backs to counteract their negative influence. The superstition surrounding open scissors warned of potential discord among family members, prompting swift closure of the shears. Similarly, sleeping on one's back was feared to invite nightmares, attributed to the devil's presence during sleep.

Cautionary tales advised against gazing directly at lightning to prevent blindness, while the arrangement of shoes in a reversed position was avoided due to its perceived disrespect towards God. Other taboos included sweeping floors at night, as this would disturb potential jinn residing in homes, and biting one's tongue during meals, as this was interpreted as an ominous sign of impending bad luck. Old Bedouin tales caution against using the branches of the Arabian boxwood (Lycium shawii) shrub for firewood as they are thought to harbor the spirits of entrapped jinn.

A common health-related belief still prevalent in Qatari society is the attribution of miscarriages, which are increasingly common in the country, to superstitious phenomena such as the evil eye and jinn. It was also believed that the blood of a slaughtered animal could treat excessive perspiration, particularly of the hands and feet. If an individual noticed large amounts of sweat on another individual's palms while greeting them, they would generally advise them to cleanse themselves in the hot blood of a freshly slaughtered animal to treat this affliction.

== Folk medicine ==
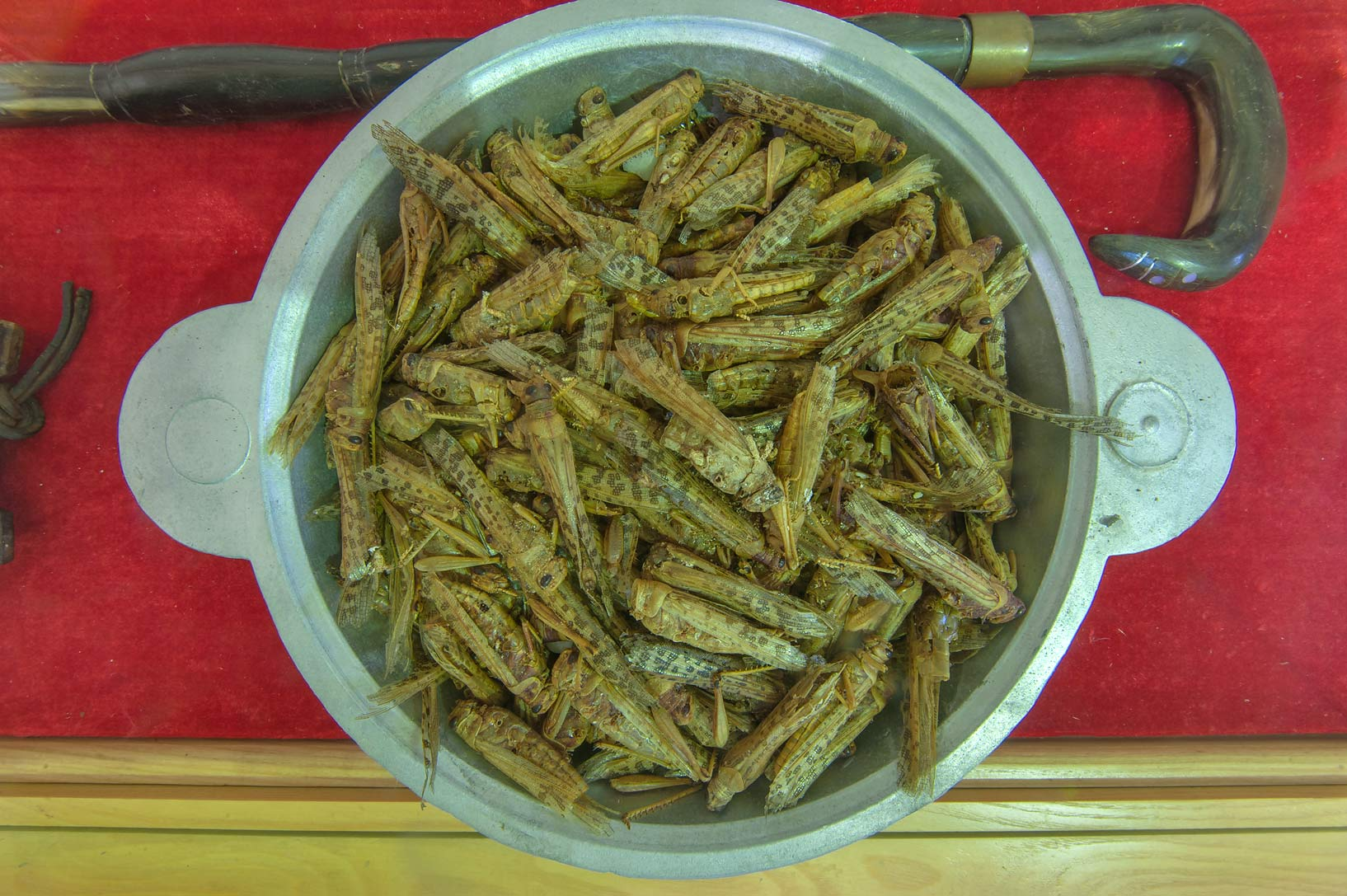
Bowl of dried locusts, a popular folk remedy and delicacy, on display at Sheikh Faisal Bin Qassim Al Thani Museum

Before oil was discovered, healthcare consisted of traditional medicine: barbers performed circumcisions and other minor procedures, and herbalists dispensed natural remedies. Cauterization was a prominent practice in folk medicine. Before embarking on a pearl diving trip, a sailor would often be cauterized to prevent ear problems from developing. The practice was also used to cure a number of illnesses. Abdulaziz bin Ahmed Al Thani, a state official during the 1930s and member of the ruling family of Qatar, was noted for his curing of illnesses by using cauterization. Cupping therapy was also a prominent feature of folk medicine. It was commonly used in conjunction with herbal therapy, a form of treatment which utilized traditional herbs in Islamic medicine. Bitter aloe was the most prized herb. Other natural remedies used by Qataris include incense, thyme and saffron. Locusts were also venerated for their purported healing abilities in local nomadic culture and were considered a delicacy because of their nutritious properties, leading to their additional use as livestock feed. Senna blends or crab meat and shrimp soup would also be prepared as a folk remedy. Of all the forms of folk medicine, herbal therapy was the most popular. Traditional practices were seldom documented, instead being passed down through oral methods.

== Folk proverbs ==
Most popular sayings in Qatari culture are not exclusive to the country but instead widely spread around the Persian Gulf region.

- "Gold is an adornment and a treasure": This proverb highlights the dual use of gold, both in bringing joy to wearers of gold-adorned clothing and accessories and as serving as a valuable asset and a repository of wealth.
- "Caution does not prevent fate": This proverb is meant to convey the belief that no amount of precautions can prevent the will of Allah.
- "If time is obedient to you, be obedient to it": This saying stresses the importance of flexibility in the face of changing or unfavorable circumstances.
- "We are all children of a village, and every villager knows his brother": This proverb alludes to the fact that people in close proximity can keep no secrets from each other, especially criminal or socially objectionable acts, and is used when someone is concealing something or being dishonest.
- "The protector is the thief": A popular Arabic phrase that has numerous global equivalents, it refers to how the "protector" of the masses, the government, can be corrupted and exploit its own people.
- "He who resembles his father has not done wrong": This alludes to the belief that it is inevitable for a child to replicate their father's mannerisms and actions, and that whatever bad deeds are done is out of their control.
- "Fire leaves nothing but ashes": This is a classical Arabic phrase is used to denounce children who have dishonored their fathers' legacies.
- "Blind and looking out a window": This proverb is used to describe people who vastly overestimate their own abilities.
- "If the bite is large, it will sink": This is a cautionary proverb warning individuals against taking more than they are entitled to, otherwise they risk losing it.
- "You have nothing but your nose, even if it is crooked": This advises listeners to be thankful for what they have despite shortcomings.

== Urban legends from the migrant community ==
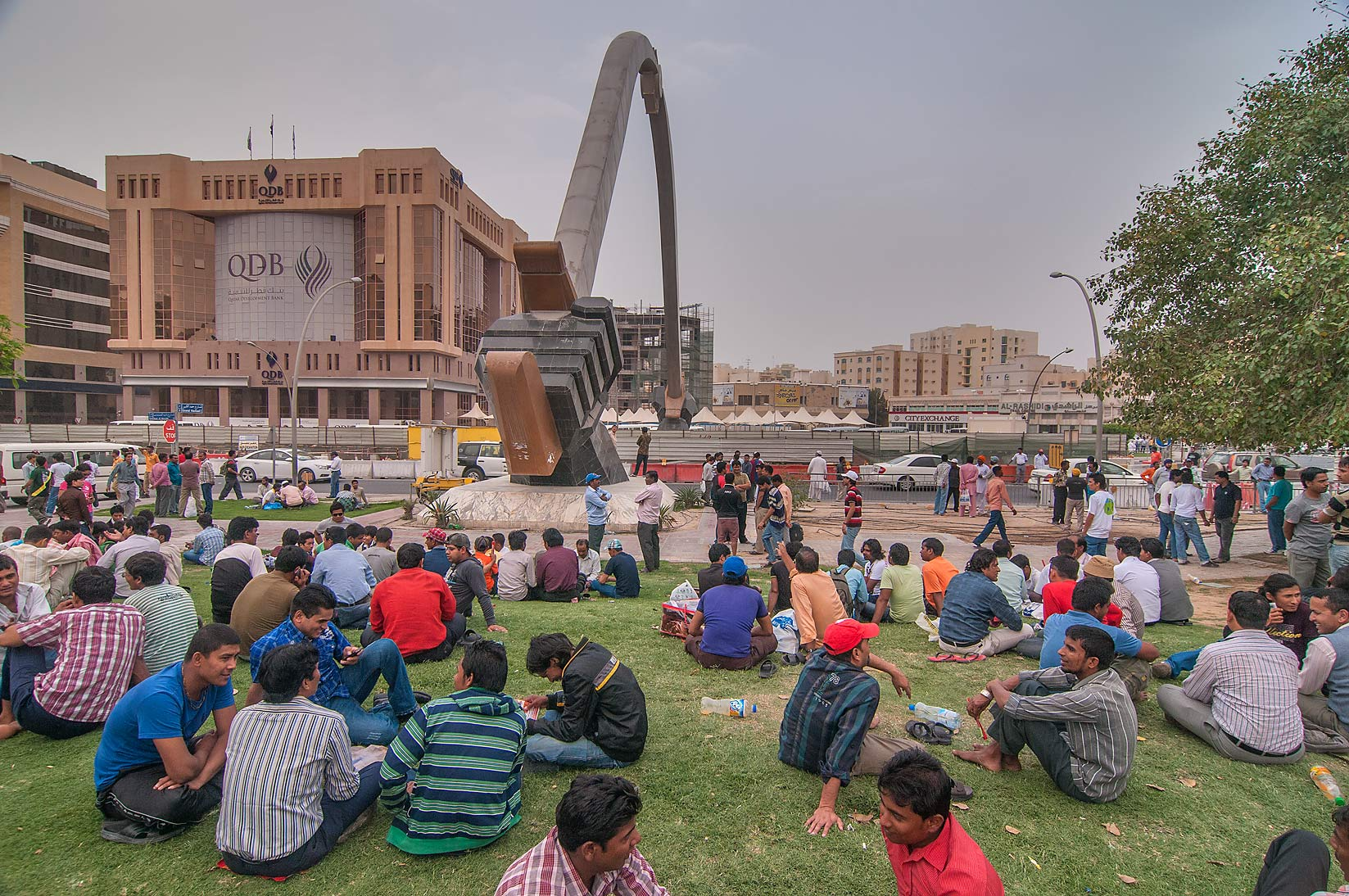
Migrant workers socializing in the capital Doha on a Friday afternoon

Foreigners constitute 85% to 90% of Qatar's population of 2.7 million, with migrant workers making up approximately 95% of the workforce, most of whom come from the Indian subcontinent and Southeast Asia and live in labor camps. The men residing in these labor camps typically work six days a week, with Friday as a day of rest. On Thursday nights, the streets are busiest as the men socialize and visit friends. Urban legends and myths circulate widely within this community, reflecting the collective experiences and anxieties of the migrant workers. They serve as a cultural outlet for workers, creating a sense of community and allowing them a role in Qatari society. A notable element among these urban legends is their extreme or exaggerated nature, with their falsehoods sometimes being immediately evident.

One prominent urban legend involves a young South Asian foreign worker who, after socializing on a Thursday night, was allegedly abducted by four Qatari women in a white Toyota Land Cruiser. According to the tale, the women offered him a ride, drugged him with a narcotic-laced drink, and drove him into the desert where they sexually assaulted him. The story concludes with the women returning the man to his original location and giving him 2,000 Qatari riyals before leaving. This story spread rapidly among various labor camps.

Another urban legend involves a Nepali migrant who allegedly fell prey to four Vietnamese cannibals in 2007. This tale, which gained traction among the migrant workers, painted the relatively newly arrived Vietnamese laborers as dangerous and cannibalistic. The story evolved with added details such as body parts found in refrigerators and human fingers appearing in X-rays, and it even featured in local newspapers, such as Al Sharq. This prompted the Qatari Public Prosecution to launch a probe into the incident and the Vietnamese embassy in Kuwait to threaten legal action against the newspapers. Many papers later retracted the story as unverified. Despite the retraction, some believed the story was suppressed by the state to protect its reputation.

Another legend describes a young Nepali migrant who encountered a five-headed snake on an isolated beach. After alerting the police and subsequent capture of the snake by zookeepers, the migrant allegedly died that night. This tale, which spread rapidly among the labor camps, led many workers to visit the zoo, hoping to see the mythical creature, with some even believing the snake was a reincarnation of Shesha, a Hindu serpent god. Despite their efforts, they found the snake had been moved to an unknown location, leading to further speculation.

A fourth legend revolves around an abandoned villa in Al Khor, where a female Indian domestic worker was supposedly sexually assaulted and murdered by her Qatari employer. The story includes elements of the paranormal, with reports of strange noises, disappearing furniture, and sightings of a ghostly woman in white who causes illness to those who encounter her. This tale, while likely embellished, reflects fears of mistreatment at the hands of Qatari employees within the migrant community.

These urban legends serve several functions within the migrant community. They act as instruments of governance, delineating boundaries of appropriate behavior in a culturally foreign setting. The stories also highlight the power dynamics between South Asian laborers and their Qatari employers, emphasizing the migrants' perceived powerlessness under the Kafala system. Additionally, these myths humanize the male migrant workers, who are often viewed as a homogeneous mass. They also serve to communicate the collective experiences and challenges faced by the laborers, offering a means of coping with their difficult realities.

== Preservation ==
After oil operations commenced in Qatar, a dramatic shift in societal customs was witnessed, resulting in a loss of cultural heritage. As folk stories were rarely documented in the past, there has been an urgency by Qatari authorities to preserve and record as much oral history as can be remembered. In particular, the Ministry of Culture and Sports (MCS) and local universities have been at the forefront of these efforts to transcribe Qatari folklore. The MCS and universities in Education City often collaborate with each other by jointly authoring books on Qatari folklore and organizing conferences.

In 1983, a joint effort was launched by the Gulf Cooperation Council (GCC) states known as the Arab Gulf States Folklore Centre (AGSFC, later renamed the GCC States Folklore Centre), and was headquartered in Qatar's capital city, Doha. The center was responsible for releasing books in Arabic and English, holding conferences and organizing workshops related to Persian Gulf heritage. Furthermore, the center published a quarterly journal known as Al-Ma'thurat al-Sha'biya. In 1984, the first-ever book documenting Qatar's folklore was published under the title Popular Stories in Qatar, written by Muhammad Talib Al-Duwayk and published by the AGSFC. The book is split into three main sections: the first section documenting the storytellers themselves, the second on the beginnings, patterns, and social uses of Qatari folk stories, and finally, the re-telling of several popular tales in vernacular Qatari dialect.

A project known as Swalif (meaning "stories" in Arabic) was launched by several Qatar University students under the supervision of faculty member Andrew Mills in 2010 to document oral stories and folktales through audio recordings.

== Modern adaptations ==
In December 2023, Qatar Museums released a four-part series of animated shorts revolving around the most prominent folktales in Qatar. Entitled Hazawy, which is the local term for "folktales", the series was produced by Sheikha Roda Al Thani. The inaugural episode features the legend of May and Gilan. The series had two of its episodes featured at the 2024 Columbus International Film & Animation Festival.
