= Ayatollah =

High-ranking title given to Usuli Twelver Shī'a Muslim clerics

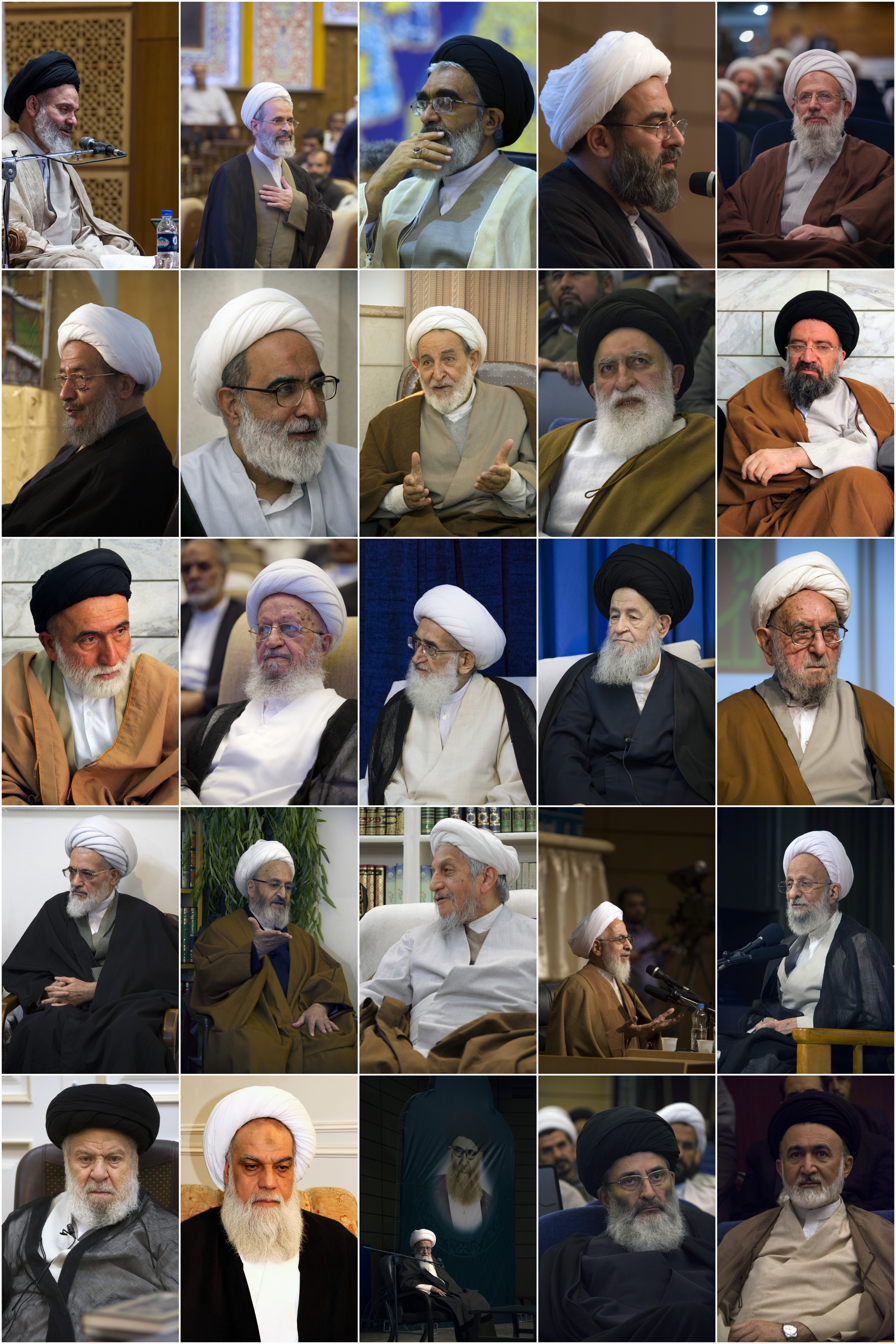
Ayatollahs of Qom, Iran; religious leaders who have the authority to interpret sharia sources in Shia Islam used assertive titles such as Hujjat al-Islam, Ayatollah, Ayatollah Al-Uzma and gained tutelage over people and the administration.

Ayatollah (Note: UK: /ˌaɪəˈtɒlə/, also US: /ˌaɪəˈtoʊlə/; Persian: آیت‌الله, romanized: âyatollâh [ɒːjjætˌolˈlɒːh], Arabic: آية الله, romanized: ʾāyatu llāh, lit. 'sign of God') is a title for high-ranking Twelver Shia clergy. It came into widespread usage in the 20th century. Those who hold this title must be men and specialists in Islamic sciences such as jurisprudence (fiqh) and principles (usul), often teaching in seminaries. The next lower rank among these clergy is Hojjatoleslam.

Originally used as a title bestowed by popular/clerical acclaim for a small number of the most distinguished marja' at-taqlid mujtahid, it suffered from "inflation" following the 1979 Iranian Revolution when it came to be used for "any established mujtahid". By 2015, it was further expanded to include any student who had passed their Mujtahid final exam, leading to "thousands" of Ayatollahs.

The title is not used by the Sunni community of Iran, as Sunnis do not believe in designated Imamate. In the Western world – particularly after the 1979 Iranian Revolution – it was associated with the Supreme Leader of Iran, especially Iran's first supreme leader Ruhollah Khomeini, who was so well known as to often be referred to as "The Ayatollah".

== Etymology ==
The title is originally derived from the Arabic word Āyah post-modified with the word Allah, making ʾāyatu llāh (Arabic: آية الله). The combination has been translated to English as 'Sign of God', 'Divine Sign' or 'Reflection of God'. It is a frequently used term in the Quran, but its usage in this context is presumably a particular reference to the verse 41:53 "We shall show them Our signs on the horizons and in their own selves", while it has been also used to refer to The Twelve Imams by Shias.

Variants used are ʾāyatu llāhi fī l-ʾanʿām (Arabic: آية الله في الأنعام, lit. 'Sign of God among mankind'), ʾāyatu llāhi fī l-ʿālamayn (Arabic: آية الله في العالمَین, lit. 'Sign of God in the two worlds', dual form) or fī l-ʿālamīn (Arabic: في العالمین, lit. 'in the worlds', plural form) and ʾāyatu llāhi fī l-warā (Arabic: آية الله في الورى, lit. 'Sign of God among mortals').

== Qualifications ==
Though no formal hierarchical structure exists among Shia clerics, a "hierarchy of difference" can be elaborated to describe the situation. Traditionally, the title Ayatollah was awarded by popular usage only to the very few highest ranking, prominent Mujtahid. Qualifications included

- being a definite Mujtahid,
- being regarded among peers as superior in aʿlamīyat (lit. 'superiority in learning') and
- being superior in riyāsat (lit. 'leadership'), which is determined by popular acclamation, as well as collecting a huge amount of Khums (religious taxes).

Consequently, by the 1960s a cleric addressed as an Ayatollah was expected to be a Marja'.

=== Devaluation trend ===
The title of Ayatollah (and other Iranian Shi'i titles) has been "cheapened" since then. Roy Mottahedeh describes how the title of ayatollah was determined in the mid to late 20th century.

Only the titles 'jurisconsult' (faqih) and 'model for imitation' (marja' al-taqlid) had fixed meaning. Otherwise titles ... really expressed the informal consensus of mullahs as to the degree of deference they wished to show one another. A teacher in madreseh might be greatly offended if a letter from a layman failed to call him 'ayatollah', but he would vigorously reject the title if addressed as an ayatollah in public – vigorously, that is, until he sensed that other mullahs of his level would tolerate hearing him so addressed, at which point he would quietly let his students impose the title on him.

According to Michael M. J. Fischer, the Iranian Revolution led to "rapid inflation of religious titles", so that almost every senior cleric began to be called an Ayatollah. raising the number of individuals who call themselves an Ayatollah dramatically. An unwritten rule of addressing for Shia clerics has been developed after the 1980s as a result of Iranian Revolution, despite the fact no official institutional way of conferring titles is available. At first the title that had been reserved for a Marja', was gradually applied to an established Mujtahid.

With the post-revolutionary bureaucratization of Shia seminaries under the Islamic Republic, four levels of studies were introduced and those clerics who end the fourth level, also known as Dars-e-Kharej (lit. 'beyond the text') and pass the final exam, were called Ayatollahs. Moojan Momen wrote in 2015 that every cleric who finished his training calls himself an Ayatollah and this trend has led to emergence of "thousands of Ayatollahs". This inflation led to invention of a new title, Ayatollah al-Uzma (lit. 'Great Sign of God'). Originally, about half a dozen people were addressed as al-Uzma, but as of 2015, the number of people who claimed that title was reportedly over 50.

=== Political connotations ===
Another post-revolutionary change in what makes an ayatollah has been the falling away (at least in many important situations), of purely religious credentials and informal acclamation, and its replacement by political criteria. Ali Khamenei – who was addressed with mid-level title of Hujjat al-Islam when he was in office as President of Iran – was bestowed the title Ayatollah immediately after he was elected Supreme Leader of Iran in 1989, without meeting regular unwritten criteria (such as authoring a Risalah). Since the 2010s, sources under government control have tended to give him more distinguished titles like Grand Ayatollah and Imam. Certain clerics, such as Mohammad Kazem Shariatmadari and Hussein-Ali Montazeri, who had fallen out of favor with the rulers were downgraded by not being addressed as an Ayatollah.

== Usage ==
=== Origins, early 20th century ===
The earliest known address of this title is for Ibn Mutahhar Al-Hilli (died 1374), however it was not in use as a title for those qualifying until the 20th century. Glassé states that following domination of Twelver branch by followers of Usuli school and demise of Akhbari school, the title was popularized by Usulis as an attempt to promote their status. Mirza Ali Aqa Tabrizi was the first one to use the term Ayatullah for the sources of emulation in Najaf, especially Akhund Khurasani (1839–1911), to distinguish them from the clerics of lower rank in Tehran, during the 1905–1911 Persian Constitutional Revolution. (Mirza Sayyed Mohammad Tabatabai and Seyyed Abdollah Behbahani were also given that honorific by constitutionalists according to Loghatnameh Dehkhoda.)

Hamid Algar maintains that this title entered general usage possibly because it was an "indirect result of the reform and strengthening of the religious institution in Qom". Abdul-Karim Haeri Yazdi (1859–1937) who founded Qom Seminary, may be the first to bear the title according to Algar. While the title Ayatollah was sporadically used during the 1930s, it became widespread in the 1940s. Following the Islamic Revolution, the title has become associated in the West with Iran's Supreme Leader, as the first two men to hold this position, Ruhollah Khomeini and Ali Khamenei, were both Grand Ayatollahs.

=== Stages of contemporary titles for Shia clerics in Iran ===
| | | | | | Usually a Marja' and issues fatwa |
| | | Can be a lesser Mujtahid | Can be a greater Mujtahid | Usually a greater Mujtahid |
| | | Allowed to receive charity |
| | Allowed to wear clerical clothing |
| Talabah (lit. 'Student') | Seghatoleslam (lit. 'Trust of Islam') | Hujjat al-Islam (lit. 'Proof of Islam') | Hujjat al-Islam wal-Muslimin (lit. 'Proof of Islam and Muslims') | Ayatollah (lit. 'Sign of God') | Ayatollah al-Uzma (lit. 'Great Sign of God') |

== Grand Ayatollah ==
Only a few of the most important ayatollahs are accorded the rank of Grand Ayatollah (Ayatollah Uzma, "Great Sign of God"). When an ayatollah gains a significant following and they are recognized for religiously correct views, he is considered a Marja'-e-Taqlid, which in common parlance is "grand ayatollah". Usually as a prelude to such status, a mujtahid (Note: Among the Shia, a mujtahid is a person generally accepted as an original authority in Islamic law.) is asked to publish a juristic treatise in which he answers questions about the application of Islam to present-time daily affairs. Risalah is the word for treatise, and such a juristic work is called a risalah-yi'amaliyyah or "practical law treatise". A Grand Ayatollah is often seen as a spiritual guide and mentor to millions of Shia Muslims. His influence extends beyond the mosque and into the social and political arenas. Unlike many religious leaders of other religions, a grand ayatollah is often involved in state affairs, especially in countries with large Shia populations such as Iran, Iraq, and Lebanon.

== Use of the term as a pejorative ==
In the West, particularly the United States, the term "Ayatollah" may be used as a pejorative to describe religious fundamentalism. Sam Miller of London Review of Books states that following the Iranian Revolution, "ayatollah" became common use; Miller described the pejorative version of the term as "[evoking] an old, turbaned, bearded man, sitting in judgment, looking like a crow and ordering the execution of the impure".

The term is generally used to describe any kind of fundamentalism, not just Islamism. For example, in the choice of title for the 1987 English translation of Raphael Mergui and Philippe Simonnot's book Israel's Ayatollahs: Meir Kahane and the Far Right in Israel, or in the United States, where former jurist and lawyer Roy Moore has been called the "Ayatollah of Alabama" by his critics due to espousing Christian nationalism, opposition to secularism, and far-right politics.

During the production of the film Heaven's Gate, the production crew referred to director Michael Cimino as an Ayatollah due to his demanding behavior.

== See also ==
- Akhoond
- Allamah
- Faqīh
- Mullah
- Sheikh
- Ulama
- Clericalism in Iran
- List of ayatollahs
- List of current maraji
- Seghatoleslam
- Mohyeddin
- Twelver Shia holy days
