= Al-Nafla =

Qatari cultural celebration

Al‑Nafla (Arabic: النافلة) is a traditional cultural celebration in Qatar, held annually on the 14th day of Sha'ban, just before the Islamic month of Ramadan begins. The occasion marks the approach of Ramadan and emphasizes charity (zakat), neighborliness and preparation for fasting.

== Origins and timing ==
The term nafla (Arabic: نافلة) refers to a voluntary act; in this context, it refers to a supplementary celebration of giving before Ramadan. The celebration is specifically held on 14th day of the Islamic month of Sha'ban, right before the last day of the month, signaling preparation for the coming month of fasting. The tradition is a long-established part of the folk heritage of Qatari neighborhoods.

== Customs and practices ==
During Al-Nafla, families prepare traditional Qatari dishes (such as harees, tharid, sago and asida) and share them with neighbors, relatives and the less-fortunate.

It is a tradition for children to dress in traditional clothes, sing folk songs (such as Yal-Nafla Ya Um El-Shaham Wil-laham), and carry baskets of nuts and candies around their neighborhoods, which are given out by households.

Most of the holiday's traditions emphasize generosity and is viewed as preparatory to the altruism expected during Ramadan.

== See also ==
- Gargee'an
