= May and Gilan =

May and Gilan (Arabic: مي و غيلان, romanized: Mayy wa Ḡīlān; also spelled Mai and Ghaylan) is a legend, or hikâya, originating from Qatar. In Qatari folklore, the tale of May and Ghilân has been celebrated as a foundational myth, often recounted through oral tradition. Ghilân, a prominent figure in Qatar's maritime history, is depicted by some as the progenitor of pearl fishing, the historical mainstay of Qatar's inhabitants.

== Story ==
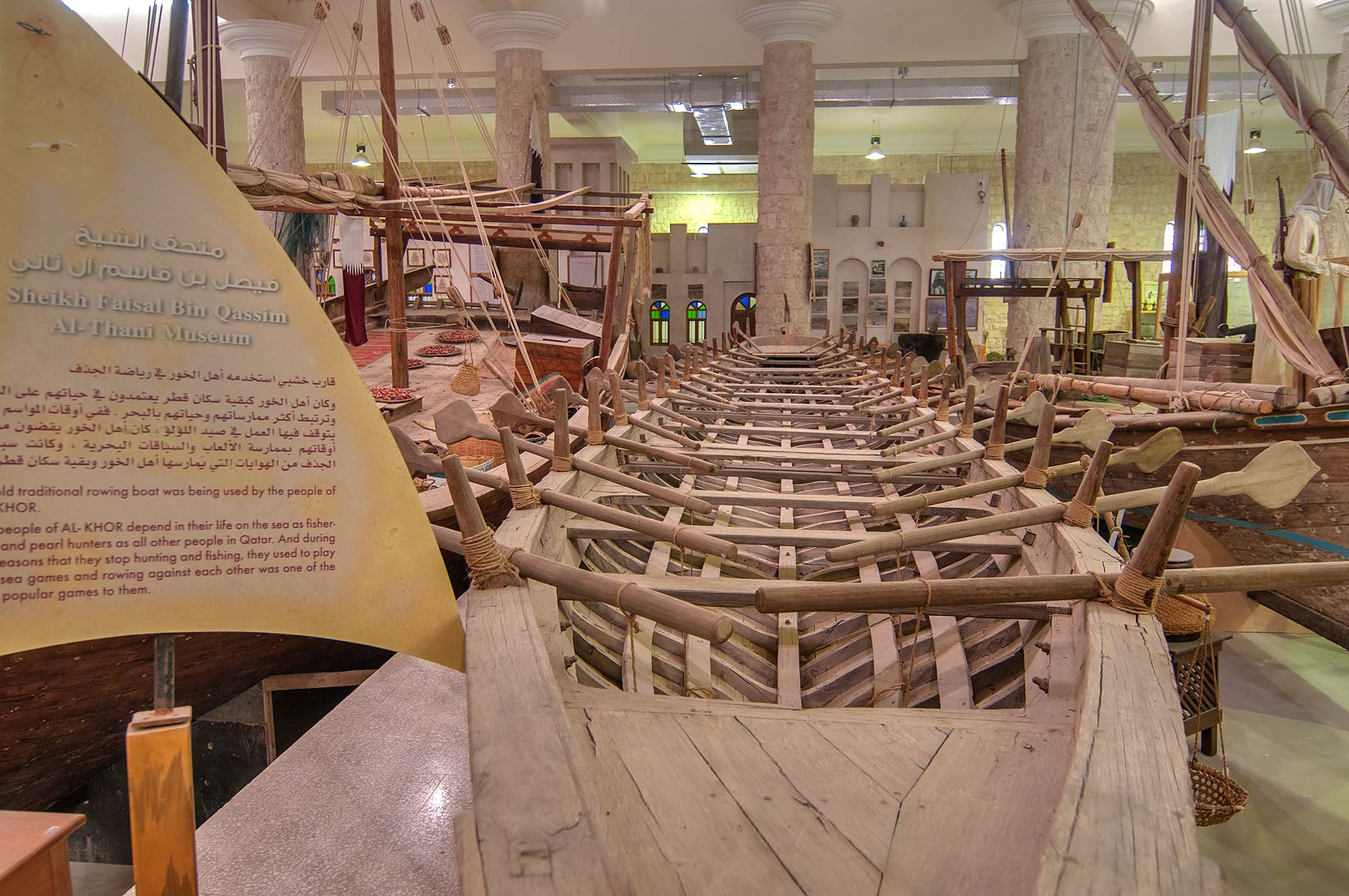
Traditional rowing boat used by the people of Al Khor on display in the Sheikh Faisal bin Qassim Al Thani Museum

=== Origins ===
According to oral tradition, the story originated from the Al Muhannadi tribe of Qatar's north-east coast who engaged in both maritime and pastoral livelihoods. It combines two principal themes: the competition between a man and a woman, and the invention of the boat sail.

=== Narrative ===
Set in the port of Khor Al Mahandah (present-day Al Khor), the story recounts that Ghilân, a wealthy and influential owner of pearling vessels, once dominated the local fleet. His supremacy was challenged when May, a woman with stronger and more experienced crews, began to rival him in reaching the pearl beds. On several occasions, her oar-powered boats outpaced his, prompting him to call out, "Tow us, O May!", to which she replied mockingly, "The towing is in the head of the oar".

Determined to regain his advantage, Ghilân is said to have drawn inspiration from the wings of a grasshopper, devising the idea of mounting sails on his boats. With the wind harnessed, his vessels soon outstripped May's. When she called out, "Tow us, O Ghilân!", he answered, "The towing is in the head of the mast". In the logic of the tale, this innovation both secured Ghilân's victory and reaffirmed a male predominance in an occupation historically closed off to women.

The narrative structure consists of five short episodes, punctuated by the repeated phrases about the oar and the mast. While the invention of the sail is the central motif, later retellings often remembered May and Ghilân simply as the initiators of pearl fishing itself. The story's circulation appears to have been largely confined to Al Khor, and by the late twentieth century it was already little known outside the town. Its decline has been attributed to the death of the older generation of pearl fishers and the absence of efforts to revive the tradition.

== Preservation ==
A written version of the legend is currently on display in the Al Khor Museum.

== Modern adaptations ==
Qatari playwright Abdulrahman Al Mannai made a theatrical adaptation of the legend in 2006 at the fifth edition of the Doha Cultural Festival hosted by the National Council for Culture, Arts and Heritage. The play took place at Qatar National Theatre. An operetta featuring traditional sea music and dances, over 120 performers took part in the play. Matar Ali and Fouad Al-Hariri composed and arranged the musical notes of the operetta, while Faisal Al-Tamimi directed the acting performances.

As part of a four-part series of animated shorts revolving around Qatar's folk heritage released by Qatar Museums in December 2023, the tale of May and Ghilan featured as the series' inaugural episode. It was produced by Sheikha Roda Al Thani.

== See also ==
- Qatari folklore
