= Twelver Shia holy days =

Twelver Shia Muslims commemorate significant events in the lives of their Imams throughout the year. These commemorations, known as ma'ātem, are observed according to the Islamic calendar. They include both joyous occasions, such as the birth anniversaries of Imams (Eid al-Melaad), and solemn events, such as the martyrdom anniversaries of Imams (Eid al-Gharib). The following is a list of these commemorations organized by Hijri month.

== Muharram ==
The first ten days of Muharram are marked by a series of commemorative rituals, observed as a period of mourning and reflection in remembrance of the martyrdom of Imam Hussein. During this period, Shia Muslims, including Twelvers and other Shia sects, commemorate the Battle of Karbala and the martyrdom of Imam Hussein and his companions. From the beginning of Muharram in the Hijri calendar, Shia communities engage in various rituals, such as wearing black attire, holding religious ceremonies, convening mourning councils in Husseiniyas or private homes, and participating in processions to express grief. Common mourning practices include weeping and chest-beating (Latm). These observances culminate on the tenth day, known as Ashura, which marks the peak of the mourning period.

Muharram 25 marks the anniversary of the martyrdom of the fourth Shia Imam, Ali ibn al-Hussein al-Sajjad, also known as Zayn al-Abidin. He is believed to have been killed by poisoning in the year 95 Hijri, according to one account, while another version places the event in the year 94 Hijri.

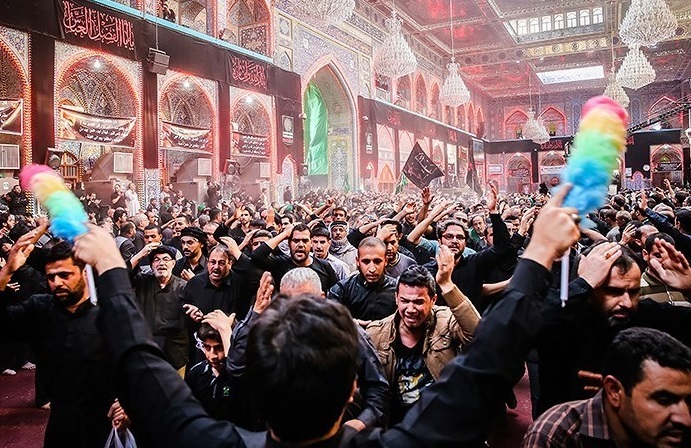
The Ashura ceremony in Karbala 2016.

== Safar ==
The 5th of Safar: marks the anniversary of the death of Ruqayya, the daughter of Imam al-Hussein, following the events of the Battle of Karbala. She died in Damascus.

The 7th of Safar marks the anniversary of the martyrdom of the second Shia Imam, Imam al-Hasan ibn Ali ibn Abi Talib. According to Shia belief, he was poisoned by his wife, Ja'dah bint al-Ash'ath, leading to his death.

The 17th day of Safar commemorates the martyrdom of the eighth Shia Imam, Ali al-Ridha. According to Shia tradition, he was poisoned by the Abbasid Caliph al-Ma'mun.

The 20th of Safar: This day marks the Arbaeeniyah of Imam Hussain, one of the most important occasions for Shia, and it is mentioned in their narrations that visiting Imam Hussein on Arbaeen is one of the signs of a believer.

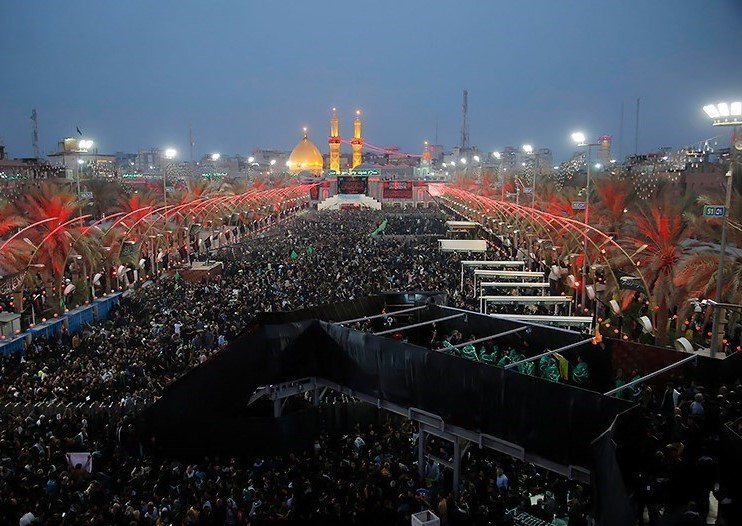
Arbaeen visitors at Bin al-Haramain, November 2017.

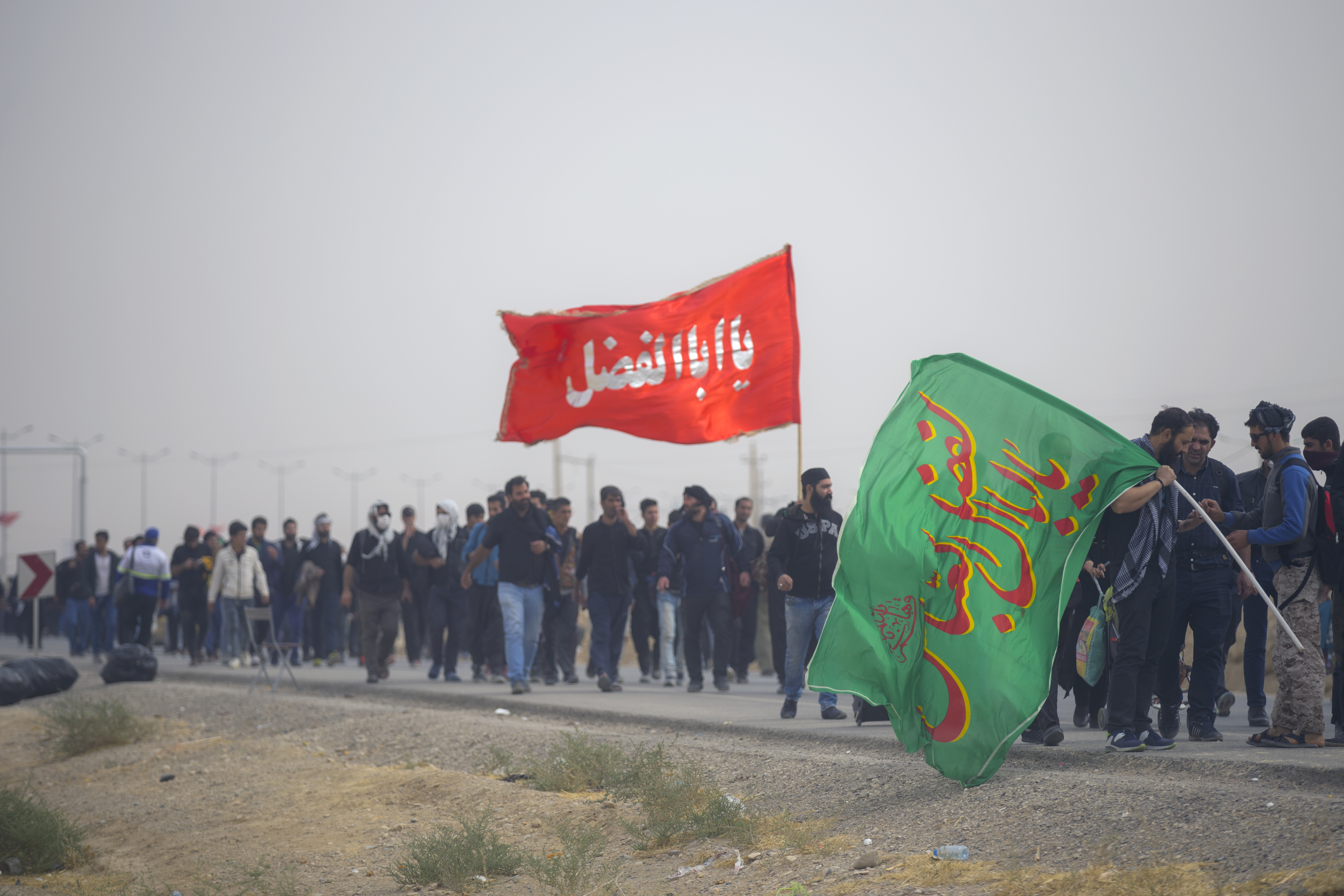
Arbaeen visitors on the walkway from Najaf to Karbala in 2016.

The 28th of Safar marks the anniversary of the death of Muhammad, according to Shia narratives. On this day, Twelver Shia mourn his passing.

The 30th of Safar marks the martyrdom of Imam Ali ibn Musa al-Ridha in the year 203 AH, as documented by historians such as al-Tabarsi and Ibn al-Athir.

== Rabi' al-Awwal ==
The 8th of Rabi' al-Awwal: The anniversary of the martyrdom of the eleventh Imam Hasan al-Askari, who was poisoned by al-Mu'adh al-Abbasi in the city of Samarra in 260 AH.

The 9th of Rabi' al-Awwal is known as the Day of the Joy of Zahra and is celebrated as a feast day by Twelver Shia Muslims. This day marks the coronation of Imam Mahdi, the twelfth Shia Imam, who is believed to have received the responsibilities of Imamate and Wilayat on this occasion.

The 17th of Rabi' al-Awwal marks the birth of Muhammad in Mecca at dawn on a Friday in the Year of the Elephant, according to Shia narratives. This day is observed as a day of fasting for Twelver Shia Muslims, followed by celebrations after breaking the fast to commemorate Muhammad's birth. Additionally, this date is significant as it also marks the birth of the sixth Imam, Ja'afar al-Sadiq, eighty-three years later.

== Rabi' al-Thani ==
The 8th of Rabi al-Thani marks the anniversary of the birth of Imam al-Hasan al-Askari, the eleventh Imam of the Twelver Shia, who was born in the year 232 AH.

10th Rabi' al-Thani: The anniversary of the death of Fatima al-Masoumeh, daughter of Imam al-Kadhim, in 201 AH.

== Jumada al-Awwal ==
The 5th of Jumada al-Awwal marks the birthday of Zainab bint Ali ibn Abi Talib.

The 13th, 14th, and 15th of Jumada al-Awwal are observed as the first Fatimiyya days among Shia communities. These days commemorate the martyrdom of Fatima Zahra, the daughter of Muhammad, and are designated as periods of mourning and reflection, observed annually.

== Jumada al-Thani ==
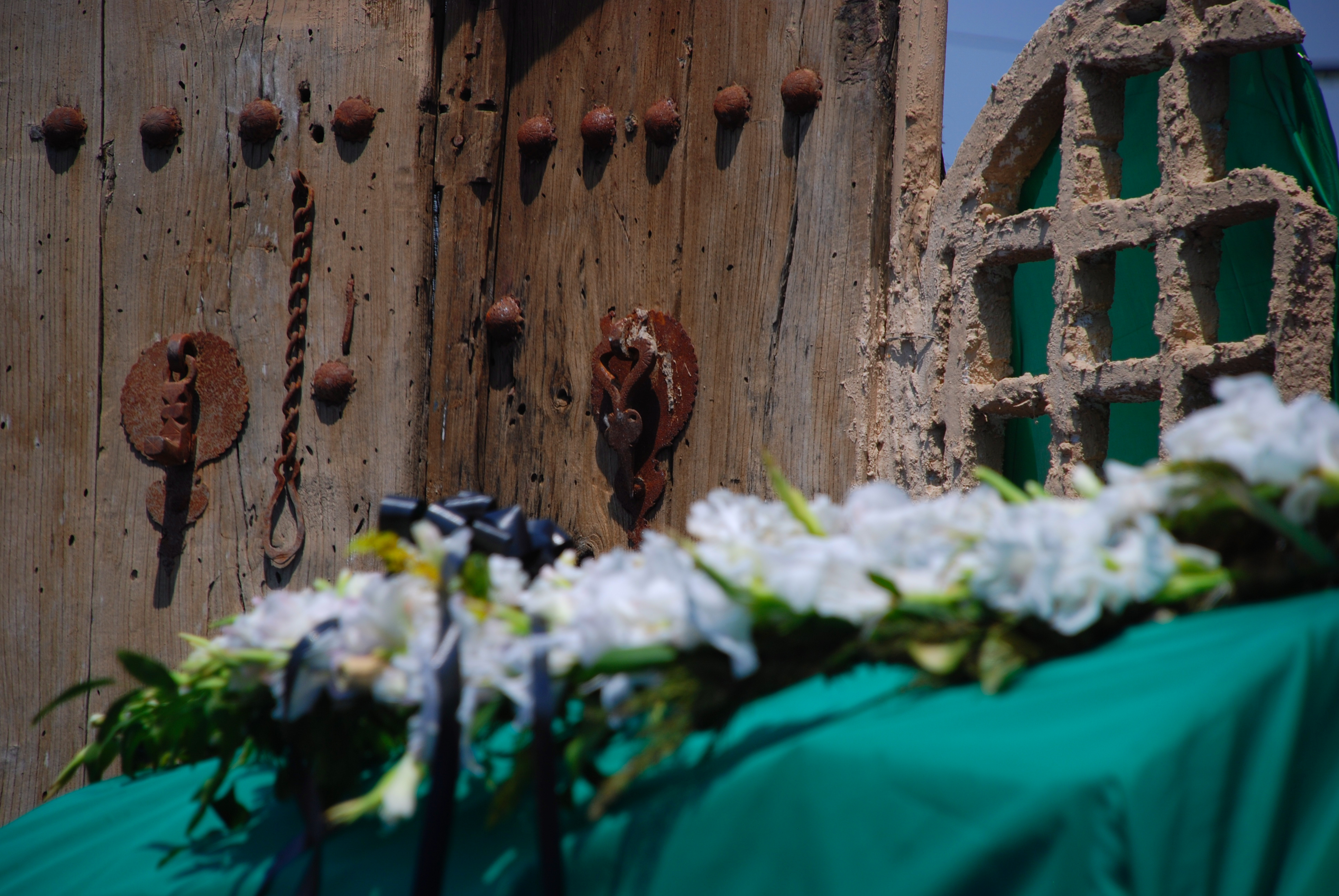
Fatima al-Zahra's house in Tehran's Fatimiyeh Ceremony

The 3rd of Jumada al-Thani marks the date on which Fatima Zahra, the daughter of Muhammad, died.

The 13th of Jumada al-Thani commemorates the anniversary of the passing of Fatima al-Kalabiya, also known as Umm al-Banin, the wife of Ali ibn Abi Talib, who died in the year 64 AH.

The 20th of Jumada al-Thani marks the anniversary of the birth of Fatima Zahra, which is believed to have occurred either in the second or fifth year of the Muhammad's mission. It is recommended for Muslims to observe fasting on this day.

== Rajab ==
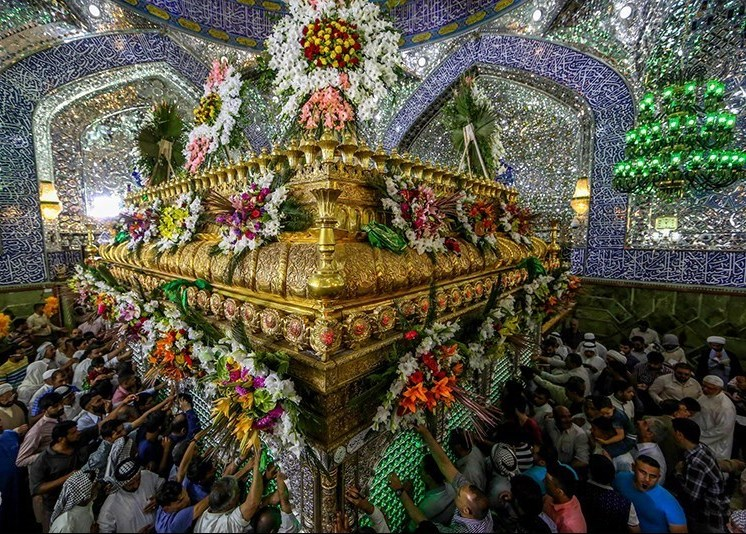
Decorating the mausoleum of Imam Ali bin Abi Talib with wreaths of natural roses on his birthday.

On the 3rd of Rajab, the tenth Imam, Ali al-Hadi, was poisoned in the year 254 AH in Samarra at the age of forty.

On the 10th of Rajab, Imam Muhammad al-Jawad, the ninth Shia Imam, was born in Medina in the year 195 AH.

The 13th, 14th, and 15th days of Rajab are designated as the White Days of Rajab. These days are associated with various virtuous actions, prayers, and Azkar(remembrance of God), and it is recommended that individuals perform i'tikaf (spiritual retreat) during this period. The 13th of Rajab commemorates the anniversary of the birth of the first Imam, Ali ibn Abi Talib, who was born in the year 30 of the Year of the Elephant in the sacred house of Allah. The 15th of Rajab is significant as it marks the anniversary of the death of Imam Ali's daughter, Zainab, in the year 63 AH, according to Shia narratives.

The 25th of Rajab marks the anniversary of the martyrdom of the seventh Shia Imam, Musa al-Kadhim. He was poisoned and died in the year 183 AH in Baghdad.

The 27th day of Rajab is known as the Feast of the Rebirth. According to Shia narratives, this day commemorates the event when God sent the Messenger of Allah, Muhammad.

== Sha'ban ==
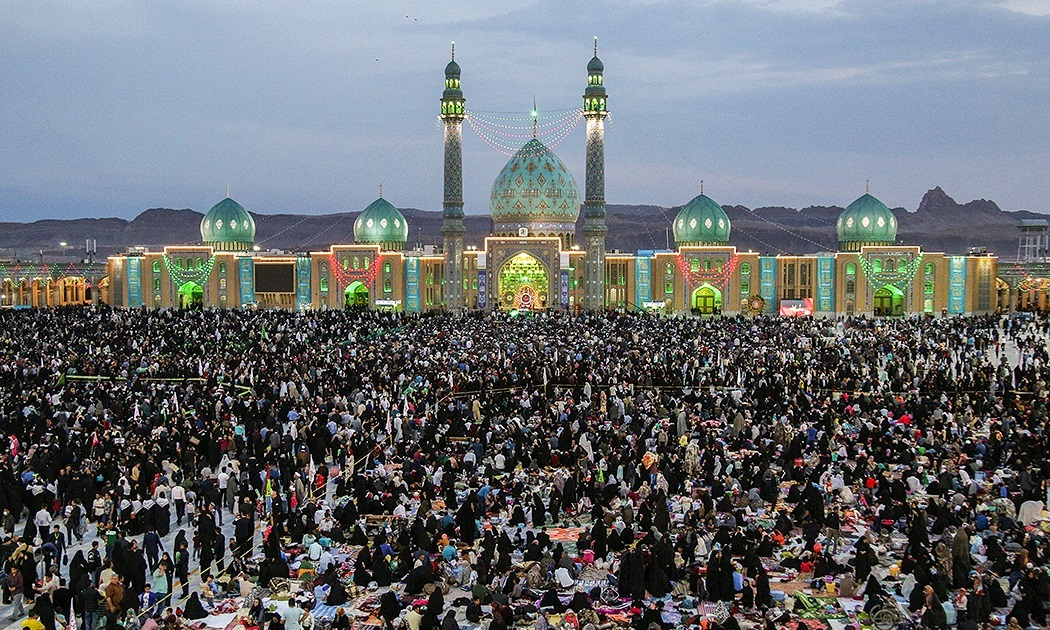
Half of Sha'ban celebration at Jamkaran Mosque in 1439.

The month of births is a significant period in the Shia calendar, during which festivities and commemorations are held to honor the occasions of various Shia births:

- The 3rd of Sha'ban marks the birth of the third Imam, Hussein ibn Ali, the grandson of Muhammad, in the fourth year of the Hijra.
- The 4th of Sha'ban marks the birth of Abu al-Fadl, also known as Al-Abbas ibn Ali ibn Abi Talib, who was born in the 28th year of the Hijra.
- The 5th of Sha'ban marks the birth of Imam Ali Zayn al-Abidin, the fourth Shia Imam, who was born in Medina in the year 38 AH.
- The 11th of Sha'ban marks the birth of Ali ibn al-Hussein al-Akbar, who was born in the 33rd year of the Hijra.
- The 15th of Sha'ban, known as Gargee'an, marks the birth of Imam Muhammad ibn al-Hasan al-Mahdi, the twelfth and final Shia Imam, in the year 555 AD. On this day and its preceding night, it is reported that fasting and prayers are recommended.

== Ramadan ==
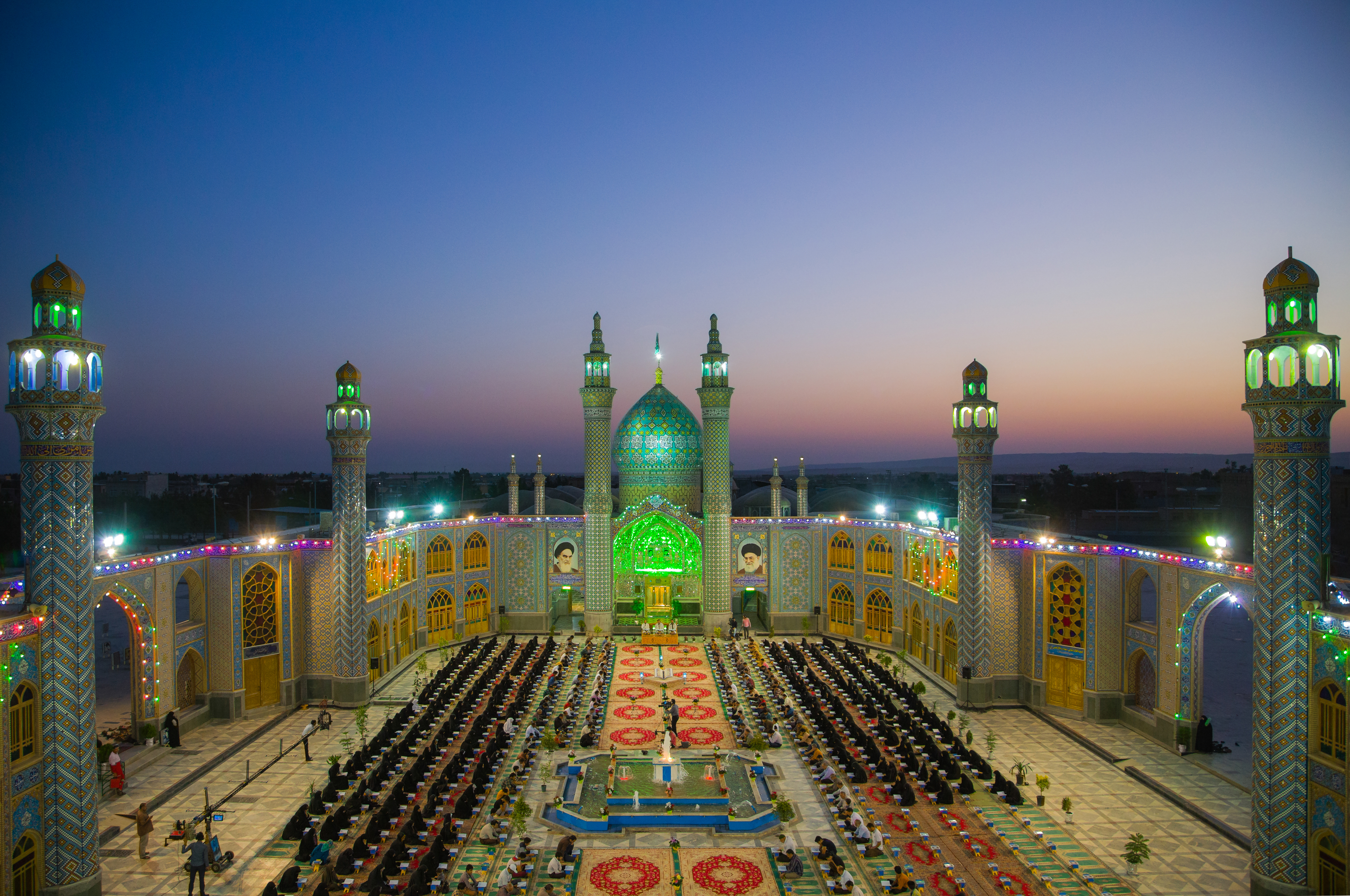
Ramadan Qur'anic recital at the shrine of Muhammad al-Awsat ibn Ali ibn Ali in Aran o Bidgol.

The 10th day of Ramadan marks the passing of Khadija bint Khuwaylid, the wife of Muhammad.

The 15th of Ramadan, known as Gargee'an, marks the birth of Imam al-Hasan al-Mujtaba, the grandson of Muhammad, who was born in the third year of the Hijrah.

The 19th night of Ramadan is regarded as the first night of al-Qadr, marking the commencement of the nightly revelation of divine decrees. This night is also significant as it commemorates the wounding of Amir al-Mu'minin Ali ibn Abi Talib by Ibn Muljam in the year 40 AH.

The 21st day of Ramadan is recognized as the second night of the Night of Qadr. This date also commemorates the martyrdom of Ali ibn Abi Talib in the year 40 AH.

The 23rd of Ramadan marks the third night of Qadr, which is the night of the revelation of the Quran to Muhammad according to their narrative.

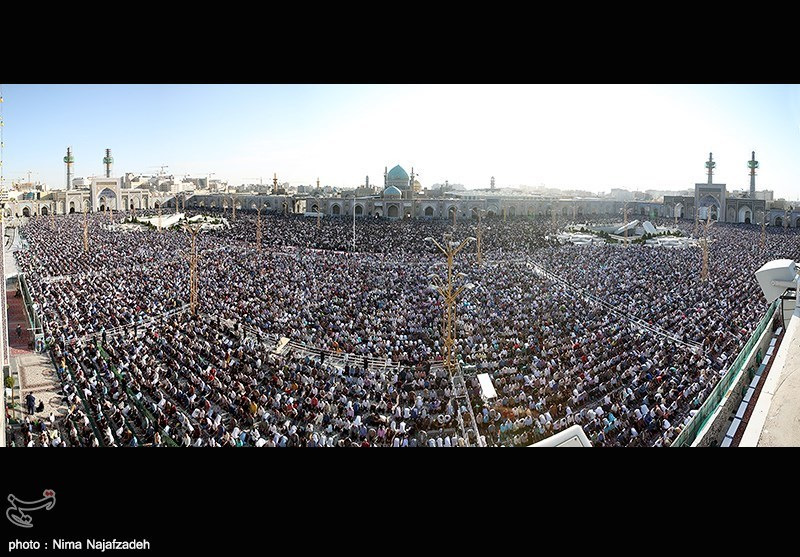
Decorating the shrine of Imam Reza on the occasion of his birth anniversary.

== Shawwal ==
The 1st of Shawwal marks the day of Eid al-Fitr, an Islamic holiday celebrated by Muslims that occurs immediately following the fasting month of Ramadan. On this day, fasting is prohibited.

The 8th of Shawwal marks the anniversary of the demolition of the shrines of the Imams in Baqe'a by the Wahhabis in the year 1344 AH.

The 25th of Shawwal marks the martyrdom of Imam Ja'far al-Sadiq, the leader of the Shia sect, who died in 148 AH. He was poisoned during the reign of the Abbasid Caliph al-Mansur al-Duwaniqi.

== Dhu al-Qadah ==
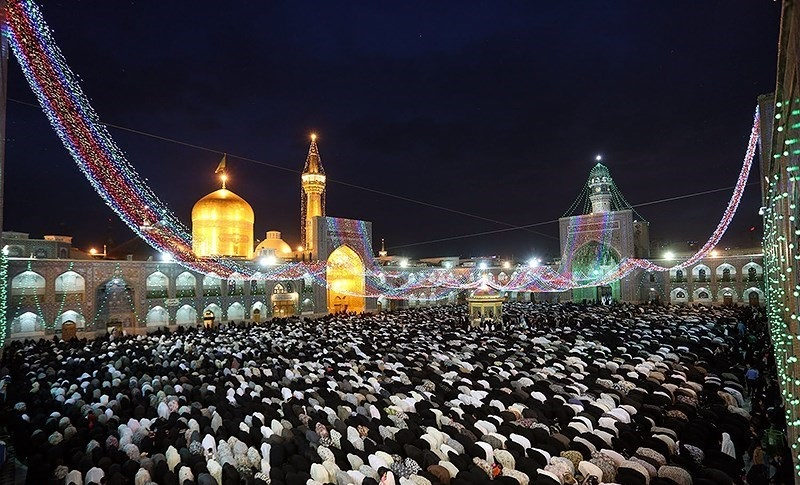
Decorating the shrine of Imam Reza on the occasion of his birth anniversary.

The 1st of Dhu al-Qa'dah marks the birth of Fatima al-Masumah, the daughter of Imam al-Kadhim, in the year 173 AH.

The 11th of Dhu al-Qa'dah marks the birth of Imam al-Ridha, the eighth Shia Imam, who was born in Medina in the year 148 AH.

The 25th of Dhu al-Qa'dah, according to Shia narrations, is the day on which the earth was destroyed, and God stretched it out from under the Kaaba over the water.

The 30th of Dhu al-Qa'dah marks the passing of Imam Muhammad al-Jawad, who died at the age of 25 due to poisoning by Caliph al-Mu'tasim.

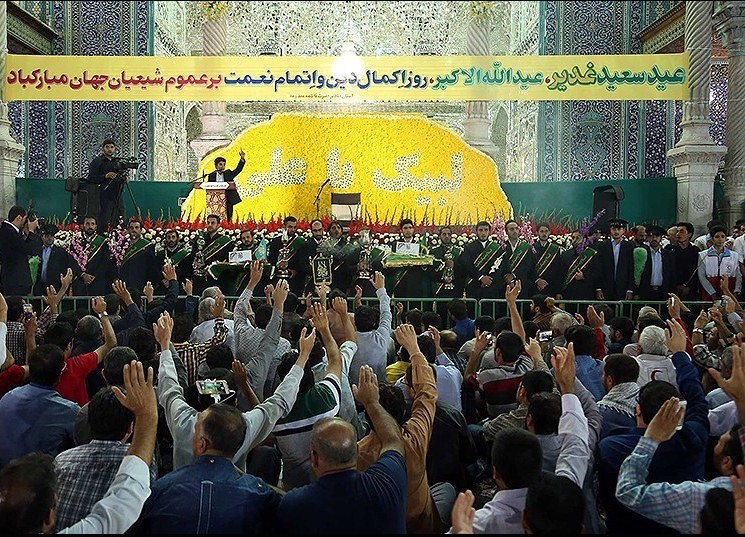
Celebrating Eid al-Ghadir at the shrine of Shah Abdul Azim al-Hasani.

== Dhu al-Hijjah ==
The 1st of Dhu al-Hijjah marks the anniversary of the marriage of Imam Ali to Fatima Zahra, which took place in the first year of the Hijrah.

The 7th of Dhu al-Hijjah marks the martyrdom of Imam Muhammad ibn Ali al-Baqir, which occurred in the year 114 AH.

The 9th of Dhu al-Hijjah is a day of the Hajj, during which pilgrims gather at Mount Arafat. Standing on Arafat is regarded as the most important pillar of the Hajj. For those unable to undertake the pilgrimage, it is recommended to visit Hussein ibn Ali on this day, which is also observed as a day of fasting and prayer.

The 10th day of Dhu al-Hijjah marks the conclusion of the Hajj pilgrimage and is commonly known as Eid al-Adha.

The 15th of Dhu al-Hijjah marks the birth of Imam Ali al-Hadi, who was born in the year 212 AH in Medina.

The 18th of Dhu al-Hijjah, known as Eid al-Ghadir, is a festival in the Shia tradition, also referred to as Eid al-Wilayah and Eid al-Kamal al-Din, translating to the Feast of the Completion of Religion and the Completion of Grace. This day commemorates the event in the tenth year of the Hijrah when, while returning to Medina from the farewell pilgrimage, Muhammad ordered a stop at a location called Ghadir Kham, where he delivered important commandments to the Muslims.
