= Umm Khalaf =

Qatari writer and television presenter

Umm Khalaf (Arabic: أم خلف; born 1952), also known by her birth name Moza Rashid Al Badr, is a Qatari storyteller, television presenter, writer, educator and researcher, best known for her efforts in preserving Qatar's heritage through her various media appearances.

== Career ==
=== Education ===
After graduating from Dar Al-Muallimeen, she was hired by the Ministry of Education to work in the educational sector in Qatar, remaining in the industry for over 30 years. She worked as a teacher and later as a school principal. She is credited with introducing traditional Qatari games and stories into the school curriculum, making cultural education an integral part of her teaching. Furthermore, she introduced and presented heritage-focused segments during morning assemblies in Qatari schools.

Positions held at the Ministry of Education by Umm Khalaf include Head of the Model Education Department. In 2008, during her tenure, there were 5,867 students enrolled in model schools, with the current number of such schools in Qatar totaling 17. During this role, she oversaw the implementation of an ethical charter in model schools. She was later appointed Head of Physical Education Curricula, where in 2019, she led an initiative launched by the Ministry of Education that focuses on promoting excellence in physical education within model and primary schools for boys in Qatar. The initiative includes various programs and activities, organized in cooperation with external parties, to develop the physical education curriculum.

=== Folklore ===
One of the best-known storytellers Qatar has produced, her passion for storytelling began in her childhood when she would listen to her mother's tales under the starry skies, a common practice before the advent of modern entertainment. This early exposure to oral traditions motivated her to dedicate much of her career to preserving and sharing Qatari heritage.

Among the topics she has researched and presented include pearl diving, the history of education, folk medicine, Ramadan customs, and other historical traditions. Some of the popular tales she has narrated include Al Fisaikra and The Jealous Wife. In 2016, she was a participant at the Sharjah International Narrator Forum, where she narrated folk stories and songs.

=== Television ===
Additionally, she collaborated with Al Jazeera Children's Channel, recording a three-episode series that brought Qatari folk culture to a wider audience. The series was filmed at her private estate, which included a museum and farm. She also contributed to children's programming on Qatar TV, providing educational content about traditional practices and hosting the channel's Fi Al Saha program for 6 months. She hosted the program Suwalif Umm Khalaf, broadcast on Qatar TV's sister channel Qatar 2, in which she narrated folkstories.

In 2011, she was one of the main experts interviewed in the short documentary film Qatar: The Future, presented as part of Qatar National Day. Historical customs and practices are discussed by Umm Khalaf in the documentary. In 2012, she appeared in a short film about the traditional holiday of Garangao produced by the Doha Film Institute.

An animated series produced by Qatari graduates specializing in animation, Umm Khalaf and Her Daughters, featured her as the main character, a storyteller who shares tales and cultural wisdom. This project aimed to engage younger generations with their cultural heritage through educational content.

=== Other fields ===
She was a familiar voice on Qatari radio, contributing to the success of various heritage programs. She has also written for various magazines.

== Personal life ==
Umm Khalaf was born in the coastal town of Al Thakhira. Her father, a merchant with businesses in Doha and Mesaieed, ensured she received an education, a rare opportunity for women at the time, supported by the Qatari government's initiatives to encourage female education in the 1950s. She is a mother of eight.
