= Urban Qatari Arabic =

Dialect of Arabic spoken in Qatar

- العربية القطرية المدنية
- Native to: Qatar
- Language family: Afro-Asiatic: Semitic; West Semitic; Central Semitic; Arabic; Peninsular; Gulf; Urban Qatari Arabic
- Writing system: Arabic alphabet

Language codes
- ISO 639-3: –
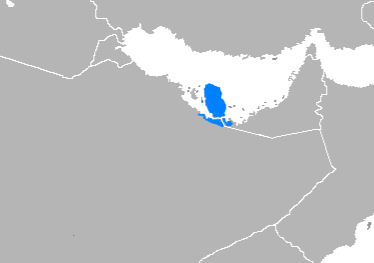

Urban Qatari Arabic (Arabic: العربية القطرية المدنية, romanized: al-ʻarabiyyah al-qaṭariyyah al-madaniyya) is a variety of Gulf Arabic spoken in Qatar, and considered the prestige dialect within the nation.

The vocabulary of Urban Qatari Arabic incorporates a plethora of loanwords from Aramaic, Persian, Turkish, and more recently, English. Urban Qatari Arabic exhibits features that align with other Gulf dialects, but with unique adaptations.

== Variations ==
A South Asian pidgin form of Urban Qatari Arabic has emerged in modern times.

As English is considered the prestige lingua franca in Qatar, bilingual locals have incorporated several elements of English into Urban Qatari Arabic when communicating on an informal level. This mixture of English terms and phrases in Urban Qatari Arabic speech is colloquially known as Qatarese. The practice of interchanging English and Arabic words can be characterized as code-mixing, and is mostly seen in urban areas and among the younger generation.

== Relation with other dialects in Qatar ==
In Doha, the capital of Qatar, the local populace is primarily divided into two groups: bedouins, known for their traditional nomadic lifestyle and speaking Najdi Arabic, and hadaris, who are urban dwellers and speak the Urban Qatari dialect. There is a noticeable trend among the younger bedouins in Doha and other towns like Al Khor to adopt urban linguistic features. This phenomenon, often referred to as 'hadarization', involves incorporating urban phonetic and semantic elements into their speech. Examples include the preference for the glide /j/ over the bedouin voiced affricate /d͡ʒ/ pronouncing, for instance, /rajːal/ instead of /rad͡ʒːal/.

This shift towards hadari dialect features is a social adaptation driven by the higher status associated with urban dialects. Many bedouins are attempting to align with the cosmopolitan, educated, and sophisticated lifestyle epitomized by Qatar’s royal family, which itself is originally of Najdi ancestry, but speaks the prestige hadari dialect.

== Phonology ==
The phonology of Urban Qatari Arabic shares many characteristics with other Gulf Arabic dialects, though it exhibits specific features regarding vowel inventory, allophony, and stress assignment that distinguish it from neighboring varieties.

=== Vowels ===
The vowel inventory of Urban Qatari Arabic has been analyzed as consisting of five long vowels and two short vowels, a system that differs from the three-short-vowel system traditionally described for Gulf Arabic.

==== Long vowels ====
The dialect possesses five phonemic long vowels: /iː/, /uː/, /eː/, /oː/, and /aː/ (often transcribed as ī, ū, ē, ō, ā). The long mid-vowels /eː/ and /oː/ are generally monophthongized reflexes of the Classical Arabic diphthongs *ay and *aw, although these diphthongs may be retained in specific morphological contexts or phrase-final positions.

==== Short vowels ====
While many studies of Gulf Arabic posit three short vowels (/a/, /i/, /u/), acoustic analysis of Urban Qatari Arabic suggests a two-vowel system consisting of /a/ and /i/. In this analysis, the high back rounded vowel /u/ is treated as a conditioned allophone of /i/ rather than a distinct phoneme. The realization of these short vowels is heavily influenced by phonological environment:

The vowel /i/ is realized as /u/ primarily in the presence of labial or emphatic consonants, which induce backing and rounding.

Short vowels tend to be central or fronted in the environment of alveolar consonants.

==== Final vowel raising (Imāla) ====
Urban Qatari Arabic exhibits word-final vowel raising, a phenomenon known as imāla and found in many varieties of Arabic, where the feminine singular suffix /-a/ is raised to /e/ or /i/. Unlike other Arabic varieties where this raising is typically conditioned by adjacent consonants, in Urban Qatari Arabic, the raising is largely conditioned by the height of the preceding vowel (vowel harmony). For example, the raising is suppressed if the preceding vowel is low, but occurs if the preceding vowel is high, even if emphatic consonants are present in the stem, though the resulting vowel may be backed.

=== Epenthesis ===
Epenthesis (the insertion of a vowel to break up consonant clusters) is a regular feature of the dialect. It typically occurs to resolve clusters that arise from morphology or word boundaries. The quality of the epenthetic vowel is generally high, and while it is often distinct from lexical vowels in duration and intensity, it interacts with stress assignment. For some speakers, epenthetic vowels can receive stress, while for others, they remain unstressed, suggesting variable ordering of epenthesis and stress rules.

== Lexicon ==
The vocabulary of Urban Qatari Arabic reflects the centuries of trade, migration, and cultural exchange that occurred in the peninsula. This is evident in the presence of loanwords from Aramaic, Persian, Turkish, Portuguese, and even more recent borrowings from English. Aramaic loanwords are remnants of the pre-Islamic era, found mostly in religious, agricultural, and trade-related terms. Prior to the arrival of Islam around 628, Qatar was the center of an Aramaic-speaking region known as Beth Qatraye. The language spoken in this region, known as Qatrayith, was mainly Aramaic with some Persian and Arabic loanwords, and has been categorized as 'Southeastern Aramaic'. Turkish influence was seen from the 16th century onwards due to the presence of the Ottoman Empire in the Arabian Peninsula.
