= Philippe Simonnot =

French economist and journalist (1941–2022)

- Born: 10 July 1941; Boulogne-Billancourt, German-occupied France
- Died: 17 November 2022 (aged 81)
- Education: University of Aix-Marseille
- Occupations: Economist; Journalist

Philippe Simonnot (French: [filip simɔno]; 10 July 1941 – 17 November 2022) was a French economist and journalist.

Simonnot earned a doctorate in economic sciences from the University of Aix-Marseille and was the author of numerous books on economics. He occasionally published chronicles in the press, such as in Le Figaro and Le Monde.

Simonnot died on 17 November 2022, at the age of 81.

== Journalist ==
Simonnot was an economic journalist specializing on the oil market for Le Monde, where he published an article on the Elf Aquitaine in 1976. The article led him to be fired, about which he published a book on the functions of the newspaper's director Jacques Fauvet and, more broadly, the entire profession of journalism, titled Le Monde et le pouvoir.

In 1988, while working as an economic journalist for the weekly news magazine Politis, he developed a theory in which Homo sportivus was replaced by Homo economicus.

== Economist ==
Simonnot closely researched monetary issues. Faced with the crises of the end of the Bretton Woods system and the introduction of floating exchange rates, he advocated for the return to a precious metal backing of the US dollar or the euro. He strongly criticized government and favored the physiocrats. He directed the Observatoire économique de la Méditerranée and the Atelier de l'économie contemporaine, as well as the monetary seminar of the liberal think tank Institut Turgot.

== Awards ==
- Prix Rossi (2002)
- Prix du livre libéral (2003)

== Books ==
- L'Avenir du système monétaire (1972)
- Clefs pour le pouvoir monétaire (1973)
- Le Complot pétrolier : du rapport Schvartz à la dénationalisation d'ELF (1976)
- Les Nucléocrates (1978)
- Banquiers, votre argent nous intéresse (1979)
- Mémoire adressé à Monsieur le Premier Ministre sur la guerre, l'économie et les autres passions humaines qu'il s'agit de gouverner (1981)
- Le Grand Bluff économique des socialistes (1982)
- Le Sexe et l'économie ou la Monnaie des sentiments (1985)
- Homo sportivus : sport, capitalisme et religion (1988)
- Le Secret de l'armistice : 1940 (1990)
- Doll'art (1990)
- 39 leçons d'économie contemporaine (1998)
- Mitterrand et les patrons, 1981-1986 (1999)
- Juifs et Allemands : Pré-Histoire d'un génocide (1999)
- Vingt et un siècles d'économie : en vingt et une dates-clés (2002)
- Économie du droit, tome 1 : L'Invention de l'État (2003)
- L'Erreur économique : Comment économistes et politiques se trompent et nous trompent (2003)
- Les Papes, l'Église et l'argent : histoire économique du christianisme des origines à nos jours (2005)
- Le marché de Dieu : L'économie des religions monothéistes (2008)
- Enquête sur l’antisémitisme musulman. De ses origines à nos jours (2010)
- Le Jour où la France sortira de l’Euro (2010)
- Delenda America (2011)
- La Monnaie, histoire d’une imposture (2012)
- Chômeurs ou esclaves : Le dilemme français (2013)
- Non, l'Allemagne n'était pas coupable (2014)
- Le Rose et le Brun. Quel a été le rôle des homosexuels dans la montée du nazisme au pouvoir ? (2015)
- Nouvelles leçons d'économie contemporaine (2018)
- Le Siècle Balfour : 1917-2017 (2018)
