= Gargee'an =

Semiannual celebration in Eastern Arabia

Gargee'an (Arabic: قرقيعان), sometimes spelled as Gerga'oon (Arabic: قرقاعون), is a semiannual celebration, observed primarily in Eastern Arabia. It takes place on the 13th, 14th or 15th night of the Islamic month of Ramadan. It is celebrated by children and adults alike dressing in traditional attire and going door-to-door to receive sweets and nuts from neighbours, as they sing traditional songs. This traditional holiday is celebrated by both Sunni and Shia. The tradition has existed for hundreds of years, and is deeply rooted in some parts of the Persian Gulf culture, especially in (Qatif and Al-Ahsa of Saudi Arabia), Iraq, Kuwait, Bahrain and Qatar.

== Etymology and alternative names ==
The exact origin of the word Qarqī'ān is unknown though several theories exist. One states that it is derived from Qarqa'ah (Arabic: قرقعة “click”, “snick”), referring to the sound of iron pots carrying the sweets hitting each other while serving the sweets.

The holiday is known by other names in the wider Arab world: Majeena or Garangao in Iraq.

== Religious significance ==
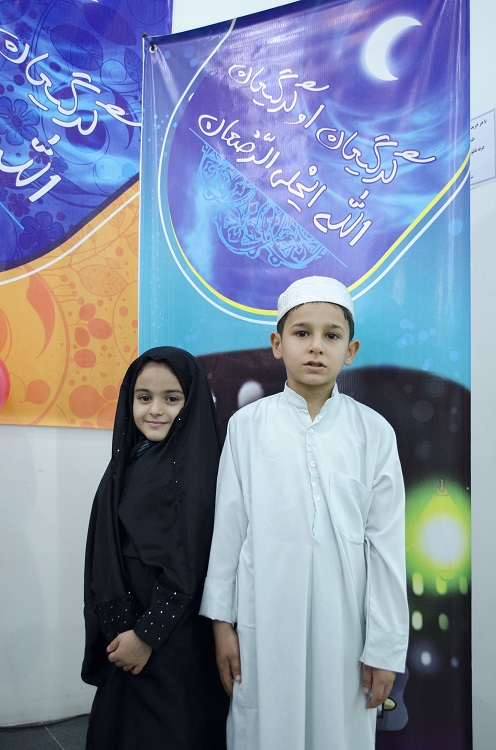
Children dressed for Gargee'an celebrations in Contemporary Arts Museum of Ahwaz.

The celebration of قرنقعو (قرقيعان) is a cultural tradition in the Persian Gulf, Iraq and south Iran. Shi'i Muslims associate it with the birth of the Imam Hasan ibn Ali, who was born in mid-Ramadan.

== Tradition ==
Children gather in small choir groups in front of a home and sing. The song is intended to ask God to bless the youngest child of the family with health, and that the mother will remain happy. The more they sing, the more nuts and sweets they receive. The Garqee'an tradition is intended to spread love, happiness and affection among adults and children.

In modern times, supermarkets, corporations, and malls compete to attract children during this time via advertisements, and by offering special promotions and arranging exclusive Qarqee'an events to market themselves.

== See also ==
- Culture of Eastern Arabia
- Culture of Bahrain
- Culture of Kuwait
