= Abdullah bin Hamad al-Attiyah =

Qatari politician (1952–2026)

Abdullah Bin Hamad al-Attiyah
- عبد الله بن حمد العطية
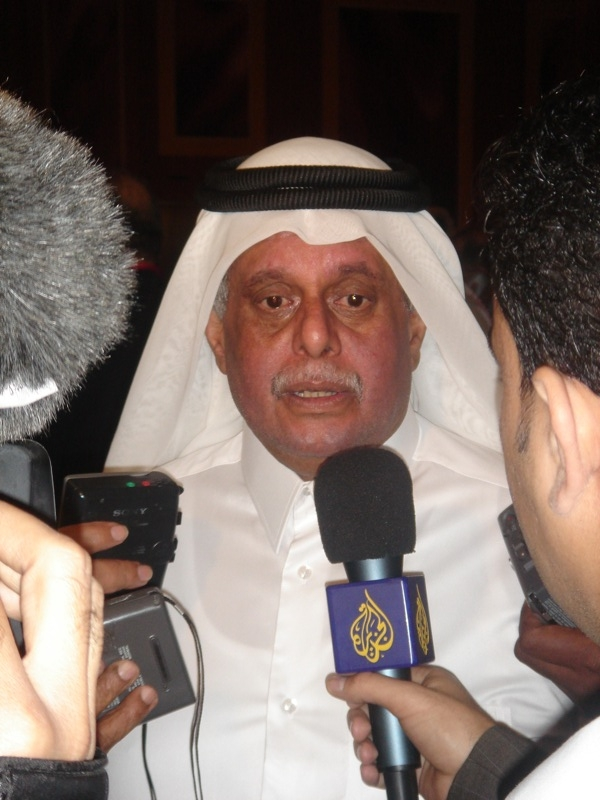
- al-Attiyah in 2006

Deputy Prime Minister of Qatar
- In office 3 April 2007 – 18 January 2011
- Monarch: Hamad bin Khalifa
- Prime Minister: Hamad bin Jassim
- Preceded by: Hamad bin Jassim
- Succeeded by: Ahmad bin Abdullah Al Mahmoud

Second Deputy Prime Minister of Qatar
- In office 2003–2007
- Monarch: Hamad bin Khalifa Al Thani
- Preceded by: Mohammed bin Khalifa Al Thani

Minister of Industry and Energy
- In office 12 January 1999 – 18 January 2011
- Monarch: Hamad bin Khalifa
- Prime Minister: Abdullah bin Khalifa; Hamad bin Jassim
- Preceded by: Khalid bin Hamad
- Succeeded by: Mohammed Saleh Al Sada
- In office 28 March 1992 – 19 February 1995
- Prime Minister: Khalifa bin Hamad
- Preceded by: Jassim bin Hamad
- Succeeded by: Khalid bin Hamad

Personal details
- Born: 1952 Doha, Qatar
- Died: 27 May 2026 (aged 73)
- Children: 6

Abdullah bin Hamad al-Attiyah (/əbˈdʌlə bɪn ˈhɑːməd æl ˈɑːtiːjə/ əb-DUL-ə bin HAH-məd al AH-tee-yə; Arabic: عبد الله بن حمد العطية, 1952 – 27 May 2026) was a Qatari politician who was deputy prime minister and the head of the emir's court. From September 1992 to January 2011, al-Attiyah was Qatar's minister of energy and industry.

Al-Attiyah owned the Gulf Publishing and Printing Company, which is the media house behind two central Qatari newspapers: Al Raya and Gulf Times.

== Early life and education ==
Al-Attiyah was born in Doha, Qatar in 1952. In 1976, he graduated from the University of Alexandria, Egypt with a bachelor's degree.

== Career ==
=== Politics ===
Al-Attiyah started his career in 1972 with the ministry of finance and petroleum of Qatar. From 1973 to 1986, he held a post of the head of international and public relations at the ministry. From 1986 to 1989, he served as the director of the office of the minister, and from 1989 to 1992, as the director of the office of the minister of interior and as the acting minister of finance and petroleum.

On 23 November 1993, al-Attiyah was named OPEC president and a member of the OPEC's quota compliance committee.

On 12 January 1999, he also assumed the responsibility for electricity and water issues as these sectors were merged into the ministry of energy and industry. On 16 September 2003 he was appointed second deputy prime minister and on 3 April 2007, deputy prime minister.

In December 2003, he chaired the OPEC's annual conference in Vienna, Austria, and served as head of Qatar's delegation.

On 30 June 2009, at the eighth ministerial meeting of the Gas Exporting Countries Forum in Doha, al-Attiyah was elected as the chairman of the organization. Although Gas Exporting Countries Forum has seen by some experts as an attempt to form 'gas-OPEC', al-Attiyah ruled out a creation of OPEC-like cartel.

On 18 January 2011 he was named head of the Amiri Diwan while remaining in the post of the deputy prime minister. In the post of minister of industry and energy he was replaced by Mohammed Saleh Al Sada.

In 2011, al-Attiyah was appointed head of Emir Hamad Al Thani's office and president of the Qatar Administrative Control and Transparency Authority.

During the 2012 United Nations Climate Change Conference in Doha, al-Attiyah served as the chairman.

=== Business ===
From 1975, al-Attiyah was the director of the Gulf Helicopters Corporation. From 1987 to 1995, he served as the deputy chairman of QTel. From 1986 on, he was a member of the directors board of Gulf Airways Corporation.

In 1992, al-Attiyah was appointed chairman and managing director of Qatar Petroleum. Al-Attiyah was also the President of the Board of Trustees of the Lebanese School of Qatar.

=== Media ===
Al-Attiyah owned the Gulf Publishing and Printing Company, which is the media house behind two central Qatari newspapers: Al Raya and Gulf Times. Their content is "widely viewed as aligned with government policy", and they avoid criticizing Qatari authorities.

=== Philanthropy ===
Al-Attiyah was chairman of the board of trustees of the Abdullah bin Hamad Al Attiyah International Foundation for Energy and Sustainable Development.

== Personal life and death ==
Attiyah was married and had six children. His interests included reading, fishing, and radio communications. His amateur radio call-sign was A71AU.

Attiyah died on 27 May 2026, at the age of 73.

== Awards ==
In 2007, the London-based British Petroleum Intelligence Bulletin chose al-Attiyah as the Man of the Year in the field of development of hydrocarbon industry.

In 2011, Texas A&M University awarded al-Attiyah an Honorary Degree.
