= Khalid bin Mohammad al-Attiyah =

Qatari politician (born 1967)

His Excellency Khalid bin Mohammad al-Attiyah
- خالد بن محمد العطية
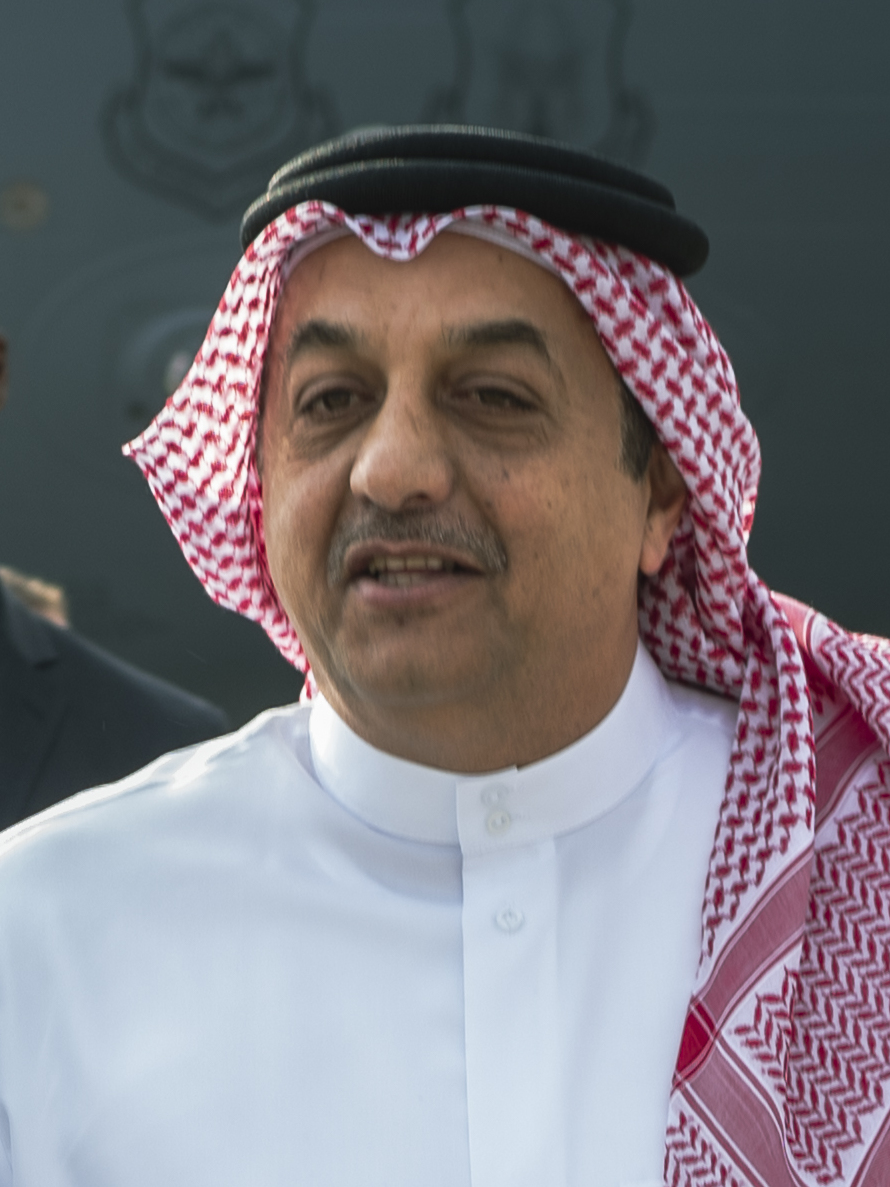
- Al Attiyah in 2023

Deputy Prime Minister of Qatar
- In office 15 November 2017 – 12 November 2024
- Monarch: Tamim bin Hamad Al Thani
- Prime Minister: Abdullah bin Nasser Al Thani; Khalid bin Khalifa Al Thani
- Preceded by: Ahmad bin Abdullah Al Mahmoud
- Succeeded by: Saoud bin Abdulrahman Al Thani

Minister of State for Defence Affairs
- In office 27 January 2016 – 12 November 2024
- Monarch: Tamim bin Hamad Al Thani
- Preceded by: Hamad bin Ali Attiyah
- Succeeded by: Saoud bin Abdulrahman Al Thani

Minister of Foreign Affairs
- In office 26 June 2013 – 27 January 2016
- Monarch: Tamim bin Hamad Al Thani
- Prime Minister: Abdullah bin Nasser Al Thani
- Preceded by: Hamad bin Jassim Al Thani
- Succeeded by: Mohammed bin Abdulrahman Al Thani

Minister of State for Foreign Affairs
- In office 1 September 2011 – 26 June 2013
- Monarch: Hamad bin Khalifa Al Thani
- Prime Minister: Hamad bin Jassim Al Thani
- Preceded by: Ahmad bin Abdullah Al Mahmoud
- Succeeded by: Office abolished

Personal details
- Born: 9 March 1967 (age 59) Doha, Qatar
- Education: King Faisal Air Academy; Beirut Arab University; Cairo University

Military service
- Allegiance: Qatar
- Branch/service: Qatar Air Force
- Years of service: 1987–1995

Khalid bin Mohammad al-Attiyah (Arabic: خالد بن محمد العطية; born 9 March 1967) is a Qatari politician who was minister of foreign affairs from June 2013 to January 2016. He had been Deputy Prime Minister and Minister of State for Defense Affairs between January 2016 and 12 November 2024.

== Early life and education ==
Al-Attiyah was born on 9 March 1967. His family belongs to the Banu Tamim tribe to which the ruling family of Qatar, the House of Thani, also belong. His father was the founder of the Qatar Armed Forces.

He received a bachelor's degree in air science from King Faisal Air Academy in 1987 and also, a law degree from Beirut Arab University in 1993. He holds a master's degree in public law (1991) and a PhD in law (2006), both of which he received from Cairo University.

== Career ==
Al-Attiyah started his career as a fighter pilot and joined Qatar's air force where he served from 1987 to 1995. He left the air force and established a law firm in 1995. From 2003 to 2008, he served as the president of the National Committee for Human Rights. During the same period he also owned a law firm.

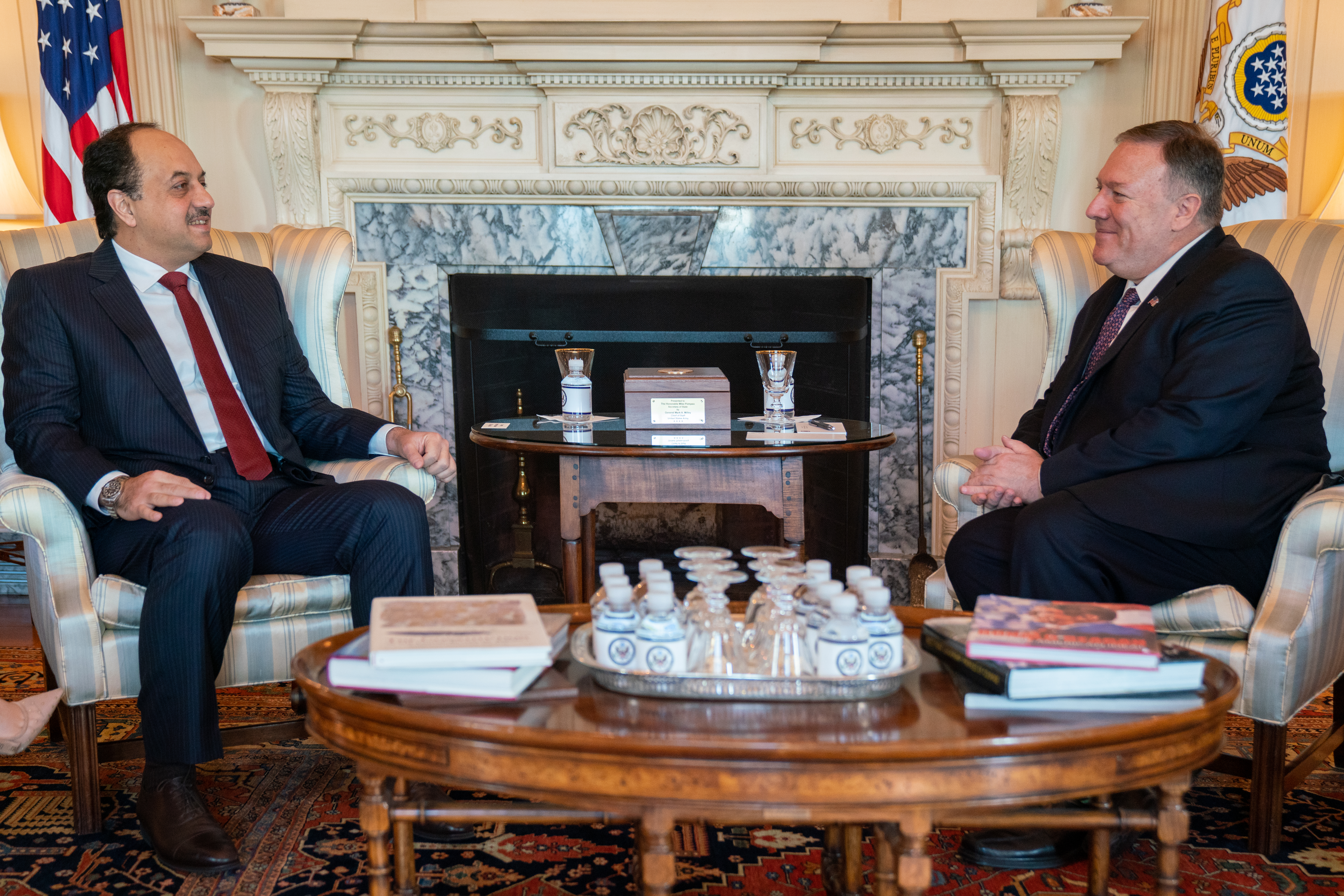
Al-Attiyah meets with U.S. Secretary of State Michael R. Pompeo at the Department of State in Washington, D.C., on 5 November 2019

Later, al-Attiyah served as the minister of state for international cooperation from 2008 to 2011. During his tenure he also served as acting minister for business and trade. In 2009, he became a member of Silatech's board of trustees. He is also a member of the board of directors and chairman of the executive committee of the Diar company, and a member of the board of directors of the Qatar electricity and water company.

In a cabinet reshuffle in September 2011, al-Attiyah was appointed minister of state for foreign affairs in the cabinet led by Prime Minister Hamad bin Jassim Al Thani. On 26 June 2013, al-Attiyah was named as the minister of foreign affairs in a cabinet reshuffle. He replaced Hamad bin Jassim in the post. The cabinet is headed by Prime Minister Abdullah bin Nasser Al Thani.

In a cabinet reshuffle on 27 January 2016, al-Attiyah was replaced as minister of foreign affairs by Mohammed bin Abdulrahman Al Thani. In the same reshuffle al-Attiyah was appointed minister of state for defense. On 12 November 2024, he was replaced by Saoud bin Abdulrahman Al Thani.
