= List of ambassadors of China to Qatar =

Coordinates: 25.361696°N 51.502830°E

Ambassador of China to Qatar
- Incumbent; Li Chen since 1 May 2015
- Inaugural holder: Hu Changlin
- Formation: 1 November 1988; 37 years ago

The ambassador of China to Qatar is the official representative of the People's Republic of China to the State of Qatar.

== List of representatives ==
Diplomatic agrément/Diplomatic accreditation	Ambassador	Chinese language zh:中国驻卡塔尔大使列表	Observations	Premier of the People's Republic of China	List of prime ministers of Qatar	Term end
July 9, 1988			The governments in Doha and Beijing established diplomatic relations.	Li Peng	Khalifa bin Hamad Al Thani	
November 1, 1988	Hu Changlin	zh:胡昌林		Li Peng	Khalifa bin Hamad Al Thani	October 18, 1991
October 18, 1991	Tan Shengzheng	谭声琤		Li Peng	Khalifa bin Hamad Al Thani	April 4, 1996
April 4, 1996	Gao Wenxian	高文献		Li Peng	Hamad bin Khalifa Al Thani	July 26, 2000
July 26, 2000	Zhou Xiuhua (PRC diplomat)	zh:周秀华		Zhu Rongji	Abdullah bin Khalifa Al Thani	August 19, 2002
August 19, 2002	Zhao Huimin	zh:赵会民		Zhu Rongji	Abdullah bin Khalifa Al Thani	March 8, 2005
March 8, 2005	Li Jianying (PRC diplomat)	李建英		Wen Jiabao	Abdullah bin Khalifa Al Thani	June 14, 2007
June 14, 2007	Yue Xiaoyong	zh:岳晓勇		Wen Jiabao	Hamad bin Jassim bin Jaber Al Thani	October 25, 2010
October 25, 2010	Zhang Zhiliang (PRC diplomat)	张志良		Wen Jiabao	Hamad bin Jassim bin Jaber Al Thani	October 29, 2012
October 29, 2012	Gao Youzhen	高有祯		Wen Jiabao	Hamad bin Jassim bin Jaber Al Thani	April 1, 2015
May 1, 2015	Li Chen	李琛		Li Keqiang	Abdullah bin Nasser bin Khalifa Al Thani	
