= Mohammed bin Abdulrahman bin Jassim Al Thani =

Prime Minister of Qatar since 2023

His Highness Sheikh Mohammed bin Abdulrahman Al Thani
- محمد بن عبد الرحمن آل ثاني
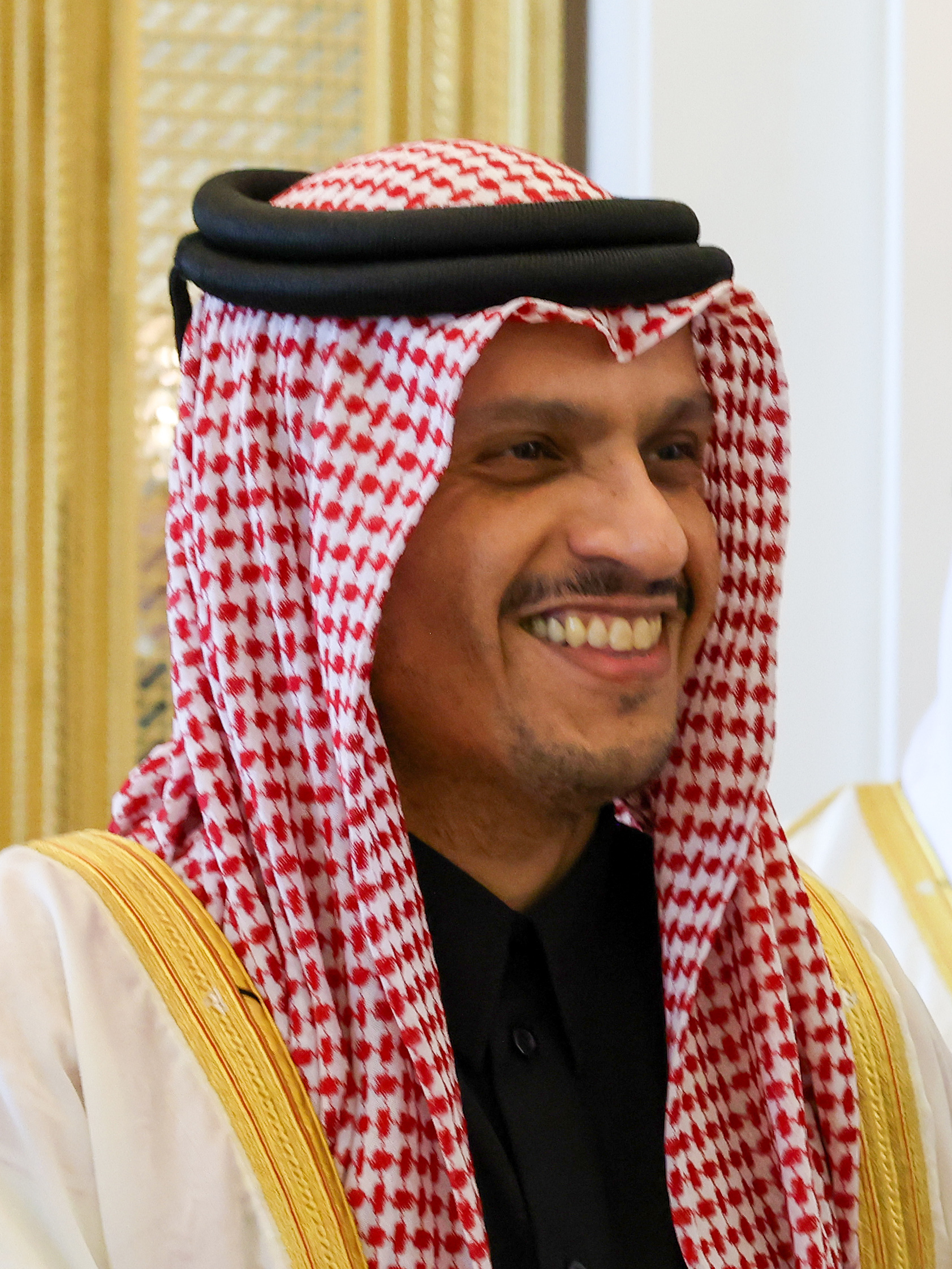
- Mohammed in 2024

7th Prime Minister of Qatar
- Incumbent
- Assumed office 7 March 2023
- Monarch: Tamim bin Hamad Al Thani
- Deputy: Khalid bin Mohammad Al Attiyah; Saoud bin Abdulrahman Al Thani
- Preceded by: Khalid bin Khalifa Al Thani

Minister of Foreign Affairs
- Incumbent
- Assumed office 27 January 2016
- Monarch: Tamim bin Hamad Al Thani
- Prime Minister: Abdullah bin Nasser Al Thani; Khalid bin Khalifa Al Thani; Himself
- Preceded by: Khalid bin Mohammad Al Attiyah

Deputy Prime Minister of Qatar
- In office 15 November 2017 – 7 March 2023
- Monarch: Tamim bin Hamad Al Thani
- Preceded by: Ahmad bin Abdullah Al Mahmoud

Personal details
- Born: 1 November 1980 (age 45) Doha, Qatar
- Education: Qatar University

Mohammed bin Abdulrahman Al Thani (Arabic: : محمد بن عبد الرحمن آل ثاني; : محمد بن عبد الرحمن آل ثاني; born 1 November 1980) is a Qatari diplomat, economist, and politician who has been the Prime Minister of Qatar since March 2023 and its Minister of Foreign Affairs since 2016. Additionally, he is the Chairman of the Qatar Fund for Development (QFFD) and is a member of Qatar's Supreme Council for Economic Affairs and Investments. He previously held the positions of Chairman of the Qatar Investment Authority from 2018 to 2023 and deputy prime minister from 2017 to 2023.

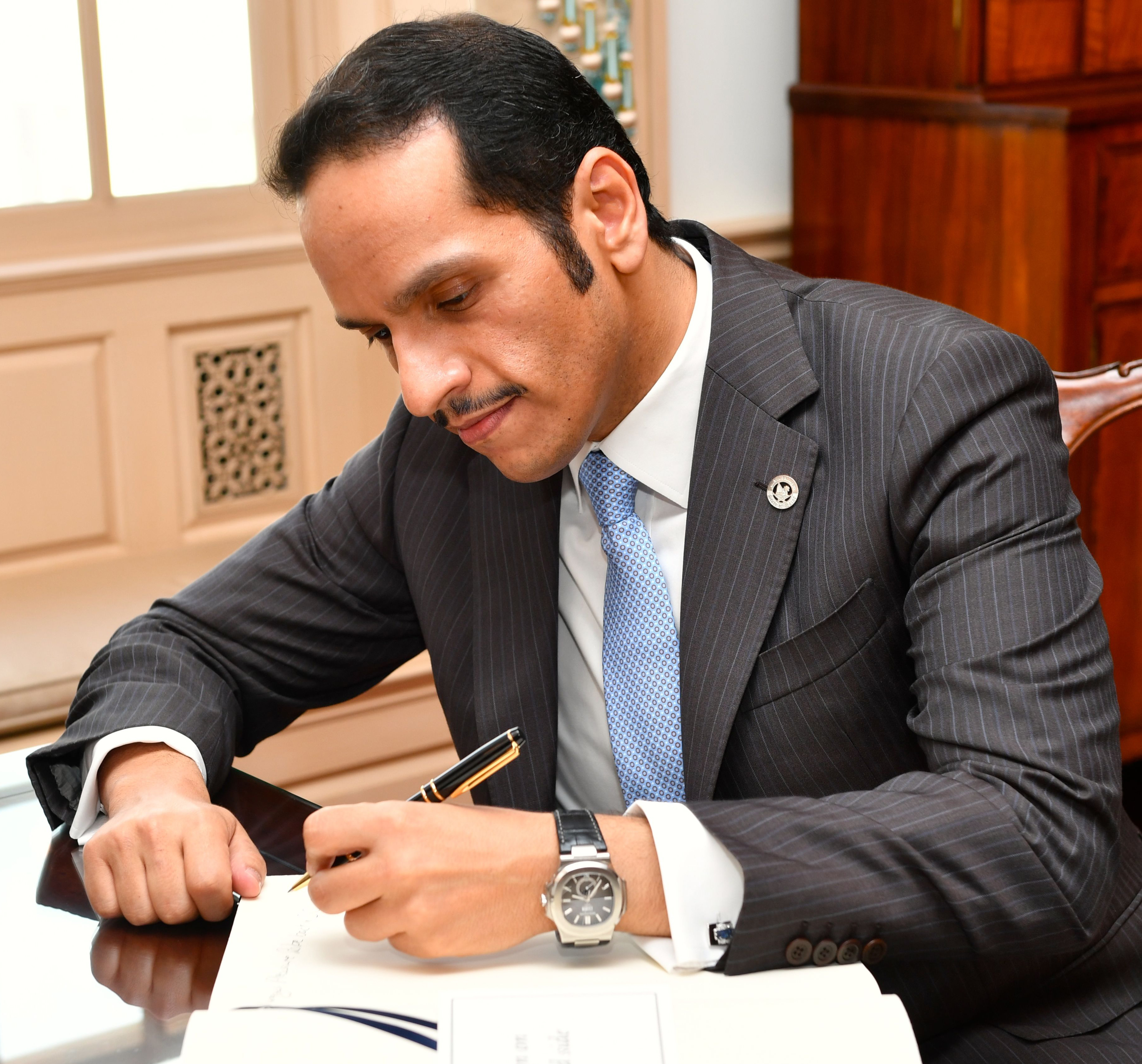
Mohammed bin Abdulrahman Al Thani in 2017

== Early life and education ==
Mohammed bin Abdulrahman Al Thani was born and grew up in Doha, Qatar. He is a member of the Qatari royal family as a member of the House of Thani. In 2003, he graduated with a bachelor's degree in economics and business administration from the College of Business and Economics at Qatar University.

== Career ==
Al Thani started his career as an economic researcher at the Supreme Council for Family Affairs in 2003. He worked as the same institution's director of economic affairs from 2005 until 2009.

In 2009, he joined the Ministry of Business and Trade as the director of the Small and Medium-sized Enterprises (SME) Support Project and Public-Private Partnerships department, where he helped establish Enterprise Qatar. The following year, in 2010, he was appointed as the Secretary for Follow-up Affairs to the Personal Representative of the Emir at the Amiri Diwan, and also served as the deputy chairman of the Qatar Mining Company.

In 2011, Al Thani was appointed chairman of the SME Executive Committee as well as the Aspire-Katara Investment Company's board of directors. He was promoted to the rank of undersecretary in 2012.

=== Diplomatic and Ministerial Roles ===
Al Thani joined the foreign ministry in 2013, serving as the assistant foreign minister for international cooperation affairs. He was named chairman of the Qatar Fund for Development (QFFD) in 2014 and served in that capacity until 2024. In 2014, he was also appointed to the Supreme Council for Economic Affairs and Investment in Qatar.

Al Thani was named Minister of Foreign Affairs on 27 January 2016. On 29 November 2017, he was appointed Deputy Prime Minister. In 2018, he was named chairman of the Qatar Investment Authority (QIA) board of directors, a role he completed in 2023.

Khalid bin Khalifa bin Abdulaziz Al Thani resigned on March 7, 2023, and Al Thani was sworn in as Prime Minister of Qatar, while continuing to serve as the country's foreign minister.

== See also ==
- List of foreign ministers in 2016
- List of foreign ministers in 2017
- List of current foreign ministers

Political offices
Preceded by Khalid bin Mohammad Al Attiyah	Minister of Foreign Affairs; 2016–present	Incumbent
Preceded by Khalid bin Khalifa bin Abdul Aziz Al Thani	Prime Minister of Qatar; 2023–present	Incumbent
