= Al Fakhro =

The Fakhro family, (Arabic: آل فخرو; also spelled Al-Fakhroo) attributing to their great-grandfather Fakher from Banu Tamim. The name Fakhroh came from their great-grandfather Fakher whose son of Tamim bin Mor bin Ad bin Muder bin Adnan which is considered as a very ancient Arab tribe dwelled by people from the midst of the Arabian Peninsula.

== Geographic distribution ==
The Al Fakhro settled in both Qatar and Bahrain during the seventeenth century. This is because they were obliged to move from the Arabian Peninsula, passing by Iraq, then to some areas in the Persian gulf, including Bandar Deylam and Shatt Bani Tamim, and finally to Qatar and Bahrain. In Qatar they notably settled in the regions of Nozwah, Tembek, Tha'ayin, and Hawar Island where they built the famous wells which still exists in the Hawar island, and which dates back to the last three centuries. Moreover, the Al Fakhro is now distributed within Al-Khor, Al-Wakrah, Al-Jasra, and Doha. Some of them have settled in Al-Manama, and Muharraq, Bahrain; in ash-Sharqiyah, and Jubail, Saudi Arabia; and also in Kuwait and United Arab Emirates.

== Short Summary ==
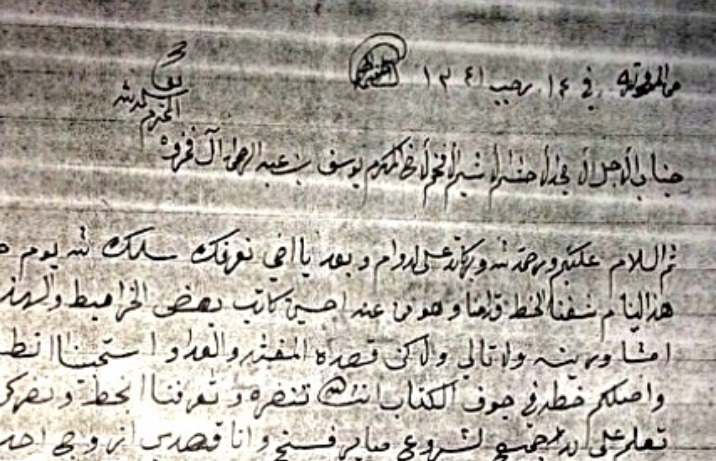
A document sent in the year 1920 A.D. to Yusuf bin Abdul-Rahman Al-Hassan Al Fakhro.

The Al Fakhro is considered to be highly respected by the leaders as well as the other families and tribes; they are considered to be Sunni Arabs. Some members of this family have played major roles in the political, economic, and social lives. In addition, they have been very close to the ruling families in Qatar, Bahrain, Saudi Arabia, and the United Arab Emirates. Al Fakhro belongs to Banu Tamim and has been mentioned in ‘Gazetteer of the Persian Gulf’ written by J. G. Lorimer.

The family is renowned for its long history and because of its members who are well known for their knowledge and trade. One example is Mohamed bin Abdurrahman Al Hassan Al Fakhro, who was nicknamed ‘Half the Universe’ because of his vast knowledge. In addition, Alwajih Abdurrahman bin Abdullah Al Hassan Al Fakhro who had been financing the Ottoman Garrison located in Basra for a whole year.

== Branches ==
- Al-Hassan
- Al-Darwish
- Al-Obaidan
- Al-Othman
- Al-Khal
- Al-Qassim

== Notable people ==
- Ibrahim bin Yousuf Al-Fakhro
- Nasser bin Mohammed Al-Fakhro
- Mohamed bin Abdulrahman Al-Fakhro
- Jamal bin Mohammed Al-Fakhro
