= Ahmad bin Abdullah Al Mahmoud =

Qatari diplomat and politician

- أحمد بن عبد الله آل محمود
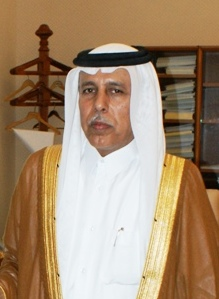
- Al Mahmoud in 2011

Speaker of the Shura Council of Qatar
- In office 14 November 2017 – 27 October 2021
- Preceded by: Mohamed Bin Mubarak Al-Khulaifi
- Succeeded by: Hassan bin Abdullah al-Ghanem

Deputy Prime Minister and Minister of State for Cabinet Affairs
- In office September 2011 – 1 November 2017
- Monarchs: Tamim bin Hamad Al Thani; Hamad bin Khalifa Al Thani
- Prime Minister: Abdullah bin Nasser Al Thani; Hamad bin Jassim Al Thani
- Preceded by: Abdullah bin Hamad Al Attiyah

Minister of State for Foreign Affairs
- In office 1995 – September 2011
- Monarch: Hamad bin Khalifa Al Thani
- Prime Minister: Hamad bin Jassim Al Thani
- Succeeded by: Khalid bin Mohammad Al Attiyah

Personal details
- Children: 4
- Education: Cairo University; Central Michigan University

Ahmad bin Abdullah Al Mahmoud (Arabic: أحمد بن عبد الله آل محمود) is a Qatari diplomat and politician. In November 2017, he was elected as the Speaker of the Shura Council of Qatar. He was deputy prime minister and minister of state for cabinet affairs from September 2011 to November 2017.

== Early life and education ==
He holds a bachelor's degree in Arabic and Islamic studies from Cairo University and a master's degree in economics from Central Michigan University.

== Career ==
Al Mahmoud began his career in the ministry of foreign affairs and worked as third secretary. He served as the ambassador of Qatar to the United States and Oman, and as a nonresident ambassador to Mexico and Venezuela. He then was appointed minister of state for foreign affairs in 1995.

He was appointed deputy prime minister and minister of state for cabinet affairs in September 2011. He kept his portfolio in the cabinet reshuffle on 26 June 2013 and became deputy to Prime Minister Abdullah bin Nasser Al Thani. His tenure ended on 1 November 2017. Then he was named as the Speaker of the Shura Council of Qatar.

=== Honours ===
In 2013, Al Mahmoud was awarded the Order of the Republic Class I by the President of the Republic of Sudan, Omar al-Bashir.
