= Zhou Jian (diplomat) =

Chinese diplomat

- 周剑

Ambassador of China to Qatar
- Incumbent
- Assumed office 18 July 2019
- Preceded by: Li Chen

Personal details
- Born: March 1968 (age 58) Gushi County, Henan, China
- Party: Chinese Communist Party
- Education: Renmin University of China

Chinese name
- Traditional Chinese: 周劍
- Simplified Chinese: 周剑
Transcriptions
Standard Mandarin
- Hanyu Pinyin: Zhōu Jiàn

Zhou Jian (Chinese: 周剑; born March 1968) is a Chinese diplomat currently serving as ambassador of China to Qatar.

== Biography ==
Zhou was born in Gushi County, Henan, in March 1968. In 1992 he entered the Renmin University of China, majoring in history, where he graduated in 1995. After university, he was assigned to the Department of Asian Affairs of the Ministry of Foreign Affairs of the People's Republic of China. In 1999 he was a secretary in Chinese Embassy in the Republic of Singapore. In 2002 he was appointed as deputy director of the Department of Policy Planning of Foreign Affairs of the People's Republic of China, and 4 years later promoted to the Director position. On July 18, 2019, he was appointed ambassador of China to Qatar, replacing Li Chen.

Diplomatic posts
Preceded by Li Chen	Ambassador of China to Qatar; 2019	Incumbent
