= Hamad bin Ali Al Attiyah =

Qatari politician

His Excellency Hamad bin Ali Al Attiyah
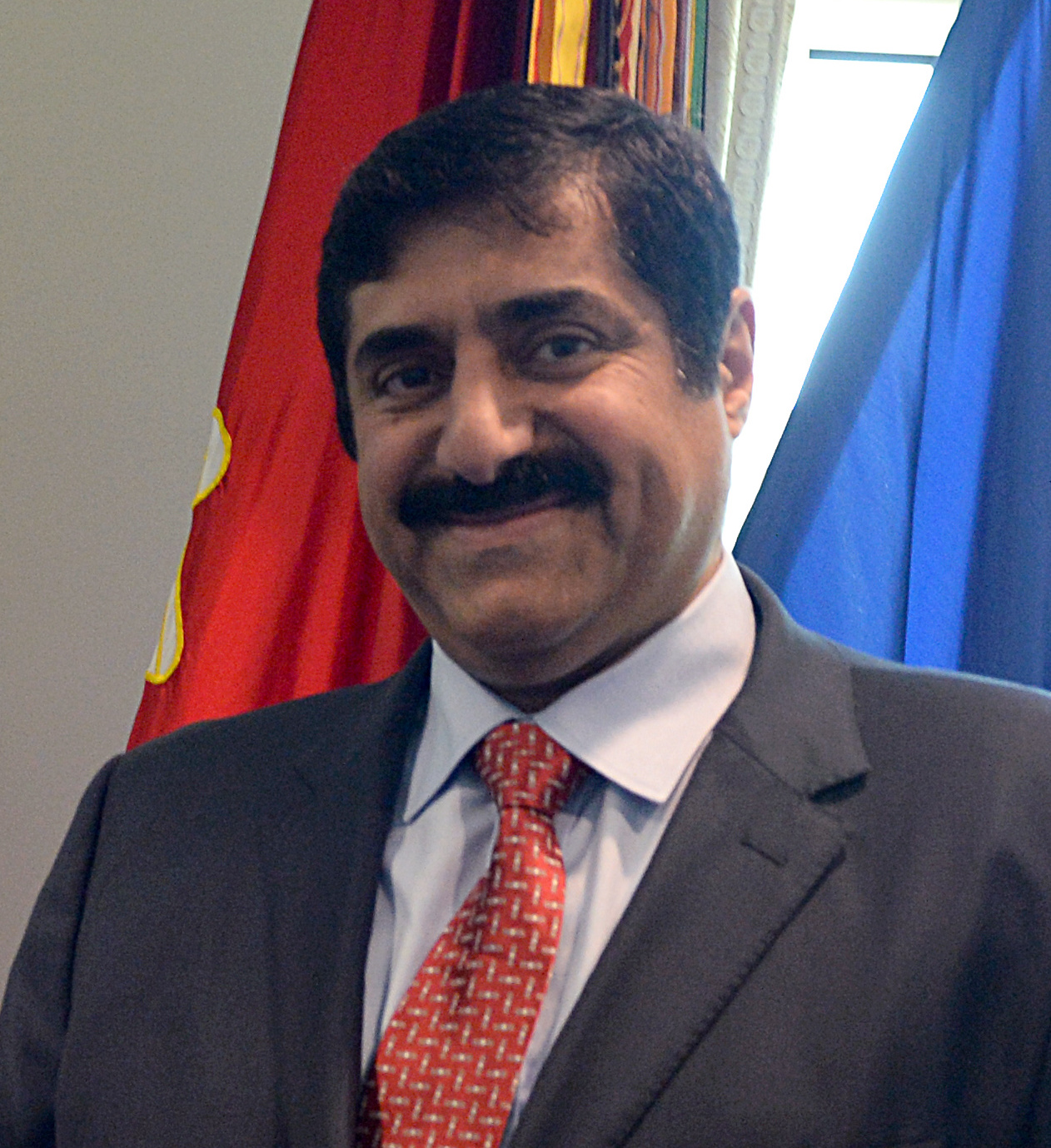
- Hamad Al Attiyah at the Pentagon, Oct 2015.

State Minister for Defense
- In office June 2013 – January 2016
- Monarch: Tamim bin Hamad Al Thani
- Prime Minister: Abdullah bin Nasser bin Khalifa Al Thani
- Succeeded by: Khalid bin Mohammad Al Attiyah

Personal details
- Occupation: Politician

Hamad bin Ali Al Attiyah (Arabic: حمد بن علي العطية) is a Qatari politician who served as the State Minister for Defense. He oversaw the deployment of Qatari forces during the Libyan Civil War as Chief of Staff of the Armed Forces.

== Career ==
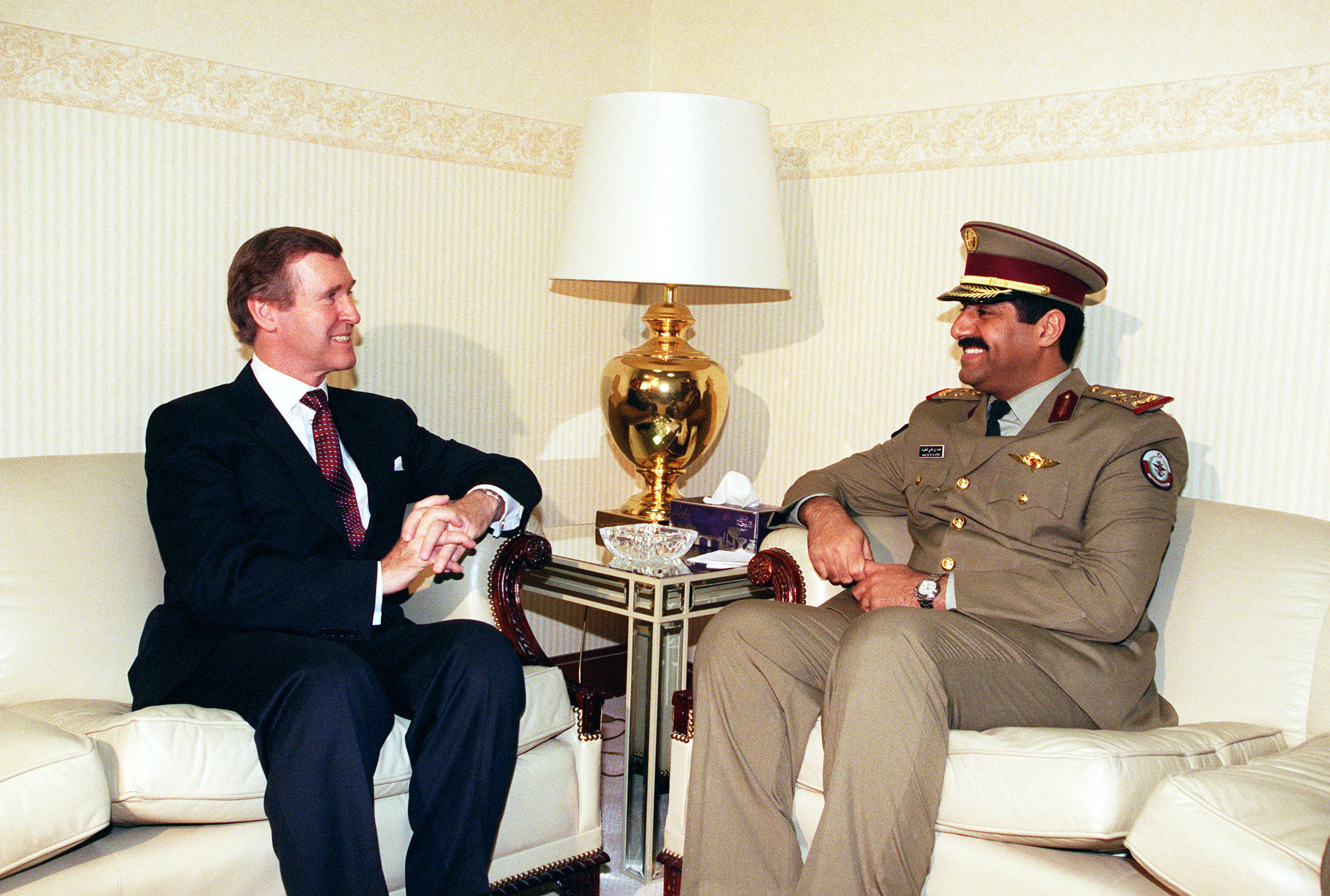
Hamad bin Ali Al Attiyah meeting with William Cohen in October 1998.

Al Attiyah has served as Chief of General Staff of the Armed Forces since the 1990s. During the Libyan Civil War, which began in 2011, Al Attiyah revealed that Qatar had provided military and financial support to the Libyan rebels. He stated that "the numbers of Qataris on the ground were hundreds in every region".

In June 2013, shortly after the ascension of Tamim bin Hamad Al Thani to the throne, Al Attiyah was promoted to the State Minister for Defense. He signed a $11 billion arms deal with US Defense Minister Chuck Hagel in July 2014. As of 2015, he was president of the multi-sports club El Jaish SC.
