= Al Raya =

Qatari daily newspaper

- Type: Daily newspaper
- Owner: Abdullah bin Hamad al-Attiyah
- Publisher: Gulf Publishing and Printing Company
- Editor-in-chief: Abdulla Taleb Al Marri
- Editor: Majid Al jubara
- Founded: 10 May 1979; 47 years ago
- Political alignment: Pro-government
- Language: Arabic
- Headquarters: Doha
- Country: Qatar
- Circulation: 30,000 (as of 2019)
- Sister newspapers: Gulf Times
- Website: Al Raya

Al Raya (Arabic: الراية, lit. 'The Banner') is an Arabic-language pro-government daily newspaper published in Doha, Qatar. It is a semi-official newspaper, and is one of the five leading Qatari dailies. As for Arabic-language dailies published in the country, Al Raya is among the three major newspapers along with Al Sharq and Al Watan.

Through its publisher, it is owned by Abdullah bin Hamad al-Attiyah, formerly the deputy Prime Minister of Qatar, as well as head of the emir's official royal court. Gulf Times is Al Raya's English-language sister newspaper.

== History and profile ==
Al Raya was launched by the Gulf Publishing and Printing Company as a weekly newspaper on 10 May 1979. The company, which was founded by Ali bin Jaber Al Thani, a member of the royal family of Qatar, also owns Gulf Times, an English-language daily. Based in Doha, Al Raya is the second Arabic newspaper published in Qatar. On 27 January 1980, Al Raya was relaunched as a daily newspaper.

In 1996, a corpus was created which included 187 articles published in Al Raya.

Nasser Mohamed Al-Othman was the first editor-in-chief of the daily newspaper. In the initial period, many leading Arab journalists wrote for the daily. Abdulla Ghanim Al Binali Al Muhannadi was appointed editor-in-chief of Al-Raya in 2019. In 2023, Abdulla Taleb Al Marri became the editor-in-chief of the newspaper.

== Ownership, political stance and content ==
Al Raya has a pro-government stance, and although it is privately owned, it has at times been considered a semi-official newspaper of Qatar. It is owned by Abdullah bin Hamad al-Attiyah, formerly the deputy Prime Minister of Qatar, as well as head of the emir's official royal court. Gulf Times is Al Raya's English-language sister newspaper.

Al Raya mostly provides news about the receptions and activities of the ruling family, Al Thani, as well as about official events. In addition, the daily has large supplements on sports and business as well as a special supplement called He and She. The paper offered a weekly page on environmental issues from 1999 to 2005.

Following the 2013 coup in Egypt, Al Raya concentrated on the ongoing demonstrations of supporters of the Muslim Brotherhood and ousted President Mohamed Morsi. In August 2013, an editorial of the paper argued that possible US-led intervention against Syria would not be celebrated, but that the Assad regime was "murderous", and "stupidly" left no other option than such an intervention.

According to the US State Department, the newspaper has been involved in the promotion of antisemitic content. In April 2019, it published an article stating that "The Zionist movement managed to establish the 'Holocaust culture' in Western political ethics and morally forced it on European societies." The article described the Nazi Holocaust as "alleged" and placed the survivors in quotation marks. In October 2019, the newspaper also published a cartoon by a Palestinian artist that depicts Israel as a stereotypical caricature of an Orthodox Jew.

== Circulation ==
In the early 1990s, Al Raya had a circulation of 10,000 copies and was distributed in Saudi Arabia and Egypt in addition to its native Qatar. It had higher levels of circulation until 1995 when the other Arabic daily, Al Watan, was launched; Al-Raya then lost one-third of its circulation. In 2000, Al Raya was the second best selling newspaper in Qatar with a circulation of 18,000 copies. The estimated circulation of the paper in 2003 was 8,000 copies. Al Raya's circulation increased to 18,000 copies again in 2008. In 2010, the online version of the paper was the 47th most-visited website in the MENA region.
