= Ashraf Muhammad Yusuf Uthman Abd al-Salam =

Ashraf Muhammad Yusuf Uthman Abd al-Salam (Arabic: عبد السلام عثمان يوسف محمد اشرف; born 1984) is a financial and logistical supporter of al-Qaeda, Jabhat Fateh al-Sham (previously known as the al-Nusra Front) and al-Qaeda in Iraq. Al-Salam is a U.S. Department of the Treasury labeled Specially Designated Global Terrorist and was added to the United Nations and European Union sanctions lists for his association to the al-Qaeda network. Al-Salam has been fighting in Syria since early 2014.

== Background ==
Ashraf Muhammad Yusuf Uthman Abd al-Salam is a Jordanian national born in Iraq in 1984. Ashraf al-Salam also holds a national identification card from Qatar. It is believed that the founder of Jund al-Aqsa, Muhammad Yusuf Uthman Abd al-Salam, is his father and that al-Nusra Front and al-Qaeda supporter ‘Abd al-Malik Muhammad Yusuf Uthman ‘Abd al-Salam is his brother. Ashraf al-Salam’s brother ‘Abd al-Malik al-Salam is also known as Umar al-Qatari.

The man thought to be his father, Muhammad Yusuf Uthman Abd al-Salam, was a Jordanian national of Palestinian descent who was born in Iraq and lived in Qatar. While in Qatar, the suspected father Muhammad al-Salam provided material and logistical support to al-Qaeda in Iraq, the predecessor group of ISIS. Before founding Jund al-Aqsa, Muhammad Yusuf Uthman Abd al-Salam was a longtime veteran of al-Qaeda and is believed to have worked closely with Osama bin Laden, Ayman al-Zawahiri, and Abdullah Azzam.

Ashraf al-Salam’s brother, ‘Abd al-Malik al-Salam is also a citizen of Jordan and a holder of Qatari identification.

== Support of terrorism ==
=== Al-Qaeda in Iraq ===
Ashraf al-Salam began working with al-Qaeda in Iraq (AQI) in 2005 while the group was under the leadership of Abu Musab al-Zarqawi. According to the U.S. Treasury, Ashraf supported AQI by opening “stores to facilitate the communications of AQI officials” and assisting in the transfer of thousands of dollars to support AQI operations. Al-Qaeda in Iraq is widely referred to as the predecessor of ISIS.

=== Al-Nusra Front ===
According to the U.S. Department of the Treasury, in early 2012 Ashraf al-Salam facilitated the travel of “associates” to Syria in order to provide training to Syria-based al-Nusra Front members. Also during early 2012, Ashraf al-Salam worked with al-Nusra Front and an “Iraqi explosives expert” in an effort to commit acts of terrorism with explosives.

=== Al-Qaeda Core ===
In mid-2012, al-Salam worked with Qatari al-Qaeda financier Khalifa Muhammad Turki al-Subaiy to facilitate the transfer of funds intended for al-Qaeda in Pakistan. In 2008, the U.S. Department of the Treasury listed al-Subaiy in its press release entitled “Gulf-Based al Qaida Financiers” while the UN listed al-Subaiy in 2008 as being associated with al-Qaeda.

According to the U.S. Department of Treasury, al-Salam worked with al-Subaiy “to facilitate the transfer of hundreds of thousands of dollars” to Pakistan-based al-Qaeda. The Telegraph covered al-Salam's connections to al-Subaiy in October 2014. The Telegraph article was later covered in Arabic and appeared on the e-newspaper Bahrain Mirror.

== International terrorist designations ==
In September 2014, the U.S. Department of Justice designated Ashraf al-Salam a Specially Designated Global Terrorist pursuant to Executive Order 13224.

On January 23, 2015, the UN added Ashraf al-Salam to its ISIL (Da’esh) & Al-Qaida Sanctions List. As a result, al-Salam has been subject to a UN assets freeze, travel ban, and arms embargo as specified in the 2012 Security Council resolution 2083 of Chapter VII of the UN Charter.

In February 2015, the European Union added al-Salam and three other individuals to a sanctions list against persons and entities associated with the al-Qaeda network.

In each of the three designations, Ashraf's brother, ‘Abd al-Malik Muhammad Yusuf Uthman ‘Abd al-Salam, was also listed.

== Syria ==
According to the U.S. Treasury and UN, Al-Salam has been “a fighter” in Syria since early 2014. It has been presumed that al-Salam is a member of the al-Nusra Front in Syria for his ties to the group.
