= Mohammed bin Abdullah bin Mohammed Al Yousef Al-Sulaiti =

Qatari politician

Minister of State for Cabinet Affairs
- In office 19 October 2021 – 8 January 2024
- Monarch: Tamim bin Hamad Al Thani
- Prime Minister: Khalid bin Khalifa bin Abdul Aziz Al Thani

Mohammed bin Abdullah bin Mohammed Al Yousef Al-Sulaiti is a Qatari politician. Previously he had served as Minister of State for Cabinet Affairs.

== Career ==
In 2003, Sulaiti was a member of the Study of Naturalization Status Committee.

From 2004 until 2016, he worked as Rapporteur of the Shura Council and as member of the Legal and Legislative Affairs Committee. Between 2004 and 2008, Sulaiti served as member of the Cultural Affairs and Media Committee. From 2008 to 2011, he was a Rapporteur of the Committee on Internal and Foreign Affairs and member of the Executive Committee of the Arab Parliamentary Union. In addition, Sulaiti served as member of the Organisation of Islamic Cooperation (OIC) Member States from 2006 until 2011 and as member of the General Committee of OIC Member States from 2012 to 2014.

From 2007 to 2014, he served as member of the Work Progress in the Gulf Cooperation Council’s Advisory Board Committee.

In 2015, Sulaiti served as Chairman of Oil and Gas Future Committee in the GCC.

From 2017 until 2021, Sulaiti was Deputy Speaker of the Shura Council.

Since 2005, Sulaiti has served as member of the Qatar National Committee.

Between 19 October 2021 and 7 January 2024, he was the Minister of State for Cabinet Affairs.
