= Nasser Al-Othman =

Qatari journalist and author (born 1939)

- Born: 1939 (age 86–87)
- Occupation: Journalist

Nasser Al-Othman (Arabic: ناصر العثمان; born in 1939, full name Nasser Mohammed Al-Othman Al-Fakhroo) is a Qatari journalist and author. He formerly directed the Culture and Arts Department, a now-defunct governmental agency which supervised Qatar's cultural development. He also served as editor in chief of daily newspaper Al Raya and has been attributed with the creation of Qatar's first radio station.

== Education ==
Al-Othman began his primary schooling in 1949. He studied in Lebanon from 1952 to 1961, graduating from International College in Beirut.

== Career ==
After returning from Lebanon, Al-Othman took up several positions in the Ministry of Education (MOE) starting in 1962. He served as head of the ministry's UNESCO program, and was appointed managing editor of Education, a magazine published by a sub-department of the MOE called the Qatar National Commission for Education, Culture and Science. He is attributed with being involved in the formation of Qatar's first radio station in 1965. In 1970, he oversaw the first international book fair to be held in Qatar. He was granted membership of the founding committee of the Qatar National Museum by 1973.

In 1977, he was appointed as director of the Ministry of Information's subordinate department, the Culture and Arts Department. During his tenure, he supervised the inauguration of Qatar's first art gallery.

In 1978, he was involved in the founding of Gulf Publishing & Printing Company, the parent company of newspapers Gulf Times and its Arabic counterpart, Al Raya. He joined Al Raya as editor in chief in 1979.

He published the book With their bare hands: the story of the oil industry in Qatar in 1984. The book is divided into four main parts with several chapters. In the first part, the historical background of Qatar and the early days of oil exploration are discussed. Oilfield workers are interviewed and described in the second part. The third part examines the nationalization of Qatar's oil industry and its future outlooks. Most notably, the book republishes numerous agreements in their entirety throughout several appendices in the fourth part.

He became the first Qatari journalist to be allowed entry into the Soviet Union in 1985. He parted ways with Al Raya in 1986, and joined Al Sharq three years later. He was elected as secretary general of the Gulf Press Association in 2005. He was later elected to the advisory board of the Doha Centre for Media Freedom, being the only Qatari on a board consisting of ten members.
