= Gulf Times =

Qatari newspaper

- Type: Daily newspaper
- Format: Broadsheet
- Owner: Abdullah bin Hamad al-Attiyah
- Publisher: Gulf Publishing and Printing Company
- Editor-in-chief: Faisal Abdulhameed al-Mudahka
- Editor: K T Chacko
- Founded: 10 December 1978
- Political alignment: Pro-government
- Language: English
- Headquarters: Doha, Qatar
- Sister newspapers: Al Raya
- Website: gulf-times.com

Gulf Times is an English-language pro-government newspaper published in Doha, Qatar.

Through its publisher, it is owned by Abdullah bin Hamad al-Attiyah, formerly the deputy Prime Minister of Qatar, as well as head of the emir's official royal court. Al Raya is Gulf Times' English-language sister newspaper.

The paper is among the three leading English-language newspapers in Qatar, along with The Peninsula and Qatar Tribune.

== History ==
The publisher, Gulf Publishing and Printing Company, was named by its founding members in an assembly which took place on 19 January 1978, during which the name Gulf Times was also chosen for the company's English-language newspaper. The company was founded on 1 June 1978. It received its legal license on 5 August 1978, and two days later the Minister of Information also approved the Publication of Al Raya, Gulf Time's Arabic-language sister publication.

The first edition of Gulf Times was published on 10 December 1978, as a weekly tabloid, under the leadership of Yousef Jassim Darwish, the editor-in-chief of both Gulf Times and Al Raya, whose first issue was published on 10 May 1979. On 22 February 1981, the newspaper transitioned to daily publication. In December 1995, it changed formats to broadsheet.

It was announced that in November 1985, the Gulf Times would begin distributing its newspaper in the relatively remote areas of Al Shamal, Mesaieed and Dukhan.

On 1 January 1993, the publisher—encompassing both Gulf Times and Al Raya—moved from its temporary headquarters in Gulf Street southeast to its permanent headquarters in the Al Hilal Area.

== Ownership and editorial stance ==
Through its publisher, Gulf Publishing and Printing Company, Gulf Times is owned by Abdullah bin Hamad al-Attiyah, formerly the deputy Prime Minister of Qatar, as well as head of the emir's official royal court. Al Raya is Gulf Times' English-language sister newspaper.

Gulf Times is considered pro-government. It favours official perspectives and aligns itself with government policy, and sources confirm that "stories perceived as inconsistent with the government’s preferences are systematically discarded".

== Reception and content ==
The paper is among the three leading English-language newspapers in Qatar, along with The Peninsula and Qatar Tribune.

Currently, the paper's sections are as follows: editorial, analysis, news, economy, sports, library and archives, technical and local reporters.
