= HKH =

HKH may refer to:

- HKH Ranges, or the Hindu Kush-Himalayan Region
- Hawkhead railway station, in Scotland
- HKH General Contracting, founded by Hamad bin Khalid Al Thani
