= Saoud bin Abdulrahman Al Thani =

Senior Government Official (born 1970)

His Highness Sheikh Saoud Bin Abdulrahman Al Thani

Deputy Prime Minister of Qatar
- Incumbent
- Assumed office 12 November 2024
- Monarch: Tamim bin Hamad Al Thani
- Prime Minister: Mohammed bin Abdulrahman Al Thani
- Preceded by: Khalid bin Mohammad Al Attiyah

Minister of State for Defence Affairs
- Incumbent
- Assumed office 12 November 2024
- Monarch: Tamim bin Hamad Al Thani
- Prime Minister: Mohammed bin Abdulrahman Al Thani
- Preceded by: Khalid bin Mohammad Al Attiyah

Personal details
- Born: 19 February 1970 (age 56) Doha, Qatar
- Education: New Mexico State University (BS), Lyon University (MS)

Saoud bin Abdulrahman Al Thani (born 19 February 1970) is the Deputy Prime Minister and Minister of State for Defence Affairs in Qatar.

He is a senior government official, and former Secretary General of the Qatar Olympic Committee. He also served as Qatar’s Ambassador to the Federal Republic of Germany.

== Biography ==
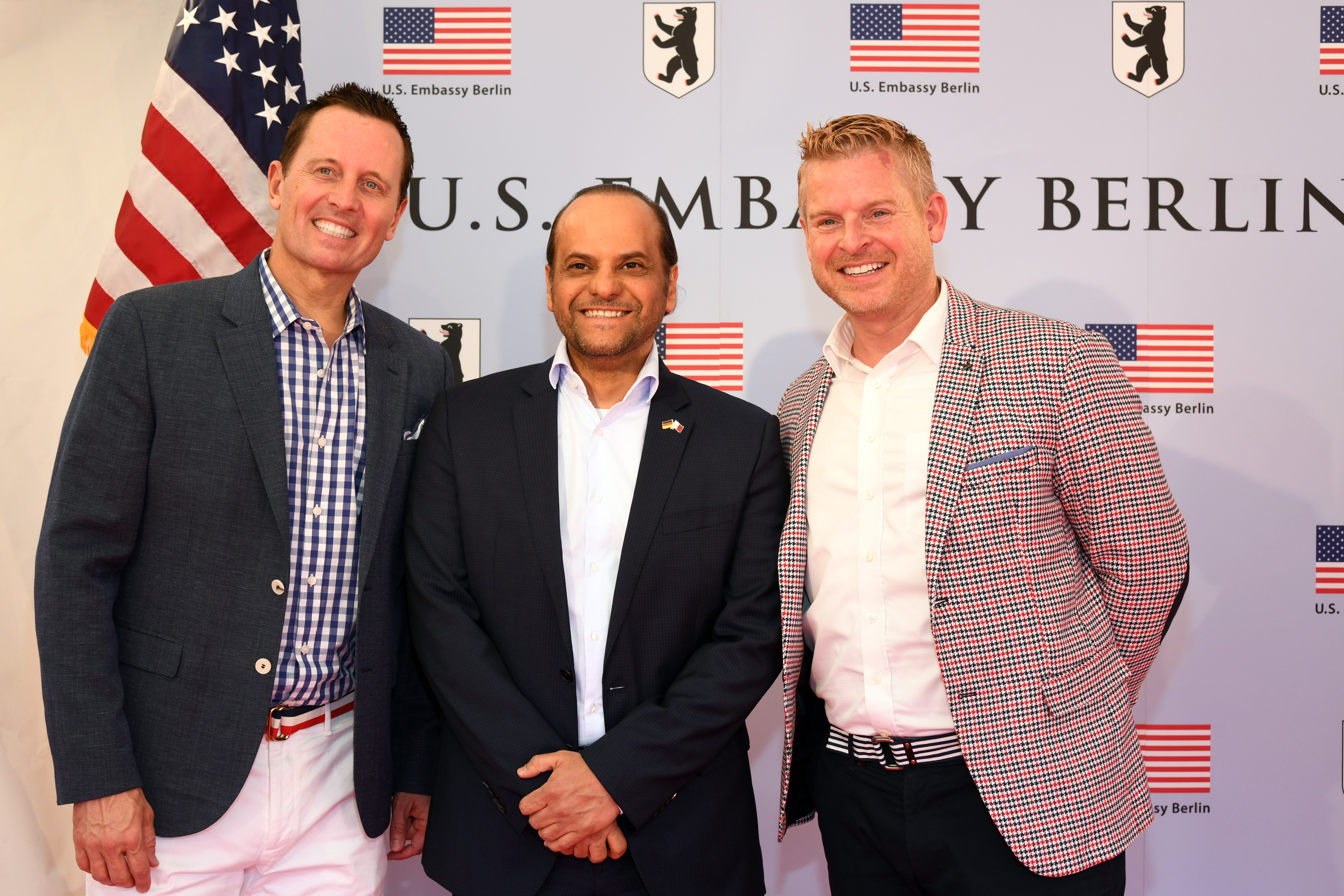
Richard Grenell, Saoud bin Abdulrahman Al Thani, and Matt Lashey, 4th of July 2018 in Berlin

Born in Doha, he completed an undergraduate degree in electrical engineering at New Mexico State University in 1993 before going on to gain a Master's Degree in Sports Management from the University of Lyon. He served in the Qatar Armed Forces before becoming involved in national level sports administration positions.

His first major organizational projects came as Director General of the committees for the 17th Arabian Gulf Cup and the 2005 West Asian Games, as well as being a committee member for the 2006 Asian Games. He served as the Secretary General of the Qatar Olympic Committee, President of the Qatar Basketball Federation and Vice-President of the International Fencing Federation (FIE).

Sheikh Saoud played a major role in the winning of bids for Qatar's first international level sports competitions including the 2014 FINA World Swimming Championships (25 m), the 2015 World Men's Handball Championship, 2016 UCI Road World Championships, 2018 Artistic Gymnastics World Championships and the 2019 World Championships in Athletics (being the bid leader for the latter). These projects formed part of the Qatar National Vision 2030, a long-term government plan to develop the nation's economic and cultural wealth.

He also promotes the participation of Qatari women in sports, noting the increased investment in women's sports in the country and participation of its female athletes at the 2011 Pan Arab Games and 2012 London Olympics.

He is a sports enthusiast and is particularly interested in tennis, shooting sports, soccer and swimming.

He served as Secretary General of the Qatar Olympic Committee from 2002 – 2015.

In 2017, he was appointed Ambassador of the State of Qatar to the Federal Republic of Germany and Non-resident Ambassador to the Czech Republic (2017-2019).

As Ambassador of Qatar to Germany he had many significant achievements, notably the opening of the Arab Cultural House “Al Diwan” in Berlin, a cultural house aimed at strengthening German and Arab cultural relations. The Embassy of the State of Qatar restored and rehabilitated the building to preserve its historical character and transformed it into an Arab cultural house. "Al Diwan" holds significant importance as the first Qatari cultural center outside the State of Qatar. Its opening marked a new chapter in Qatari-German cultural relations.

In 2020, he was appointed Chief of the Amiri Diwan on 27 October 2020 by the Amiri Order (5) of 2020.

Since 12 November 2024, Al Thani has served as Deputy Prime Minister and Minister of State for Defence Affairs.

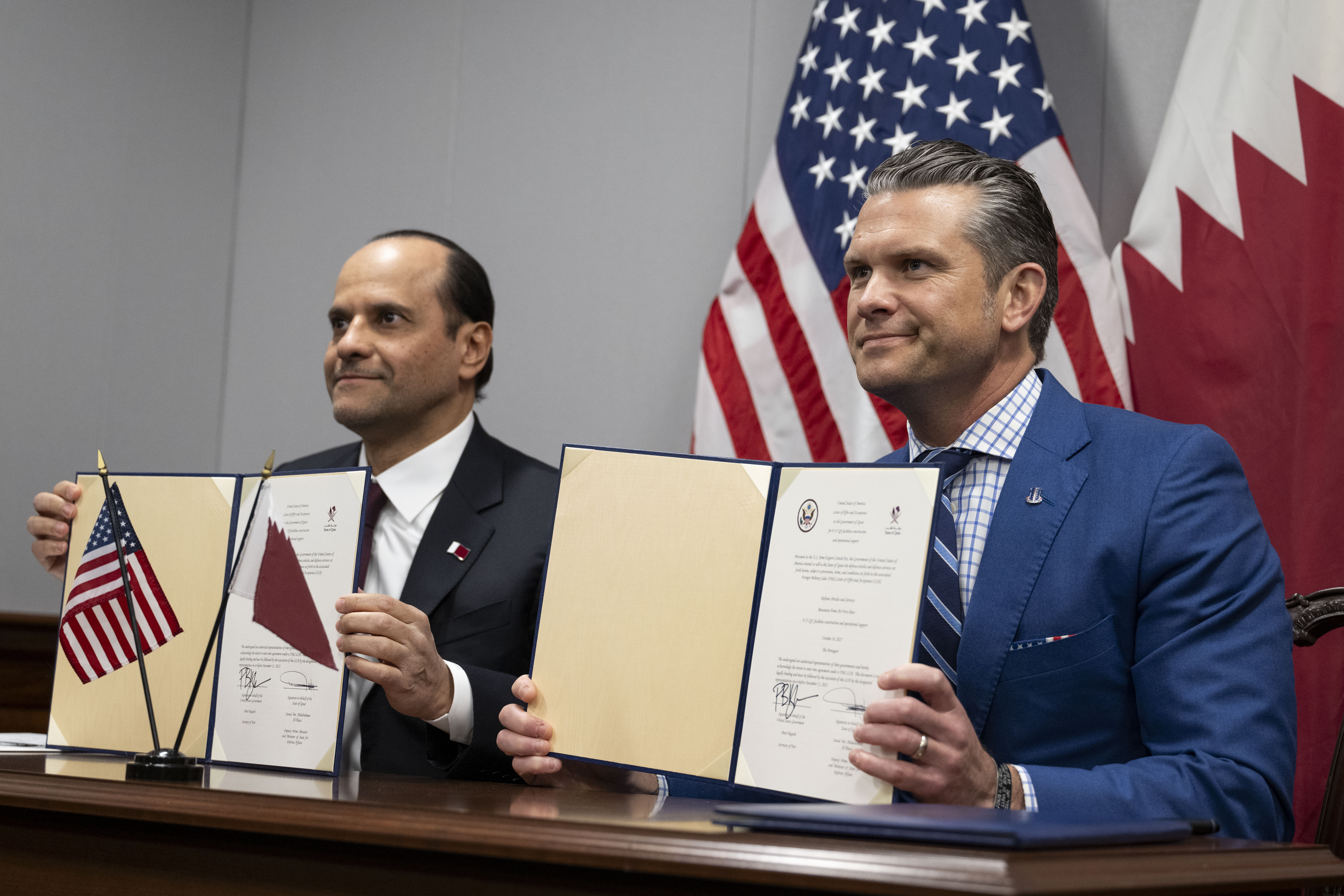
Al Thani and U.S. Secretary of Defense Pete Hegseth sign a letter of agreement for a Qatari Air Force facility in Idaho, 10 October 2025

On 10 October 2025 he and U.S. Secretary of Defense Pete Hegseth announced that a formal letter of acceptance had been signed with State of Qatar to establish an Qatar Emiri Air Force facility at Mountain Home AFB in Mountain Home, Idaho; it shall host a contingent of F-15s.

== Controversy ==
Al Thani faced criticism for a November 2021 tweet in which he claimed Israel "controls" the United States and urged Qatar to increase its influence on American decision-makers. He responded to a follower with: "With correct planning and a strong will, everything is possible." He also sparked controversy in March 2025 after deleting a tweet originally posted on 21 August 2014, which appeared to express support for Hamas (a group designated as a terrorist organization by the European Union, United States, and United Kingdom) reading "We Are all Hamas… Oh Al-Quds, revolt and commemorate Al-Qassam!"
