= Li Chen (diplomat) =

Chinese diplomat

- 李琛

Director of the Foreign Affairs Office of Ningxia Hui Autonomous Region
- Incumbent
- Assumed office September 2019

Chinese Ambassador to Qatar
- In office May 2015 – June 2019
- Preceded by: Gao Youzhen
- Succeeded by: Zhou Jian

Chinese Ambassador to Bahrain
- In office February 2012 – December 2014
- Preceded by: Yang Weiguo
- Succeeded by: Qi Zhenhong

Personal details
- Born: September 1963 (age 62) China
- Party: Chinese Communist Party

Li Chen (Chinese: 李琛; pinyin: Lǐ Chēn; born September 1963) is a Chinese diplomat. He previously served as the Chinese Ambassador to Qatar and the Chinese Ambassador to Bahrain.

Diplomatic posts
Preceded by Yang Weiguo	Chinese Ambassador to Bahrain; 2012–2015	Succeeded by Qi Zhenhong
Preceded by Gao Youzhen	Chinese Ambassador to Qatar; 2015–2019	Succeeded by Zhou Jian
