= Deputy Prime Minister of Qatar =

Political position in the Government of Qatar

The deputy prime minister of Qatar is a political position in the Cabinet of Qatar. Historically, several deputy prime ministers have served concurrently.

== Deputy Prime Ministers ==
| Name | Took office | Left office | Notes |
|---|---|---|---|
| Abdullah bin Khalifa Al Thani | July 1995 | October 1996 | |
| Mohammed bin Khalifa Al Thani | January 1998 | September 2003 | |
| Hamad bin Jassim bin Jaber Al Thani | September 2003 | April 2007 | |
| Abdullah bin Hamad Al Attiyah | September 2003 | April 2007 | |
| Abdullah bin Hamad Al Attiyah | 3 April 2007 | 18 January 2011 | |
| Ahmad bin Abdullah Al Mahmoud | September 2011 | November 2017 | |
| Mohammed bin Abdulrahman Al Thani | November 2017 | March 2023 | |
| Khalid bin Mohammad Al Attiyah | November 2017 | November 2024 | |
| Saoud bin Abdulrahman Al Thani | November 2024 | Incumbent | |

== See also ==
- Prime Minister of Qatar
- Cabinet of Qatar
