= Mohamed bin Abdulrahman M. Hassan Fakhro =

Qatari businessman

- Born: 1906; Al Bidda, Doha, Qatar
- Died: 1982 (aged 75–76); Muharraq, Manama, Bahrain
- Other name: Half of the World

Mohamed Bin Abdulrahman Al-Hassan Al-Fakhro (Arabic: محمد بن عبدالرحمن بن محمد بن حسن بن محمود آل فخرو), nicknamed Half of the World, (Arabic: نص الدنيا) was a wealthy businessman from Qatar. He bravely fought in the Zubara War of 1935 with the Al Thani. He was given his nickname by the then ruler of Qatar, Sheikh Abdullah bin Jasssim Al Thani for his vast knowledge and wisdom.

== Career ==
Shaikh Abdulla Bin Jassim also considered him to be his right-hand man. He was said to have brought two cannons (still standing in front of Zubara Fort) from India on-board his uncle's ships after smuggling gold coins (sewed into his vest), because in those days it was forbidden by the English to smuggle gold out of the Persian Gulf area. In 1948, he moved to live in Bahrain, due to his second marriage, whom her father Yousif bin Abdulrahman Fakhro ( Yousif Al Aoud) insisted that she doesn't leave Bahrain as he loved her and always wanted her close to him.

In his house in Qatar which remains till date after the State of Qatar decided to renovate it part of the full renovation of 2006 of Souq Waqif, and the house now named as Bayt Fakhro by HH Shaikh Hamad bin Khalifa Al Thani (the father Amir), it was known that on average 4 times a week HH Shaikh Abdulla bin Jassim Al Thani used to have his afternoon naps in Bayt Fakhro in the top room named by him as the (GHURAIFA).

Mohamed, remained commuting between both Bahrain and Qatar during his life. It was also known that whenever Shaikh Abdulla bin Jassim Al Thani and Shaikh Ali bin Abdulla Al Thani Ruler of Qatari at the time visited Bahrain on official or non official trips he would only stay at the House of Mohamed bin Abdulrahman Fakhro due to their close relationship and the respect they hold for each other. And refuses to stay at the Amiri Palace.

== Later life ==
Later in life, he was in charge of overseeing the education of the sons and nephews of Sheikh Abdullah bin Jasssim Al Thani, Sheikh Ahmad bin Ali Al Thani, Sheikh Khalifa bin Hamad Al Thani, Sheikh Suhaim bin Hamad Al Thani, Sheikh Mohammed bin Hamad Al Thani; Sheikh Khalid bin Hamad bin Abdullah Al Thani, as well as others. While less involved in politics, he continued to enjoy strong relationships with the Rulers and Sheikhs of Qatar up until his death. Sheikh Salman bin Hamad bin Isa Al Khalifa and the late Emir Sheikh. Isa bin Salman Al Khalifa, both rulers of Bahrain, also continued to hold him as a man of wisdom and a trusted advisor.

== His origins ==
Mohammed bin Abdulrahman belongs to the Al-Hassan branch from Al-Fakhro family which is attributed to the Banu-Tamim tribe. This family is considered to be highly respected by the leaders of the GCC as well as other families and tribes; they are Sunni Arabs. Some members of this family have played major roles in the political, economic, and social lives of the GCC. In addition, they are considered to be very close to the ruling families in Qatar, Bahrain, Saudi Arabia, and the United Arab Emirates.

== Progeny ==
He had nine sons: Dr. Ali (Former Minister of Health and Education in Bahrain); Dr. Hassan, Jassim (died 2001); Abdulaziz, Khalid (Advisor to Bahrain Prime Minister Court); Abdulrahman (Businessman), Adnan (Undersecretary–Bahrain Ministry of Electricity and Water); Yousif (Businessman); Jamal (Deputy Chairman Shura Council - Bahrain); and one daughter, Noora Fakhro.
