= Hamad bin Khalid Al Thani =

Chief of Qatari police force

- حمد بن خالد آل ثاني
- Born: 1952; Doha, Qatar
- Died: 13 September 2012 (aged 59 or 60); Doha, Qatar
- Occupations: Chief of Qatari police force, Founder and owner of HBK, Founder of HKH
- Children: 10
- Father: Khalid bin Hamad bin Abdullah Al Thani

Hamad bin Khalid bin Hamad bin Abdullah Al Thani (Arabic: حمد بن خالد بن حمد بن عبد الله آل ثاني) (1952 – 13 September 2012) was a Qatari entrepreneur and chief of the Qatari police forces. He was a member of the House of Thani and cousin of Emir Hamad bin Khalifa Al Thani.

== Early life and education ==
Hamad Al Thani was born in 1952 at the Al Rayyan Palace in Doha, Qatar. He was the eldest child of Sheikh Khalid bin Hamad bin Abdullah Al Thani and Sheikha Mariam. After a coup, his uncle Khalifa bin Hamad Al Thani became the 8th emir of Qatar, and appointed his father as the minister of interior in 1972, where he remained until 1989. Through his father, Hamad Al Thani was also a great-grandson of Emir Abdullah bin Jassim Al Thani, and a first cousin of Emir Hamad bin Khalifa Al Thani.

Hamad Al Thani began his education in Qatar and later attended Sandhurst Military Academy in England.

== Career ==
Hamad Al Thani served as deputy commander of the Qatar armed forces from 1973 to 1978, later assuming the role of chief of the Qatari police forces until 1988.

In 1973, he founded the company Hamad Bin Khalid Power Cleaning (HBK Power Cleaning W.L.L). Additionally, in 1995, he co-established a construction company named HKH General Contracting W.L.L with a business partner.

HKH General Contractors, now known as HKH Contracting, became a prominent player in the construction market under the management of Sheikh Hamad's son, Sheikh Abdulrahman bin Hamad Al Thani. The company undertook various government and private construction projects, particularly focused on city infrastructure enhancements in preparation for the FIFA World Cup in 2022. However, in 2018, amid the blockade on Qatar, HKH Contracting was reacquired by its majority owner, Sheikh Khalid Bin Hamad Al Thani, Sheikh Hamad's father. Subsequently, the company was liquidated, sparking controversy over its impact on approximately 3,000 employees.

== Personal life ==
Sheikh Hamad was the eldest son of Sheikh Khalid bin Hamad bin Abdullah Al Thani and was married and had four sons and six daughters. Sheikh Hamad had lung cancer and died in 2012; he was buried in the Sheikhs' graveyard opposite to his fathers palace in Al Rayyan district of Doha.
