= Hamad bin Jassim bin Jaber Al Thani =

Prime minister of Qatar, 2007 to 2013

His Highness Sheikh Hamad bin Jassim bin Jaber Al Thani
- حمد بن جاسم بن جبر آل ثاني
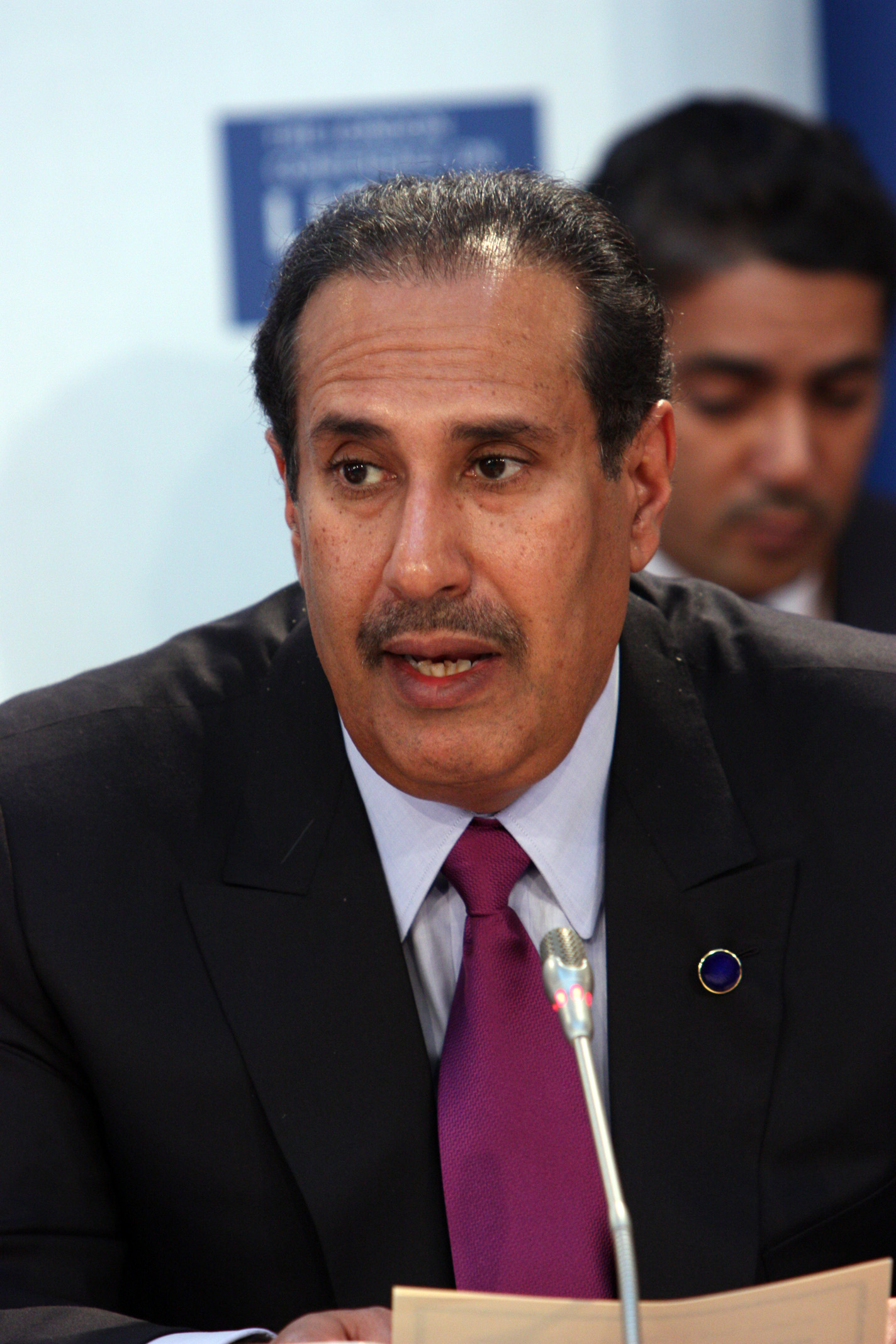
- Hamad in 2011

4th Prime Minister of Qatar
- In office 3 April 2007 – 26 June 2013
- Monarchs: Hamad bin Khalifa; Tamim bin Hamad
- Deputy: Abdullah bin Hamad
- Preceded by: Abdullah bin Khalifa
- Succeeded by: Abdullah bin Nasser

Deputy Prime Minister of Qatar
- In office 2003–2007
- Monarch: Hamad bin Khalifa Al Thani
- Preceded by: Mohammed bin Khalifa Al Thani
- Succeeded by: Abdullah bin Hamad Al Attiyah

Minister of Foreign Affairs
- In office 11 January 1992 – 26 June 2013
- Prime Minister: Khalifa bin Hamad; Hamad bin Khalifa; Abdullah bin Khalifa
- Preceded by: Mubarak Ali Al Khater
- Succeeded by: Khalid bin Mohammad

Personal details
- Born: 30 August 1959 (age 67) Doha, Qatar
- Spouses: Jawaher bint Fahad Al Thani (m. 1982) Noor bint Abdulaziz Al Subaie (m. 1996)
- Children: 5

Hamad bin Jassim bin Jaber bin Mohammed bin Thani Al Thani (Arabic: حمد بن جاسم بن جبر آل ثاني; born 1959), also known informally by his initials HBJ, is a Qatari politician. He was the Prime Minister of Qatar from 3 April 2007 to 26 June 2013, and foreign minister from 11 January 1992 to 26 June 2013.

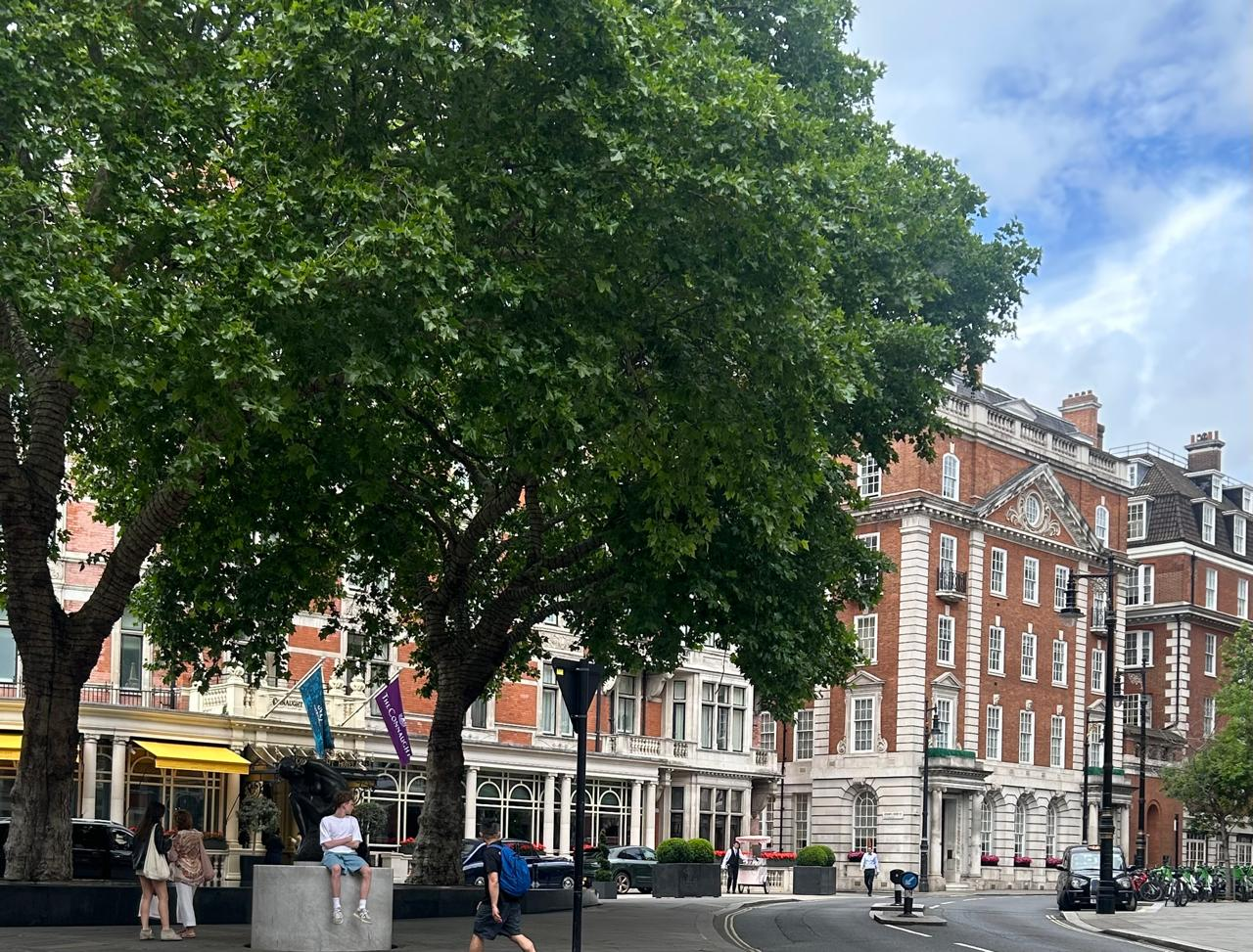
HBJ's vast fortune includes the historic Connaught Hotel situated in London's Mayfair (seen here in front of Tadao Ando's fountain 'Silence' and besides Mayfair House)

== Early life ==
Hamad was born in Doha, Qatar, on 30 August 1959. He is the fifth son of Jassim bin Jaber Al Thani. Through his father, he is the grandson of Jaber bin Mohammed Al Thani. Jaber was a younger brother of Jassim bin Mohammed Al Thani, the founding father of modern Qatar.

== Career ==
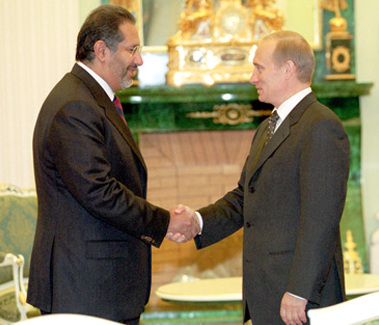
Hamad and Russian President Vladimir Putin at the Kremlin, 2000

Between 1982 and 1989, Hamad was the director of the office of the minister of municipal affairs and agriculture. In July 1989, he was appointed minister of municipal affairs and agriculture and in May 1990, he was appointed deputy minister of electricity and water along with his post as minister of municipal affairs and agriculture, where he supervised several successful projects and developed the agriculture sector.

On 1 September 1992, Hamad was appointed as foreign minister of Qatar by Emir Khalifa bin Hamad Al Thani. He retained his post when the Emir's son, Hamad bin Khalifa Al Thani came to power in a coup in 1995. Hamad played an important role in the overthrow of Khalifa bin Hamad Al Thani. On 16 September 2003, Hamad was appointed first deputy prime minister while retaining his position of minister of foreign affairs. On 2 April 2007, he was appointed as prime minister, following the resignation of Abdullah bin Khalifa Al Thani; Hamad also continued to serve as foreign minister. Hamad had vast foreign policy goals for Qatar during his tenure.

Hamad was reported to have had strong connections with the US government. He serves on the International Advisory Council of the Brookings Institution and chairs the International Advisory Council of the Brookings Doha Center. He has stakes in many strong businesses such as Qatar Airways and the Foreign Investment Company, Qatari Diar Real Estate Investment Company, The Pearl Island and Harrods. He is a partner in Project Grande (Guernsey), the developer of One Hyde Park in London.

Additionally, Hamad held several other key positions including member of the supreme defense council, which was established in 1996; head of Qatar's permanent committee for the support of al Quds, which was formed in 1998; member of the permanent constitution committee, formed in 1999; member of the ruling family council, which was established in 2000; and member of the supreme council for the investment of the reserves of the state, which was established in 2000.

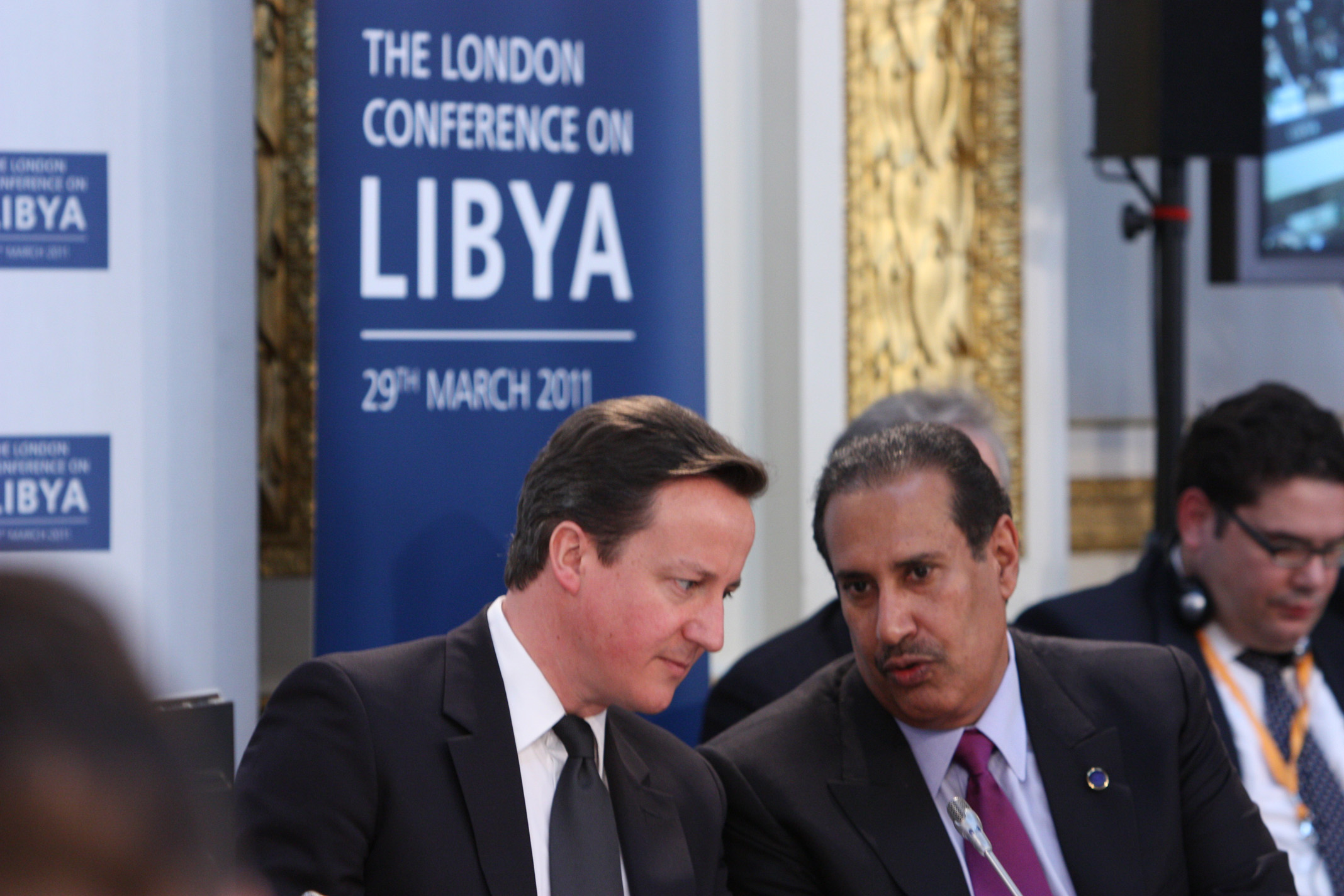
Hamad and British Prime Minister David Cameron in 2011

A May 2008 diplomatic cable sent by then U.S. chargé d'affaires in Doha, alluded to a dispute between Hamad and the Qatari intelligence officials over a Qatari senior bank official imprisoned for 6 months over his role in funding Khalid Sheikh Mohammed (KSM), the al-Qaeda mastermind of September 11. The senior bank official was Khalifa Muhammad Turki al-Subaiy who financed KSM while working at Qatar Central Bank. The French government made Qatar under Hamad's guidance a strategic partner, and the list of partnerships between the two states includes Total, EADS, Technip, Air Liquide, Vinci SA, GDF Suez, and Areva. France was, during the Hamad government, the primary arms supplier to Qatar. In February 2009, under the Sarkozy government, France accorded special beyond-OCDE investment privileges to Qatar, its ruling family and its State-Owned Enterprises; one example of the privileges is capital gains exemptions in France.

The US embassy to Doha claimed, in a cable leaked in December 2010, that "Sheikh Hamad told then US senator John Kerry that he had proposed a bargain with the Egyptian president, Hosni Mubarak, which involved stopping broadcasts in Egypt in exchange for a change in Cairo's position on Israel-Palestinian negotiations, and that 'we would stop al-Jazeera for a year' if Mubarak agreed in that span of time to deliver a lasting settlement for the Palestinians."

On 25 June 2013, Hamad bin Khalifa Al Thani abdicated as Emir of Qatar, and on the next day, 26 June, Hamad resigned from office. Some have questioned whether this was because the new emir pulled him from his post after realizing how much power he had amassed. He was replaced by Abdullah bin Nasser bin Khalifa Al Thani as prime minister and by Khalid bin Mohammad Al Attiyah as foreign minister. On 3 July, Hamad was also relieved from the post of deputy head of the Qatar Investment Authority (QIA).

It was under Hamad that Qatar began assisting rebels in Syria by supplying them with arms. This move brought criticism upon Qatar, as some questioned whether these arms ultimately ended up in the wrong hands.

In June 2021, High Court of Justice in London issued a claim, according to which Hamad bin Jassim's private office was at the heart of clandestine routes by which money was transferred to an Al-Qaeda affiliate in Syria, the Al-Nusra Front.

In March 2022 Hamad bin Jassim said to a Qatari television that the Military Operations Command in Jordan and Turkey have spent $2 trillion to remove Syria's President Bashar al-Assad.

=== Mediation efforts ===
Hamad has worked actively to settle political conflicts in both Africa and the Middle East over the last 20 years.

Hamad facilitated the agreement that led to a unity constitution in Yemen in May 1990, ratified by the populace in May 1991. It affirmed Yemen's commitment to free elections, a multiparty political system, the right to own private property, equality under the law, and respect of basic human rights. Parliamentary elections were held on 27 April 1993.

In 1996, he worked to settle a brief war between Eritrea and Yemen over the Hanish Islands. As part of the agreement to cease hostilities the two nations agreed, through the negotiating effort of Hamad, to refer the issue to the Permanent Court of Arbitration at The Hague in 1998. Yemen was granted full ownership of the larger islands while Eritrea was awarded the peripheral islands to the southwest of the larger islands. Since then relations between the two governments have remained relatively normal.

Hamad was instrumental in creating the peace settlement between Sudan and Eritrea in 1998. The un-demarcated border with Sudan had posed a problem for Eritrean external relations for most of the nation's existence. He negotiated a peace settlement between Sudan and Eritrea. After the agreement was signed, relations somewhat normalized.

In 2007, Hamad helped organize the Lebanese national dialogue and the peace agreement between various Lebanese political groups to end the worst internal fighting in Lebanon since the civil war of 1975–1990. In an attempt to resolve a broader political showdown that had paralyzed the country for 18 months, Hamad summoned the Lebanese government and Hezbollah-led opposition to Qatar for talks. He declared an agreement sponsored by the Arab League to deal with the Lebanese crisis. In the agreement the parties pledged, “to refrain from returning to the use of weapons or violence to realize political gains." The Lebanese government furthermore committed itself to introduce a new electoral law designed to provide better representation in the country's sectarian system of power sharing.

He participated in mediation of ceasefire in Yemen between the Government of Yemen and the Houthi Movement in 2007. In 2010, the two parties agreed to activate the agreement after confrontations threatening the ceasefire. The mediation ended a six-year war between the two sides.

In 2009, Hamad participated in brokering a peace agreement to end the conflict in Darfur (The "Goodwill and Confidence Building Pact") between the government of Sudan and Justice and Equality Movement. The pact also opened up to the rest of factions in Darfur.

In 2009, he assisted in the settlement agreement between Sudan and Chad. The civil war in Chad began in December 2005. On February 8, 2006 the Tripoli Agreement was signed, which temporarily stopped the fighting. However, hostilities resumed after two months, leading to several new agreement attempts and a final settlement between the two parties in 2009.

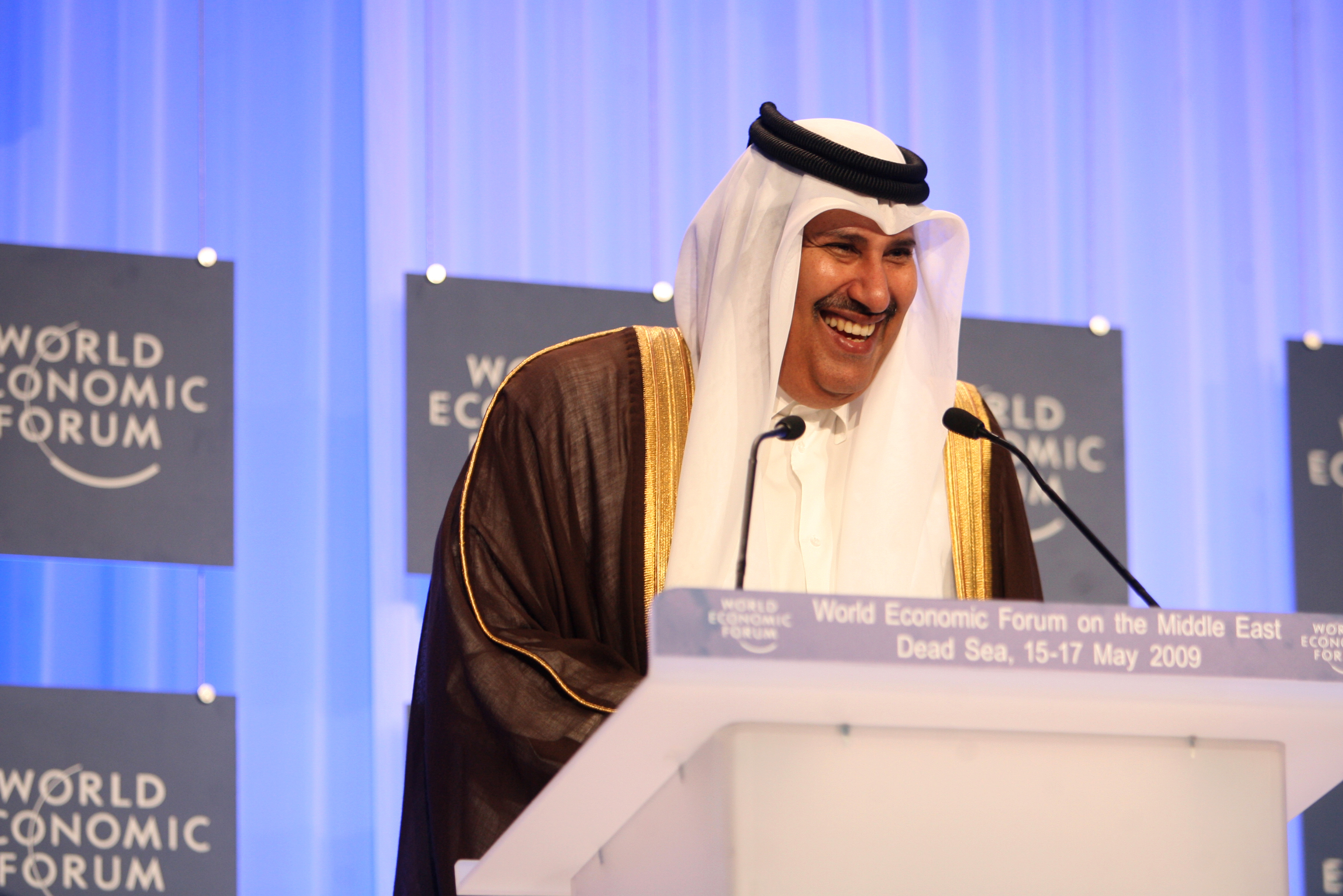
Hamad bin Jassim bin Jaber al-Thani delivers a speech at the World Economic Forum on the Middle East at the Dead Sea in Jordan, May 15, 2009

In 2010, he led the mediation efforts that resulted in the signing of a peace agreement between Djibouti and Eritrea to settle their border dispute and thereby paving the way for broader peace talks to end the six-year conflict in the region. According to the negotiated peace declaration, the two parties pledged to give peaceful means a "strategic priority to settle the conflict in Darfur", and to take the required measures to create "an opportune environment to achieve a lasting settlement", including the halting of "inconvenience to the displaced and ensuring the flow of relief aid". The parties furthermore committed themselves to prisoners swap and the release of those who were detained due to the dispute.

Hamad also has been involved in ongoing efforts between Fatah and Hamas to achieve Palestinian reconciliation to activate the peace process with Israel.

He has facilitated the release of prisoners, including the five Lebanese prisoners in Eritrea. He supported the effort to release Nawaz Sharif, the former Prime Minister of Pakistan from jail, and was instrumental in freeing the Bulgarian nurses in Libya from prison. He has opened Qatar to political refugees in the Muslim and Arab worlds. During the Bosnian conflict of the 1990s, he secured large quantities of food, medicine and other items to the Bosnian population.

In November 2010 he launched the Humanitarian Appeal 2011 in Doha, together with the United Nations Office for the Coordination of Humanitarian Affairs (OCHA) and the United Nations High Commissioner for Refugees (UNHCR). The initiative was set to help improve the living conditions for millions of people affected by humanitarian crises around the world. The initiative was attended by 85 representatives of 85 representatives from EU Member States, the European Commission, the Council of the European Union, beneficiary countries, UN and NGOs.

== Legal issues ==
=== BAE Systems ===
Following courting by Michael Portillo, Qatar entered into an arms deal worth £500 million with BAE Systems. £7 million was transferred into two trusts in Jersey of which Hamad was named as a beneficiary. In an attempt to prevent money laundering, the funds were frozen from 16 July 2000 by the Jersey Financial Services Commission, who then began a court case and investigation. Hamad paid the Jersey authorities £6 million as a "voluntary reparation" as "the structures put in place by his advisers may have contributed to the cost and complexity of the inquiry." The case was then dropped by the Jersey authorities.

=== Heritage Oil ===
In June 2014, Hamad acquired 80% of Heritage Oil, which was listed as a London exploration and production company. At the same time, he was listed as a "Counsellor" at the Qatari embassy and as such was privileged to legal immunity under the 1961 Vienna Convention. Article 42 of this convention states that "a diplomat shall not in the receiving State practise for personal profit any professional or commercial activity" thereby disallowing the acquisition. The stake, valued at £924 million and dated April 30, 2014, transferred to a "wholly owned subsidiary" of Al-Mirqab Capital, an investment company privately owned by Hamad and his family. His lawyers maintain that the fact that the company was listed in London is not sufficient evidence to determine that Article 42 had been violated.

=== Paradise Papers ===
In November 2017 an investigation conducted by the International Consortium of Investigative Journalism cited his name in the list of politicians named in the Paradise Papers.

=== Positions and opinions ===
At a 2015 speech at the Chatham House, a London-based think tank, Hamad warned the Israelis, reminding them that they are surrounded by 400 million Arabs, saying "you have the upper hand now but you are surrounded. Accept the 1967 boundaries, the two state solution. Your superiority will not last forever. Solve (the Palestinian question) and terrorism is defused."

=== El Corte Inglés ===
In 2010 Hamad acquired 10% of El Corte Inglés in Spain, the country's largest department store chain. For this transaction he used a local "figurehead", David Barreiro Nogaledo, who was investigated by the Regional Court in Madrid for a potential case of Money Laundering and misappropiation. The same "figurehead" tried to make Hamad invest, in 2019, in another Spanish Company, Laboratorios Larrasa, accused afterwards of Fraud in Spain and Brazil.

=== Psychic theft ===
In 2022, Hamad was the victim of a $90 million jewellery theft. The incident, kept largely out of the media until mid-2023, came to light when a rare pink diamond was pulled from a Christie's auction in New York. The theft was carried out through a years-long manipulation of Al Thani's personal assistant, referred to as "Magdalena" in US court documents. She was deceived by a man posing as a psychic named "Giovanni", who persuaded her to send 17 uninsured pieces of Al Thani's jewellery by mail for “spiritual cleansing.” The man, later identified as John Lee, was arrested by the FBI in November 2022. Investigations revealed that Lee had profited from psychic services and later scaled the grift after learning of Magdalena's high-profile employer. The FBI recovered much of the stolen jewellery, including the altered pink diamond.

== Business and wealth ==
Hamad bin Jassim bin Jaber Al Thani is one of the richest people in the world, having overseen Qatar's $230 billion sovereign wealth fund until 2013. He has been named "the man who bought London" by British tabloids; his holdings in London include the Shard, Harrods, and the InterContinental London Park Lane. It was reported that Hamad bin Jassim bin Jaber Al Thani bought Banque Internationale à Luxembourg and KBL European Private Bankers via Precision Capital, making one of the largest banking groups in Luxembourg.

According to the U.S. Securities and Exchange Commission filing, he also owns 3.05% shares of the Deutsche Bank, via Paramount Services Holdings Limited; his relative, Hamad bin Khalifa Al Thani (former emir of Qatar), via another company Supreme Universal Holdings, owns 3.05% of the shares. Part of Hamad bin Khalifa's stake was sold by Hamad bin Jassim bin Jaber.

In May 2015, Hamad purchased Picasso's Les Femmes d'Alger (Version O) for $179.4 million including fees, a record price for a painting at auction. He also owns a super-yacht, the Al Mirqab, worth $300 million.

In 2021, the Sunday Times Rich List estimated his net worth at £2 billion.

In 2025, Hamad was involved in a high-profile legal and public relations dispute with Irish property magnate Paddy McKillen.

Multiple news reports and arbitration-industry sources indicate that during late 2025 McKillen was awarded between £700 million and £800 million in arbitration against Hamad and associated Qatari owners in relation to the deferred-payment dispute, with the award described as one of the largest of its kind.

=== RICO Claim and Hacking Allegations ===
In September 2025, Patrick McKillen and his firm filed a federal RICO lawsuit alleging that Hamad, members of his family, and associated Qatari entities orchestrated an extensive hacking and intimidation scheme targeting McKillen’s devices, personal data, and communications to pressure him into abandoning financial claims; the complaint also asserts that this cyber-intrusion campaign formed part of a broader effort to defraud McKillen by inducing him to manage and redevelop luxury-hotel assets while secretly intending to withhold the promised compensation.

=== Use of Private Aircraft by US president ===
In May 2025, reports emerged that US president Donald Trump was considering acquiring a Boeing 747-8 aircraft owned by Hamad. The aircraft, bearing the tail number P4-HBJ, was originally delivered to Qatar Amiri Flight in 2012 but later transferred to Global Jet Isle of Man and used privately by Hamad after his retirement from political office. Although some media initially described the jet as a "gift from Qatar," subsequent reporting clarified that the aircraft was no longer owned by the Qatari state but was instead part of Hamad’s private portfolio of assets. The incident drew criticism from observers and protest groups, who highlighted Hamad's past support for Hamas and alleged misuse of wealth and political influence following his departure from government service.

== Donations ==
In June 2022, The Times reported that between 2011 and 2015 Prince Charles accepted €3 million in cash from Hamad. The funds were said to be in the form of €500 notes, handed over in person in three tranches, in a suitcase, holdall and Fortnum & Mason carrier bags. Charles' meetings with Hamad did not appear in the Court Circular. Coutts collected the cash and each payment was deposited into the accounts of The Prince of Wales's Charitable Fund. A Clarence House spokesperson stated that the appropriate covenants were carried out, and it was the "donor's choice" to make the donations in cash, after which the trustees "discussed the governance and donor relationship" and the auditors "signed off on the donation after a specific enquiry during the audit". There is no evidence that the payments were illegal or that it was not intended for the money to go to the charity. The Charity Commission for England and Wales announced they would review the information and determine if "there is any role for the Commission in this matter".

== Honours ==
- Knight Grand Cross of the Order of Merit of the Italian Republic (16 November 2010, Italy).
- Honorary Doctorate in Humane Letters from the Lebanese American University (28 April 2010, Lebanon).

== Personal life ==
In 1982, Hamad married Sheikha Jawaher bint Fahad Al Thani. He subsequently married Sheikha Noor bint Abdulaziz Al Subaie, the daughter of the former minister of education, in 1996 as his second wife.

He has 5 children, 4 sons and 1 daughter.

- Sheikh Jaber bin Hamad Al Thani
- Sheikh Mohammed bin Hamad Al Thani
- Sheikh Fahad bin Hamad Al Thani
- Sheikh Tamim bin Hamad Al Thani
- Sheikha Maryam bint Hamad Al Thani

Political offices
Preceded by Abdullah bin Khalifa Al Thani	Prime Minister of Qatar; 2007–2013	Succeeded by Abdullah bin Nasser bin Khalifa Al Thani
