= Abdullah bin Khalifa Al Thani =

Prime minister of Qatar (1996–2007)

His Excellency Abdullah bin Khalifa Al Thani
- عبد الله بن خليفة آل ثاني

3rd Prime Minister of Qatar
- In office 29 October 1996 – 3 April 2007
- Monarch: Hamad bin Khalifa
- Deputy: Hamad bin Jassim
- Preceded by: Hamad bin Khalifa
- Succeeded by: Hamad bin Jassim

Deputy Prime Minister of Qatar
- In office July 1995 – October 1996
- Monarch: Hamad bin Khalifa Al Thani
- Succeeded by: Mohammed bin Khalifa Al Thani

Personal details
- Born: 25 December 1959 (age 65) Doha, Qatar
- Parent(s): Khalifa bin Hamad Al Thani; Rudha bint Jassim Al Thani

Abdullah bin Khalifa Al Thani (Arabic: عبد الله بن خليفة آل ثاني) was Prime Minister of Qatar from 29 October 1996 to 3 April 2007. He served as an advisor to the Emir and often represented him at ceremonial events and receptions.

== Early years and education ==
Abdullah Al Thani is the eldest son of Emir Khalifa bin Hamad Al Thani, and his third wife, Sheikha Rudha bint Jassim bin Jabr Al Thani. He is the third son of his father. Sheikh Abdullah is the younger half-brother of Hamad bin Khalifa Al Thani, the former Emir of Qatar.

Sheikh Abdullah received his school education in Qatar, earning his secondary school certificate in 1975, and graduating from the Royal Military Academy Sandhurst in December 1976.

== Career ==
After graduation Abdullah joined the armed forces of Qatar and held many senior military posts up to 1989 when he was appointed assistant commander-in-chief of the armed forces, with the rank of lieutenant colonel. In 1979 Abdullah was appointed chairman of Qatar Olympic Committee, and held this post until 1989.

On 17 July 1989, he was named minister of the interior. In addition to this post on 11 July 1995 he became deputy prime minister. On 29 October 1996, he was appointed prime minister and continued to assume his interior portfolio until 2 January 2001. On 3 April 2007, he resigned and was replaced by Foreign Minister Hamad bin Jassem bin Jabr Al Thani as prime minister.

== Personal life ==
Abdullah owns several racehorses and as of 2012 he won EUR 2,070,043.78 in prize money.

Political offices
Preceded by Hamad bin Khalifa Al Thani	Prime Minister of Qatar; 1996–2007	Succeeded by Hamad bin Jassim Al Thani
Preceded by New Title	Minister of Interior of Qatar; 1989–2001	Succeeded by Abdullah bin Khalid Al Thani
