= Khalid bin Khalifa bin Abdul Aziz Al Thani =

Prime minister of Qatar (2020–2023)

His Highness Sheikh Khalid bin Khalifa bin Abdul Aziz Al Thani
- خالد بن خليفة بن عبد العزيز آل ثاني
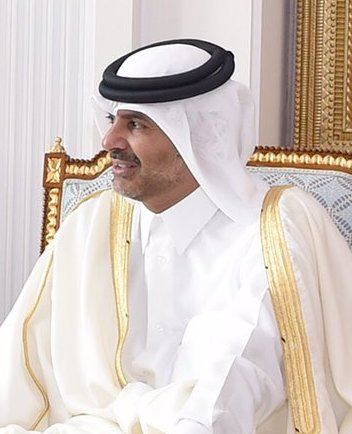
- Sheikh Khalid in 2020

6th Prime Minister of Qatar
- In office 28 January 2020 – 7 March 2023
- Monarch: Tamim bin Hamad Al Thani
- Preceded by: Abdullah bin Nasser bin Khalifa Al Thani
- Succeeded by: Mohammed bin Abdulrahman bin Jassim Al Thani

Minister of the Interior
- In office 28 January 2020 – 7 March 2023
- Monarch: Tamim bin Hamad Al Thani
- Preceded by: Abdullah bin Nasser
- Succeeded by: Khalifa bin Hamad bin Khalifa Al Thani

Chief of the Amiri Diwan
- In office 11 November 2014 – 27 January 2020
- Monarch: Tamim bin Hamad Al Thani

Personal details
- Born: 1968 (age 57–58) Doha, Qatar

Sheikh Khalid bin Khalifa bin Abdul Aziz Al Thani (Arabic: خالد بن خليفة بن عبد العزيز آل ثاني; born 1968) is a Qatari politician who has served as Prime Minister and interior minister from 28 January 2020 to 7 March 2023.

A member of the ruling Al Thani family, he previously served as Chief of the Amiri Diwan from 2014 to 2020.

== Early life and education ==
Sheikh Khalid was born in Doha in 1968. He went to school in Doha and then to the United States where he completed his bachelor's degree in Business Administration in 1993.

== Career ==
Sheikh Khalid began his career in the Qatar Liquefied Gas Company Limited where he worked until 2002. He then worked at the office of the First Deputy Prime Minister and the Minister of Foreign Affairs from 2002 to 2006. In March 2006, Sheikh Khalid joined the Amiri Diwan. On 11 July 2006, he was appointed as director of the office of the Private Secretary of the heir apparent Sheikh Tamim bin Hamad Al Thani. On 9 January 2007, he was appointed director of the Office of Sheikh Tamim. Before becoming prime minister, he served as chief of the Amiri Diwan from 11 November 2014 to 27 January 2020. On 28 January 2020, he was appointed prime minister following and the Minister of interior following Sheikh Abdullah bin Nasser al-Thani's resignation.

On 7 March 2023, Sheikh Khalid was replaced as prime minister by Sheikh Mohammed bin Abdulrahman bin Jassim Al Thani, and as interior minister by Sheikh Khalifa bin Hamad bin Khalifa Al Thani.

== Honors ==
Emir Tamim bin Hamad Al Thani awarded the Hamad Bin Khalifa Sash to HE Sheikh Khalid bin Khalifa bin Abdulaziz Al Thani, in recognition of his valuable efforts in serving the country.

== Personal life ==
Sheikh Khalid Bin Khalifa Al Thani is married and has 4 children.

Political offices
Preceded by Abdullah bin Nasser bin Khalifa Al Thani	Prime Minister of Qatar; 2020–2023	Succeeded by Mohammed bin Abdulrahman bin Jassim Al Thani
