= Khalifa Muhammad Turki al-Subaiy =

Qatari al-Qaeda facilitator and financier (born 1965)

Khalifa Muhammad Turki al-Subaiy (also known as Khalifa Mohamed Turki Alsubaie or Khalifa Turki bin Mohamed Alsubaie), born January 1, 1965, is a Qatari al-Qaeda facilitator and financier, and as such al-Subaiy has been sanctioned by numerous countries and organizations including the United Nations and U.S. government.

== Career ==
Al Subaiy is a former employee of the state-owned Qatar Central Bank. He now heads the office of institutional management plans at Barwa Group, a real estate company based out of Doha.

== Terrorist and extremist connections ==
Al-Subaiy has been engaged in terror-support and financing since at least early 2003. He has been accused by the United States Government of lending support to Khalid Sheikh Mohammad, the mastermind of the September 11th attacks on the World Trade Center, as well as "providing support to al-Qaeda senior leadership in Pakistan's tribal region". Al-Subaiy has also worked to move extremist recruits to al-Qaeda training facilities in Pakistan and South Asia. Furthermore, al-Subaiy has been described as a functioning "diplomatic and communications conduit" between the terror group and third parties across the Middle East.

Al-Subaiy also holds ties to Abd al Malik Muhammad Yusuf Uthman Abd al Salam (also known as Umar al-Qatari), and Ashraf Muhammad Yusuf Uthman Abd al-Salam. Al-Qatari, also a U.S. designated financier, helped al-Subaiy transfer tens of thousands of euros (raised on the internet) to al-Qaeda officials. Ashraf Abd al-Salam, an Al-Nusra Front fighter in Syria as of 2014, coordinated with al-Subaiy to move hundreds of thousands of dollars for al-Qaeda.

Khalifa al-Subaiy has also been linked to Abd al-Rahman bin Umayr al-Nuaymi. Nuaymi is one of the three founding of Alkarama, an alleged human rights advocacy organization. Nuaymi, along with another founding member, has been designated by the U.S. government as a financier for al-Qaeda.

On January 12, 2013, al-Subaiy endorsed and solicited donations for the fundraising campaign, Madad Ahl al-Sham, using his personal Facebook account. Madad was a private, Qatari, purported charity that worked to raise funds and supplies for al-Nusra Front. It was once cited by members of the Front as "one of the preferred conduits for donations" in August 2012. The Front openly endorsed the ‘charity' in two separate Twitter postings, which were later reposted and shared by Madad Ahl al-Sham's own account.

In a Facebook posting in May, 2013 the organization announced it would be expanding its campaign to collect weapons, the post was accompanied by a video endorsement by Sheikh Wagdy Ghoneim. Ghoneim is an Egyptian cleric who was forced to leave the United States by Immigration services after it alleged he participated in fundraising activities for terrorist organizations.

== 2008 arrest and controversy ==
In January 2008, al-Subaiy was tried and convicted in absentia by the High Criminal Court of Bahrain for "financing terrorism, undergoing terrorism training and facilitating the travel others abroad to receive terrorist training, and for membership in a terrorist organization". In March of the same year he was arrested in Qatar.

A diplomatic cable sent in May by the then charges d'affairs Michael Ratney revealed that the Qatari Prime Minister at the time, Hamad bin Jassim bin Jaber Al-Thani, was heavily involved in the handling of al-Subaiy's case from "very early on". The cable goes on to suggest that the case itself was a point of contention between al-Thani and Qatari intelligence agencies, stating it "had been a major bilateral irritant for over a year". So much so that Ratney advised Secretary of the Treasury Henry Paulson that raising the issue to the Qatari's should "be limited to thanking [them] for their cooperation on the case" and "that any more detailed discussion…should be done through the Qatari Attorney General and intelligence service, and not with [al-Thani]."

On June 5, 2008, al-Subaiy, along with two other individuals named Abd al-Rahman Muhammad Jaffar Ali and Adil Muhammad Mahmud Abd al-Khaliq, was designated by the U.S. Department of Treasury for "providing financial and material support to al-Qaeda."

Al-Subaiy was released in September that same year; he spent a total of only six months in jail. One month after his release, he designated by the United Nations on October 10 as an al-Qaeda financier and facilitator.

Despite being assured by the Qatari government that he was "under control" and that all his accounts were being "monitored/controlled by the Central Bank" (his former employer), in 2012 Subaiy was once more implicated in terror-financing activities. Allegedly working with two Jordanians (with Qatari national IDs), Subaiy transferred hundreds of thousands of dollars to Al-Qaeda in Pakistan.

Al-Subaiy is believed to be currently living and operating freely in Doha, while continuing to finance and support Islamic terror in both Iraq and Syria. The Qatari government has repeatedly refused to comment on the status of al-Subaiy as well as many other U.S. designated financiers of terror.

== International terrorist designations ==
Country/organization	Date
United States of America	6/5/2008
United Nations	10/10/2008
United Kingdom	10/16/2008
Australia	2/20/2015
Israel	1/2/2013
European Union (all member countries)	10/10/2008
Japan	10/10/2008
South Korea	10/10/2008
Russia	10/10/2008
