= Mohammed bin Khalifa Al Thani =

Member of the royal family of Qatar (born 1965)

Deputy Prime Minister of Qatar
- In office January 1998 – September 2003
- Preceded by: Abdullah bin Khalifa Al Thani

Minister of Finance, Economy and Trade
- In office 1995–1998
- Preceded by: Abdullah bin Hamad Al Attiyah
- Succeeded by: Yousef Hussain Kamal Al Emadi

Personal details
- Born: 1965 (age 60–61)

Mohammed bin Khalifa Al Thani is a member of the royal family of Qatar, the House of Thani.

He was born in Doha in 1965. He is a younger half-brother of former emir Hamad bin Khalifa Al Thani.

He graduated from George Washington University with a bachelor's degree in public administration and political science. In August 1989 he took the position of an under-secretary in the ministry of finance and petroleum.

He was appointed minister of finance, economy and trade between 1995 and 1998. On 20 January 1998 he was appointed deputy prime minister. He held that office until 2003.

In 2011 he purchased the Haras des Cruchettes stables in Le Ménil-Vicomte as part of his Al Shahania Stud.
