= Khalid bin Hamad Al Thani (born 1935) =

Qatari politician (born 1935)

- Born: 1935 (age 89–90); Doha, Qatar
- House: Thani
- Father: Hamad bin Abdullah Al Thani
- Mother: Sara bint Mohammed Al Thani
- Occupation: Minister the Interior (1972–1989)

Khalid bin Hamad bin Abdullah bin Jassim bin Muhammed Al Thani (Arabic: خالد بن حمد بن عبد الله آل ثاني; born 1935 in Doha) is a former Minister of Interior of Qatar, which he served as from 1972 to 1989.

He is the son of Sheikh Hamad bin Abdullah Al Thani and Sheikha Sara bint Mohammed Al Thani and the grandson of Abdullah bin Jassim Al Thani and Mohammed bin Jassim Al Thani. After the coup of 1972 his half-brother Sheikh Khalifa bin Hamad Al Thani appointed him as the Minister of the Interior.

== Children ==
Sheikh Khalid has 11 daughters and 14 sons:

- Sheikh Hamad bin Khalid Al Thani, he has 2 sons and 3 daughters
- Sheikh Jassim bin Hamad Al Thani
- Sheikh Khalifa bin Hamad Al Thani
- Sheikha Noor bint Hamad Al Thani
- Sheikha Nouf bint hamad Al Thani
- Sheikha Sara bint hamad Al Thani
- Sheikh Mohammed bin Khalid Al Thani, State Minister and member of Cabinet. Married, 6 sons and 8 daughters
- Sheikh Abdullah bin Khalid Al Thani, he has 19 daughters and 23 sons
- Sheikh Abdulaziz bin Khalid Al Thani, married, 17 sons
- Sheikh Nasir bin Khalid Al Thani, chairman of QID, married, 2 sons and 6 daughters
- Sheikh Saud bin Khalid Al Thani, current president of Al-Rayyan SC, married, 5 sons and 5 daughters
- Sheikh Abdulrahman bin Khalid Al Thani, married, 4 sons and 3 daughters
- Sheikh Ahmed bin Khalid Al Thani, married, 2 sons and 3 daughters
- Sheikh Jassim bin Khalid Al Thani, married, 3 sons
- Sheikh Suhaim bin Khalid Al Thani, married, 2 sons and 2 daughters
- Sheikh Khalifa bin Khalid Al Thani
- Sheikh Falah bin Khalid Al Thani
- Sheikha Aisha bint Khalid Al Thani, Married to Sheikh Abdulrahman bin Hassan Alabdulrahman Al Thani, 2 sons and 4 daughters
- Sheikha Noora bint Khalid Al Thani, married to Emir Sheikh Hamad bin Khalifa Al Thani, 4 sons and 5 daughters
- Sheikha Jawahir bint Khalid Al Thani, married Sheikh Faysal bin Nasir bin Hamad Al Thani, 1 son and 1 daughter
- Sheikha Muna bint Khalid Al Thani, married, 3 daughters
- Sheikha Naila bint Khalid Al Thani, married, 1 son and 1 daughter
- Sheikha Sara bint Khalid Al Thani, she has 2 sons and 1 daughter
- Sheikha Maryam bint Khalid Al Thani
