= Abdullah bin Khalid Al Thani =

Former Minister of the Interior of Qatar

- Born: 1956 (age 69–70); Doha, Qatar
- Abdullah bin Khalid bin Hamad bin Abdullah bin Jassim Al Thani
- House: Thani
- Father: Khalid bin Hamad bin Abdullah Al Thani

Abdullah bin Khalid Al Thani (Arabic: الشيخ عبدالله بن خالد بن حمد آل ثاني; born 1956) is a Qatari statesman and a member of the Qatari royal family. He served as the minister of Islamic affairs from 1992 to 1995 and as the minister of interior from 1995 to 2013.

== Early life and education ==
Sheikh Abdullah was born in 1956 in Doha, Qatar, to Khalid bin Hamad bin Abdullah Al Thani. He is the second eldest son of Sheikh Khalid's twelve sons. After completing his education in Qatar, Sheikh Abdullah enrolled in the Royal Military Academy Sandhurst.

== Career ==
Upon graduating from RMA Sandhurst in 1977, Sheikh Abdullah returned to Qatar and was appointed lieutenant in the Qatari police. He left the police sometime during the reign of his uncle Emir Sheikh Khalifa bin Hamad Al Thani. Later in 1992 he was appointed minister of Islamic affairs, a post he held until 1995. During the reign of his cousin Sheikh Hamad bin Khalifa Al Thani, he was appointed minister of interior.

== Controversy ==
Earlier in his career, Al Thani served as Qatar's Minister of Islamic Affairs and Endowments. During this time, al-Qaeda operative Khalid Sheikh Mohammed, named "the principal architect of the 9/11 attacks," moved to Qatar "at the suggestion of the former minister of Islamic affairs of Qatar, Shaykh Abdallah Bin Khalid Bin Hamad al-Thani,” according to the U.S. Department of Defense.

In 1995, Abdullah bin Khalid al Thani is believed to have provided funding to Khalid Sheikh Mohammed to support him in combat in the Bosnian War.

While the U.S. pushed for Sheikh Mohammed's arrest, Abdullah bin Khalid Al Thani allegedly told Khalid Sheikh Mohammed about the growing pressure for his arrest, leading to him reportedly leaving the country with a Qatar-provided passport on a ‘government executive jet.’ After this, Sheikh Abdullah was "briefly confined to house arrest."

In a 2003 article by The New York Times, Sheikh Abdullah bin Khalid Al Thani is mentioned as "the same official who had repeatedly allowed Arab extremists who had fought in Afghanistan to live on his farm." The article also describes a Qatari government minister who housed “as many as 100 Arab extremists” on his Qatari farm in the mid-1990s.

Sheikh Abdallah's name was registered in the terrorist list during the Gulf crises in 2017. However, in 2023, the UAE removed his name from that list along with 58 other Qatari nationals and 12 entities.

Former U.S. Assistant Secretary of State for Political-Military Affairs Richard Clarke has also commented on Al Thani's ties to terrorism. While serving as Qatar's Interior Minister, Clarke said that Al Thani held sympathies for Osama bin Laden and terrorist groups and "was using his personal money and ministry money to transfer to Al Qaeda front groups that were allegedly charities." U.S. officials have also reportedly suggested that Al Thani provided shelter, fake documents, and other assistance as they traveled through Qatar. U.S. officials also said that Sheikh Abdallah was visited by Osama bin Laden himself between 1996 and 2000. Leaked U.S. government reports, for instance, revealed that Al Thani met with bin Laden during his January 1996 visit in Doha. Bin Laden was quoted reporting the "successful movements of explosives into Saudi Arabia" as well as the operations against U.S. and U.K. interests in Dammam, Dharan, and Khobar through the activities of clandestine Al Qaeda cells in Saudi Arabia.

== Personal life ==
Sheikh Abdullah has four wives. He has a total of 33 sons and daughters. He is the owner of the Al Waab Farm, which is a world renown Straight Egyptian Arabian Horse breeding farm. The farm is managed by his son, Sheikh Ahmed, a businessman and government official.

Since late 2003, Sheikh Abdullah has resided in a secluded estate on his 7,000 acres private farm in Waab Al Abareq, northern Qatar. Sheikh Abdullah rarely makes any public appearances.
