= Abdullah bin Nasser Al Thani (prime minister) =

Prime Minister of Qatar (2013–2020)

His Highness Sheikh Abdullah bin Nasser bin Khalifa Al Thani
- عبد الله بن ناصر بن خليفة آل ثاني
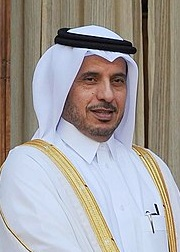
- Al Thani in 2016

5th Prime Minister of Qatar
- In office 26 June 2013 – 28 January 2020
- Monarch: Tamim bin Hamad Al Thani
- Deputy: Ahmad bin Abdullah Al Mahmoud
- Preceded by: Hamad bin Jassim bin Jaber Al Thani
- Succeeded by: Khalid bin Khalifa bin Abdul Aziz Al Thani

Minister of the Interior
- In office 26 June 2013 – 28 January 2020
- Monarch: Tamim bin Hamad Al Thani
- Preceded by: Abdullah bin Khalid Al Thani
- Succeeded by: Khalid bin Khalifa bin Abdul Aziz Al Thani

Minister of State for Interior Affairs
- In office 15 February 2005 – 26 June 2013
- Monarch: Hamad bin Khalifa Al Thani
- Prime Minister: Hamad bin Jassim bin Jaber Al Thani
- Preceded by: Position established
- Succeeded by: Position abolished

Personal details
- Born: Doha, Qatar
- Party: Independent
- Education: Durham Military College; Beirut Arab University

Abdullah bin Nasser bin Khalifa Al Thani (Arabic: عبد الله بن ناصر بن خليفة آل ثاني) is a Qatari politician, who served as the Prime Minister of Qatar from 26 June 2013 until his resignation on 28 January 2020. A member of the ruling family, he was Minister of State for Internal Affairs from 2005 to 2013.

== Early life and education ==
He is the son of Sheikh Nasser bin Khalifa Al Thani. His mother was Sheikha Mariam bint Abdullah Al Attiyah who died in December 2019.

Sheikh Abdullah graduated from Durham Military College, United Kingdom, in 1984 and received a bachelor's degree in police sciences. In 1995, he graduated from Beirut Arab University, receiving a bachelor's degree in legislation.

== Career ==
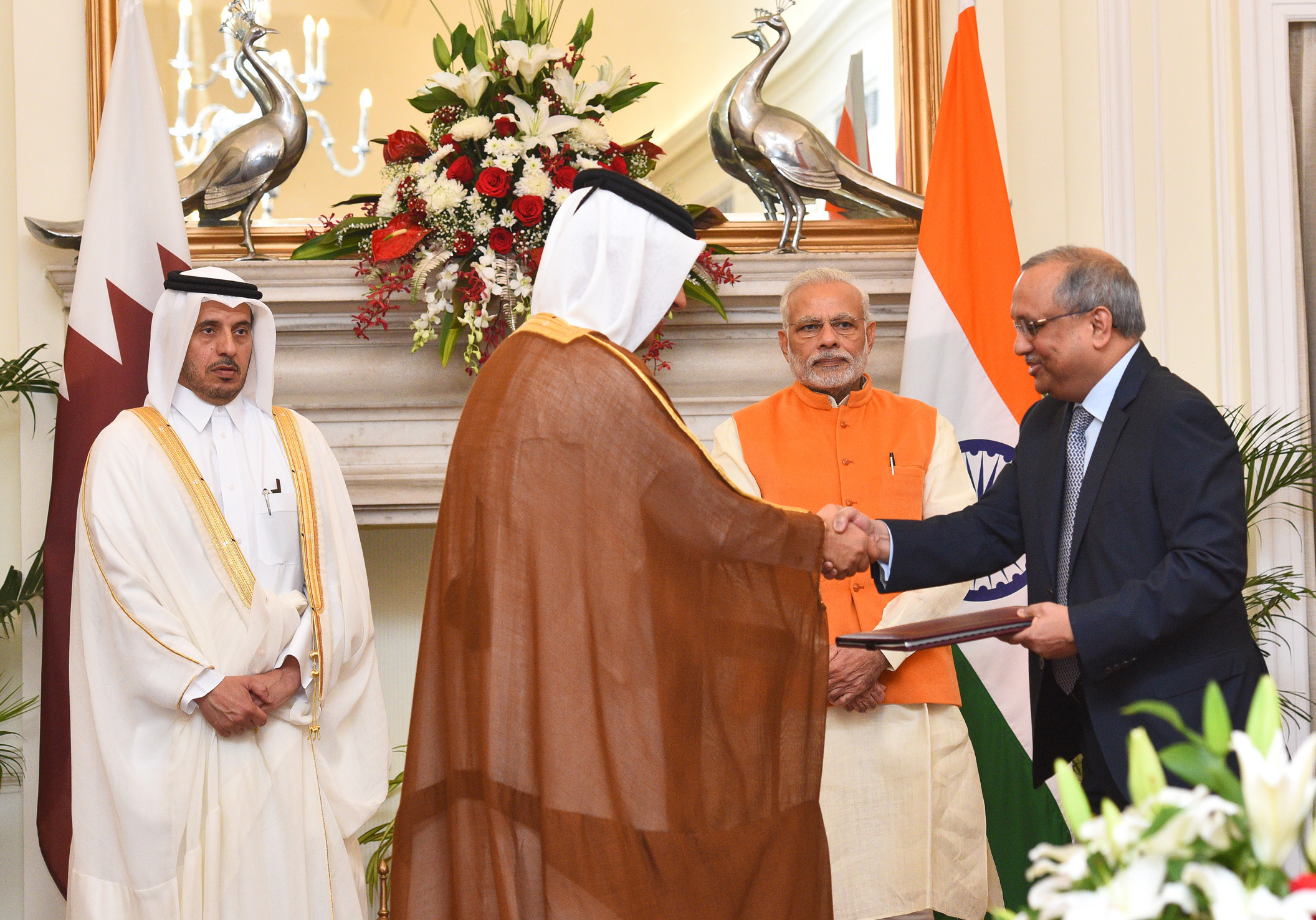
Abdullah bin Nasser bin Khalifa Al Thani with Indian Prime Minister Narendra Modi in New Delhi on 3 December 2016.

Al Thani joined the Qatari military and was appointed as patrol officer at rescue police section in 1985. In 1989, he was appointed as security officer for stadiums at the capital security section. Then he became assistant commander for the support brigade in the emergency police section. He was appointed as commander for special operations brigade in the special security force department and as commander for the special unit of the special security force department. On 28 December 2001, he was named assistant director for the special security force department for operations affairs. In September 2004, he was promoted to the rank of brigadier general.

On 15 February 2005, he was appointed Minister of State for Interior Affairs, after serving in different posts in the government. He was named as prime minister on 26 June 2013 in a cabinet reshuffle, replacing Hamad bin Jassim Al Thani in the post. He was also named as Minister of the Interior in the same cabinet reshuffle, succeeding Abdullah bin Khalid Al Thani as interior minister. His tenure ended on 28 January 2020.

He served as the chairman of the 2022 FIFA World Cup Supreme Committee for Delivery & Legacy. A number of media outlets criticized his meeting with Fathi Hamad, a Hamas political leader, in April 2013, and speculated the risks of terrorist acts occurring at the 2022 World Cup.

== Personal life ==
Al Thani is married and has six children.

== Honours ==
Al Thani was awarded Legion of Honor Award on 19 November 2009.

== Ancestry ==
Ancestors of Abdullah bin Nasser Al Thani (prime minister)

16. Mohammed bin Thani
8. Ahmed bin Muhammed
4. Khalifa bin Ahmed
2. Nasser bin Khalifa
1. Sheikh Abdullah bin Nasser

Political offices
Preceded by Hamad bin Jassim bin Jaber Al Thani	Prime Minister of Qatar; 2013–2020	Succeeded by Khalid bin Khalifa bin Abdul Aziz Al Thani
