= Amiri Diwan of Qatar =

Ruler's Court of the State of Qatar

Coordinates: 25.2912°N 51.5270°E

General information
- Location: Doha, Qatar

Website
- Official Website Instagram Profile Twitter Account

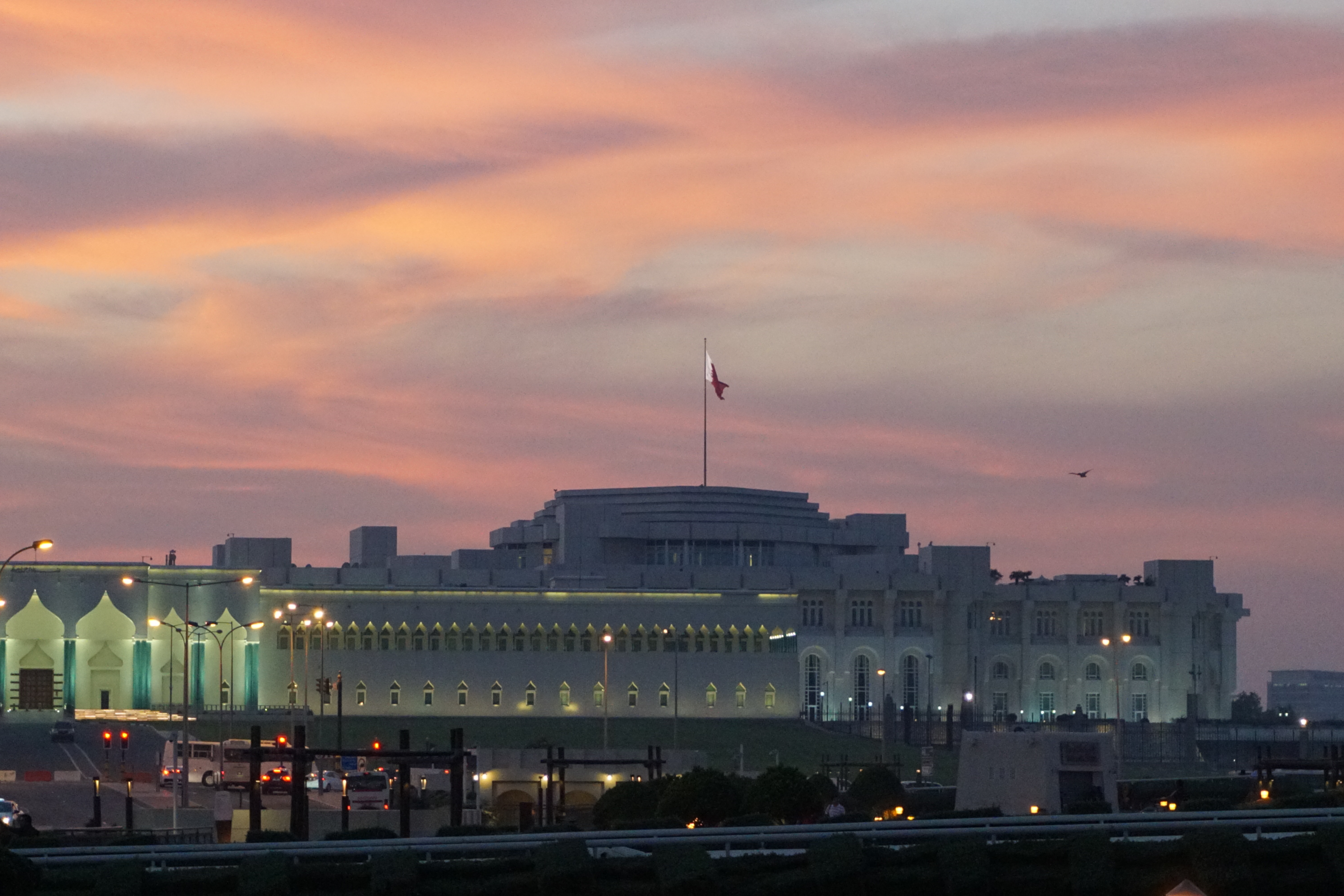
View of Amiri Diwan from the Doha Corniche.

The Amiri Diwan of the State of Qatar (Arabic: الديوان الأميري القطري) is the sovereign body and the administrative office and official workplace of the Emir of the State of Qatar. The Amiri Diwan represents the figurative and bureaucratic center of Qatar. The building also hosts the office of Qatar's Deputy Emir and the Prime Minister.

== History ==
The site that is currently the Amiri Diwan was previously the Al Bidda Fort, built in the 18th century. It was later designated as a military fort called Qal'at Al-Askar during the Ottoman period in Qatar. After the Ottoman withdrawal, the building became the official office of Qatar's rulers, and was renamed Doha Palace, also sometimes called the Qal'at Al-Shouyoukh (Palace of the Sheikhs). The fort was officially renamed to Amiri Diwan in 1971 after Qatar gained its independence from the United Kingdom and the title Emir replaced the title Ruler of the State of Qatar.

== Activities ==
Among the duties of the Amiri Diwan are:

- Updating the Emir of Qatar on the latest international and domestic developments;
- Presenting draft laws to the Emir for approval;
- Relaying instructions from the Emir to other governmental bodies.
- Control the administration in the state

== See also ==
- Old Amiri Palace, Doha
