= Prime Minister of Qatar =

Head of government

Prime Minister of the State of Qatar
- رئیس الوزراء القطري (Arabic)
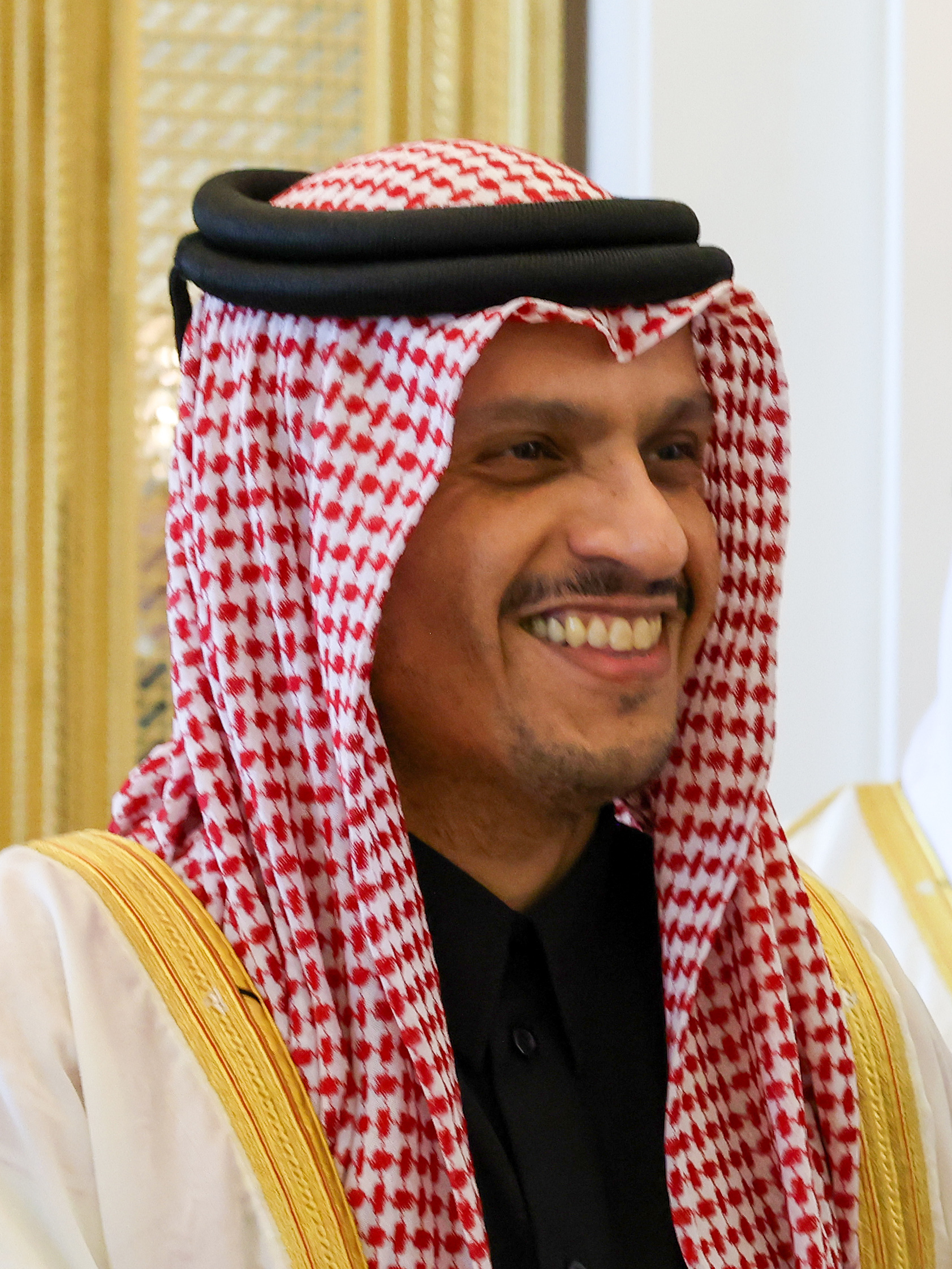
- Incumbent; Mohammed bin Abdulrahman bin Jassim Al Thani since 7 March 2023
- Style: His Excellency
- Type: Head of government
- Residence: Green Palace
- Seat: Amiri Diwan
- Appointer: Emir of Qatar
- Formation: 29 May 1970
- First holder: Khalifa bin Hamad Al Thani
- Deputy: Deputy Prime Minister

The Prime Minister of the State of Qatar (Arabic: رئیس الوزراء القطري) is the head of government of Qatar, and technically the second most powerful official in the country after the Emir, who in practice holds all power and authority.

Khalifa bin Hamad Al Thani, the Emir of Qatar since the coup d'état of 1972, was the first holder of this position from its establishment in 1970. He served as prime minister until the coup of June 1995, when he was deposed by his son Hamad bin Khalifa Al Thani.

In March 2023, emir Tamim bin Hamad Al Thani replaced Khalid bin Khalifa bin Abdul Aziz Al Thani with his minister of foreign affairs, current prime minister Mohammed bin Abdulrahman bin Jassim Al Thani.

== Constitutional role and authority ==
The Prime Minister of Qatar holds the position of head of government, and is technically the second most powerful official in the country after the Emir, in a form of government which is officially a constitutional monarchy, but in practice is more often characterized as an absolute monarchy and autocracy.

The prime minister's authority is entirely derivative of the Emir's power. Analysts consistently note that the Emir holds the power to appoint, dismiss, and accept the resignation of the Prime Minister and all ministers, with the emir maintaining ultimate executive and legislative authority, and the prime minister acting as a supervisor and operational manager implementing the emir's vision.

== List of officeholders (1970–present) ==
No.	Portrait	Name (Birth–Death)	Term of office			Cabinet	Ref.
No.	Portrait	Name (Birth–Death)	Took office	Left office	Time in office	Cabinet	Ref.
1		Khalifa bin Hamad Al Thani خليفة بن حمد آل ثاني (1932–2016)	29 May 1970	27 June 1995 (Deposed in a coup)	25 years, 29 days	1st 2nd 3rd	
2		Hamad bin Khalifa Al Thani حمد بن خليفة آل ثاني (1952–2026)	27 June 1995	29 October 1996	1 year, 124 days	4th	
3		Abdullah bin Khalifa Al Thani عبدالله بن خليفة آل ثاني (born 1958)	29 October 1996	3 April 2007	10 years, 156 days	5th	
4		Hamad bin Jassim bin Jaber Al Thani حمد بن جاسم بن جبر آل ثاني (born 1959)	3 April 2007	26 June 2013	6 years, 84 days	6th 7th	
5		Abdullah bin Nasser bin Khalifa Al Thani عبد الله بن ناصر بن خليفة آل ثاني (born 1960)	26 June 2013	28 January 2020	6 years, 216 days	8th	
6		Khalid bin Khalifa bin Abdul Aziz Al Thani خالد بن خليفة بن عبد العزيز آل ثاني (born 1968)	28 January 2020	7 March 2023	3 years, 38 days	9th	
7		Mohammed bin Abdulrahman bin Jassim Al Thani محمد بن عبدالرحمن بن جاسم آل ثاني (born 1980)	7 March 2023	Incumbent	3 years, 184 days	10th	

== See also ==
- Politics of Qatar
- Emir of Qatar
- Deputy Prime Minister of Qatar
