= Qatari literature =

Qatari literature traces its origins back to the 19th century. Originally, written poetry was the most common form of expression, but poetry later fell out of favor after Qatar began reaping the profits from oil exports in the mid-20th century and many Qataris abandoned their Bedouin traditions in favor of more urban lifestyles.

Due to the increasing number of Qataris who began receiving formal education during the 1950s and other significant societal changes, the following years saw the introduction of short stories, and later, novels. Poetry, particularly the predominant nabati form, retained some importance but would soon be overshadowed by other literary types. Unlike most other forms of art in Qatari society, females have been involved in the modern literature movement on a similar magnitude to males.

== Early Qatari literature ==
Literature in Qatar is typically divided into two periods: 1800–1950 and 1950–present. This divide is due to the vast societal changes in the mid-1900s resulting from the income generated by Qatar's oil exports. Oil revenues transformed the economy from ailing to prosperous, and the subsequent rural flight caused a decline in the popularity of many Bedouin traditions.

=== Poetry ===
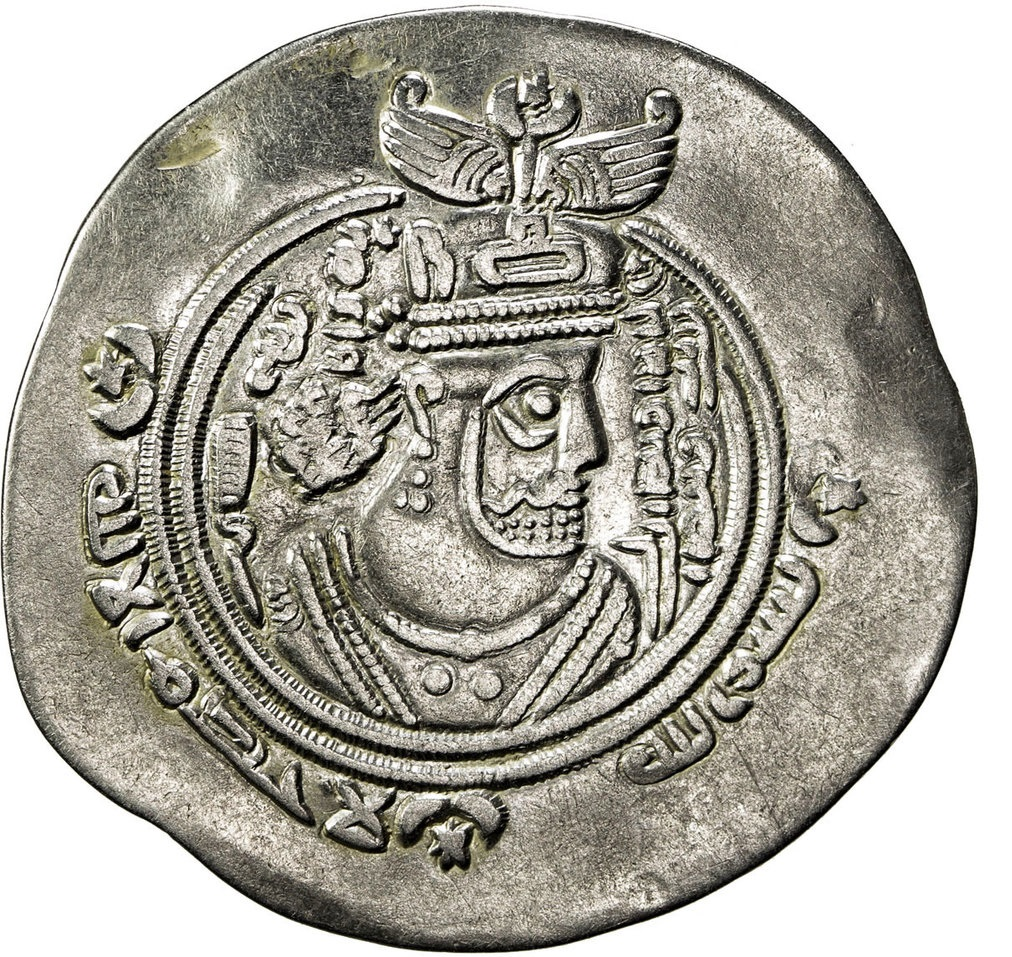
Coin minted in the name of war poet Qatari ibn al-Fuja'a with slogan of Kharijite. His poems were predominantly related to war and martyrdom.

Poems were the first literary form to be mass-produced by Qatari writers. Qatari ibn al-Fuja'a, a folk hero dating to the seventh century, was renowned for writing poetry. He led the Kharjite sect of Islam for a short period; his poems often glorified martyrdom. However, as a result of wide-spread illiteracy that historically prevailed in the Arabian Peninsula, poetry was more often spoken than written. It was seen as a verbal art that fulfilled essential social functions. Having a renowned poet among its ranks was a source of pride for tribes; it is the primary way age-old traditions are passed down through generations. Most often, poems were composed in the nabati form (also known as Bedouin poetry). Poems composed by females primarily focused on the theme of ritha, to lament. This type of poetry served as an elegy.

The beginnings of contemporary written poetry in Qatar date back to the early 1800s with Abdul Jalil Al-Tabatabai and Mohammed bin Abdullah bin Uthaymeen. The former poet was born in Basra but migrated to the flourishing coastal town of Zubarah at a young age. In September 1802, after the Sultan of Muscat and Oman Sultan bin Ahmad imposed a sea blockade of Zubarah, Al-Tabatabai wrote the following poem:

For you God will suffice against
the pangs of separation from your dead ones,
Your longing and pining is like a fire burning
in your heart
Your longing is not hidden,
A longing for the southern wind.

Al-Tabatabai later migrated from Qatar to Bahrain in the 1820s, following the lead of many other prominent residents of Zubarah. As for Mohammed bin Abdullah bin Uthaymeen, he was born in the mid-1800s in Saudi Arabia. He would go on to form a close relationship with Jassim bin Mohammed Al Thani, then ruler of Qatar, and even composed eulogies praising him. Nonetheless, according to academic Mohammed Al Qafud, these two poets did not leave a lasting impact on the poetry scene in Qatar, mainly due to the temporary nature of their stays in the country.

One of the first Qatari-born poets to leave an enduring impact on the peninsula's literary culture was Majid bin Saleh Al-Khulaifi, born in 1873. He expressed an interest in poetry from a young age, and his poems ranged in theme from war to his wife's death. Like most other poems produced in the Arabian Peninsula, his poems followed the nabati structure. Al-Khulaifi's poems were preserved and printed in a 1969 book entitled From Qatari Poetry alongside fellow poets Mohammed Al Fayhani and Ahmed Al Kuwari.

During Sheikh Jassim Al Thani's reign (1878–1913), he funded the printing of many Islamic texts. For instance, in 1892, he provided financing to print 100 copies of Mahmud al-Alusi's book Fathul Mannan: Completion of Laying the Foundation and Response to Brothers Reconciliation and then donated those copies to Muslim academics and students. The following year, in 1893, he gifted al-Alusi 100 copies of the book.

In the early and mid-1900s, two notable poets were Ahmad bin Yousef Al Jaber and Abdulrahman bin Qassim Al Maawda. Al-Jaber wrote many poems with religious as well as political themes, including a eulogy for Gamal Abdel Nasser, the recently deceased President of the United Arab Republic. The latter poet, Al Maawda, spent his life in Qatar and Bahrain. Similar to Al-Jaber, he wrote poems with a political slant, often about pan-Arabism.

=== Reference works ===
The first almanac produced in Qatar and one of the earliest preserved local literary works is the Zubarah Almanac, authored in 1790 by the Maliki Sunni scholar ‘Abd al Rahman al-Zawāwī. This calendar outlined the months and days of the year, specified prayer times, and included observations on agriculture and seasonal variations.

== Modern literature movement (1950–present) ==
The emergence of contemporary literature in the 1950s coincides with the beginnings of the modern art movement. This was mainly because the increased prosperity from oil extraction activities allowed Qataris to receive formal education, adopt more settled lifestyles, and attend higher education institutes abroad to hone their creative skills. Other factors involved in triggering a literary revolution were the improved social standing of women, the advent of a national identity, and the introduction of literary organizations, journalism, and mass immigration.

Qatar and most other Persian Gulf countries borrowed practices and writing styles from the more developed literary cultures of other Arab countries like Egypt, Syria, and Lebanon.

=== Reference works ===
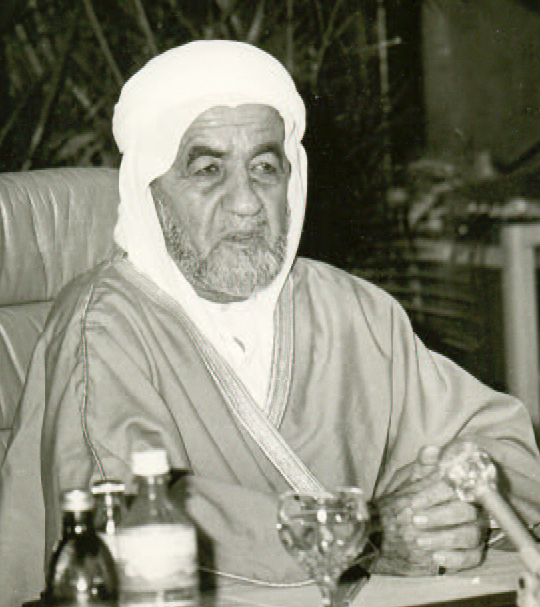
Sheikh Abdullah Ibrahim Al Ansari, author of the Qatari Almanac

The Qatari Almanac (Arabic: التقويم القطري, romanized: al-Taqwīm al-Qaṭari) was an annual almanac authored by religious scholar Sheikh Abdullah Ibrahim Al-Ansari that integrated traditional and astronomical knowledge, offering invaluable insights into prayer timings, seasonal weather patterns, and local celestial navigation across the Persian Gulf region. Following his father's legacy, Al-Ansari published the almanac from 1957–58, incorporating knowledge from ancient Arabic texts and almanacs. In 1966, the almanac was formally declared as the official calendar of Qatar by Emir Ahmad bin Ali Al Thani. According to researcher Daniel Varisco in 1990, "[...] the Qatari Almanac has become a standard source for much of the Gulf. Indeed, it is difficult to find an informant in Qatar who is not familiar with the almanac."

The Qatari Almanac integrated formal astronomical knowledge with local timekeeping systems. It featured charts detailing the zodiacal months, lunar stations, planets, the lunar Hijri and Christian solar calendars, shadow lengths for calculating prayer times, and the navigational system based on Canopus, among other data. It also offered insights into the distances between Doha and other Qatari towns in kilometers and included poetry and sayings reflecting traditional knowledge of environmental shifts with each season.

Al-Ansari’s work not only aligned the Hijri calendar with the zodiac but also preserved a treasure trove of star lore dating back to the pre-Islamic period in the Arabian Peninsula, encapsulated in a genre known as anwa. One of the seminal texts in this tradition was the Kitab al-Anwa' by Ibn Qutayba, who provided extensive descriptions of Arabic star names, traditional meteorological beliefs, and seasonal characteristics.

Additionally, the almanac chronicled the practical use of shadow lengths to determine prayer times before the advent of modern clocks, a method still observable in many older mosques. The almanac also described local seasonal terminologies and the significant navigational and pastoral practices dictated by the stars, such as the rising of Canopus marking the onset of autumn rains and pastoral migrations. Al-Ansari notes six separate seasons, each spanning two months in length: wasmi (corresponding to autumn rains), shita (winter), rabi (winter to spring), sayf (spring), hamim (early summer), and khareef (late summer to early autumn). Al-Ansari's method of classifying the seasons soon became commonplace, appearing in Saudi Arabian and other Arab almanacs. As modern timekeeping methods became more prevalent, the almanac was made redundant.

=== Magazines ===
Qatar's Department of Information published the first weekly magazine 1969, called Doha Magazine. Abdullah Hussein Al Al-Naama produced the first weekly magazine devoted to culture the same year, entitled Al Uruba; this would later be branded as Al Arab. Throughout the 1970s, at least 14 more periodicals appeared, allowing Qatari writers with platforms to showcase their works. This made short stories and traditional poems widely accessible to the masses for the first time.

=== Poetry ===
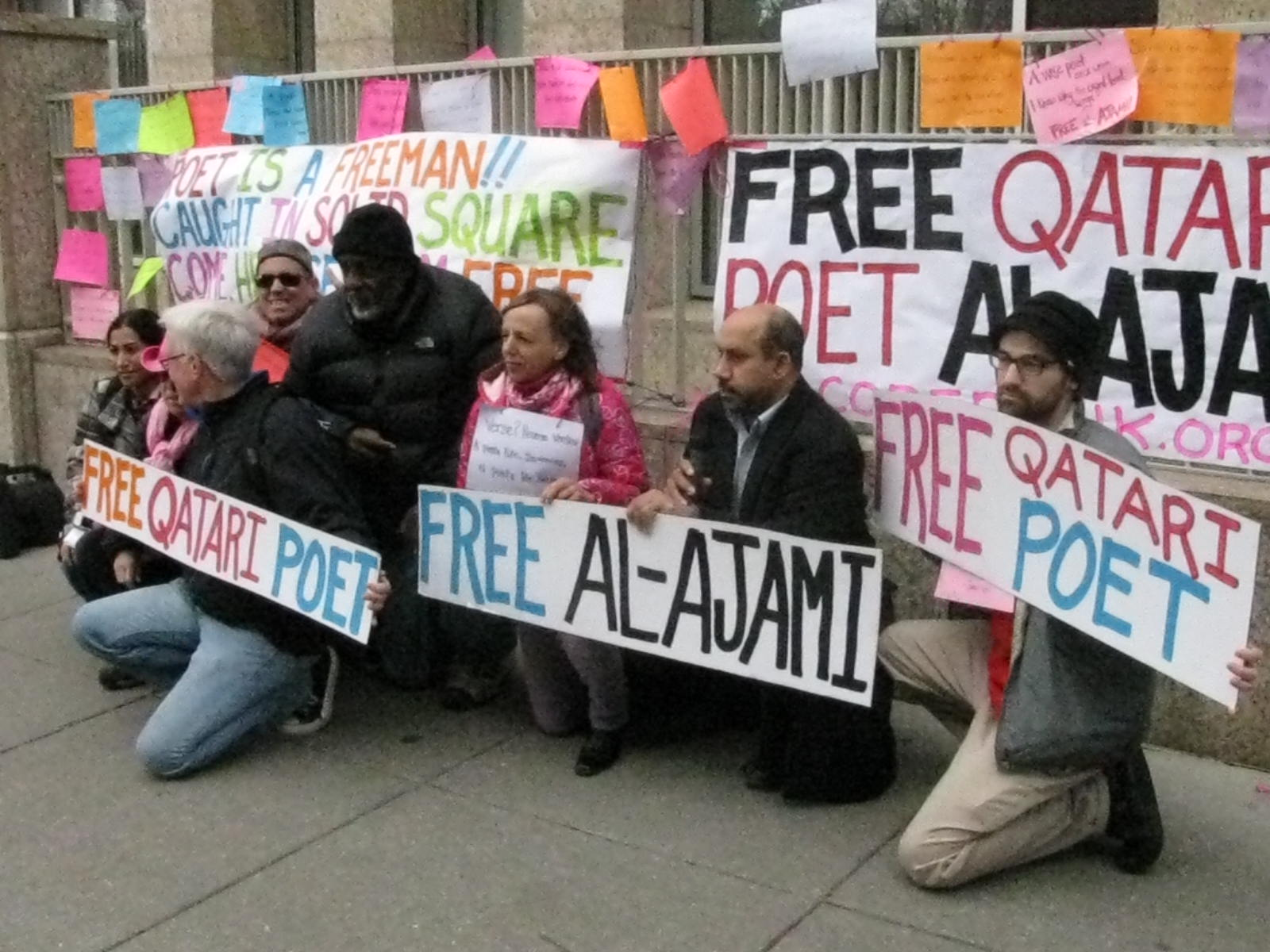
The international response to the imprisonment of poet Mohammed al-Ajami was overwhelming. Pictured here is a demonstration outside the Qatari Embassy in Washington, D.C.

Although poetry no longer dwarfs other literary forms in importance, it is still a long-honored tradition that has attracted new writers in the mid-and late-1900s and even into the 21st century. Poets such as Sheikh Mubarak bin Saif Al Thani, Hassan Al Naama, and Hajar Ahmed Hajar were prominent figures in the late 1900s. Around this time, females such as Kaltham Jaber, Hessa Al Awadhi, and Zakiya Mal Allah also started composing poems. Poems were being published in newspapers, magazines, and books on a large scale for the first time. Mubarak Al Thani even published a poem that would serve as Qatar's national anthem, adopted in 1996.

Mohammed al-Ajami, a 21st-century Qatari poet, was noted for his political poetry that touched on subjects such as the Arab Spring. He was imprisoned in 2012 allegedly for publicly reading a poem in which he criticized Qatar's emir. After several different sentences were handed down, he was finally released in March 2016, after four years of detention.

=== Short stories ===
Short stories first became popular in the 1970s. Yousef Ni'ma introduced the first two collections of short stories in 1970, entitled Bint Al-Khaleej (Daughter of the Gulf) and Liqa fi Beirut (A Meeting in Bayrut). He went on to publish several more short stories throughout the proceeding decades.

Kaltham Jaber was the first Qatari woman to author a collection of short stories, doing so in 1978. The collection was titled Ania wa Ghabat as-Samt wa at-Taraddud, and the main focus of these stories is the desire for Qatari women to have a role in restructuring social norms and cultural conceptions. Other women who later wrote short stories include Mai Salem, Abeer Al Suwaidi, Umm Aktham and Noura Al Saad. Similar to most Qatari women writers of the period, Umm Aktham (the pseudonym of Fatimah Turki) was a vocal proponent of women's rights. She wrote short stories criticizing Qatar's treatment of women but also offered fair criticisms of Western countries so as not to draw the ire of conservatives.

=== Novels ===
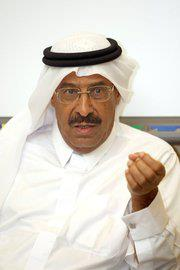
Qatari author Ali Khalifa Al-Kuwari's 2012 book The People Want Reform in Qatar, Too was banned in Qatar because of its critical views towards the emir.

Shu'a' Khalifa and her sister Dalal Khalifa were the first two Qatari novelists to publish their works. They accomplished this feat with the publishing of three separate novels in 1993: al-Ubur ila al-haqiqa (Passage to Truth), written by Shu'a' in 1987, Ahlam al-Bahr al-Qadima (The Old Dreams of the Sea), written by Shu'a' in 1990 and Usturat al-Insan wa-l-buhayra (The Myth of the Man and the Lake), written by Dalal. The sisters would go on to publish four more novels by 2000. Their novels center around social limitations faced by women and scrutinize long-held social values. Another important theme in their novels is the rapid societal transition experienced by Qatar since the discovery of oil.

Since the 2000s, most novels released have explored topics of social change, cultural alienation, and political issues through the perspectives of highly educated youth. These topics are expressed through fictitious autobiographies and personal crises. Some of novels in the 2000s with political motifs were Ahmed Abdul Malik's 2005 novel Ahdan al-manafi (The Embraces of Exile), his 2009 novel Fazi shahid al-islah fi al-Khalij (Fazi', the Martyr of Reform in the Gulf), and Jamal Fayiz's 2013 novel Mud Foam. Certain novels featuring political themes deemed controversial have been banned by Qatar, such as several of Ahmed Abdul Malik's books and Ali Khalifa Al-Kuwari's 2012 book The People Want Reform in Qatar Too.

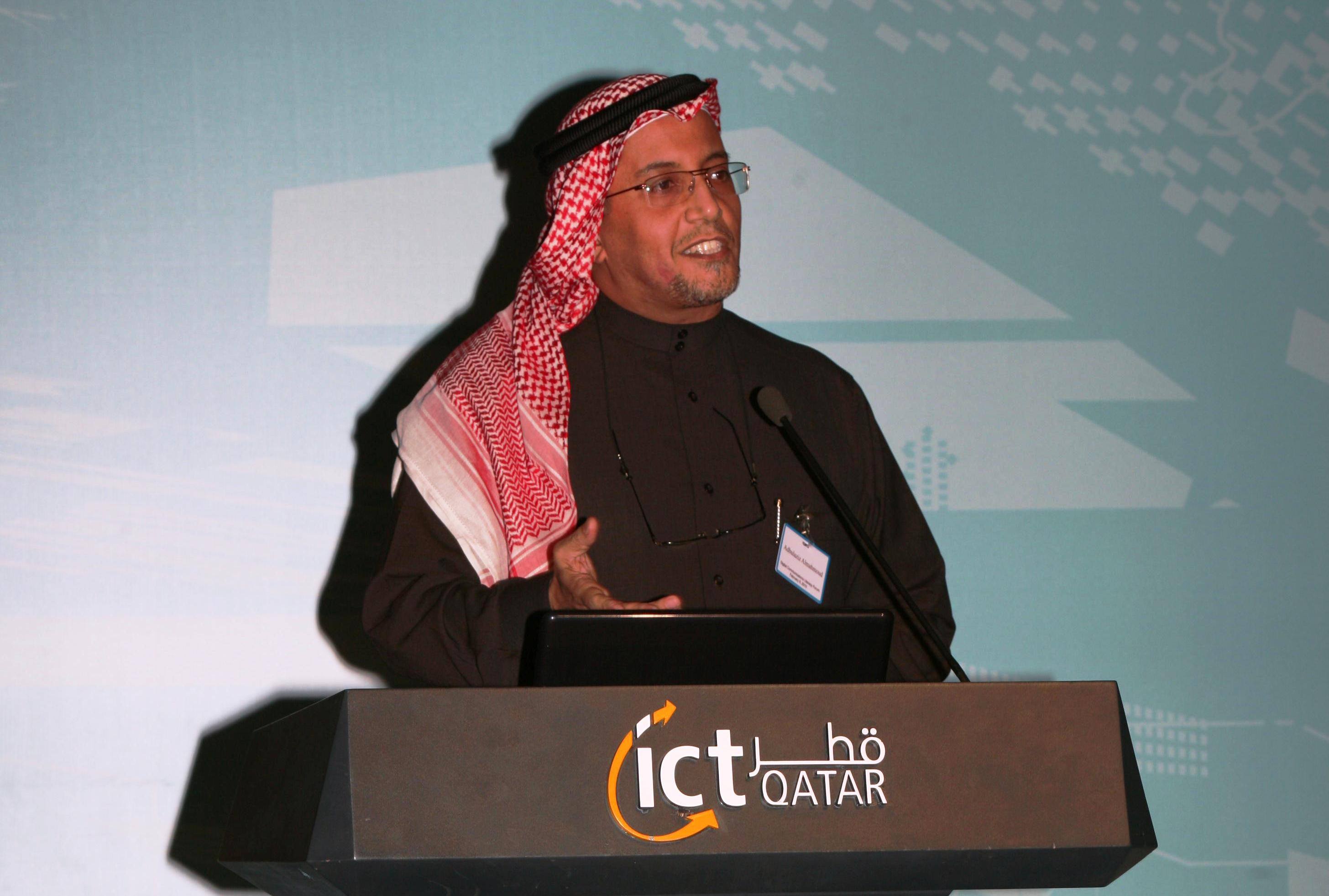
Abdulaziz Al-Mahmoud published his successful novel Al Qursan in 2011.

Abdulaziz Al-Mahmoud and Issa Abdullah were two pioneers of historical novels in Qatar. As a writer, Al Mahmoud's debut novel Al Qursan experienced commercial success after its release in August 2011. The novel was translated into English under the title The Corsair one year later and went on to become one of the best-selling books to be released by a Qatari author. Al Qursan's plot revolves around British politics and piracy in the Persian Gulf region during the 19th century, with the central figure being the Arab pirate Rahmah ibn Jabir al-Jalahimah. Abdullah's first historical novel was released in 2013 as Kanz Sāzīrān (Saziran's Treasure).

Qatar launched the Katara Prize for Arabic Novel in September 2014 with a $200,000 prize for the top fiction book. This competition was later incorporated under the authority of Katara Publishing House, established in 2018.

By June 2015, twelve Qatari women and eight Qatari men had published a collective total of thirty-nine novels. Novels have proven to be one of the fastest-growing categories of literature, with nearly a quarter of all existing Qatari-authored novels being published as recently as 2014. Six new female Qatari writers published novels in 2014: Hanan Al-Fayyad, Sumayya Tisha, Amala Al-Suwaidi, Shamma Al-Kuwari, Muhsina Rashid, and Iman Hamad. Similar to their predecessors, the main themes in their books are women's role in society and the social transition of Qatar.

Ali Al-Naama emerged as a significant voice in Qatari literature with his 2022 fantasy fiction novel "Circus of the Greats," published by Hamad Bin Khalifa University Press. His literary journey bears a meaningful connection to Qatar's media heritage through his grandfather, Abdulla Hussein Al-Naama, who pioneered Qatar's written media and press industry. Growing up under his grandfather's influence, Ali developed a deep appreciation for storytelling that would later shape his writing career. Following the success of his debut novel, Ali released "The Scenarist" in 2025, further establishing his presence in Qatar's contemporary literary scene. His creative momentum continues as he prepares to release the anticipated sequel to "Circus of the Greats" in the coming year, expanding his contribution to Qatari literature.

=== Memoirs ===
Sophia Al-Maria The Girl Who Fell To Earth (2012) is the first English-language memoir to be written by a Qatari author. The Girl Who Fell to Earth chronicles Al-Maria's upbringing between her "redneck family in Washington State" and her Bedouin family in Qatar. The narrative explores themes of conflicting cultures, immigration, and personal growth.

== Qatar in literature ==
An independent and modernized version of Qatar's town of Zubarah is the setting for a large portion of Larry Correia's and Micheal Kupari's military thriller Dead Six.

== Preservation and documentation ==
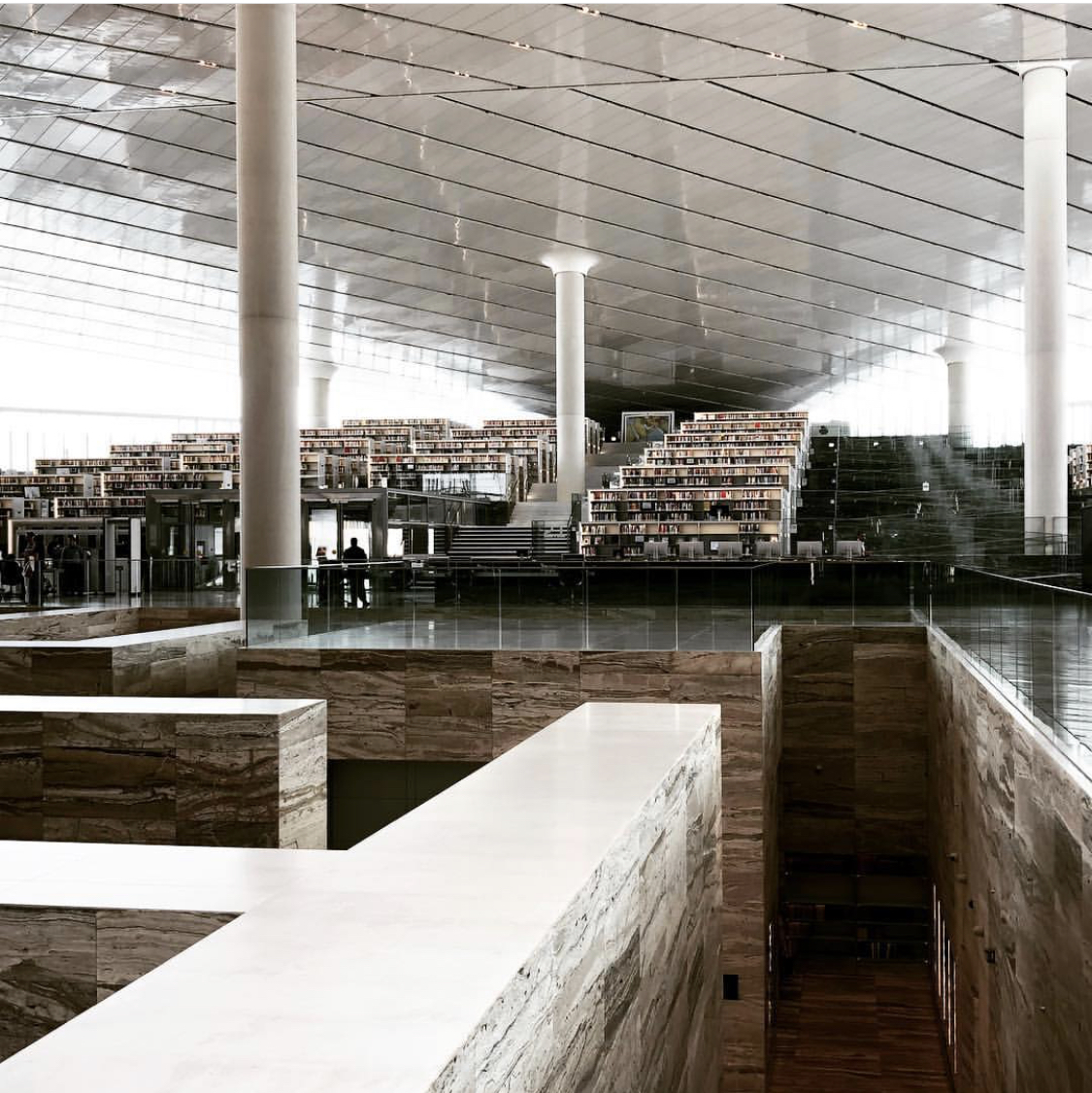
The interior of the Qatar National Library.

In the late 20th century, the works of some of Qatar's most eminent early poets were posthumously documented in diwans by academics and fellow writers. Mohammed Hassan Al-Kuwari, a researcher for Qatar's Ministry of Culture, Arts and Heritage, composed a directory of known Qatari authors in 2012. Called the Dalil Al-Muallifin Al-Qatariyin (Guide to Qatari Writers), the book lists and describes 226 writers.

== Literary organisations ==
In March 2017, the Qatar Poetry Center (QPC) (Diwan Al Arab) was inaugurated by the Ministry of Culture and Sports. According to government officials, the center will host poetry workshops and literary events to promote poetry to the youth and assist current poets. The center was purposefully inaugurated on 21 March 2017, which is World Poetry Day. Furthermore, the center will have a role in collecting and publishing historic Qatari poems in diwans as well as providing analysis for these poems.

Qatar's first publishing house was Bloomsbury Qatar Foundation Publishing (BQFP), founded in 2008 as a joint venture between Qatar Foundation (QF) and Bloomsbury Publishing. Later in December 2015 the publishing house was disbanded with all of BQFP's published works being assimilated by QF's new publishing house, HBKU Press. HBKU Press launched its "Books Made in Qatar" project during the 2017 Qatar–Germany Year of Culture. As part of this project, workshops presented by prominent German authors were offered to Qatari authors free of charge. Katara Publishing House, another Qatar-based publisher, was established in 2018. It assumed responsibility for administering the previously-implemented Katara Prize for Arabic Novel.

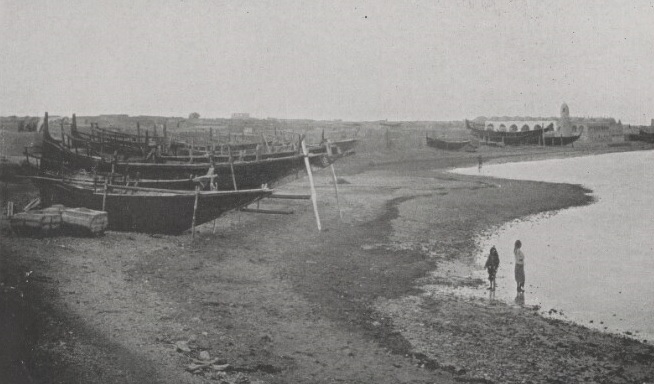
An image of Qatar's capital Doha dating back to 1904 obtained from the Qatar Digital Library archives.

Qatar Digital Library (QDL) was launched in October 2014 as part of a partnership consisting of Qatar Foundation, Qatar National Library and the British Library. QDL comprises one of the largest online collections of historical records on the Persian Gulf countries.

The digital library, with an English and Arabic bilingual interface, encompasses 500,000 pages of items held by the British Library on the history of the Persian Gulf region. Some 475,000 pages, dating from the mid-18th century to 1951, are from the India Office Records and Private Papers, and 25,000 are of medieval Arabic scientific manuscripts. Among the pages are numerous historical photographs, maps, and drawings.

In August 2017, the Qatari Authors' Forum was opened to help integrate new writers into the industry.

== Literary festivals ==
The Doha International Book Fair is by far the largest literary festival held in Qatar. Its first edition took place in 1972, making it the oldest book fair in the country and one of the oldest in the Persian Gulf region. Beginning as a biannual event, it was changed to an annual event in 2002 and runs for 10 days. Starting in 2010, the book fair designates one country as an "honorary guest" for every exhibition held. The 2023 edition witnessed the participation of more than 500 publishing houses from 37 countries.

The Ministry of Culture hosted the first edition of the Ramadan Book Fair in April 2022, which was marked by the participation of 35 international and local publishing houses. The event, held in Souq Waqif, ran for 9 days and emphasized local content.

Under the auspices of the Ministry of Culture, a joint venture between the Qatari Publishers and Distributors Forum and Qatar University Press saw the inaugural edition of the Qatar University Book Fair held in February 2023.

The Katara Arabic Language Festival, an annual event organized by the Katara Cultural Village Foundation since 2016, is part of an initiative launched in 2014 to support the Arabic language in Qatar. The festival features a range of educational and cultural activities, including a monthly illustrated magazine for youth, Arabic language competitions on social media, and Arabic video games. Additional events include puppet theatre, traditional storytelling, children's performances, poetry readings, and secondhand book fairs.

== Literary awards ==
Launched in 2014, Katara Prize for Arabic Novel is an annual award organized by Katara Cultural Village that celebrates distinguished Arab novelists. It has a total prize pool of $650,000 and a main prize of $200,000, making it one of the richest literary prizes in the world. The prize aims to consolidate the presence of distinguished Arab novels on the global stage. The 2020 edition saw the launch of the magazine Sardiyat, the first international peer-reviewed magazine issued by Katara. Additionally, four periodical books specialised in novels were inaugurated in 2020.

A separate prize for Nabati and Classical Arabic poems was established by Katara in 2015, known as Katara Prize for Prophet’s Poet.

== Writers ==
- Abdulaziz Al-Mahmoud, noted for his historical novel Al Qursan
- Ali Khalifa Al-Kuwari, noted for his book The People Want Reform in Qatar, Too
- Dalal Khalifa, jointly published the first Qatari novel in 1993
- Hajar Ahmed Hajar, known for writing poetry and analyzing historic Islamic poetry
- Kaltham Jaber, first Qatari woman to publish a collection of short stories in 1978
- Mohammed al-Ajami, Qatari poet who was imprisoned for insulting the emir through poetry
- Mubarak Al Thani, published a poem that would serve as Qatar's first national anthem
- Mouza Al Malki, non-fiction writer
- Shu'a' Khalifa, jointly published the first Qatari novel in 1993
- Sophia Al-Maria, Qatari-American writer best known for her 2012 memoir The Girl Who Fell to Earth
- Yousef Ni'ma, first Qatari to publish a collection of short stories in 1970
- Zakiya Mal Allah, one of the earliest woman Qatari poets

== See also ==
- Culture of Qatar
- Qatari art
- Theatre of Qatar
