= List of newspapers in Qatar =

Below is a list of newspapers published in Qatar.

- Al Arab – Arabic daily
- Al Raya – Arabic daily
- Al Sharq – Arabic daily
- Al Watan – Arabic daily
- Lusail – Arabic daily
- Gulf Times – English
- The Peninsula – English
- Qatar Chronicle – English
- Qatar Tribune – English
- Vartamanam – Malayalam daily
- Gulf Madhyamam – Malayalam daily
- Middle East Chandrika – Malayalam daily
- Malayala Manorama – Malayalam daily
- Siraj – Malayalam daily
- Mathrubhumi – Malayalam daily
