= Mass media in Qatar =

The mass media in Qatar relays information and data in Qatar by means of television, radio, cinema, newspapers, magazines and the internet. Qatar has established itself as a leading regional figure in mass media over the past decade. Al Jazeera, a global news network which was established in 1996, has become the foundation of the media sector. The country uses media to brand itself and raise its international profile as well as project its soft power.

Despite Al Jazeera being considered to be one of the Middle East's most open media outlets, Qatari authorities enforce stringent restrictions on freedom of local media, including censoring internet services and outlawing criticism of the ruling family. According to Reporters Without Borders, in 2026 journalists continue to face a "draconian system of censorship".

== Print media ==
=== Newspapers ===
There are currently seven newspapers in circulation in Qatar, four published in Arabic and three in English, all of which practice significant self-censorship. Qatar's first weekly newspaper, Gulf News, appeared in 1969. Al Arab was the first post-independence newspaper to appear in Qatar, in 1972. Gulf Times was the first English newspaper in Qatar until the arrival of The Peninsula in 1996.

According to circulation estimates released in 2004, Al Watan was the most widely circulated newspaper in Qatar, with a circulation rate of 18,000. Al Sharq and Gulf Times both came second, with circulation rates of 15,000. A 2008 report asserted that the total circulation rate was approximately 100,000 copies per day, with Al Raya and Gulf Times both having the highest circulation rates at 18,000, and Al Sharq and Al Watan having circulation rates of 15,000.

=== Magazines ===
Firefly Communications and Oryx Communications are two of the most prominent magazine publishing houses in Qatar. There were nine magazines in 2009.

The first weekly magazine, Al-Urooba, was issued in 1970.

English-language magazines in the country include family publication Doha Family Magazine, the first regularly printed parenting publication in Qatar and Society, published by Gulf Times.

Business magazine The Edge, women's fashion magazine GLAM, and Qatar Today. Qatar Al Yom is an Arabic-language business magazine. By 2014, Firefly had added more publications to its brand, including Qatar Construction News, Alef, Volante and Sur La Terre.

=== Publishing ===
Qatar established a foothold in the publications market with the founding of Bloomsbury Qatar Foundation Publishing in 2008. Qatar Foundation ceased its partnership with Bloomsbury Publishing in 2015, and created its own publishing house in its place under the name Hamad Bin Khalifa University Press. Another Qatari book publisher, Katara Publishing House, was established in 2018.

Qatar also holds annual book fairs to celebrate the new publications produced by the local publication companies. In the 30th annual Qatari International Book Fair there was a number of publishing companies that participated. Lusail Publishing House and Roza Publishing House are some of the new additions to the publication companies.

== Radio ==
The evolution of radio broadcasting in Qatar follows the broader trends in media development within the Arab world. Among the notable early Arab radio stations was the Egyptian station Sawt Al Arab, established in 1953, which played a significant role in promoting Arab nationalism and anti-colonial sentiments, albeit experiencing credibility challenges during the Six-Day War. During the 1950s and 1960s, when residents of Qatar first acquired radio technology, most listened to Sawt Al Arab, and to a lesser extent, other Arabic-language radio stations such Radio Bahrain and Kuwait Radio, both of which were established in the 1950s. On a small-scale level, the beginnings of radio broadcasting in Qatar can be traced back to rudimentary devices utilized by Qatar Petroleum and schools in the 1960s for internal communication. Qatar's first major foray into radio broadcasting commenced with the establishment of Qatar Radio on 25 June 1968, representing a collaborative effort between the Qatari government and the British Marconi Company.

Emphasizing locally produced content, Qatar Radio prioritized programs reflecting Qatar's culture. The increasingly diverse demographics of Qatar led to specialized radio services catering to various linguistic demographics, exemplified by the establishment of Holy Quran Radio, English Program, Urdu Program and French Program, among others. The station, initially operating for two hours weekly, garnered a sizable audience before expanding its transmission to four hours. Sawt Al Khaleej Radio was established in 2002 and Sawt Al Rayyan Radio in 2007, both focusing on promoting regional music and folklore. A third radio station, Katara Radio, was inaugurated in 2014 and besides broadcasting programs on cultural practices and folk music of Qatar, it also produces programs on the Arabic language and Islamic history.

Previously, all radio programs in the country were state-owned and are amalgamated as the Qatar Broadcasting Service, but since 2020, the government has granted licenses to private radio stations. In a bid to enhance diversity and accommodate Qatar's multicultural populace, in 2020 the government granted licenses for private radio stations in various languages. These private initiatives, such as "Malayalam," "Snow," "One," and "Olive," catered to specific linguistic communities, such as Malayalam and Hindi. These stations were first announced in 2017.

== Television ==
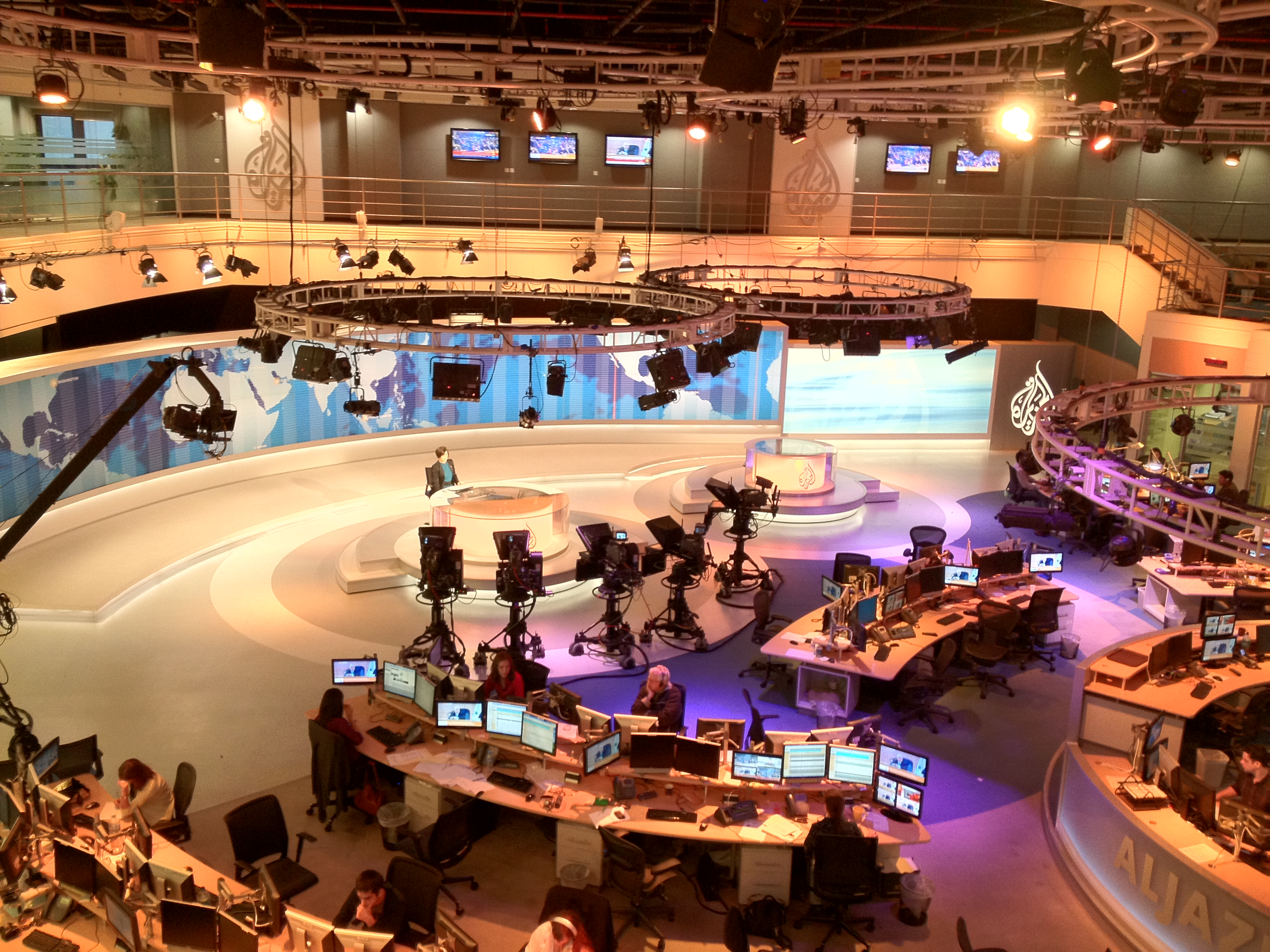
Al Jazeera English newsroom

The first television station in Qatar was Qatar TV. It began producing and transmitting its own programmes in 1970, with color transmission since 1974. It had a monopoly on television audience until 1993, when Qatar Cablevision began broadcasting satellite channels. Despite the broadening of television offerings, Qatar TV remains popular amongst locals. The first news network was the Qatar News Agency, which was launched in 1975. In May 1977, the Qatar General Broadcasting and Television Corporation was founded.

The logo of Bein Sport, which is a global sports network.

Al Jazeera, currently Qatar's largest television network, was founded in 1996. Initially launched as an Arabic news and current affairs satellite TV channel, Al Jazeera has since expanded into a network with several outlets, including the internet and specialty TV channels in multiple languages. It is accessible in several world regions. The network is a Private Foundation for Public Benefit under Qatari law, receiving its funding from the Qatari government but operating independently.

beIN Sports, a global network of sports channels, was launched in 2012. It is an affiliate of Al Jazeera Media Network. It currently operates three channels in France – beIN Sport 1, beIN Sport 2 and beIN Sport MAX – and launched two channels in the United States in August 2012.

During the 2011 AFC Asian Cup, the Al-Kass Sports Channel set a world record when it deployed 51 different cameras in a broadcast of a single match.

== Motion pictures ==
Qatar's modern film industry was conceived in 2009. From then onwards, there have been efforts to develop a sustainable film industry in the country and in the region, such as the organization and hosting of the Doha Tribeca Film Festival from 2009 to 2012, which formed a partnership with the American-based Tribeca Film Festival.

In 2010, Khalifa al-Muraikhi released Qatar's first full-length film, Clockwise. The film is a documentary on 'fijri', a genre of Arabic music performed during pearl trips, and was premiered in Doha during the celebration ceremony for the city's successful nomination for the Arab Capital of Culture.

The Doha Film Institute was launched in 2010 with the aim of developing a film industry with strong links to the international film community. DFI is credited as a production company on several films, including the co-production of Black Gold; The Reluctant Fundamentalist, directed by Mira Nair, which was the opening film in the 69th Venice International Film Festival; and Kanye West's Cruel Summer, a short film shot in Doha which premiered during the 2012 Cannes Film Festival.

Innovations Films have been credited by the DFI as being one of the leading film production companies in the country.

Some observers in the Arab art scene have criticized the Qatari film industry, claiming that they feature more foreign films than regional ones, and view it as more of a platform to put the country's film industry on the map rather than a means to support regional talents.

Through the state-owned beIN Media Group, Qatar owns 51% of American film and television production and distribution company Miramax, which owns the rights for famous American films such as Pulp Fiction and Good Will Hunting.

== Internet ==
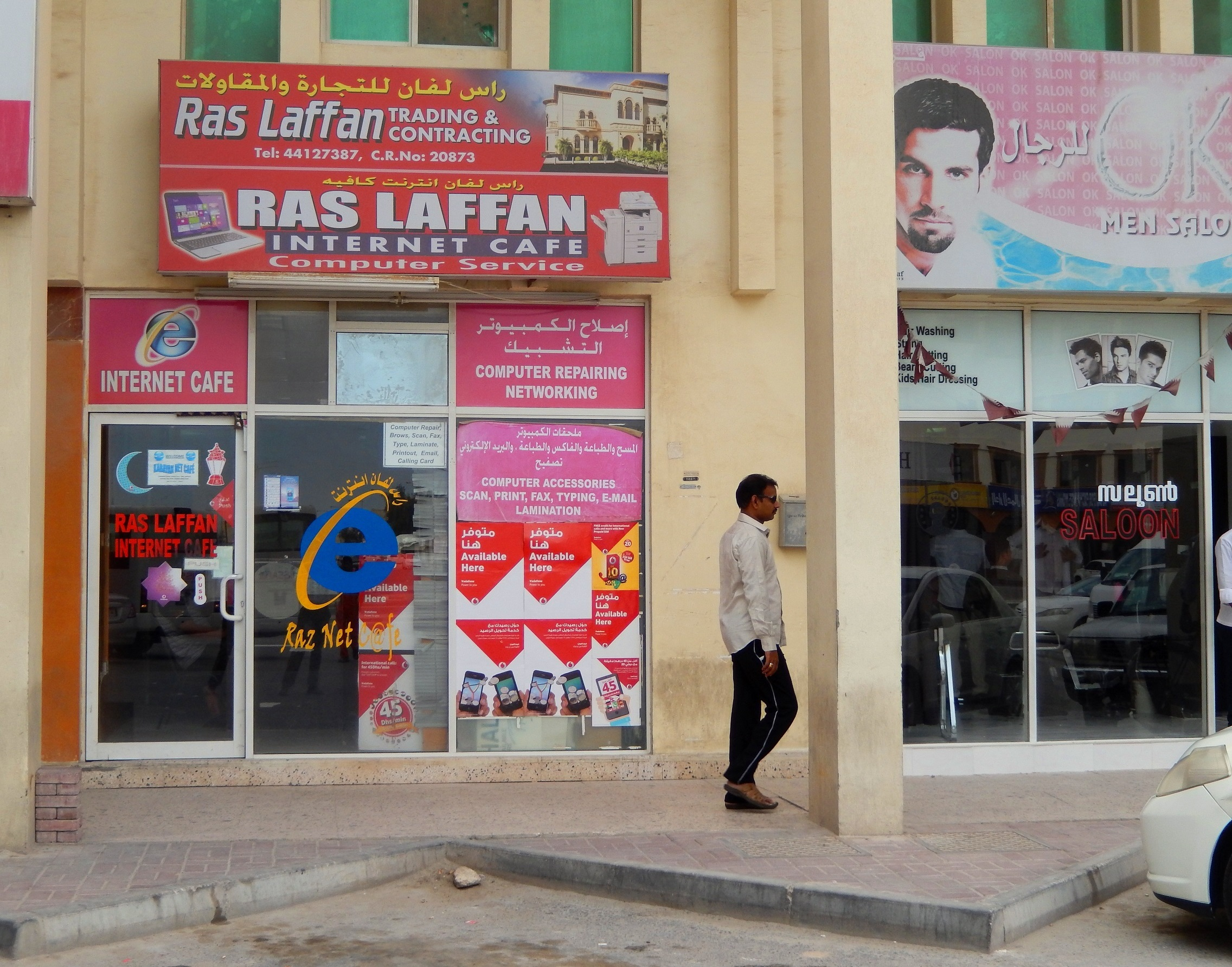
An internet café in Al Khor

Internet services have been available in Qatar since 1997. Statistics released by the International Telecommunication Union reveal that as of 2012, 88% of the population is connected to the internet. Internet usage has drastically increased from 2000, when it was 5%. All of the major newspaper publications have online websites. Al Jazeera's English website was launched in 2003 at the beginning of the Iraq War. It has been the subject of numerous cyber attacks.

In 2007 Qatar was the second most connected country in the Arab region. Qatar's internet penetration rate grew from 6% in 2001 to 37% in 2007 to 86% in 2011. From 2013 until 2016, internet penetration in Qatar grew 12%, leaving it at 93%.

In regards to telecommunication infrastructure, Qatar is the highest ranked Middle Eastern country in the World Economic Forum's Network Readiness Index (NRI), an indicator for determining the development level of a country's information and communication technologies. Qatar ranked number 23 overall in the 2014 NRI ranking, unchanged from 2013.

== Media censorship ==
Although the ministry of information was abolished in 1998, with the press occasionally allowed to criticize the economy or the status of foreign workers, journalists continue to face a "draconian system of censorship". It has been noted in scholarship that the Qatari government "made great play" of the abolition of the Ministry of Information promising greater press freedom, and that in reality the step was a "highly symbolic gesture" intended to signal reform to international partners while attempting to "carefully, selectively, and pre-emptively remain in control of content".

The 1979 Prints and Publications Law, which imposes many restrictions on the freedom of the press, remained in effect despite other reforms made by then-emir, Hamad bin Khalifa Al-Thani. Article 46 of the press law outlaws criticism of the emir. It declares, “The Emir of the state of Qatar shall not be criticized and no statement can be attributed to him unless under a written permission from the manager of his office.” As a result, journalists practice self-censorship, particularly in regards to the ruling family. They are also subject to prosecution for insulting Islam. IREX reports that newspapers and radio programmes possess a wider margin of freedom than the official news media.

Internet service is monitored by the government, which censors pornography and other materials deemed inappropriate. The customs and the censorship office in the Qatar General Broadcasting and Television Corporation monitor imported foreign broadcasting for sensitive content.

In 2014, a Cybercrime Prevention Law was passed, threatening to punish anyone who violates social values by publishing information regarding the private or family life of an individual, even if the information is accurate. If convicted, a perpetrator can face up to a year in prison and a fine of QR 100,000. The law also stipulates that anyone found guilty of publishing false news which could jeopardize the safety of the state could face a maximum 1-year prison sentence and QR 250,000 fine, while anyone who is found guilty of publishing false news with the aim of destabilizing national security may face up to a three-year prison sentence and a fine of QR 500,000. The Gulf Center for Human Rights has stated that the law is a threat to freedom of speech and has called for certain articles of the law to be revoked.

=== Initiatives to alleviate media censorship ===
In 2008, Qatar was the only country which abstained from signing the Arab Satellite Charter, a proposal intended to regulate and control satellite TV stations. AFP reported that Qatar abstained from signing the charter for legal reasons.

The Doha Centre for Media Freedom was established in December 2007 with the aim of promoting media freedom throughout the region. Robert Ménard, a founder of Reporters Without Borders, was appointed as the director-general of the organization in April 2008. He resigned in July 2009 over a dispute with the Qatari authorities, whom he accuses of restricting the centre's freedom of speech.

Censoring of Doha News

In late 2016, Doha News, which had become the most popular local news platform in Qatar and was widely considered to be the only independent and reliable source for news within the country, was locally blocked by Qatari authorities. The official claim was that the reason was lack of proper licensing, but this was widely rejected as an excuse for censorship.

In May 2020 Doha News was allowed to relaunch in Qatar, with a different team and under an unspecified new owner. The Global Investigative Journalism Network noted in 2021 that since 2017 Doha News has "toned down its critical reporting", but added that it does still "provide a welcome relief from the seven newspapers in the country that practice extreme censorship".

== See also ==
- Al Jazeera effect
