= Jaber Al Harmi =

Jaber Al Harmi جابر الحرمي
- Born: Jaber Salem Al Harmi; April 4, 1969; Doha, Qatar
- Education: Qatar University
- Occupations: Journalist; editor
- Spouse: marriage

Jaber Salem Al Harmi (April 4, 1969) is a Qatari writer, editor-in-chief of Al Sharq, Senior Media Personality and deputy CEO of Dar Al-Sharq Media Group. He was born in Doha, Qatar.

== Biography ==
Al Harmi was born on April 4, 1969, in Doha. He began his career in journalism in 1990 with Al Raya newspaper while still a student at Qatar University. He moved to Al-Watan newspaper in 1995 during its founding phase, assuming the position of Head of the Magazines Department. He rose through the ranks to become Managing Editor, becoming the first Qatari to hold this position in the history of Qatari journalism. In 2004, he joined Al Sharq newspaper as deputy Editor-in-Chief, then served as Editor-in-Chief for 10 years (2008-2016). In December 2016, he served as Managing Director and CEO of Dar Al Arab, then became deputy CEO of Dar Al-Sharq Media Group. He was elected as a member of the Executive Office of the International Sports Press Association in 2005, making him the first Qatari and youngest member in the association's history since its founding in 1924. He has conducted numerous interviews and press interviews with heads of state and government, officials, and senior political figures around the world.

== See also ==
- Al Arab
- Al Sharq
- Dar Al-Sharq Media Group
