= L'Orient–Le Jour =

French-language Lebanese daily newspaper

- L'Orient–Le Jour (30 January 2017)
- Type: Daily newspaper
- Format: Broadsheet
- Owners: The late Michel Eddé's family, including his grandchildren (38%): The Choueiri group (22.7%); Former minister Michel Pharaon's family (15.5%)
- Founded: 15 June 1971; 55 years ago
- Political alignment: Liberalism
- Language: French
- Headquarters: Beirut
- Website: www.lorientlejour.com

L'Orient–Le Jour (English: The Orient-The Day) is a French-language daily newspaper in Lebanon. Its English-language edition is L'Orient Today.

== History ==
L'Orient–Le Jour was first published on 15 June 1971, following the merger of two French-language Lebanese dailies, L'Orient (founded in Beirut in 1924 by Gabriel Khabbaz and Georges Naccache) and Le Jour (founded in 1934 by Michel Chiha).

Between 1970 and 1975, one of the contributors was Samir Frangieh. During the Lebanese Civil War, the paper was closed down by the occupying Syrian Army for a brief period in 1976, before publication was resumed. The editor-in-chief of L'Orient–Le Jour, Eduard Saab, was murdered on 16 May 1976.

The paper won the Grand Prix de la Francophonie from the Académie Française in 2021. L'Orient–Le Jour journalist Caroline Hayek was awarded the Albert Londres Prize for her coverage of the 2020 explosion at the Port of Beirut.

The paper covers politics, local and international news, finance and economics, culture, entertainment as well as sports. According to the Arab Press Network, an offshoot of WAN-IFRA, it is the most widely read Francophone daily newspaper in Lebanon and is "partisan to a liberal, Christian leaning line."

== Editorial stance ==
L'Orient–Le Jour takes a fierce line against Hezbollah, and also against elite corruption in Lebanon. It was one of the few Arab news outlets to say that the 2023 Hamas-led attack on Israel was an unjustifiable massacre. Topics that are still taboo in Lebanon, such as homosexuality, domestic violence, suicide and abortion, regularly appear in its columns.

== Ownership ==
In the past, Michel Eddé and his family owned a 38% share of L'Orient-Le Jour, followed by the Choueiri Group with 22.7%, and the Michel Pharaon family with 15.5%. Private investors held the remaining 23.8%. Eddé's family and grandchildren, including board members Michel and Selim Hélou, kept their share after his death in 2019.

== See also ==
- French language in Lebanon
