= Khalid Bin Mubarak Al-Shafi =

Qatari columnist

Dr. Khalid Al-Shafi

Personal details
- Occupation: journalist, professor

Khalid bin Mubarak Al Shafi (Arabic: الدكتور خالد بن مبارك آل شافي) is a Qatari columnist and the editor in chief of The Peninsula, an English daily published from Qatar. He also teaches media and communication at Qatar University in the capacity of an assistant professor.

== Career ==
Al-Shafi obtained Phd in media with honours, and worked from 1991 to 2009 at the Qatar News Agency (QNA) as a reporter, where he was promoted to the post of managing editor. He joined the Ministry of Economy and Commerce as director of Public Relations and Communication and then moved to the Ministry of Foreign Affairs and worked as First Media Expert at the minister's office. He also worked as the deputy of the head of the Qatari diplomatic mission in the Qatari embassy in Thailand.

Al-Shafi writes columns for the Arabic daily Al Sharq.

In September 2015 he moved to his current position as editor in chief of The Peninsula. After he became the editor-in-chief, he brought in several changes to the content and design of the daily. He also initiated an organizational restructure of the organization.

He published a book, A Year of Stability and Victory...Articles and Interviews in the Face of the Siege, in July 2018 which records Qatar's efforts at weathering the Qatar diplomatic crisis. Contained within the book are news items pertaining to the embargo as well as personal interviews with members of the Qatari government. Both an Arabic and English version of the book was published.
