= Abdulaziz Al-Mahmoud =

Qatari engineer, journalist and author

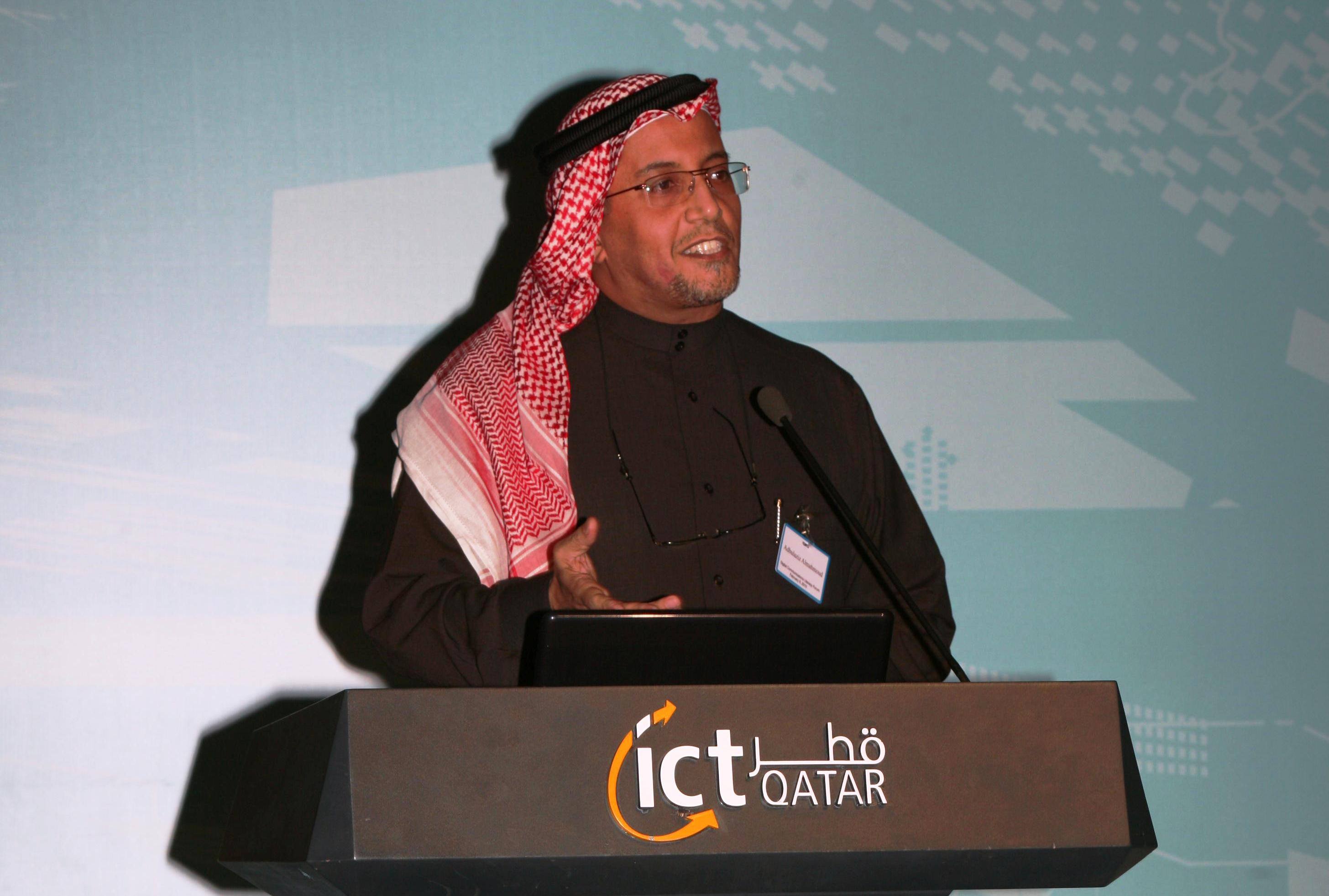
- Born: Qatar
- Occupations: Engineer journalist, author

Abdulaziz Al-Mahmoud is a Qatari engineer, journalist and author. He previously served as editor-in-chief of The Peninsula and its Arabic counterpart, Al Sharq. As a writer, his debut novel Al Qursan experienced commercial success after its release in August 2011. The novel was translated into English under the title The Corsair one year later and went on to become one of the best-selling books to be released by a Qatari author.

== Education ==
Al-Mahmoud graduated from Clarkson University with a BA in engineering and later received a diploma in aviation and engineering from a university in the United Kingdom.

== Career ==
Abdulaziz Al-Mahmoud previously served as an engineer for the Qatar Air Force. He also served as editor-in-chief of English daily The Peninsula. From 1998 to 2001 he was the editor-in-chief of its Arabic counterpart, Al Sharq.

He later worked as editor-in-chief of Al Jazeera's online website for five years. He was also a part of Al Jazeera's board of directors from 2007 to 2009. He helped relaunch the Al Arab newspaper's online website in 2008, and served as its editor-in-chief until November 2009.

=== Career as an author ===
Al-Mahmoud's debut novel was a naval history book entitled Al Qursan, originally released in August 2011. The book's plot revolved around British politics and piracy in the Persian Gulf region during the 19th century, with the central figure being the Arab pirate Rahmah ibn Jabir al-Jalahimah. The book went on to become one of the best-selling books of all time to be authored by a Qatari.

He states that his interest in the Persian Gulf's naval history and the political ramifications of piracy began in 1996 when he discovered a library in Lincolnshire, UK containing old British manuscripts. A nineteenth-century book called Coast of Pirates ultimately prompted him to begin researching the Persian Gulf's history. He claims it took him approximately eleven months to write Al Qursan.

Al-Mahmoud's second work, also a naval history novel, is entitled The Holy Sail. It was published in November 2014. The novel is thematically romantic, and the plot concerns a young woman who falls in love with an Arab tribal leader. Al-Mahmoud places on emphasis on equity and freedom in this novel.

He was one of the two participants in Bloomsbury Qatar Foundation's first 'literary majlis', held in March 2014.
