= Dar Al-Sharq Media Group =

Qatari publishing company

Dar Al-Sharq Media Group مجموعة دار الشرق الإعلامية
- Traded as: Tadawul
- Industry: Media
- Founded: 1986; 40 years ago
- Headquarters: Doha, Qatar
- Key people: Shiekh Khaled Bin Thani Al Thani (founder and chairman), Abdulateef Al Mahmood (chief executive officer), and Jaber Al Harmi (Deputy CEO)
- Products: Newspapers, magazines
- Revenue: Qatari Riyal 13,450 million (2020)
- Owner: Shiekh Khaled Bin Thani Al Thani
- Number of employees: 4000
- Website: www.daralsharq.net

Dar Al-Sharq Media Group (also known as the Dar Al Sharq Group) (Arabic: مجموعة دار الشرق الاعلامية) is a Qatari pro-government media group registered in Doha, Qatar. The group mainly publishes, prints and distributes various publications.

It was founded in 1986 by Sheikh Khaled bin Thani Al Thani, and Abdul Latif Al Mahmoud was recently appointed as CEO of the group. Sheikh Khaled bin Thani Al Thani, a senior member of the Qatari ruling family, also owns and chairs the group.

It publishes several of its own newspapers, and also provides various printing and publishing services, playing a central role in the distribution of various media in Qatar.

== History ==
Dar Al-Sharq Media Group was established in 1986.

In 1987, it launched the eponymous Arabic-language Al Sharq. In 1996, it launched Al Sharq's English-language sister newspaper, The Peninsula. In 2016, it launched Arabic-language business daily Lusail. In 2020, the media group purchased political Arabic-language daily Al Arab.

== Ownership, editorial stance and financing ==
Dar Al-Sharq Media Group is owned and chaired by a senior member of the Qatari ruling family, Sheikh Khalid bin Thani Al Thani, and its publications have a pro-government political stance. Their strategic and editorial decisions are controlled directly by Al Thani, who is very close with Qatar's ruling elite. The publications are widely seen as extensions of the communication strategy of the government.

While its finances are opaque, the media group is known to primarily rely on income from advertising, especially from "state entities and affiliated companies". According to State Media Monitor, it may also receive some direct government support.

== Subsidiaries, associates and joint ventures ==
=== Dar Al Sharq Media Group ===
- Al Arab
- Al Sharq
- The Peninsula
- Lusail Newspaper
- "Qatari Business Group"
- "Haweyah Company for Advertising and Public Relations"

== Partnerships ==
“Dar Al Sharq Group" has several partnerships with Arab and international media organizations, the most important of which are:

- Talal Abu-Ghazaleh Organization
- Saudi Research and Media Group
- Fadaat Media leading in the media field and the owner of the international newspaper "Al-Araby Al-Jadeed", the Arab Television Network, Syria TV, and the English version (The New Arab).
- Diario AS: In partnership with the Qatari Dar Al Sharq Media Group, it launched its website in Arabic

== See also ==
- Al Sharq
- The Peninsula
- Al Arab
