= Pregnancy loss =

Pregnancy loss is the loss of an embryo or fetus. The terms early pregnancy loss and late pregnancy loss are often used but there is no consensus over their definitions.

== Unintentional pregnancy loss ==
- Miscarriage
  - Toxic abortion, caused by pollution or chemical exposures
- Implantation failure
- Molar pregnancy
- Embryo loss
- Fetal resorption
- Blighted ovum
- Vanishing twin
- Stillbirth

== Pregnancy loss through termination ==
- Foeticide
  - Abortion
    - Selective reduction to reduce the number of fetuses in a multiple pregnancy
    - Hysterotomy abortion, a surgical abortion of a non-viable fetus performed similar to a cesarean section
    - Late-term abortion
    - Self-induced abortion
    - Sex-selective abortion
    - Forced abortion
  - Child destruction

== See also ==
- Pregnancy with abortive outcome
- Perinatal mortality
- Murder of pregnant women
- Death of a child
