= Zakiya Mal Allah =

Zakiya Ali Mal Allah 'Abd al-'Aziz (born 1959) is a Qatari poet. Her poetry has been translated into Spanish, Urdu and Turkish.

Zakiya Mal Allah is a graduate of Cairo University, has a doctorate in pharmacy, and has been head of the Quality Control Department in the Department of Pharmacy and Drug Control laboratory of Qatar's Supreme Council of Health. She has published nine books of poetry, and her poetry has been included in English-language anthologies. She has also written for Qatari newspapers, including Al-Watan and Al Sharq.

She received the Qatar Club Prize in Poetry in 1983.

== Bibliography ==
- Fi ma‘bad al-ashwaq ("In the Temple of Desires"). Beirut and Cairo: Dar al-Shuruq, 1985.
- Alwan min al-hubb ("Colors of Love"). Doha: Dawha Press, 1987.
- Min ajlik ughanni ("For You I Sing"). Cairo: al-Shuruq Press, 1989.
- Fi ‘aynayk yuwarriq al-banafsaj ("In Your Eyes the Violet Blossoms"). Cairo: n.p., 1990.
- Min asfar al-dhat ("From Books of the Self"). Qatar: n.p., 1991.
- ‘Ala shafa hufra min al-bawh ("On the Edge of a Hole of Confession"). Damascus: Dar Hassan ‘Atwan, 1993.
- Hiwariyat al-hul wa-l-iqtiham ("The Dialogue of Terror and Intrusion"). N.p.: n.p., 1993.
- Najmat al-dhakira ("Star of Memory"). Doha: Dar al-Thaqafa, 1996.
