= FM 107 Urdu Radio =

Radio station in Doha, Qatar

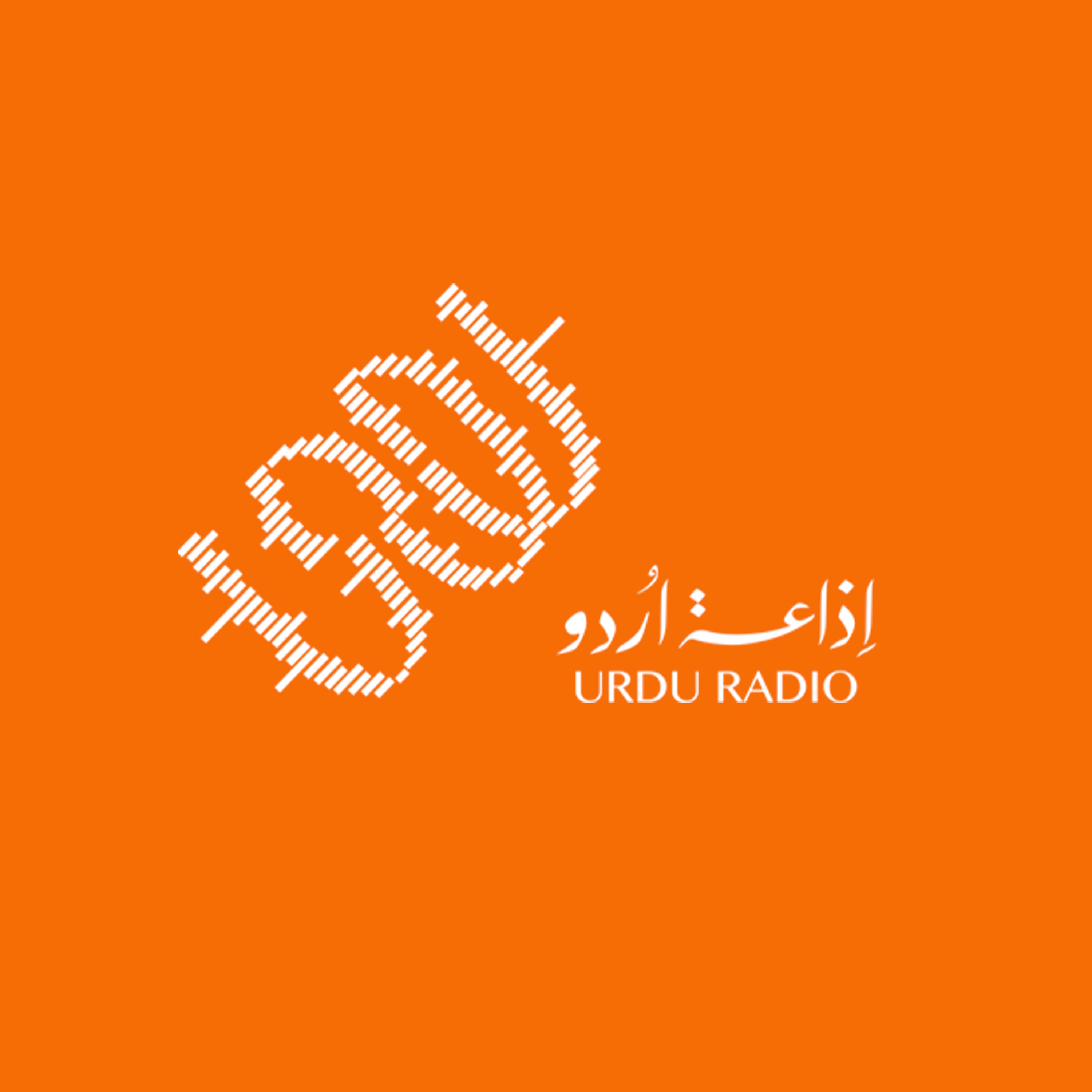

Doha; Qatar
- Frequency: 107 FM

Programming
- Languages: Hindi, Urdu
- Format: Entertainment

Ownership
- Owner: Qatar Media Corporation

History
- Founded: January 1, 1980
- First air date: 2011

Links
- Website: urduradio.qa

FM 107 Urdu Radio is an Urdu-language radio station in Qatar. It is part of the state-owned Qatar Media Corporation and broadcasts content in Urdu and Hindi for the expatriate audience from the Indian subcontinent residing in Qatar.

An Urdu-language service from Qatar Radio began as an hour-long program, airing at 4 p.m. and moving later to 7 p.m., on the 1062 kHz frequency. The Urdu service slowly grew to broadcast for seven hours a day before becoming a separate station in 2011.
