= Health in Lebanon =

Lebanon is a small middle-income country on the Eastern Mediterranean shore with a population of around 4 million Lebanese citizens, 1.2 million Syrian refugees, and half a million Palestinian refugees. It is at the third stage of its demographic transition characterized by a decline in both fertility and mortality rates. Moreover, Lebanon, like many countries in the Middle East is experiencing an epidemiological transition with an increasingly ageing population suffering from chronic and non-communicable diseases. Mortality related to non-communicable diseases is 404.4 deaths per 100,000 individuals, with an estimate of 45% due to cardiovascular diseases, making them the leading cause of death in Lebanon. Lebanon has health indices that are close to those of more developed countries, with a reported life expectancy at birth of 80.1 years (81.4 years for women and 78.8 years for men) and an under-five mortality rate of 9.5 per 1,000 live births in 2016. Since the end of the 15-year Lebanese Civil War in 1990, Lebanon's health indicators have significantly improved.

The Human Rights Measurement Initiative finds that Lebanon is fulfilling 85.1% of what it should be fulfilling for the right to health based on its level of income. When looking at the right to health with respect to children, Lebanon achieves 99.1% of what is expected based on its current income. In regards to the right to health amongst the adult population, the country achieves 98.9% of what is expected based on the nation's level of income. Overall, Lebanon falls between the "bad" and "fair" categories for the right to health because when evaluating the right to reproductive health, the nation is fulfilling only 57.2% of what the nation is expected to achieve based on the resources (income) it has available.

== History ==
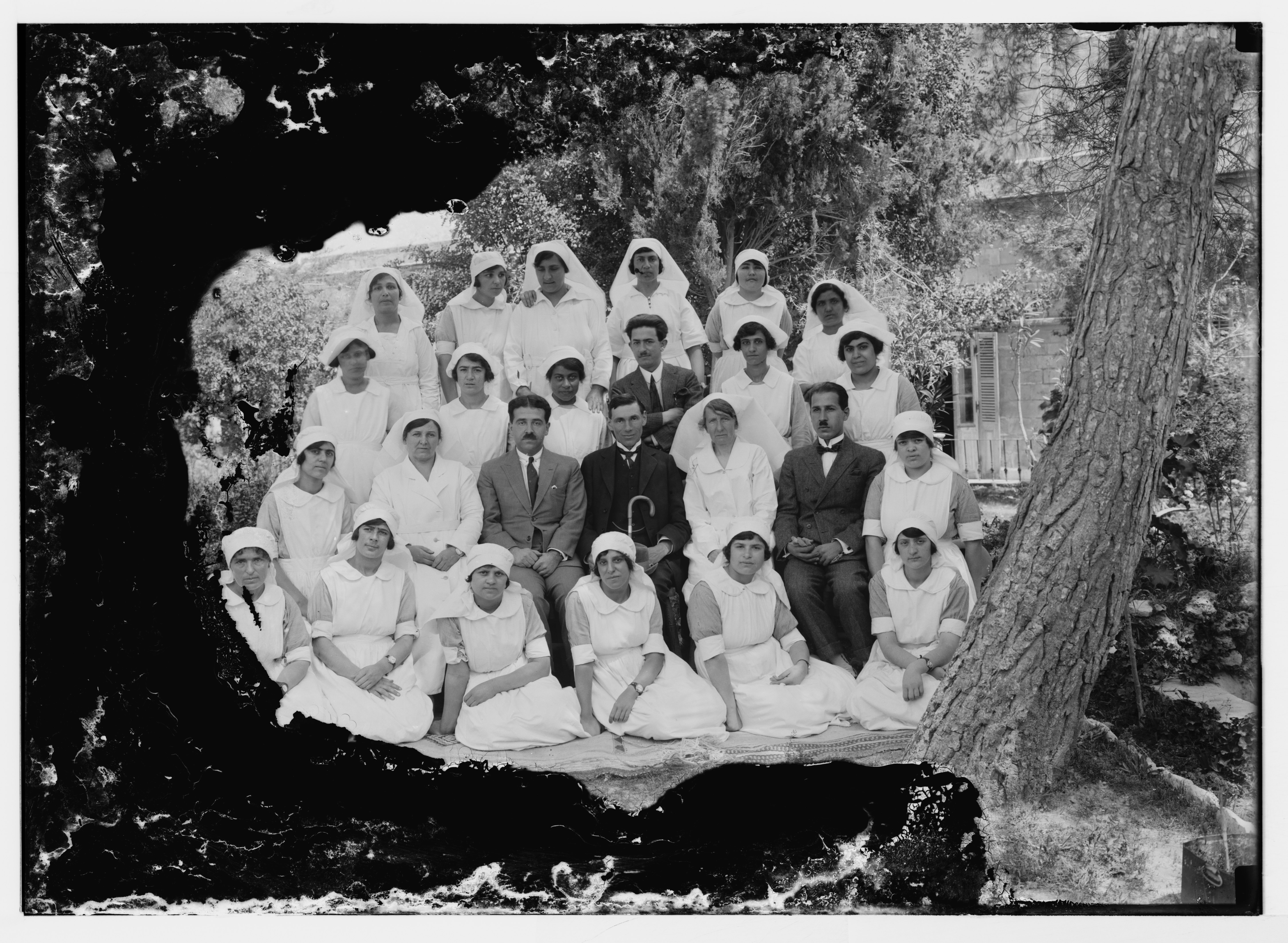
Beirut Hospital staff 1898

Before independence in 1943, health care in Lebanon was given by charitable organisations, religious organizations, and private hospitals. The state played a limited role, and access was uneven across regions and social groups. After independence, the state started and expanded public health functions. It also began building the early public health insurance system, but private care stayed dominant. This dual structure, though fragmented and heavily reliant on out of pocked expenses, became a lasting feature of the system.

The civil war from 1975 to 1990 severely weakened the health sector. Many public facilities were damaged, medical personnel transport became dangerous, and the Ministry of Public Health lost most of its budget. The people of Lebanon increasingly relied on private hospitals and nongovernmental groups to keep services running. The Asfouriyeh Hospital, founded in 1896 in Lebanon, is considered the first modern mental health hospital in the Middle East, the impact of the Lebanese Civil War led to the hospital's closure in 1982.

Change in Lebanon's Health Indicators between 1974 and 2016:
| Indicator | Value in 1974 (before the Lebanese civil war) | Value in 1976 (during the Lebanese civil war) | Value in 2016 |
|---|---|---|---|
| Life expectancy at birth (years) | 67.9 | 34.9 | 80.1 |
| Under-five mortality rate (by 1,000 live births) | 58.9 | 56.8 | 9.5 |
| Fertility rate | 4.53 | 4.36 | 1.71 |
| Maternal mortality ratio (by 100,000 live births) | No data | 104 (1984 value) | 16 (2013 value) |
| Income (gross domestic product per capita) | 15,000 | 4,370 | 13,000 |

Reform efforts in the 1990s and 2000s reduced some out-of-pocket costs, but care stayed highly privatized and unequal. Since 2019, Lebanon’s economic collapse, and the COVID-19 shock during shortages of medicines and staff, have weakened access to care. The 2020 Beirut explosion put more pressure on hospitals and public services. The result of all these factors has been a weaker health system where access to care depends on financial status and place of residence.

== Health care system ==
Lebanon’s health care system lacks a coherent framework and is largely reliant on private providers. The World Bank Group describe Lebanon’s health financing as fragmented with weak insurance regulation. Funding comes from different sources, such as public expenditure, social and private insurance, donors, and a significant amount of out of pocket payments. The Ministry of Public Health supports Lebanon's primary health care network, much of which is operated by or supported by NGOs. The overall health system continues to face major challenges related to access and affordability, where public institutions play a limited role.

Government health expenditure, 2000 - 2023, Lebanon

=== Public health care ===
Publicly funded health care is central to more than half of the population living without other medical insurance coverage in Lebanon. The Ministry of Public Health (MoPH) runs the public sector hospitals and supports a national network of primary health care centers. Public primary care is delivered through a nationwide network of centers, many of them run by NGOs or municipalities under MoPH contracts.

Universal health coverage index, 2000 to 2021, Lebanon

==== Financing ====
MoPH subsidizes hospital care in both public and private facilities, with patient co-payments that vary by hospital type and entitlement status. Recent reviews describe the public health sector's finances as resilient but under severe strain. They show uncoordinated financing of the public health care system that's dependant on private sector delivery, and rising out of pocket costs, which causes limited access to care for vulnerable groups.

==== Refugees ====
In 2015, there were 452,669 registered Palestinian refugees in the country; more than half live in 12 Palestinian refugee camps. They are ineligible for state social services, including health care. Further adding to the issue is the amount of Syrian refugees, totalling almost one for every four Lebanese. These people are often forced to live in squalid conditions due to a lack of government resources. More often than not, these people are also subject to discrimination in certain aspects of life. This includes medical treatment, to which they have no legal right to according to Lebanese law.

Private health expenditure per person, 2000 to 2023, Lebanon

=== Private health care ===
Lebanon’s private health care sector is the main provider of medical care in the country. The Ministry of Public Health regulates the sector through licensing and accreditation, while professional oversight is also handled by syndicates and other non governmental organisations. WHO has described Lebanon’s private hospital network as large and highly concentrated geographically, with most beds located in Beirut and Mount Lebanon, containing the great majority of inpatient care capacity. WHO also puts the private hospital total at 133 facilities and about 12,000 beds, or roughly 83% of national capacity.

For state subsidized hospitalization, patients usually face a co payment, while the ministry covers most of the charge under its reimbursement rules. Access is uneven because treatment often depends on the patient’s ability to pay.

== Health status ==
Effective fertility rate, children per woman who are expected to survive until childbearing age, 1950 to 2023, Lebanon

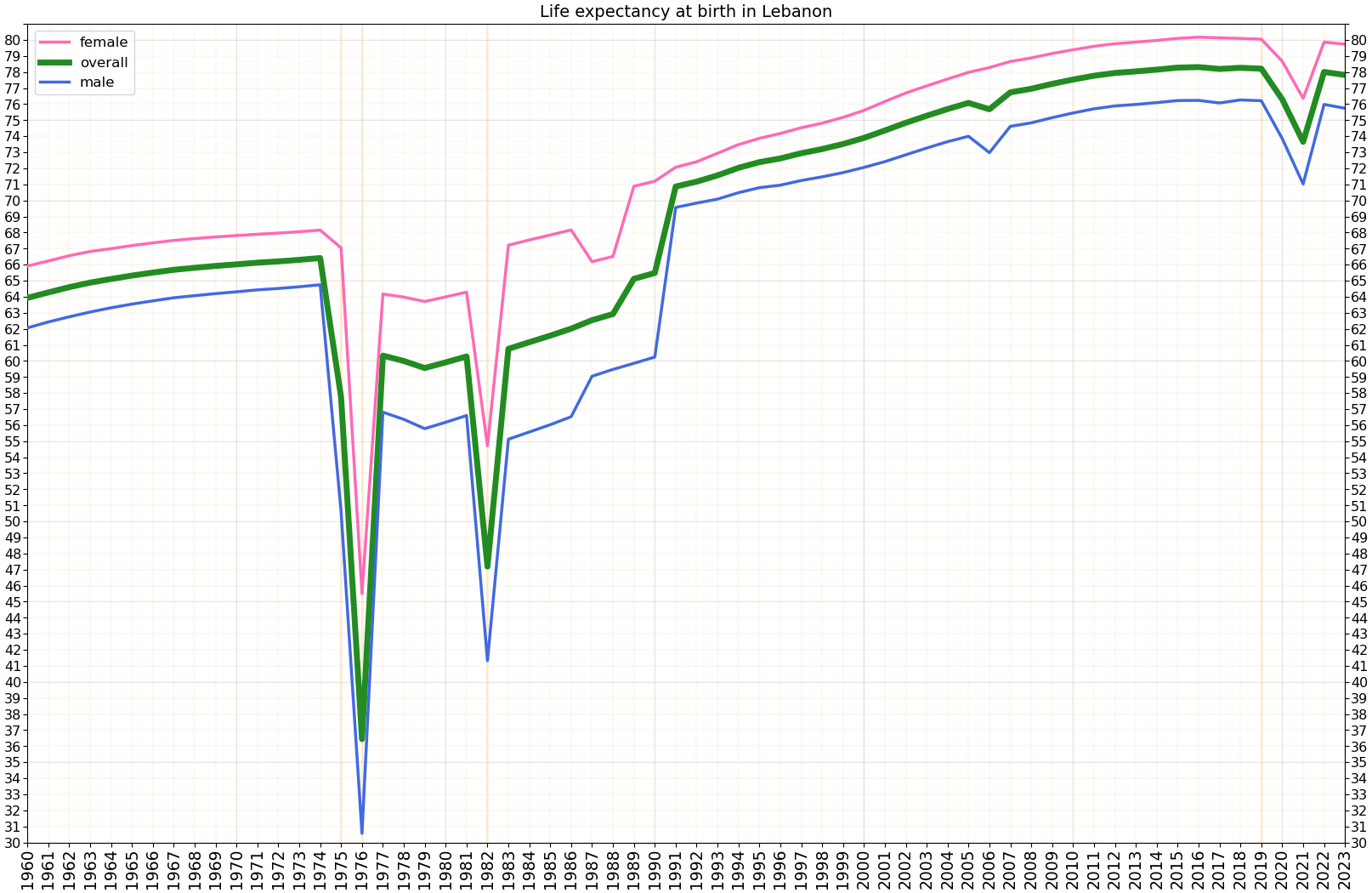
Life expectancy in Lebanon. 1960 - 2023

=== Fertility rate ===
The World Bank Group estimated Lebanon’s total fertility rate in 2024 to be 2.2 children per woman. In the same year, the Ministry of Public Health recorded 91,150 live births. UN and WBG datasets show Lebanon moving from well above five births per woman in the 1960s to near replacement level today. Peer reviewed research has linked lower fertility to socioeconomic change, especially women’s higher education, financial hardships, and increased use of contraception. The decline is part of a demographic transition.

The Ministry of Public Health says its sexual and reproductive health programme, run with UNFPA through primary health care, provides family planning, prenatal care, and birth control to improve health during pregnancies and to support the prevention of unintended pregnancies.

=== Life expectancy ===
Lebanon’s life expectancy at birth has improved over time, but WHO and WBG data show a decline during the COVID-19 period. The same sources estimated life expectancy at around 76 years in 2020, 73 in 2021, 78 in 2022, and 77 in 2023. However, it is also note that life expectancy numbers for Lebanon are modelled because complete and reliable data on deaths in the country are limited, especially for adults and seniors.

Maternal mortality, 1751 to 2020, Lebanon

=== Maternal mortality rate ===
Since the early 1990s, Lebanon has brought its maternal mortality ratio down from more than 70 deaths per 100,000 live births to roughly 15–26 in the early 2000s, a drop of over three quarters. This shift placed the country among those that ultimately met global targets for reducing maternal deaths. From 2004 statistics became based on national hospital data, the Ministry of Public Health began to include sexual and reproductive health in primary care, and in 2011 it set up notification system where public and private hospitals report births, and maternal and neonatal deaths, every month through an online system.

Analyses of maternal deaths consistently identify postpartum bleeding as the leading direct causes, followed by hypertensive disorders of pregnancy, eclampsia, infections and embolism, reflecting the global pattern of preventable obstetric labor complications. The data show that women die because they do not receive timely, good‑quality obstetric treatment, especially in poorer areas and among those who cannot easily afford care or lack proper legal status.

== Health conditions and risk factors ==
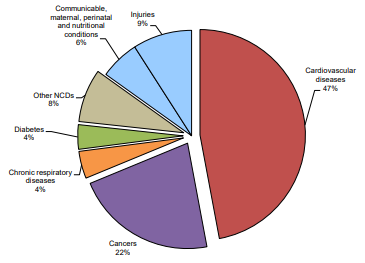
Lebanon's major causes of death in 2014

Lebanon’s health profile has shifted over the past decades, 2021 WHO reported 53% of deaths result from noncommunicable disease. Cardiovascular disease is the leading NCD group, and WHO and related Lebanese sources place it at the top of the mortality profile. Cancer is a major contributor and more people die from cancer every year. Kidney disease, diabetes, and dementia also contribute meaningfully to mortality, although they are smaller components than cardiovascular disease and cancer. This pattern is closely linked to major risk factors, including tobacco use, raised blood pressure, obesity, and physical inactivity. Limited access to medical care has also made chronic disease control more difficult, especially as Lebanon’s health system has faced economic and structural strain.

=== Women's health conditions and risk factors ===
Women have adequate access to gynecological and other female health facilities in Lebanon, excluding contraceptives. Abortion is illegal except in cases where the woman's life is at risk, under Lebanon's Penal Code of 1943.

Abortion in Lebanon is criminalised in all cases except for when the mother's life is at risk according to Lebanon's Penal Code, which was established in 1943. A woman who has an abortion may be imprisoned for at least six months and up to three years, and the person performing the abortion is subject to imprisonment for one to three years. The country does not collect data on abortion care and so there are no official statistics, other than measurements of "pregnancy with abortive outcome", which includes miscarriage, induced abortions, and other conditions. In 2019, this was measured as 1066 cases across Lebanon.

A report written for the ONHCR by Beirut-based feminist group Nisawiya in 2010 stated that abortions did occur in private clinics or doctors' homes for expensive fees, and that support groups and safe conditions for such procedures were non-existent. A 2019 study featuring 119 interviews with women who had had abortions as well as with physicians who offered abortion services argued that the right to safe abortion in Lebanon was a privilege rather than right, and was heavily reliant on the individual's social capital, social networks and her ability to negotiate with her partner and her doctor. The study also found that the price of an illegal abortion - which depends heavily on the physician's credentials, the location of the clinic, and the form of care required - can range between $150 to $2400 (USD, 2019).

The Guttmacher Institute estimated in 2020 that over a quarter of a million women in Lebanon had an unmet need for modern contraception.

=== Non communicable diseases ===
Deaths from cardiovascular diseases, 1980 to 2023, Lebanon

==== Cardiovascular diseases ====
Cardiovascular diseases represent the leading cause of morbidity and mortality in Lebanon and are also the primary cause of hospital admission. In 2012, it was estimated that 31% of all deaths in Lebanon were due to ischemic heart disease. This high cardiovascular disease incidence can be attributed to several risk factors. For example, 42% of the Lebanese people are smokers, 29.4% are obese, 22.8% are diabetic, and 29.8% suffer from hypertension.

Deaths from cancer, 1980 to 2023, Lebanon. Our World in Data.

==== Cancers ====
Data from World Health Organization (WHO) Globocan 2012 have shown that in the Arab world, Lebanon has the highest lung cancer incidence in females and the third highest in males, with an age-standardized incidence rate among the world population (ASR(w)) per 100,000 person-years of 30.2% in men and 11% in women. Similarly, it has been reported that Lebanon has one of the highest ASR(w) of bladder cancer worldwide, with 29.1 as estimated ASR(w) of bladder cancer among males, thus falling second after Belgium (31.0). Trends in high lung and bladder cancer incidence are largely the product of changing smoking prevalence and patterns of tobacco consumption. Smoking is very prevalent and culturally ingrained into Lebanese society, with the most common forms of tobacco smoking in Lebanon being cigarettes or waterpipe smoking, which is gaining popularity, particularly among females. Relative to a single cigarette, a single waterpipe use episode is associated with similar peak plasma nicotine levels and three times greater peak levels of blood carboxyhemoglobin. The first five minutes of waterpipe smoking produce more than four times the increase in blood carboxyhemoglobin as smoking an entire cigarette. Adult smoking in Lebanon is estimated at 46% for males and 31% for females. Smoking prevalence among the youth is estimated to be among the highest worldwide (65.8% for boys and 54.1% for girls), with waterpipe smoking the major form of smoking (33.9%) followed by cigarette smoking (8.6%). In addition to smoking, urban air pollution measured by concentrations of particulate matter <10 mm in size exceeds the levels set by the WHO (20 mg/m3) in most urban Lebanese cities.

In June 2025 it was reported about a counterfeit medication scandal. This was a major public health and criminal case in Lebanon involving the smuggling, distribution, and administration of counterfeit cancer drugs. The scandal has raised national and international concern after it was revealed that fake medications were substituted for essential chemotherapy treatments, potentially endangering the lives of hundreds of patients.

==== Mental health ====
Deaths from mental health and substance use disorders WHO, 2000 to 2021, Lebanon

Lebanon, a society of people generally wrought by war and loss, is currently plagued with mental health issues where a staggering 17% of citizens suffer from some form of non-war related mental illness. Having only three dedicated psychiatric facilities, but frequent access to psychiatrists and therapy, means that Lebanese has somewhat lacking access to psychiatric treatment by Western standards, but still better access than the rest of the Middle East and the Levant. Cultural stigma, however, often prevents sufferers from receiving the proper care they require and more often than not ends badly.

The WHO indicated that 49% of Lebanese are afflicted with some form of war-related trauma. This often includes former combatants, as well as many victims of the combat, suffering from PTSD. Furthermore, many victims of rape are subject to fear of stigma and do not report their victimization, thus preventing them proper medical and psychiatric treatment, and more importantly, justice.

There is, on average, an attempted suicide 6 hours in Lebanon, with a death by suicide every 2.5 days. “Embrace Lifeline”, Lebanon's first suicide prevention hotline was established in 2016. This is part of the “Mental Health and Substance Use-Prevention, Promotion and Treatment-Strategy for Lebanon 2015–2020", launched by the Lebanese Ministry of Public Health to create a more effective and comprehensive mental health treatment infrastructure in Lebanon.

== See also ==
- Water supply and sanitation in Lebanon
- Abortion in Lebanon
- Ministry of Public Health (Lebanon)
- Lebanon
