= Georges Naccache =

Lebanese journalist

Georges Naccache (Arabic: جورج نقاش, born 1904 - 1972) was a Lebanese journalist, poet, politician, diplomat, and the founder of the L'Orient newspaper, which later became L'Orient-Le Jour.

== Biography ==
He was born on May 8, 1904.

In 1924, at only 20 years old, he founded the French-speaking Lebanese daily L'Orient, which in 1971 became L'Orient-Le Jour after merging with Le Jour.

In 1936, he participated in the foundation of the Kataeb Party with Pierre Gemayel and Charles Helou, but left the party one year later in 1937, just like President Helou did.

He is the author of a famous editorial published on March 10, 1949, under the title: "Two negations do not make a nation", which earned him three months in prison, and six months suspension from L'Orient.

He then became a minister several times as well as the Lebanese ambassador to Paris.
