= Shamma Al-Kuwari =

Shamma Al-Kuwari (Arabic: كواري، شمة شاهين; born 1972) is a Qatari novelist and short-story writer.

== Life ==
Al-Kuwari was born and raised in Doha. She gained a bachelor's degree in organic medical sciences, from Qatar University, and a master's degree from Hamad Bin Khalifa University. As a journalist, Al-Kuwari has written for Qatari newspapers including Al Raya, Al 'Arabi and Al Maraya, and written a weekly column for Al Sharq.

== Works ==
- Nahnu nazra' al-hubb [We sow love: short stories], 1995.
- Hatūn nūr al-ʻuyūn : riwāyah [Hatoon Noor Al-Ayoun: a novel]. 2015.
- Alqāk baʻda ʻishrīn ʻāmman : riwāyah [See you after twenty years : a novel]. 2016.
- Wardat wa-khams batlāt : majmūʻah qiṣaṣīyah [A rose and five petals: a collection of short stories]. 2016.
- Lā aḥad lī siwāki : riwāyah [Nobody but me: a novel]. 2017.
- al-Ẓill wa-al-ḍawʼ : sīrat fatá ʻabra zaman al-umniyāt : riwāyah [Shadow and Light: A Boy Through the Age of Wishes: a novel]. 2017.
- Yamlaʼ al-tasāmuḥ qalbī : majmūʻah qiṣaṣīyah lil-nāshiʼah [Tolerance fills my heart: a short story collection for young people]. 2017.
- Mughāmarāt Fahd wa-Rawḍah maʻa Aws : qiṣṣat muṣawwarah li-aṭfāl [The Adventures of Fahd and Kindergarten with Aws: An illustrated story for children]. 2017.
- al-Safīnah al-Fīnīqīyah 5252 : riwāyah [The Phoenician Ship 5252: A Novel]. 2018.
