= Qatar TV 2 =

Qatari public television channel

- Country: Qatar
- Broadcast area: Middle East and North Africa
- Headquarters: Doha, Qatar

Programming
- Language: Arabic
- Picture format: 1080i HDTV

Ownership
- Owner: Qatar Media Corporation

History
- Launched: 1982; 44 years ago (first version); 23 July 2020; 5 years ago (second version)

Links
- Website: qtv.qa

Qatar TV 2, historically known as Channel 37, is a Qatari television channel owned by Qatar Media Corporation. Its past version largely catered at expats living in Qatar while its current version mainly airs archived content.

== History ==
=== First version (Channel 37) ===
Qatar Television launched its Second Program in 1982, which was nicknamed Channel 37 due to its frequency. As with other like-minded second channels operated by state broadcasters in the Gulf region, the channel mainly broadcast in English; by the early 1990s, broadcasts began in the late afternoon hours and ended at midnight. Programming mostly included American and Indian series and movies. The channel closed on 27 July 2014; the reasons for which are unknown.

=== Second version ===
Qatar Media Corporation relaunched the channel on 23 July 2020. Unlike the previous version which was dedicated mainly to sports and foreign programming, the new version airs archived programming from Qatar Television's archives. The channel was planned before 2020.

=== Planned revival of Channel 37 (as a standalone channel) ===
In October 2021, QMC announced that it would relaunch Channel 37 likely as a standalone channel. It was going to emulate the format of the Second Channel's prior version, aimed at expatriates, and would air a mixture of original and acquired foreign programming. The number 37, which was the frequency of the former channel, was used in this iteration to represent "the optimal and healthy temperature of the human body". At the time, the channel's staff was being composed, and was preparing a launch night special featuring recollections from viewers who remember watching the original Channel 37. It was meant to launch in the third quarter of 2022, but would be launched earlier under an emergency plan. The relaunched service would also employ 4K and OTT technologies and cover the 2022 FIFA World Cup.

It is not known what happened to the linear channel plan. It was reported that Channel 37 was producing videos as of June 2024.

== See also ==
- Television in Qatar
