= Death of a child =

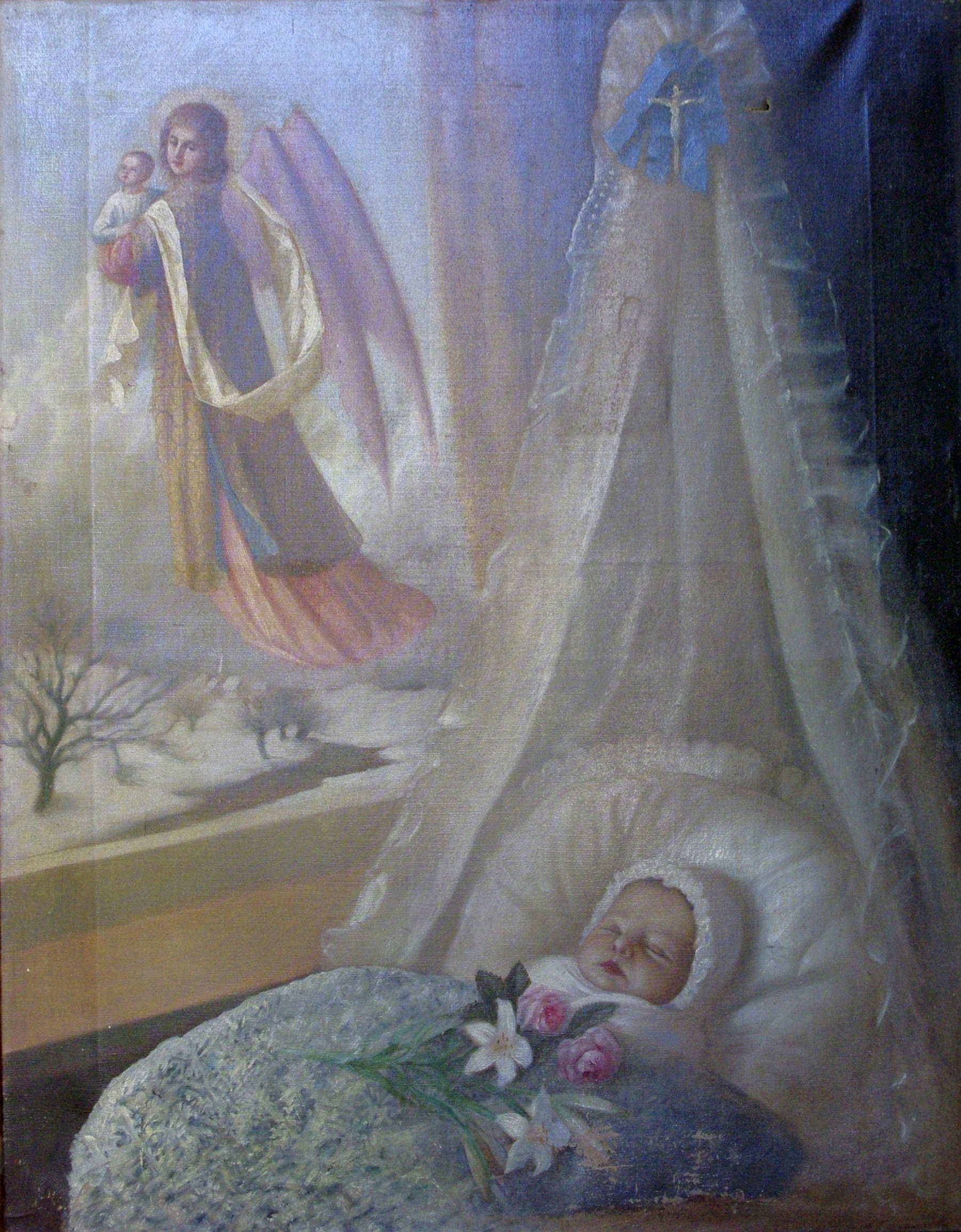
Painting by Adolphe Tassin (1852-1923) whose daughter died at 3 days old (1889).

Death of a child, or death in childhood, or death of children and youth, refers to the death of children and young people over one year of age. Deaths prior to age one are classified as infant deaths. The upper bound for distinguishing between child and adult is culturally mediated, and may range from 13 to 18. Child mortality refers to the collective deaths of humans in this age range. Some classifications of child mortality limit the age range from one to five years of age.

The death of a child is considered one of the greatest tragedies that can be experienced by human beings. When faced with the death of a child, bearing witness and providing comfort to the bereaved are traditional behaviors.

== See also ==
- Pregnancy loss
