= Hamad bin Thamer Al Thani =

Qatari businessman

Hamad bin Thamer bin Thani Al Thani
- Born: Doha, Qatar
- Education: Qatar University
- Employer: Al Jazeera Media Network
- Children: 7

Sheikh Hamad bin Thamer bin Mohammed Al Thani (Arabic: حمد بن ثامر بن محمد آل ثاني) is the chairman of the board of the Al Jazeera Media Network, based in Qatar, and also heads the state-owned broadcasting network Qatar Media Corporation. He is a member of the ruling family of Qatar, the House of Thani, and a cousin of the Father Emir Hamad bin Khalifa Al Thani, father of the current emir Tamim bin Hamad.

== Career ==
Al Thani has a journalism degree from Qatar University.

According to Al Thani, his career began in 1987 when he joined the Ministry of Information in Qatar, first in the printing and publications department, and after that in the Foreign Information Agency. Later, he became the first undersecretary to the minister of information, until 1994 when the ministry was abolished. At around the end of 1994, he was chosen as founding chairman of the board of Al Jazeera. He has remained chairman of the board ever since, and also leads the state-owned Qatar Media Corporation.
