= Kaltham Jaber =

Qatari writer and poet (born 1958)

Kaltham Jaber (Arabic: كلثم جبر, full name: Kaltham Jaber Al-Kuwari; born 1958 in Doha, Qatar) is a Qatari writer and poet. Considered a pioneer among women writers in the country, she was the first Qatari woman to author a collection of short stories, doing so in 1978. This feat also made her the first Qatari woman to publish a major work. She teaches in the Department of Social Sciences at Qatar University.

== Personal life and education ==
Jaber's father was Jaber bin Mohammed Al-Kuwari, a Qatari poet.

She attained her Master of Social Work degree from Helwan University in 1992. She then achieved a doctorate degree from Cairo University in 1997.

== Career ==
Her career as a writer began in the mid-seventies with Al-Oruba, a Qatari magazine established in 1971 that published short stories. In 1978, Jaber became the first Qatari woman to write an anthology of short stories, entitled "Ania wa Ghabat as-Samt wa at-Taraddud". The main focus of these stories is the desire for Qatari women to have a role in restructuring social norms and cultural conceptions.

She wrote the short story The Face of An Arab Woman in 1993, earning her the Creativity Award from Al Jasra Cultural and Social Club in 2001. In 1999, she co-authored a collection of short stories, geared mainly towards children, with Saudi author Khalil Al-Fazie.

In 1998, Jaber served as a member of the first board of directors of the National Council for Culture, Arts and Heritage, which was the first stand-alone governmental agency to oversee cultural affairs in Qatar.

Jaber wrote an Arabic book entitled The Life Cycle in the Qatari Society Tradition, published in 2015 by Qatar Museums. Documenting the intricacies of the life of an average Qatari, the book is based on both, personal accounts, and a large-scale study carried out by the Qatar-based Arab Gulf States Folklore Centre in the early 1990s. It is equipped with numerous illustrations and contains facets about Qatari culture.

In 2016, she wrote two articles in Qatari daily Al Raya, advocating for women's rights and claiming that the discrepancy in rights between the two sexes in the Arab world results not from Islam or the Quran, but from the desire of men to control women. Furthermore, she proposed increased legislation to protect the rights of women.
