= Hanan Al-Fayyad =

Qatari academic and writer (born 1976)

Hanan Al-Fayyad (born 1976) is a Qatari academic and writer. She is a professor at Qatar University, and spokesperson for the Sheikh Hamad Award for Translation and International Understanding. She published a novel in 2014.

== Works ==
- La karama fi al-hubb (No Dignity in Love), 2014.
