= Shu'a' Khalifa =

Qatari novelist

Shu'a' Khalifa (شعاع خليفة ) is a Qatari novelist.

Khalifa was born in Doha. Along with her sister, Dalal Khalifa, she was one of the first two novelists to publish work in Qatar. Her first novel, al-Ubur ila al-haqiqa (Passage to Truth), was written in 1987, and was followed by Ahlam al-bahr al-qadima (The Old Dreams of the Sea), written in 1990; both were published in 1993. Her third novel, Fi intizar al-safira (Waiting for the Whistle), was published the following year. All three deal with questions of modern life and the modernization of Qatar, tempered by nostalgia for the past. They depict the transformation of the country in the oil era. Stylistically Khalifa employs descriptions of past society, tangents which have been said to weaken the structure of her novels.
