= Qatar Media Corporation =

Public service broadcasting network in Qatar

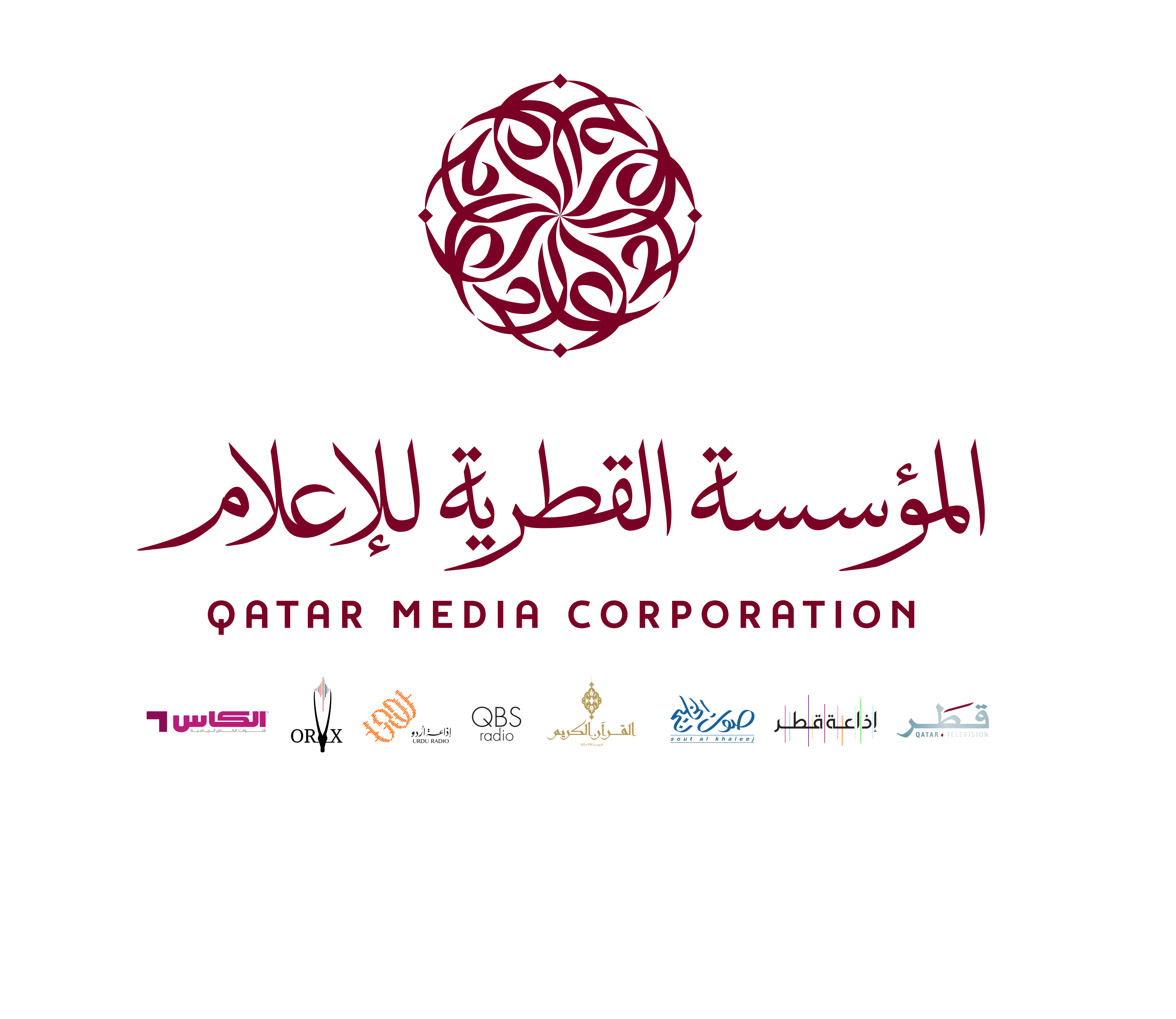
- Type: Broadcast radio, television and online
- Country: Qatar
- Headquarters: Doha, Qatar
- Owner: Qatari Government
- Key people: Hamad bin Thamer Al Thani (Chairman); Abdulaziz bin Thani Al Thani (CEO)
- Launch date: 2009; 17 years ago
- Official website: www.qmc.qa

Qatar Media Corporation (Arabic: المؤسسة القطرية للإعلام, romanized: al-Muʼassasah al-Qaṭarīyah lil-Iʻlām; formerly known as Qatar General Broadcasting and Television Corporation) is a state-owned broadcasting network in Qatar.

It is headed by member of the Qatari royal family Hamad bin Thamer Al Thani, who is also the Chairman of the Board of Directors of the Al Jazeera Media Network.

== History ==
It was incorporated on 27 April 1997. Several television channels and radio networks are being run by this organization, including Qatar TV and the Qatar Broadcasting Service (QBS) radio station, Qatar Radio. QMC is a member of the Asia-Pacific Broadcasting Union.

In 2022 QMC has launched Qatar Plus a new digital platform, and during the year the country completed the transition of television to digital terrestrial technology.

In 2024 Qatar Media Corporation (QMC) and the University of Doha for Science and Technology (UDST) have jointly signed a memorandum of understanding (MoU), for Science and Technology to bolster Qatar's media, tech education.

Former logo

== Services ==
=== Television ===
Name	Location	Тype	Launched	Language
Qatar TV	Doha	Generalist	1970	Arabic
Qatar TV 2	Doha	Generalist	1971	English

=== Radio ===
Name	Location	Тype	Launched	Languages
Qatar Radio	Doha	Generalist	1965	Arabic, English, French, Urdu

== See also ==
- Mass media in Qatar
