= Hajar Ahmed Hajar =

Qatari cardiologist, poet and government minister

Hajar Ahmed Hajar Albinali

Minister of Public Health
- In office 1999–2005

Personal details
- Born: 1943
- Occupation: Government minister, cardiologist, poet, writer

Hajar Ahmed Hajar Al Binali (Arabic: حجر أحمد حجر; born 1943) is a Qatari cardiologist, poet and former government minister. He authored several works, including diwans and literary studies. He has also published a number of articles in the field of cardiology.

He has been chairman of several organizations, including Hamad Medical Corporation and the Gulf Heart Association, an organization he founded in 2002.

== Education ==
He obtained a BA from University of Colorado Boulder in 1969 and earned an MD from the university's school of medicine in 1973.

== Career ==
=== Literature ===
Hajar's poetry often focuses on themes relating to his childhood. He views poetry as a way of preserving Qatari culture. In addition to compiling diwans or compendiums of poetry, he has also published literary studies on illnesses in poetry. He wrote two literature books analyzing the health problems of two famous Arab poets through their poems.

=== Government ===
He served as the Minister of Public Health from 1999 to 2005. Prior to being appointed as minister, he was undersecretary of the ministry from 1981 to 1993. He was appointed as public health adviser to the emir of Qatar in 2005.

=== Medical field ===
He has been recognized by the World Health Organization for his work in preventing tobacco use in Qatar on two occasions, the first being in 1992 and the latter in 2003. He was selected to deliver the opening lecture in the Second International Conference on Water-Pipe Tobacco Smoking in 2014. Hajar was also awarded the Qatar State Award for Medicine in 2009.

His first appointment in the medical field was as chief of cardiology of Rumeilah Hospital in 1978; a capacity he served in for four years. He is presently chairman of the cardiology department of Hamad Medical Corporation (HMC), having been appointed to that position in 1982. He was appointed chairman of HMC in 1998 and retained the position until 2003. He played a large role in efforts to open a Heart Hospital in HMC.

He became the first chairman of The International Society for the History of Islamic Medicine in 2000, and at present is the society's honorary president. In 2002, he founded and chaired the Gulf Heart Association, an organization which has been an affiliate of the European Society of Cardiology since 2005. The HMC board built an auditorium inside the medical center naming it after him in recognition of his works in health education. The auditorium is named the Hajar Auditorium.
