= Umm Aktham =

Qatari writer

Fatimah Turki
- Born: 1953 (age 72–73)
- Occupation: writer

Fatimah Abdullah al Turki (فاطمة عبد الله التركي, born 1953) is a Qatari writer, who has written under the pseudonym Umm Aktham( أمّاأكثم ) or Sarah(سارة) in the 1970s and 1980s.

== Styles and political views ==
In her writing, she sometimes attacked Arabic society for its disadvantages to women, but did not aspire a western liberal model. Critics describe how her writing highlights contradictions and contrasts, between reality and imagination, internal and external worlds, life and death, riches and poverty.

== Works ==
- Winter of the Eskimo (1978, شتاء الاسكيمو)
- 'Yawmiyat fi-l-manfa (يوميات في المنفى, Memoirs in exile)', in Layla Salih, ed., Adab al-mar ah fi al-Jazirah wa al-Khalij al-Arabi(Women's literature at the Arabian peninsula and Arabian gulf), 1983, pp. 266–74
