= Toxic abortion =

Miscarriage caused by environmental pollutants

Toxic abortion is a medical phenomenon of spontaneous abortion, miscarriage, or stillbirth caused by toxins in the environment of the mother during pregnancy, especially as caused by toxic environmental pollutants, though sometimes reported as caused by naturally occurring plant toxins

== In humans ==
The term "toxic abortion" was first used to identify this phenomenon in humans in the earliest studies of the effects of pollutants on pregnancy in 1928, An Experimental Investigation Concerning Toxic Abortion Produced by Chemical Agents by Morris M. Datnow M.D.

Toxic abortion chemicals studied at that time were: Petrochemicals, Heavy metals, Organic solvents, Tetrachloroethylene, Glycol ethers, 2-Bromopropane, Ethylene oxide, Anesthetic gases, and Antineoplastic drugs.

In 1932, the Journal of State Medicine reported on a natural variation, with the occurrence of "a considerable number of cases of toxic abortion" being caused by untreated dental caries.

Study of pollution-caused abortion in humans ceased for a considerable time, interest renewing in the 2000s. A 2009 study found that fossil fuels play a role, as "pregnant African-American women who live within a half mile of freeways and busy roads were three times more likely to have miscarriages than women who don't regularly breathe exhaust fumes." A 2011 study found a correlation between exposure to workplace toxins and spontaneous abortion, and called for further study. Newsweek magazine reported in May 2014 that a spike in stillborn babies in the town of Vernal, in Utah, had correlated with an increase in pollution from new gas and oil drilling. Newsweek reported that "Vernal's rate of neonatal mortality appears to have climbed from about average in 2010 (relative to national figures) to six times the normal rate three years later." Newsweek quoted one expert's observation that "We know that pregnant women who breathe more air pollution have much higher rates of virtually every adverse pregnancy outcome that exists." A study published in the Journal of Environmental Health in October 2014 found tetrachloroethylene or PCE, to be "linked to increased risk for stillbirths and other pregnancy complications."

The PCE study found that "pregnancies with high exposure to PCE were 2.4 times more likely to end with stillborn babies and 1.4 times more likely to experience placental abruption — when the placenta peels away from uterine wall before delivery, causing the mother to bleed and the baby to lose oxygen — compared with pregnancies never exposed to PCE." Higher exposure lead to a 35 percent higher risk of abruption. PCE has also been tied to an increased risk for cancer. Children exposed to PCE as fetuses and toddlers are more likely to use drugs later in life. The toxin has been linked to mental illness, an increased risk of breast cancer and some birth defects. It has been tied to anxiety, depression, and impairments in cognition, memory and attention. PCE contamination has been found in the Massachusetts water supply and "on military bases across the country," and "water systems in California and Pennsylvania and have also been found to be contaminated with PCE."

In 2015, Newsweek reported that chemicals found in fast food wrappers multiply miscarriage risk by sixteen times.

Some instances have been reported of women intentionally seeking to induce toxic abortion, where circumstances make medical abortion difficult to obtain, by exposing themselves to environmental toxins.

== In animals ==
Toxic abortion is observed in both humans and in animals such as cows, hares, and horses. The source notes that animal ingestion of "low quality forage having some toxicity" harms livestock health, especially with cattle and horses, leading to numerous cases of "toxic abortion, gastro-enteritis and abortion with dystrophic and haemorrhagic lesions of the foetus." Cadmium has been identified as a chemical pollutant identified with toxic abortion in animals.
