= Dalal Khalifa =

Qatari novelist and playwright

Dalal Khalifa (دلال خليفة) is a Qatari novelist and playwright.

Along with her sister, Shu'a', Khalifa was one of the first writers in Qatar to publish novels. She has also written plays, publishing three together in one volume, Insan fi hayz al-wujud (A Person in the Sphere of Existence), in 1995. A native of Doha, she received her bachelor's degree in English from Qatar University and also possesses a master's degree in translation from Heriot-Watt University. At one time head of the Foreign Publications Unit, she also led the women's cultural forum Marasina.
