= Qatar Tribune =

Qatari English-language newspaper

- Type: Daily newspaper
- Format: Print, online
- Owner: Hamad bin Jassim Al Thani
- Publisher: Dar Al-Watan Printing, Publishing and Distribution Company
- Founded: 2006
- Political alignment: Pro-government
- Language: English
- Website: qatar-tribune.com

Qatar Tribune is an English-language pro-government newspaper published in Doha, Qatar with local and international coverage. It was launched in 2006. The newspaper's motto is "First with the News and What's Behind it". It is published both in print and online.

Through its publisher, it is majority-owned by former Foreign Minister and Prime Minister Hamad bin Jassim Al Thani, a senior member of the Qatari royal family and a cousin of the emir. Al-Watan is Qatar Tribune's Arabic-language sister newspaper.
