= Abortion in Lebanon =

Abortion in Lebanon is criminalised in all cases except for when the mother's life is at risk according to Lebanon's Penal Code, which was established in 1943. A woman who has an abortion may be imprisoned for at least six months and up to three years, and the person performing the abortion is subject to imprisonment for one to three years. The country does not collect data on abortion care and so there are no official statistics, other than measurements of "pregnancy with abortive outcome", which includes miscarriage, induced abortions, and other conditions. In 2019, this was measured as 1066 cases across Lebanon.

A report written for the ONHCR by Beirut-based feminist group Nisawiya in 2010 stated that abortions did occur in private clinics or doctors' homes for expensive fees, and that support groups and safe conditions for such procedures were non-existent. A 2019 study featuring 119 interviews with women who had had abortions as well as with physicians who offered abortion services argued that the right to safe abortion in Lebanon was a privilege rather than right, and was heavily reliant on the individual's social capital, social networks and her ability to negotiate with her partner and her doctor. The study also found that the price of an illegal abortion - which depends heavily on the physician's credentials, the location of the clinic, and the form of care required - can range between $150 to $2400 (USD, 2019).

The Guttmacher Institute estimated in 2020 that over a quarter of a million women in Lebanon had an unmet need for modern contraception.
