= Pregnancy with abortive outcome =

Medical diagnosis and treatment category

Pregnancy with abortive outcome is a medical diagnosis and treatment category. According to the U.S. National Library of Medicine, pregnancy with abortive outcome is defined as "unintentional or intentional loss of a pregnancy before 22 weeks gestation."

Conditions and circumstances within this category include:

- Complications following ectopic and molar pregnancy
- Complications following (induced) termination of pregnancy
- Ectopic pregnancy
- Failed attempted termination of pregnancy
- Hydatidiform mole
- Other abnormal products of conception
- Spontaneous abortion (a miscarriage)

== See also ==
- Perinatal death
- Stillbirth

== External ilnks ==
- Media related to Pregnancy with abortive outcome at Wikimedia Commons
