= Hamad Al Thani =

Sheikh Hamad Al Thani may refer to Qatari royalty, with Hamad given name and Al Thani as clan name:

- Hamad bin Abdullah Al Thani (1896–1948), full name Hamad bin Abdullah bin Jassim bin Muhammed Al Thani, father of the preceding Emir of Qatar, grandfather of the current Emir
  - Hamad bin Jassim bin Hamad Al Thani (born 1959), full name Hamad bin Jassim bin Hamad bin Abdullah bin Jassim bin Muhammed Al Thani, coup leader, his grandson
  - Hamad bin Khalifa Al Thani (born 1952), former Emir of Qatar, his grandson
  - Hamad bin Suhaim Al Thani (born 1958), full name Hamad bin Suhaim bin Hamad bin Abdullah bin Jassim bin Muhammed Al Thani, his grandson
  - Hamad bin Khalid Al Thani (1952–2012), full name Hamad bin Khalid bin Hamad bin Abdullah bin Jassim bin Muhammed Al Thani, his grandson
- Hamad bin Jassim bin Jaber Al Thani (born 1959), full name Hamad bin Jassim bin Jaber bin Muhammad Al Thani, cousin of Hamad bin Abdullah
