= The Peninsula (newspaper) =

Daily newspaper in Doha, Qatar

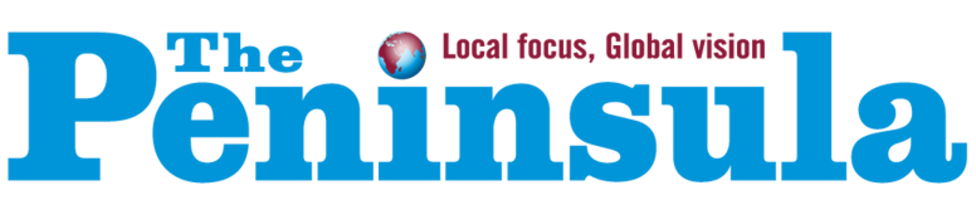
- Type: Daily newspaper
- Format: Broadsheet
- Owner: Khalid bin Thani Al Thani
- Founder: Dar Al-Sharq Media Group
- Editor-in-chief: Dr. Khalid bin Mubarak Al-Shafi
- Founded: 1996; 30 years ago
- Language: English
- Headquarters: Doha, Qatar
- Sister newspapers: Al Sharq
- Website: thepeninsulaqatar.com

The Peninsula is an English-language pro-government daily newspaper published in Doha, Qatar. Its main competitors are the Gulf Times and the Qatar Tribune.

Through its publisher, Dar Al-Sharq Media Group, it is owned by a senior member of the Qatari ruling family, Khalid bin Thani Al Thani, who is also chairman of the paper. Al Sharq is The Peninsula's Arabic-language sister newspaper.

== History and reception ==
The Peninsula was launched in 1996 by Dar Al-Sharq Media Group.

It reported receiving more than 65 million pageviews on its website in 2020.

== Ownership, editorial stance and financing ==
The Peninsula's publisher, Dar Al-Sharq Media Group, is owned by a senior member of the Qatari ruling family, Khalid bin Thani Al Thani. Al Sharq is its English-language sister newspaper. Arabic-language business daily Lusail, launched in February 2016, is also owned by same publisher, as is the Arabic-language political daily Al Arab.

The Peninsula has a pro-government political stance. The paper's strategic and editorial decisions are controlled directly by its owner, who is very close with Qatar's ruling elite. The publication is widely seen as an extension of the communication strategy of the government, as is its sister publication Al Sharq.

While its finances are opaque, it is known to primarily rely on income from advertising, especially from "state entities and affiliated companies". According to State Media Monitor, it may also receive some direct government support.
