= Media and Journalism Research Center =

Media think tank

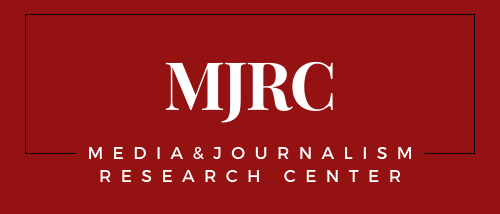
- Formation: 2004; 22 years ago
- Type: Research center
- Director: Marius Dragomir
- Website: journalismresearch.org
- Formerly called: Center for Media, Data and Society (2014–2022); Center for Media and Communication Studies (2004–2014)

The Media and Journalism Research Center is a think tank that produces scholarly and practice-oriented research about journalism, media freedom, and internet policy. The organization maintains a cooperation agreement with the University of Santiago de Compostela.

The center is known for identifying trends in the use of media technologies and advancing policy discussions about media policy, state media, media ownership, and media capture.

== History ==
The center was founded as the Center for Media and Communication Studies at Central European University (CEU) in Budapest, Hungary. It began in 2004, and was designed to serve as a focal point an international network of scholars and academic institutions, whose research ranges from media and communications policy, fundamental communications rights through media and civil society and new media and digital technology to media in transition. In September 2014 it was relaunched as the Center for Media, Data and Society (CMDS) to represent new interests in technology policy and big data. Philip N. Howard led the Center from 2013-2015. Media expert, journalist and scholar Marius Dragomir led the center starting in September 2016. Most of CMDS' projects are continued by the Media and Journalism Research Center, a research institute established by Marius Dragomir in October 2022 that is independent of CEU.

== Projects ==
The CMDS' research projects focused on identifying trends and challenges in the use of information technologies and advancing policy discussions about the regulation of data and media. Projects that CMDS has contributed to have included Creative Approaches to Living Cultural Archives, Ranking Digital Rights, Strengthening Journalism in Europe, Research on Violent Online Political Extremism. Its projects have been funded by the Open Society Foundations, National Endowment for Democracy, European Union, Media Development Investment Fund, Internews Network, Thomson Foundation, Thomson Reuters Foundation, and the Prague Civil Society Center.

The center has also been known for its monitoring work on media policy. Since its launch in 2017, the Media Influence Matrix project has expanded to over 50 countries. The center is also known for its research on media capture, co-funded by the European Commission. Dragomir has published studies that attempted to define and analyze the media capture phenomenon occurring in both public and private media outlets. In 2018, CMDS joined the Journalism Trust Initiative. The MJRC's research on public service media and state media was cited in articles published by the European Journal of Communication and The Political Quarterly in 2024. Dragomir has co-authored academic journal articles about public service media and online disinformation, as well as a report for UNESCO in 2020 on editorial independence and state-captured private media. That report was used to prepare a broader report released in 2022 on global trends on freedom of expression and media development.

=== State Media Monitor ===
The State Media Monitor serves as a database that analyzes outlets around the world based on factors like editorial independence, funding, and ownership/governance. The 2024 State Media Monitor list, including the evaluation of new sources, was released in September. The 2025 State Media Monitor list, including the updated profiles and a global comparative overview, was released in September.

State Media Monitor ratings
Rating	Funding	Ownership/ Governance	Editorial control	Official description	Performance
Independent public (IP)	No	No	No	Public service media whose funding and governing mechanisms are designed in such a way as to fully insulate them from government interference.	Highest level of independence
Independent state-managed/state-owned (ISM)	No	Yes	No	Public service media not predominantly funded from state budget resources that are either owned by the state or whose governing bodies are controlled by the government, which, however, does not attempt to control their editorial agenda.	Risk of politicisation
Independent state-funded (ISF)	Yes	No	No	Public service media whose main funding source is the state, which, however, does not own them or control their governing bodies, and does not attempt to control their editorial agenda.	Vulnerable to financial pressure
Independent state-funded and state-managed (ISFM)	Yes	Yes	No	Public service media whose main funding source is the state, which owns them or controls their governing bodies, without, however, attempting to control their editorial agenda.	Medium; risk of capture
Captured private (CaPr)	No	Yes	Yes	Privately owned media outlets dependent to a large degree on the government for funding or other privileges (i.e. state advertising or public procurement contracts for other businesses run by their owners).	Editorial agenda aligned with government
Captured public/state-managed (CaPu)	Maybe	Yes	Yes	Public service or state-owned media not predominantly financed through state budget resources, where the state is using its status as owner and/or its control over the management of these outlets to influence their editorial agenda.	Staffed by government loyalists
State-controlled (SC)	Yes	Yes	Yes	State media created as propaganda channels, typical for authoritarian regimes, or failed public media in which the government retains a major role, funding and owning them, controlling their management and closely supervising their editorial agenda.	Lowest level of independence

== See also ==
- Berkman Center for Internet & Society
- Center for Global Communication Studies at Annenberg School for Communication at the University of Pennsylvania
- Oxford Internet Institute
