= Al Arab =

Qatari newspaper

- Type: Daily e-newspaper
- Format: e-newspaper
- Owner: Dar Al-Sharq Media Group
- Editor-in-chief: Abdullah Taleb Al-Marri
- Associate editor: Mohammed Haji
- Founded: 6 March 1972; 2007 (as an online newspaper)
- Ceased publication: 1995 (print)
- Language: Arabic
- Headquarters: Doha
- Sister newspapers: Al Sharq; The Peninsula
- Website: Al Arab

Al Arab (Arabic: العرب, lit. 'The Arabs') was the first Arabic daily following the independence of Qatar. It was printed between 1972 and 1995 and was relaunched on 18 November 2007 as an e-newspaper which is based in Doha, Qatar.

== History and profile ==
Al Arab was established in 1972. The paper was first published on 6 March 1972 as a weekly tabloid and became Qatar's first post-independence Arabic publication. The paper is also the first political paper of the country.

The founder and the first editor-in-chief of the daily was Qatari intellectual Abdullah Hussein Nemma, known as "Dean" of the Qatari press. The publisher was Dar Al Orouba. Al Arab was converted into a broadsheet daily on 22 February 1974. It was closed down in 1995. The license of the paper was sold by Nemma's family to the Minister of Foreign Affairs Hamad bin Jassim Al Thani in the 1990s.

It was relaunched on 18 November 2007 as online newspaper. Abdulaziz Al-Mahmoud who also contributed to the foundation of the daily was named as editor-in-chief and served in the post until November 2009. As of 2013 Ahmed Al Romaihi was the editor-in-chief of the paper and his deputy is Mohammed Haji.

In July 2020 the newspaper canceled its paper edition and continued to be published on the website. Its owner is Dar Al Arab.

== Political stance and content ==
Al Arab in its first period has an independent political stance. In 2013, BBC describes it as a pro-government paper.

In 2009, Al Arab contributor Samar Al Mogren, a Saudi Arabian novelist and feminist, received death threats due to her article in which she criticized Saudi cleric Mohammed Al Arifi for vilifying Shiites and calling Iraqi Ayatollah Sistani "an Infidel". In August 2013, Faisal Al Marzoqi published an article in the daily, accusing the officials of the Qatar Museums Authority of power misuse. The criticism also indirectly targeted Al Mayassa Al Thani, chairperson of the authority and caused reaction by the Qatari officials.

== Activities ==
The daily was one of the media sponsors for the Schools Olympic Program (SOP) in March 2013.

== See also ==
- List of newspapers in Qatar
