= Al-Watan (Qatar) =

Qatari newspaper

Al-Watan الوطن
- Type: Daily newspaper
- Format: Print, online
- Owner: Hamad bin Jassim Al Thani
- Publisher: Dar Al-Watan Printing, Publishing and Distribution Company
- Founded: 1995; 31 years ago
- Political alignment: Pro-government
- Language: Arabic
- Headquarters: Doha
- Circulation: 15,000 (2008)
- Sister newspapers: Qatar Tribune
- Website: al-watan.com

Al-Watan (Arabic: الوطن, lit. 'The Homeland') is a pro-government Arabic-language daily political newspaper based in Doha, Qatar. It is one of the three leading Arabic-language newspapers in the country along with Al Raya and Al Sharq.

Through its publisher, it is majority-owned by former Foreign Minister and Prime Minister Hamad bin Jassim Al Thani, a senior member of the Qatari royal family and a cousin of the emir. Qatar Tribune is Al-Watan's English-language sister newspaper.

== History and circulation ==
Al-Watan was founded in 1995 and was the first newspaper to be launched in Qatar after the Emir, Sheikh Hamad bin Khalifa Al Thani, abolished press censorship. Its parent company is Dar Al Watan Printing, Publishing and Distribution Company. With the publication of the daily the other leading Qatari Arabic paper Al Raya lost its one-third of its circulation. The 2008 circulation of the daily was 15,000.

In 2020, the website Industry Arabic named Al-Watan as the fourth most influential Arabic newspaper in the world.

== Ownership ==
Former Foreign Minister and Prime Minister Hamad bin Jassim Al Thani, a senior member of the Qatari royal family and a cousin of the emir, owns half of the newspaper. Qatar Tribune is its English-language sister newspaper.
