= Al Sharq =

Arabic daily newspaper in Doha, Qatar

- Type: Daily newspaper
- Owner: Khalid bin Thani Al Thani
- Publisher: Dar Al-Sharq Media Group
- Founded: 1987; 39 years ago
- Political alignment: Pro-government
- Language: Arabic
- Headquarters: Doha
- Country: Qatar
- Sister newspapers: The Peninsula
- Website: Al Sharq

Al Sharq (Arabic: الشرق, lit. 'The Orient') is an Arabic-language pro-government daily newspaper published in Doha, Qatar. It is one of the three leading Arabic-language newspapers in the country, alongside Al Raya and Al Watan.

Through its publisher, Dar Al-Sharq Media Group, it is owned by a senior member of the Qatari ruling family, Khalid bin Thani Al Thani. The Peninsula is Al Sharq's English-language sister newspaper.

== History and profile ==
Al Sharq was launched in 1987 and was published by Al Watan Printing and Publishing House under the name of Al Khaleej Al Youm (Arabic: Gulf Today). Eighteen months after its establishment it was sold to Dar Al-Sharq Media Group, and the paper was renamed as Al Sharq.

Al Sharq is based in Doha. As of 2012 the editor and manager of Al Sharq was Abdul Latif Al Mahmoud. Jaber Al Harami was the editor-in-chief in 2016.

In 1996, Al Sharq briefly dedicated a page to environmental issues, but this was soon ended. After that, articles and reports on environmental topics were published sporadically. In addition, it has large supplements on sports, business and finance. Since June 2012, the daily has offered a monthly supplement which is developed by Anadolu Agency's Middle East and Africa regional directorate.

In 2011, Al Sharq was one of the 50 most powerful online Arab newspapers according to Forbes.

The circulation of Al Sharq was about 10,000 in the early 1990s. In 2000 the paper reached a circulation of 47,000 circulation. Its estimated circulation in 2003 was 15,000 copies. In 2008 the daily also sold 15,000 copies.

== Ownership, editorial stance and financing ==
Al Sharq's publisher, Dar Al-Sharq Media Group, is owned by a senior member of the Qatari ruling family, Khalid bin Thani Al Thani. The Peninsula is its English-language sister newspaper.

Al Sharq has a pro-government political stance. The paper's strategic and editorial decisions are controlled directly by its owner, who is very close with Qatar's ruling elite. The publication is widely seen as an extension of the communication strategy of the government, as is its sister publication The Peninsula.

While its finances are opaque, it is known to primarily rely on income from advertising, especially from "state entities and affiliated companies". According to State Media Monitor, it may also receive some direct government support.

In 2008, however, a Jordanian journalist working for the daily was sentenced to three-year imprisonment due to an article in which she criticized the administration of Hamad hospital.

While reporting the events following the 2013 coup in Egypt Al Sharq praised security forces while its rival Al Raya, another Arabic Qatari paper, emphasized the demonstrations by the supporters of the Muslim Brotherhood and ousted President Mohamed Morsi.
