= Environmental Science Center =

Research center in Qatar University

- مركز العلوم البيئية
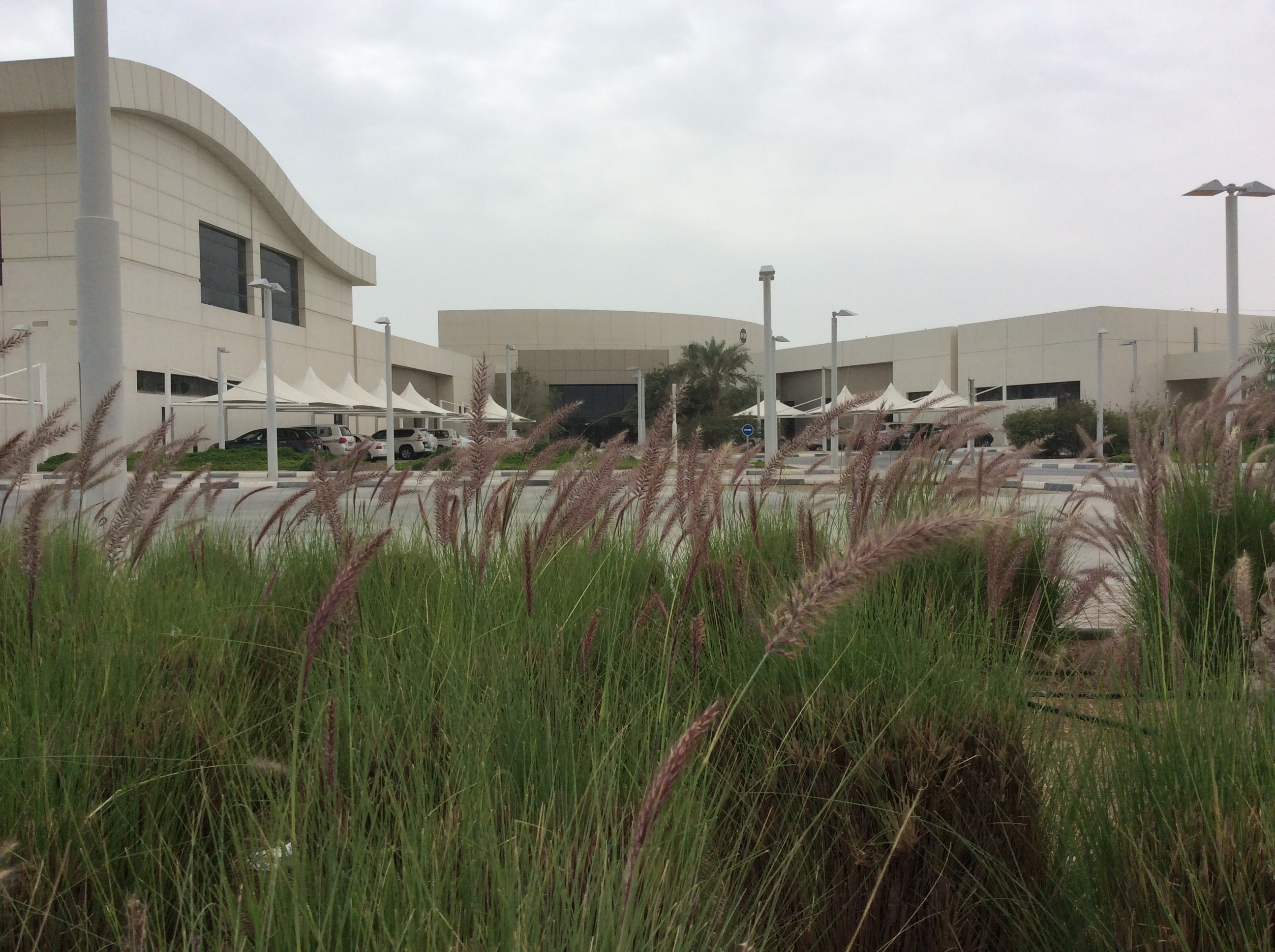
- Abbreviation: ESC
- Formation: 1980
- Headquarters: Qatar University
- Location: Doha, Qatar
- Region served: Middle East
- Services: Research and Education
- Fields: Environment
- Official language: Arabic and English
- Website: http://www.qu.edu.qa/research/esc

The Environmental Science Center is a research center at Qatar University and was established in 1980 to promote environmental studies across the state of Qatar with main focus on marine science, atmospheric and biological sciences. For the past 18 years, ESC monitored and studied Hawksbill turtle nesting sites in Qatar.

== History ==
- In 1980 it was named Scientific and Applied Research Center (SARC).
- In 2005 it was restructured and renamed Environmental Studies Center (ESC).
- In 2015, the business name was changed to Environmental Science Center (ESC) to better reflect the research-driven objectives.

== Research clusters ==
The ESC has 3 major research clusters that cover areas of strategic importance to Qatar. The clusters are:

- Atmospheric sciences cluster
- Earth sciences cluster
- Marine sciences cluster with 2 majors:
  - Terrestrial Ecology
  - Physical and Chemical Oceanography

== UNESCO Chair in marine sciences ==
The first of its kind in the Arabian Gulf region, United Nations Educational, Scientific and Cultural Organization (UNESCO) have announced the establishment of the UNESCO Chair in marine sciences at QU's Environmental Science Center. The chair is aiming to providing sustainable marine environment in the Arabian Gulf and protection of marine ecosystems.

== Inventions ==
- Marine clutch technology.
- Mushroom artificial reef technology (mushroom forest).

== Accreditation ==
The ESC labs have been granted ISO/IEC 17025 by American Association of Laboratory Accreditation (A2LA), affirming their status as world-class facilities operating to best practice.

== Facilities ==
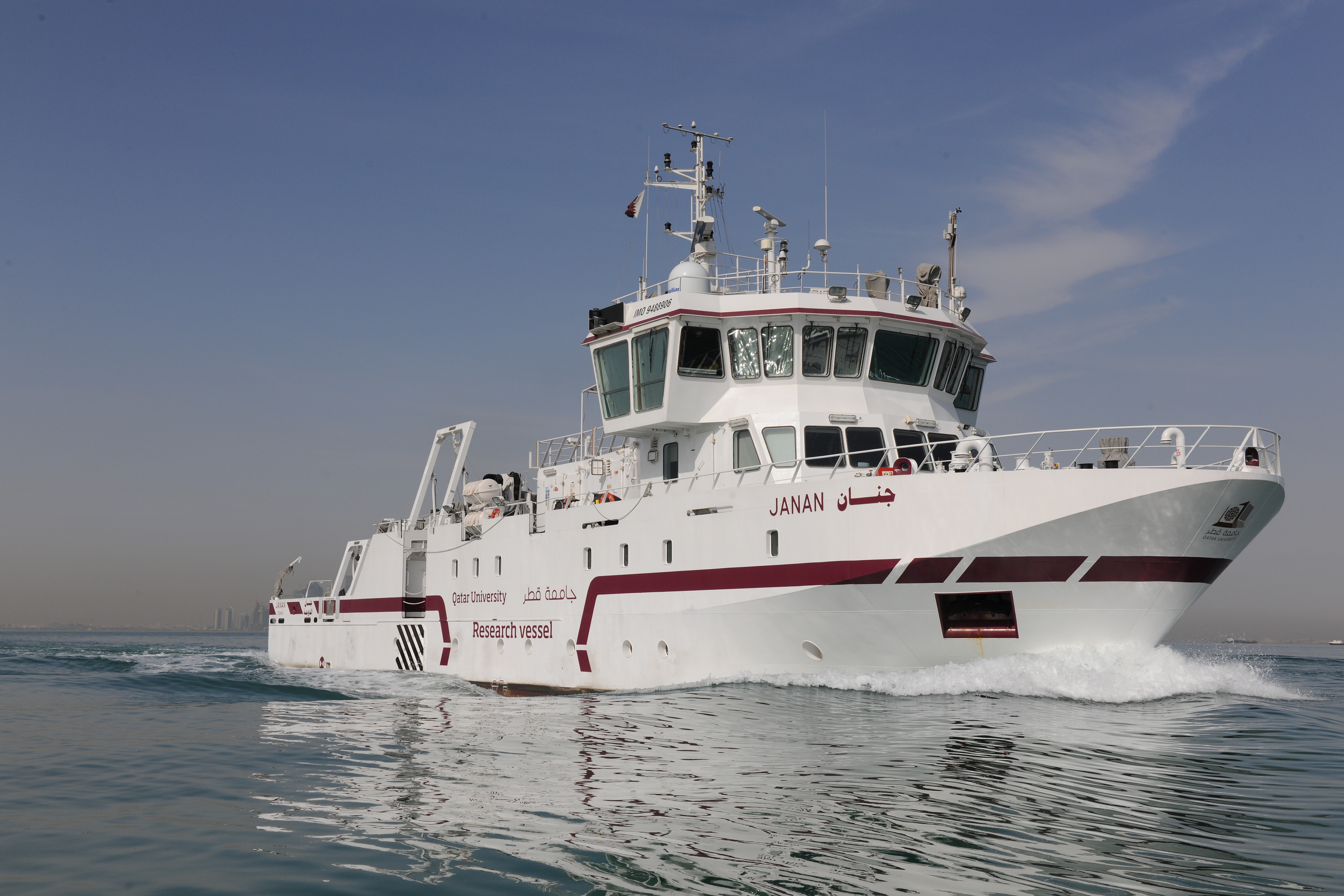
JANAN Research Vessel used by ESC since 2011 - Qatar University

ESC is the home of wide range of facilities. The most notable one is the mobile labs on board the JANAN Research Vessel.

JANAN is a 42.80 m. multipurpose Research Vessel and was named after the island located in the western coast of the Qatari peninsula. It was donated to Qatar University by H.H. Sheikh Tamim bin Hamad Al Thani the Amir of Qatar.

JANAN is used extensively in studying the state of marine environment in the Exclusive Economic Zone (EEZ) of the State of Qatar and to advance critical marine environmental studies and research in Qatar and the wider Gulf.

The center also has 12 labs equipped with state-of-arts instruments.

== See also ==
- Qatar University
- Qatar University Library
- Mariam Al Maadeed
- Center for Advanced Materials (CAM)
