= SESRI =

Research institute in Qatar

Social and Economic Survey Research Institute
- معهد البحوث الإجتماعية والإقتصادية المسحية
- Abbreviation: SESRI
- Formation: 2008
- Headquarters: Qatar University, Doha, Qatar
- Region served: Middle East
- Services: Research and Education
- Fields: Survey and Statistical data
- Official language: Arabic and English
- Website: http://www.qu.edu.qa/research/sesri

Social and Economic Survey Research Institute (SESRI) is a survey institute and social science research contributor that is part of Qatar University.

Qatar University realized the importance to enhance its social science research capacity with particular focus on monitoring the reality of national development and trends of its indicators based on evidence. Therefore, QU established SESRI in October 2008. To advance evidence-based decision-making and policy-making, SESRI established Policy Department in 2014.

Since its commencement, SESRI carried out more than 100 high-quality surveys on Qataris citizens, and also on the enormous expatriate residents of Qatar. Surveys were conducted to guide the public and the government, in line with the Qatar National Vision 2030. All surveys were performed in accordance with the highest scientific and ethical standards.

== SESRI Departments ==
SESRI has three departments:

1. Survey Operations Support Department
2. Research Department
3. Policy Department

== Accreditation ==
To ensure commitments to quality and to affirm compliance to international standards, SESRI successfully passed the requirements for ISO 9001:2015 Quality Management Standards from Bureau Veritas.

== Key Roles ==
- Provides consultancy services in survey research and socio-cultural development.
- Advances the evidence-based decision-making and policy-making.
- Capacity building for Qatari nationals in survey research methodology.
- Research topics of interest to Qatar (such as labor markets and migration, and female participation in the labor force).
- Provides reliable and up-to-date scientific data about the challenges and opportunities associated with Qataris between the age of 18 and 29.
- Implement survey projects on social and economic issues.
- Contributes to knowledge that is applied in character.
- Explore strategies and priorities for meeting the UN 2030 Sustainable Development Goals (SDGs) in Qatar.

== Preeminent Contributions ==
- Provides strategic analysis for policymakers in key issues such as family, gender relations, and demographic transitions in Qatar.
- Ongoing agricultural census to boost food security strategy in Qatar.
- ‘World Mental Health Qatar’s (WMHQ) study to enhance the understanding of the epidemiology of mental illness in Qatar.
- Assessing the extent of ‘Relative poverty’ among lower income Qatari Households.
- Conducted survey for National Human Rights Committee (NHRC) on Civil Society Organizations (CSOs) in Qatar to assist CSOs awareness of the significance of the NHRC.

== SESRI Policy Briefs ==
- Using Innovative Technology in the Management of Food Waste in Qatar.
- Greywater for Qatar's Water & Food Security.

== Links ==
- Qatar University
- Qatar University Library
- Mariam Al Maadeed
