= Suad Al-Kuwari =

- سعاد-الكواري
- Born: 1965; Doha
- Alma mater: Qatar University
- Occupation: Poet

Suad Al-Kuwari (born 1965) is a Qatari poet.

Suad Al-Kuwari was born in 1965 in Doha. She graduated from Qatar University.

She published a number of Arabic-language poetry collections and translations of her work into English have appeared in Language for a New Century: Contemporary Poetry from the Middle East, Asia, and Beyond (2008). She also collaborated on a number of musical works: My Testimony of You is Wounded with Emirati singer Adel Ibrahim and composer Ibrahim Al-Dosari and Ok and Pills (2023) with Tunisian singer Bushra Karim and Al-Dosari.

== Bibliography ==
- Tajaʻid (Wrinkles, poetry). Doha: n.p., 1995.
- Lam Takun Rouhi (poetry, 2000)
- Bab Jadeed li–Dukhoul (poetry, 2001)
- Bahtan ani al–Omr (poetry, 2001)
- Wareethat al–Sahraa (poetry, 2001)
- Malikat al–Jibal (poetry, 2004)
