= Biomedical Research Center =

Qatari research center

The Biomedical Research Center (BRC) is a research center at Qatar University focusing on biomedical research. BRC was founded in 2014, and partners with the Ministry of Public Health (Qatar), and Hamad Medical Corporation (HMC).

== History ==
The incidence of genetic disorders in Qatar is high, with the top three causes of death in the country being cancer, heart diseases, and diabetes. The government saw the creation of BRC as a strategy for proactively preventing diseases to help foster public health.

BRC labs received the ISO/IEC - 17025 accreditation from the American Association for Laboratory Accreditation (A2LA). This research center focus on infectious diseases (virology and microbiology), metabolic disorders, and biomedical omics.

== Research ==
Since its establishment in 2014, the BRC has published over 530 research papers. The centre's research projects encompass a range of areas, including:

1. Antibiotic profiling of antibiotic-resistant microbes in humans and animals.
2. Investigating variations in cases of type 2 diabetes.
3. Studying COVID-19, including the Omicron variant.
4. Conducting genetic sequencing of Qatari falcons, endangered animal species, and the dugong.
5. Exploring nanomedicine as a means of disease prevention.

== Zebrafish Research Model ==
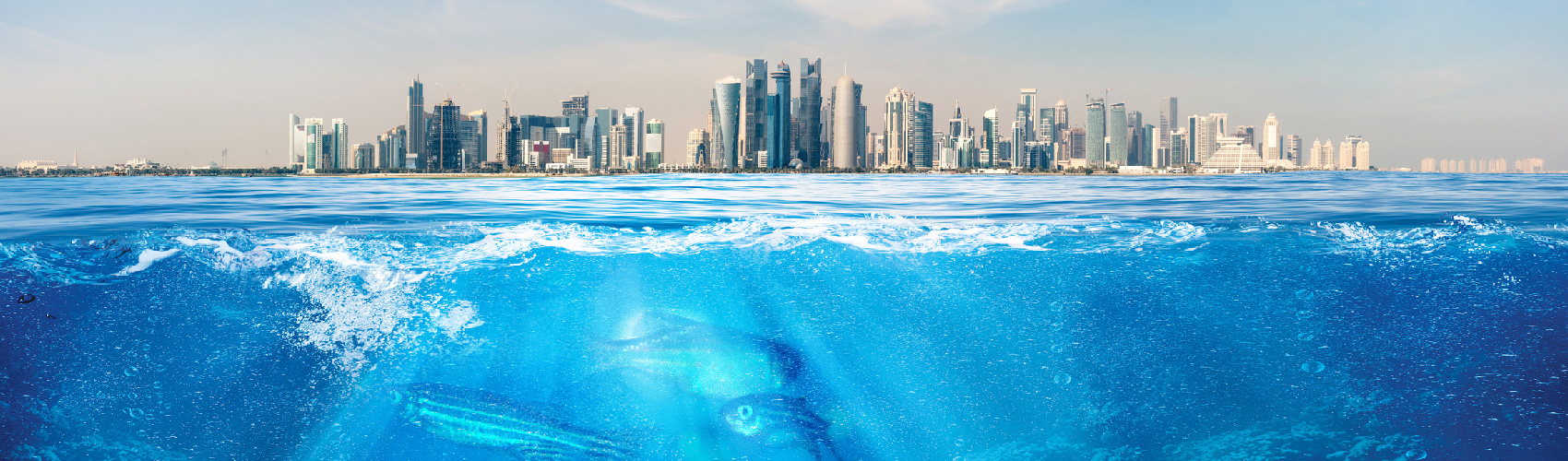
BRC Introduced the use of zebrafish as an animal model in biomedical research at Qatar University

BRC Introduced the use of zebrafish as an animal model in biomedical research and established a facility for it in 2015. The facility is used as a research unit to study many genetic diseases. The Ministry of Public Health articulated an institutional research policy (IRP) on the use of zebrafish in research, which Qatar University backed.

== Facilities ==
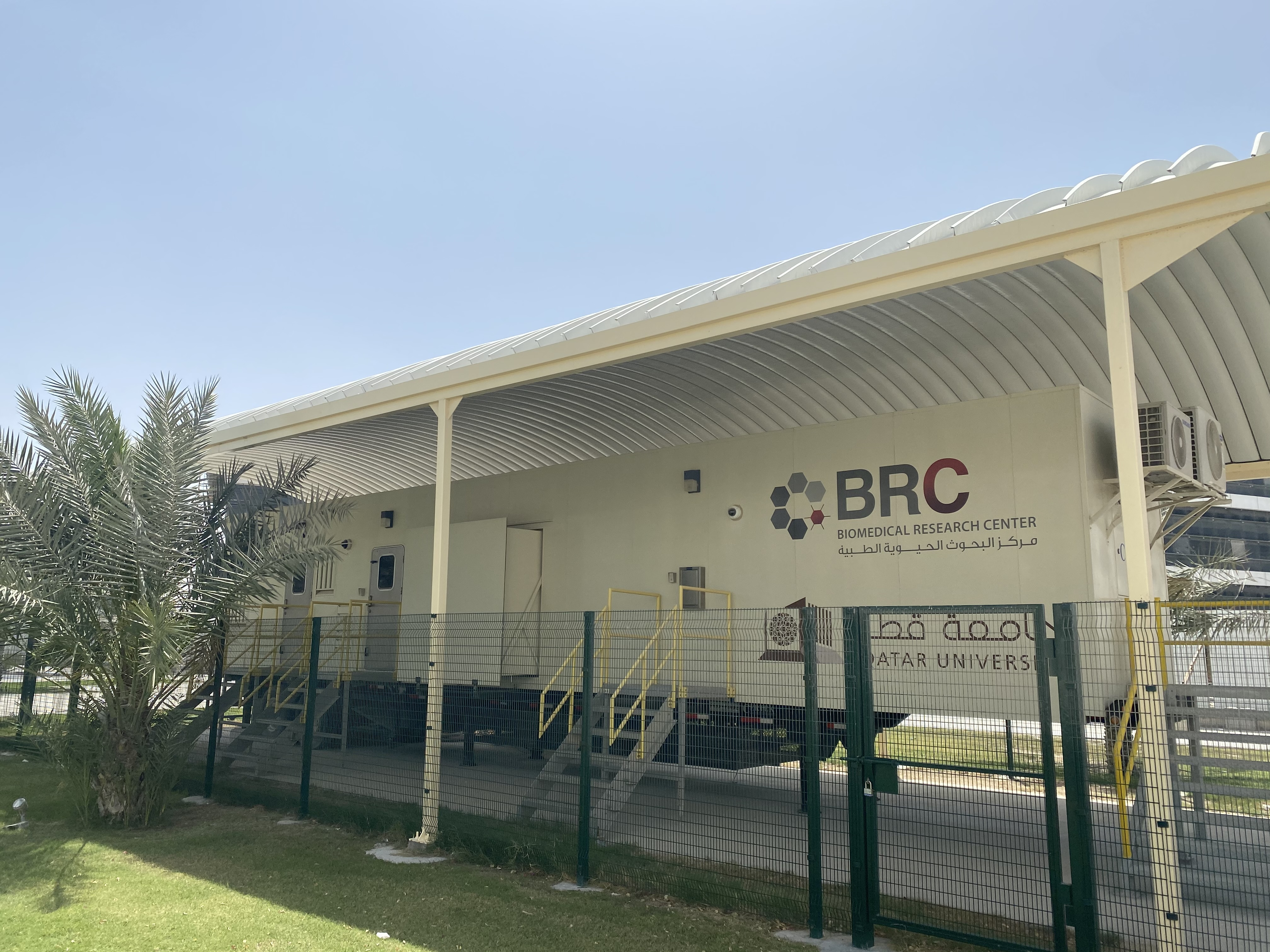
Biosafety level 3 (BSL3) lab at BRC, Qatar University

The BRC facilities include:

- Biosafety level 3 (BSL3) built by CERTEK, USA; for research on risk group 3 pathogens.
- Sequencing unit to conduct research in genomics.

== See also ==
- Mariam Al Maadeed
- Sidra Medical and Research Center
