= Gang Cao =

American physicist

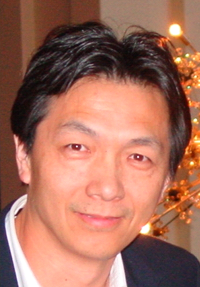
- Occupations: Condensed matter physicist, professor, author and researcher

Academic background
- Education: Ph.D., Physics
- Alma mater: Temple University

Gang Cao is an American condensed matter physicist, academic, author, and researcher. He is a professor of physics at the University of Colorado Boulder. and Director of Center for Experiments on Quantum Materials. Gang Cao served as the founding chair of the American Physical Society (APS) Topical Group on Quantum Materials Synthesis in 2023-2025.

Cao has published two books and more than 280 articles. His work has been cited more than 18,600 times, and his h-index is 73, according to Google Scholar. Cao's research interests focus on discovery and synthesis of 4d- and 5d-transition metal materials and study of physical properties of these materials as functions of temperature, magnetic field, pressure and electrical current. His most recent book entitled Physics of Spin-Orbit-Coupled Oxides reviews recent work in the field of 4d- and 5d-transition metal oxides, a field he helped initiate in the late 1990s.

Cao was an elected Fellow of the American Physical Society (DCMP) in 2009.

== Education ==
Cao received his Ph.D. in Physics under direction of Jack E. Crow at Temple University in Philadelphia in 1993.

== Career ==
Upon receiving his Ph.D. degree, Cao joined the National High Magnetic Field Laboratory (NHMFL) as a Postdoc (1993-1995), Assistant Scientist (1995-1998), and then Associate Scientist (1998-2002). He then relocated to the University of Kentucky as an Associate Professor of Physics in 2002. He was promoted to Professor in 2007 and became a Jack and Linda Gill Eminent Professor in 2011. He served as a founding Director of Center for Advanced Materials at Kentucky from 2008 to 2016. In 2015, he was awarded the Albert D. & Elizabeth H. Kirwan Memorial Prize for Outstanding Contributions to Original Research or Creative Scholarship. In 2016, he joined the faculty of University of Colorado at Boulder as a Professor of Physics. He is now Director of Center for Experiments on Quantum Materials at University of Colorado at Boulder.

== Research ==
Cao's research primarily focuses on discovery and synthesis of 4d- and 5d-transition metal materials and study of physical properties of these materials in single-crystal form as functions of temperature, magnetic field, pressure and electrical current, often at extreme conditions of high magnetic fields, high pressures and ultralow temperatures. In the early 1990s, he became interested in new materials, particularly those containing no 3d-transition metals, and started exploring ruthenates, rhodates, and iridates in search of novel materials and phenomena. This research effort has been intensified and extended over the last two decades. Cao is among very few who conducted pioneering studies of 4d- and 5d-transition metal oxides whose physics is dictated by a delicate interplay between the Coulomb and spin-orbit interactions.

== Bibliography ==
=== Books ===
- Frontiers of 4d- and 5d-transition Metal Oxides (2013), Gang Cao and Lance E. DeLong, ed. ISBN 9789814374866; World Scientific
- Physics of Spin-Orbit-Coupled Oxides (2021), Gang Cao and Lance E. DeLong, ISBN 9780199602025; Oxford University Press

=== Selected articles ===
- Cao, G., McCall, S., Crow, J. E., & Guertin, R. P. (1997). Observation of a metallic antiferromagnetic phase and metal to nonmetal transition in Ca 3 Ru 2 O 7. Physical Review Letters, 78(9), 1751.
- Cao, G., McCall, S., Shepard, M., Crow, J. E., & Guertin, R. P. (1997). Thermal, magnetic, and transport properties of single-crystal Sr 1− x Ca x RuO 3 (0<~ x<~ 1. 0). Physical Review B, 56(1), 321.
- Cao, G., McCall, S., Shepard, M., Crow, J. E., & Guertin, R. P. (1997). Magnetic and transport properties of single-crystal Ca 2 RuO 4: Relationship to superconducting Sr 2 RuO 4. Physical Review B, 56(6), R2916.
- Cao, G., Bolivar, J., McCall, S., Crow, J. E., & Guertin, R. P. (1998). Weak ferromagnetism, metal-to-nonmetal transition, and negative differential resistivity in single-crystal Sr 2 IrO 4. Physical Review B 57(18), R11039.
- Cao, G., Xin, Y., Alexander, C. S., Crow, J. E., Schlottmann, P., Crawford, M. K., ... & Marshall, W. (2002). Anomalous magnetic and transport behavior in the magnetic insulator Sr 3 Ir 2 O 7. Physical Review B, 66(21), 214412.
- Lin, X. N., Zhou, Z. X., Durairaj, V., Schlottmann, P., & Cao, G. (2005). Colossal Magnetoresistance by Avoiding a Ferromagnetic State in the Mott System Ca 3 Ru 2 O 7. Physical Review Letters, 95(1), 017203.
- Kim, B. J., Jin, H., Moon, S. J., Kim, J. Y., Park, B. G., Leem, C. S., ... & Rotenberg, E. (2008). Novel J eff= 1/2 Mott state induced by relativistic spin-orbit coupling in Sr2IrO4. Physical Review Letters, 101(7), 076402.
- Cao, G., Durairaj, V., Chikara, S., DeLong, L. E., & Schlottmann, P. (2008). Observation of strong spin valve effect in bulk Ca3(Ru1-xCrx)2O7. Physical review letters, 100(1), 016604. Observation of Strong Spin Valve Effect in Bulk ${\mathrm{Ca}}_{3}({\mathrm{Ru}}_{1\ensuremath{-}x}{\mathrm{Cr}}_{x}{)}_{2}{\mathrm{O}}_{7}$
- Qi, T. F., Korneta, O. B., Parkin, S., De Long, L. E., Schlottmann, P., & Cao, G. (2010). Negative volume thermal expansion via orbital and magnetic orders in Ca 2 Ru 1− x Cr x O 4 (0< x< 0.13). Physical Review Letters, 105(17), 177203.
- Ge, M., Qi, T. F., Korneta, O. B., De Long, D. E., Schlottmann, P., Crummett, W. P., & Cao, G. (2011). Lattice-driven magnetoresistivity and metal-insulator transition in single-layered iridates. Physical Review B, 84(10), 100402.
- Cao, G., Qi, T. F., Li, L., Terzic, J., Yuan, S. J., DeLong, L. E., ... & Kaul, R. K. (2014). Novel Magnetism of Ir 5+(5 d 4) Ions in the Double Perovskite Sr 2 YIrO 6. Physical Review Letters, 112(5), 056402.
- Cao, G., Terzic, J., Zhao, H. D., Zheng, H., De Long, L. E., & Riseborough, P. S. (2018). Electrical control of structural and physical properties via strong spin-orbit interactions in Sr 2 IrO 4. Physical Review Letters, 120(1), 017201.
- Cao, G., & Schlottmann, P. (2018). The challenge of spin–orbit-tuned ground states in iridates: a key issues review. Reports on Progress in Physics, 81(4), 042502.
- Zhao, H., Hu, B., Ye, F., Hoffmann, C., Kimchi, I., & Cao, G. (2019). Nonequilibrium orbital transitions via applied electrical current in calcium ruthenates. Physical Review B, 100(24), 241104.
- Cao, G., Zheng, H., Zhao, H., Ni, Y., Pocs, C. A., Zhang, Y., ... & Kimchi, I. (2020). Quantum liquid from strange frustration in the trimer magnet Ba 4 Ir 3 O 10. npj Quantum Materials, 5(1), 1–8.
- Ni, Y., Zhao, H., Zhang, Y., Hu, B., Kimchi, I., & Cao, G. (2021). Colossal magnetoresistance via avoiding fully polarized magnetization in the ferrimagnetic insulator Mn 3 Si 2 Te 6. Physical Review B, 103(16), L161105.
- Zhang, Y., Ni, Y., Zhao, H., Hakani, S., Ye, F., DeLong, L., Kimchi, I., and Cao, G.(2022), Control of chiral orbital currents in a colossal magnetoresistance material, Nature 611, 467–472, DOI: 10.1038/s41586-022-05262-3
