= Saad Ahmed Al Mohannadi =

Qatari engineer, president of Ashghal

HE Dr Eng Saad Ahmed Ibrahim Al Mohannadi سعد أحمد إبراهيم المهنّدي
- Born: 1974 (age 51–52); Doha
- Education: Electrical Engineering & MBA & PhD
- Alma mater: Qatar University
- Occupation: President of Ashghal
- Years active: 1998–present
- Employer: Public Works Authority 'Ashghal'
- Website: http://www.ashghal.gov.qa

Saad Ahmed Ibrahim Al Mohannadi (born in 1974 in Doha, Arabic: سعد أحمد إبراهيم المهنّدي), is currently the President of the Qatari public works authority Ashghal. Saad is fluent in English.

== Biography ==
Saad Al Mohannadi was appointed as the President of the Ashghal based on Emiri Decree No. 4 of 2017 as of January 4, 2017.

Saad began his engineering career after graduating from Qatar University in 1997 with a bachelor's degree in Electrical Engineering. He also received a master's degree from Qatar University in 2009. He received his doctorate in 2016 from France titled "Methods of Decision Making to Manage Mega Projects – a study for the Qatar Railways project".

Saad has worked for more than 19 years, during which he held several leadership and managerial positions in Qatar within the energy and transportation sector. He also held major roles such as Head of Control Center, Electrical Grid Planning Manager, Technical Affairs Manager at Qatar General Electricity and Water Corporation (Kahramaa). From 2011, Saad was the CEO of Qatar Railways Company, the company responsible for designing and developing the railway network in Qatar and then managing, operating and maintaining it once it is completed.

Saad has extensive experience in project management, planning and urban development, and added value to the performance of the institutions, which has earned him the membership of several prestigious regional and national committees.

== Awards ==
- 2013 Vision Project Award at the Global Infrastructure Leadership Forum in New York (pending reference check)
- 2015 Qatar's power list
- 2018 Leadership Excellence Award, Istanbul Technical University, TURKEY
- 2018 Distinguished Alumni Award, Qatar University, Achievements in Many Leadership and Management Roles in QATAR
