= Sheikha Abdulla al-Misnad =

Qatari academic

Sheikha Abdulla al-Misnad is a Qatari academic who has held numerous positions in teaching, administration, and research for over three decades. She served as president of Qatar University from 2003 to 2015 replaced by Hassan Rashid Al-Derham. Before assuming presidency, she served the university as Vice President for Research and Community Development (2000–2003), Head of the Department of Foundations of Education (1992–1995), and as a member of the University Council (1986–1989; 1998–2004).

== Private life ==
She is an aunt of Sheikha Moza bint Nasser al-Misnad, chairperson and co-founder of Qatar Foundation and mother of Emir Tamim bin Hamad Al Thani.

== Education ==
Al-Misnad received her undergraduate training at Qatar University, where she attained a Bachelor of Education in 1977, and subsequently a postgraduate diploma in Education in 1978. She went on to enroll in doctoral studies at Durham University in the United Kingdom, where she was awarded the title of Doctor of Philosophy in Education in 1984.

== Career ==
=== Research ===
During her graduate studies at Durham University, al-Misnad was active in research related to education in the Persian Gulf region, particularly education pertaining to women. Her thesis on "The Development of Modern Education in the Gulf States with Special Reference to Women's Education" was published by London-based Ithaca Press in 1985.

She has authored more than 50 articles published in various specialist journals during the span of her career.

=== Local activities ===
Al-Misnad has been at the forefront of Qatar's educational reform movement since the past decade. In 2003, she was enlisted to head a reform project to develop Qatar University into one of the leading higher education institutes in the region. Aside from Qatar University, she has also been involved in implementing reforms to the country's primary, secondary and private education system.

A member of Qatar Foundation's board of directors since 1999, she has played a significant role in the governance of several of the educational institutes which constitute Education City, most notably of Qatar Academy and The Learning Center. She is a former member of the Board of Governors of both institutes.

Al-Misnad is regarded as one of the most active members of the Supreme Education Council's project to develop a modern education system in which the independent schools are privately operated but publicly financed.

=== International activities ===
Al-Misnad is a member of numerous international bodies and delegations. She was an active member of the Steering Committee of the Symposium at the UNESCO World Conference on Higher Education Applicability to the Arab States of the Persian Gulf, which was held in Doha from December 5 to December 7, 1999.

She has been a member of the United Nations University Council (UNU) since June 2004. Her distinguished career in education has gained her a wide and esteemed reputation not only in Qatar, but also in the broader region and in international arenas. In January 2008, she was awarded an honorary doctorate in Civil Law by Durham University in acknowledgement of her achievements in education.

=== Presidency of Qatar University ===
She was appointed president of Qatar University in 2003. In June 2015, she was replaced by Hassan Rashid Al-Derham.

=== Government ===
She was conferred the rank of Minister by the Qatari government in 2010.

== Controversy ==
In a speech to Dalhousie University in 2013, al-Misnad expressed how she had to ask one thousand Qatari students to leave the university within the first year of taking up her position as a president of Qatar University. The statement generated controversy and public outrage among the Qatari community.
