= Soliman Abdel-hady Soliman =

Egyptian engineer

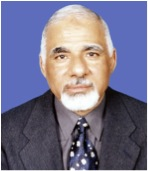

Dr. Soliman Abdel-hady Soliman was an Egyptian professor of electrical engineering focusing on power and machines sector. Since 1997, he has been Professor of Electric Power System Analysis, Electrical Power & Machines Department, at Ain Shams University in Cairo, Egypt,

== Biography ==
He received a Bachelor of Science in electrical engineering, power and machines in 1973 and a Master of Science in the same field in 1977, both from Ain Shams University. Abdel-hady's PhD came from the University of Alberta, in 1986.

=== Related work experience ===
Abdel-hady Soliman has held a number of teaching positions in the Electrical Engineering Departments of a variety of universities throughout his career:

- Demonstrator, Ain Shams University, 1973–1977
- Assistant Lecturer, Ain Shams University, 1977–1983
- Teaching Assistant, University of Alberta, 1984–1986
- Assistant Professor, Ain Shams University, 1986–1991
- Assistant Professor, College of Technological Studies, Kuwait, 1992–1996
- Visiting Professor, University of Alberta, Canada, summers, 1986 to 1991
- Associate Professor, Ain Shams University, 1991–1996
- Professor of Electric Power System Analysis, Electrical Power & Machines Department, Ain Shams University Cairo, Egypt, Jan.1997 to present.
- Visiting Professor, Dalhousie University, Nova-Scotia, summers 1998, 1999, 2000 and 2001.
- Chairman of Electrical Engineering Department, University of Qatar, February 2004 to fall 2005. Prior to his tenure and then while at the university, he also served as the editor in chief of its Engineering Journal from 2002 to 2005
- Visiting Professor, Sultan Qaboos University, Musket, Oman, Fall 2006.

Since 2007 he has also served as the vice dean for student affairs and chairman of the Electrical Power Engineering Department at Misr University for Science and Technology.

== Publications ==
Abdel-hady Soliman's publications have included both books he co-authored as well as books that he co-translated into Arabic. A selection of his publications are as follows:

=== Books ===
- G.S. Christensen, M. E. El-Hawarry and S. A. Soliman, Optimal Control Applications in Electric Power Systems Plenum Press, New York, NY, 1987. ISBN 0-306-42517-3
- G.S. Christensen, and S.A.Soliman, Optimal Long-Term Operation of Electric Power Systems Plenum Press, New York, NY, 1988. ISBN 0-306-42875-X
- G .S. Christensen, and S.A.Soliman,Optimal Control of Distributed Nuclear Reactors, Plenum Press, New York, NY, 1989. ISBN 0-306-43305-2.
- S. A. Soliman, and A. M. Al-Kandai, Electrical load forecasting: Modeling and model construction ISBN 978-0-12-381543-9 Elsevier; A. Butterworth-Heinemann, 2010.
- S.A. Soliman and A.H. Mantawy, Modern Optimization Techniques Applications in Electric Power Systems in press, Springer Publisher, ISBN 978-953-307-335-4 January 2012

=== Translations ===
- Power Systems, (Behic R. Gungor) Translated into Arabic by S.A.Soliman, A.M Al- Kandari and M. El-Mazeddi, Published by Kuwait University,. 1996.
- Control Systems, (C.D.Dorf and R.Beshop) 7th edition. Translated into Arabic by S.A.Soliman and A.M.Al-Kandari, Kuwait University.
- Electronic Instruments and Measurements, by L.D.Jones and A.Foster Chin. Translated into Arabic by S.A.Soliman, A.M.Al-Kandari and S.A.Embabbie, Published by Public Authority of Applied Education and Training (PAAET), 1996.
