= Presidential Classroom =

The Presidential Classroom was a high school program in which students spent a week in Washington, D.C., at the Georgetown Marriott Conference Center at Georgetown University. Founded in 1969, each one-week visit saw students tour different sites in DC, including the State Department, the Capitol, the Supreme Court, Mount Vernon, Washington Monument, Jefferson Memorial, World War II Memorial, and various advocacy organizations, such as the RNC, DNC, and ACLU.

Students heard from leading political officials and insiders about the Constitution and the current political scene, with a focus on international politics and negotiations. The participants were very international, as the programme attracted many exchange students which spent a year at a US high school. While more than half of the participants were non-US citizens, students from the US still were the largest group from a single country. The international students often visit embassies and meet personally with the ambassadors.

In 2012 Presidential Classroom teamed up with the Miller Center to provide an online format. It appears that it no longer has a residency format at Georgetown.
