= Ibrahim bin Yousuf Al-Fakhro =

Qatari writer, businessman and art collector

Ibrahim Yousuf Al-Fakhro
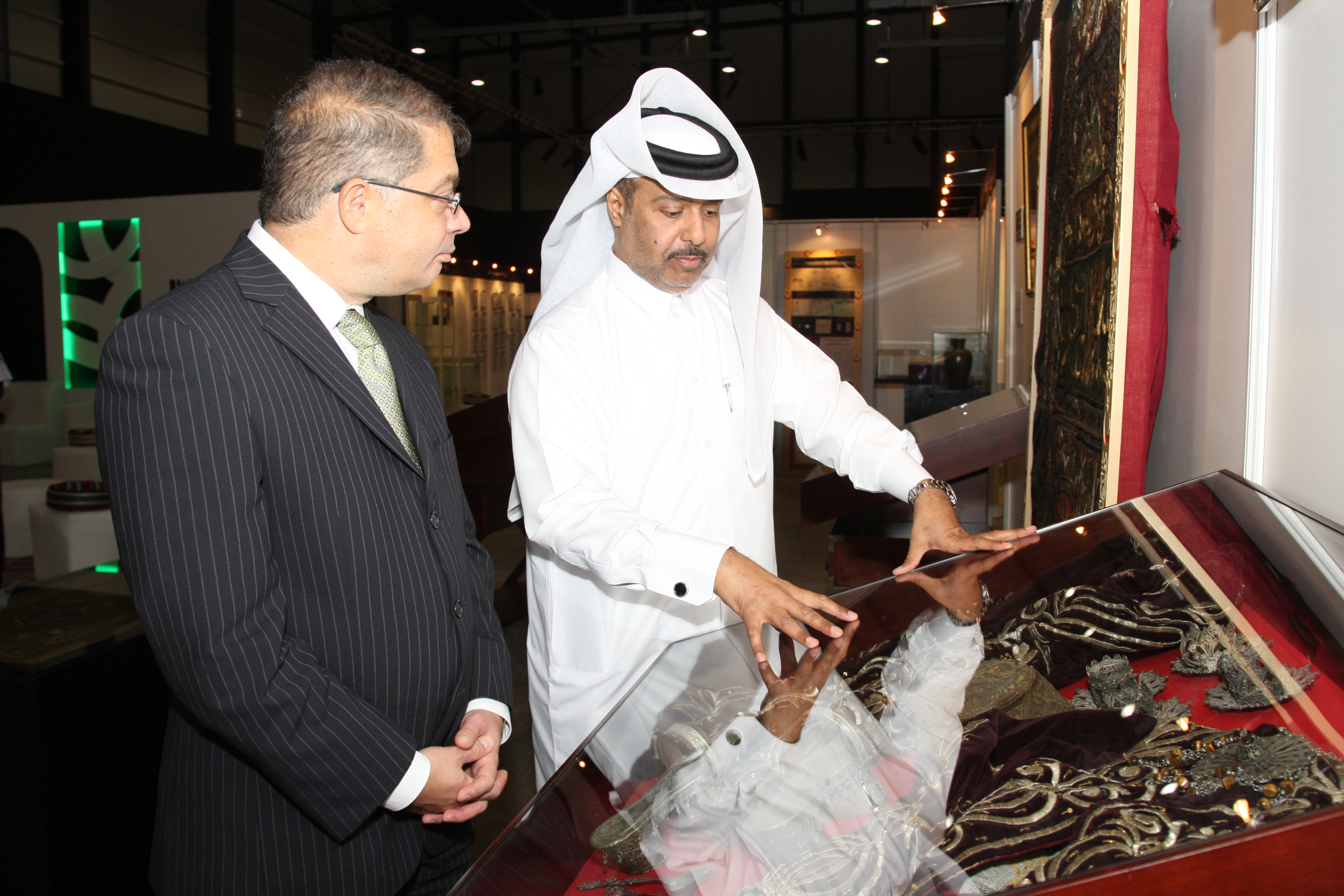
- Born: 1 January 1963 (age 63); Doha, Qatar
- Education: Qatar University
- Title: Eng.

Ibrahim Bin Yousuf Al Hasan Al Fakhro (Arabic: م. إبراهيم بن يوسف آل حسن الفخرو) is a Qatari writer, businessman and art collector. He authored a book entitled “Arabic Calligraphy and Quran, A shared journey” in 2015. He also held several exhibitions regarding Arabic calligraphy, Islamic art, and the life of Muhammad. He is currently vice-chairman of the Middle East Facility Management Association.

== Education ==
Al Fakhro received a bachelor's degree in electrical engineering from Qatar University in 1986, and later completed a diploma in management in 1991.

== Career ==
Al Fakhro started his career path in 2002 as the Distribution Manager at Kahramaa, which was founded in 2000 to regulate the supply of electricity and water to consumers and to secure the country's electricity and water needs.

Al Fakhro later worked as a Senior Manager at Qatar Tourism Authority, a governmental authority concerning the tourism sector in Qatar, for two years.

He was appointed as Director General of Qatar's Chamber of Commerce in 2004, where he played a prominent role in improving the rules and regulations regarding commerce, industry, and trade.

Al Fakhro was appointed as CEO for Barwa Al-Baraha and sister companies within Barwa Real Estate Company. During his time, the company scored many achievements, and earned three international real estate awards. In 2011, Barwa's assets reached 65 billion Qatari riyals.

== Art collection ==
Al Fakhro's collection consists of calligraphic work and historical copies of the Quran. He also possesses a collection of Ottoman antiques as well as antiques from Mecca and some pertaining to the Kaaba. He held several exhibitions in this regard, some of which are:

=== Mal Lawal Exhibition ===
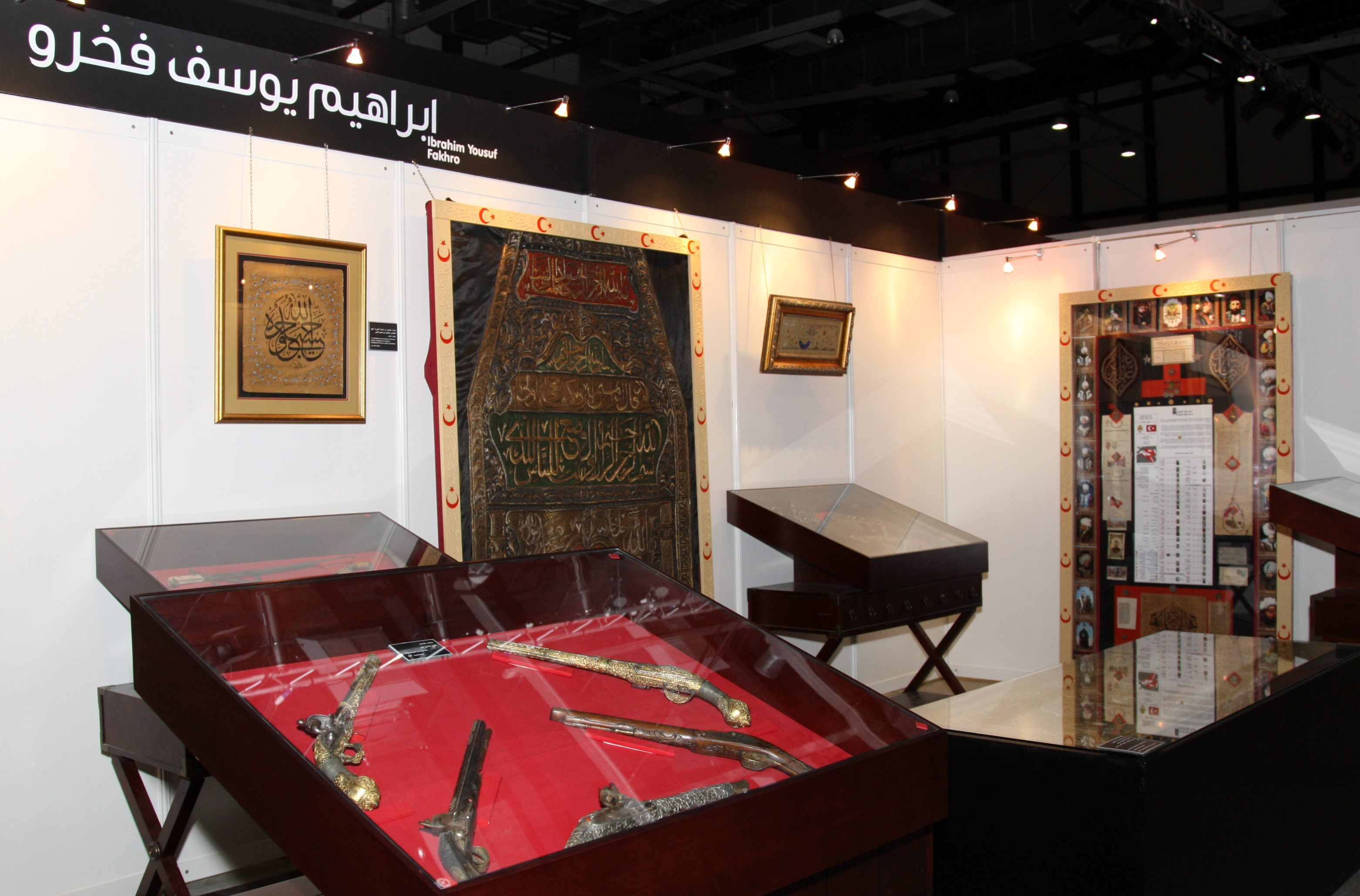
Al Fakhro's display in Mal Lawal exhibition

Al Fakhro participated in Mal Lawal Exhibition, held at al-Riwaq Exhibition Hall near the Museum of Islamic Art in Qatar, and was awarded second place. Al Fakhro's collection included antiques and valuable pieces that portray the life during the Ottoman era. The exhibits vividly represented the different stages of the Ottoman history as well as the people's lifestyle in that era.

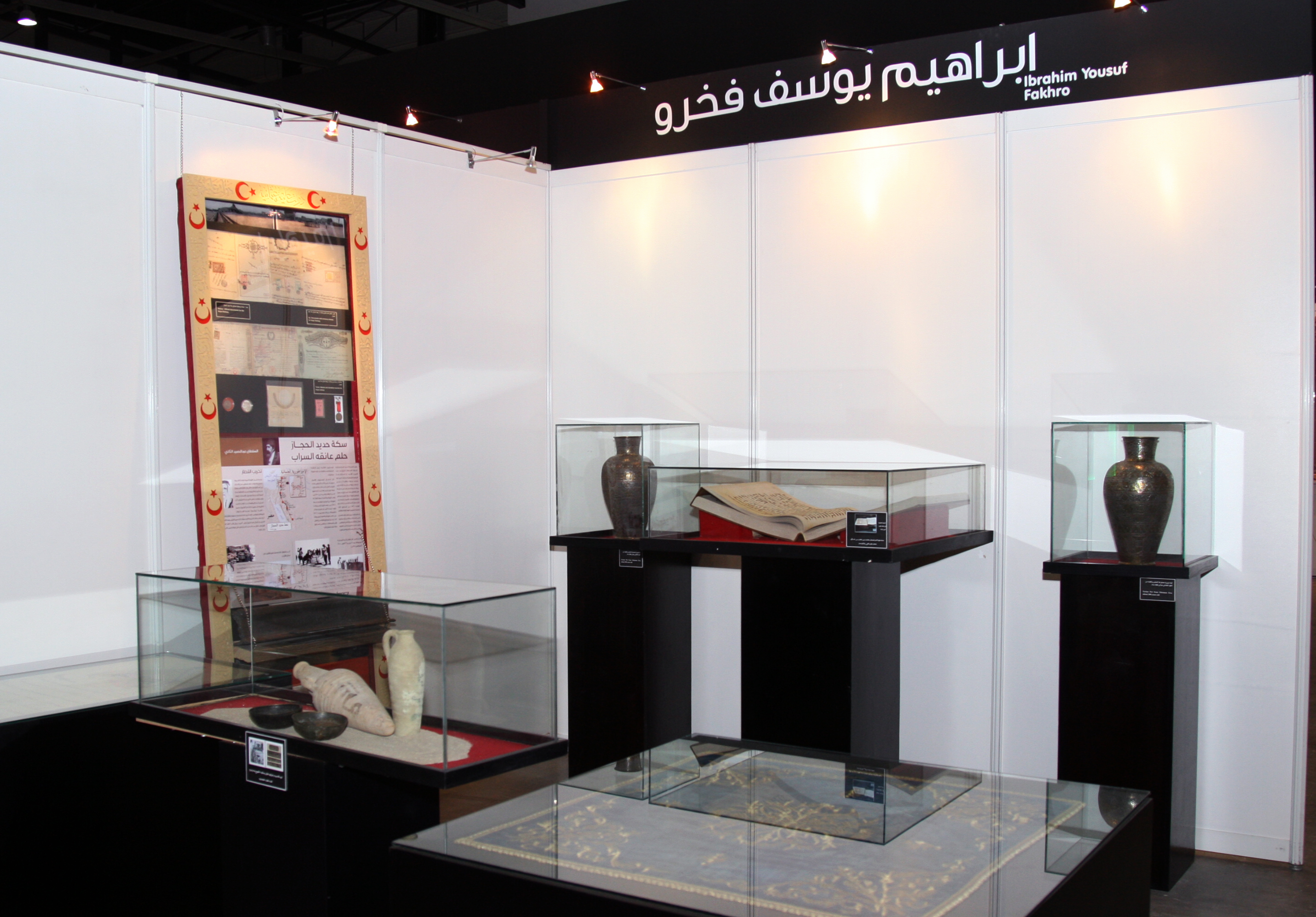
Al Fakhro's display in Mal Lawal exhibition

=== "The Arabic Calligraphy and Qur'an, a Shared Journey" Exhibition ===
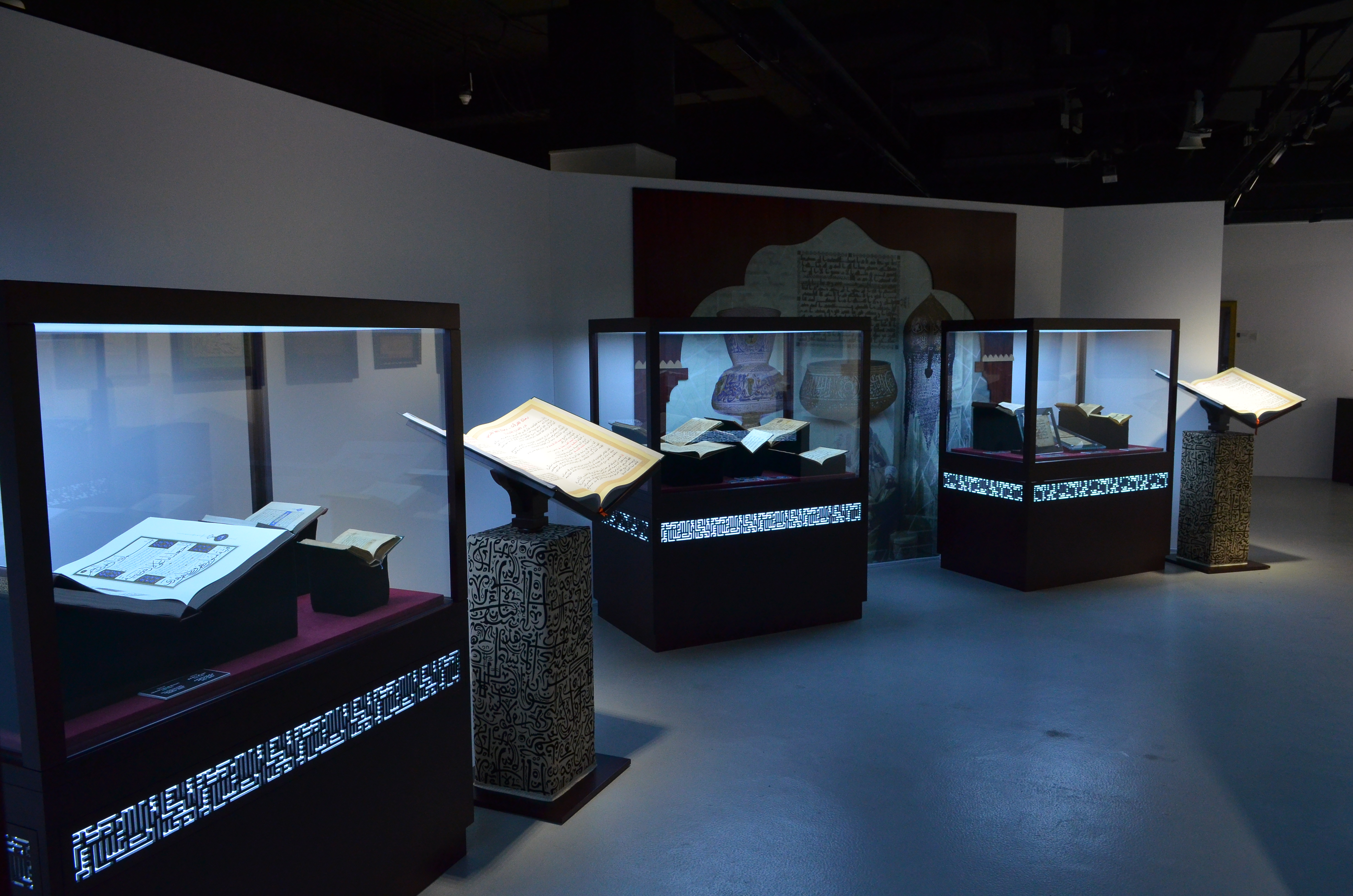
"The Arabic Calligraphy and Qur'an, a Shared Journey" Exhibition

The Arabic Calligraphy and Qur'an, a Shared Journey Exhibition, assembled by Engineer Ibrahim Al Fakhro, featured around 80 copies of the Quran from various eras, in addition to 30 artworks by renowned international calligraphers. Also in display was a collection of valuable pieces of art pertaining to Arabic calligraphy and the Qur'an as well as several original and copied manuscripts.

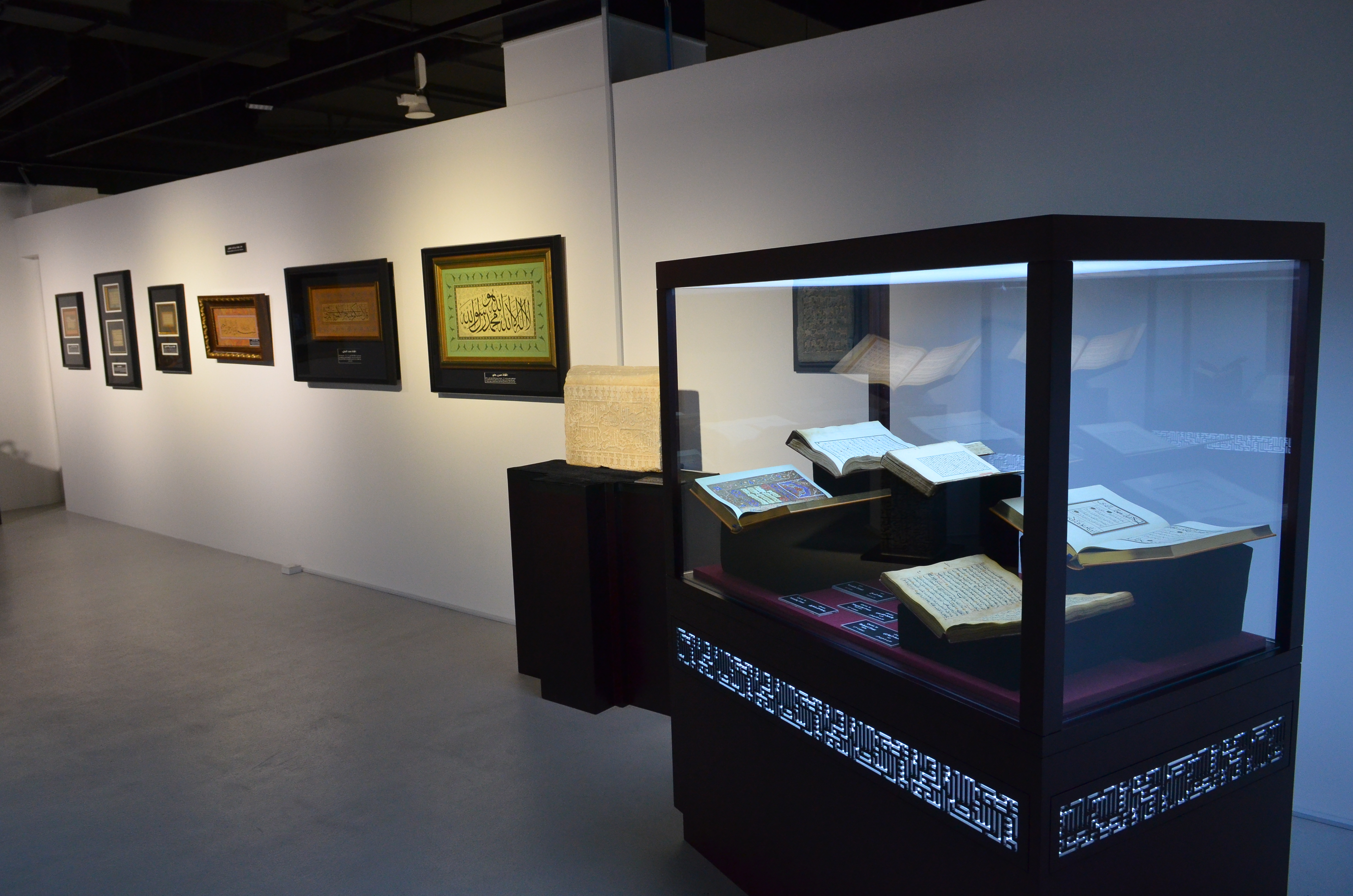
"The Arabic Calligraphy and Qur'an, a Shared Journey" Exhibition

During the exhibition hosted by the Katara Cultural Village in Ramadan 1434 A.H.(2013 A.D.), Al Fakhro took the opportunity to explain the strong association between the evolution of Arabic calligraphy and the spread of the Quran. The exhibition showcased copies of the Qur'an that were several hundred years old. The exhibition started with displaying the birth of Arabic calligraphy, followed by the appearance of innovative scripts, the addition of artistic finishes and gilding, and finally, printing. The exhibition ended with Mushaf Qatar and a few of the most beautiful printed copies of the Qur'an. Al Fakhro indicated that through his exhibition Arabic Calligraphy and Qur'an, a Shared Journey, he was keen to showcase a diversity of concepts represented by each and every displayed piece. He said that he wanted to tell the visitors different stories through these pieces.

=== The Arabic Script Exhibition ===
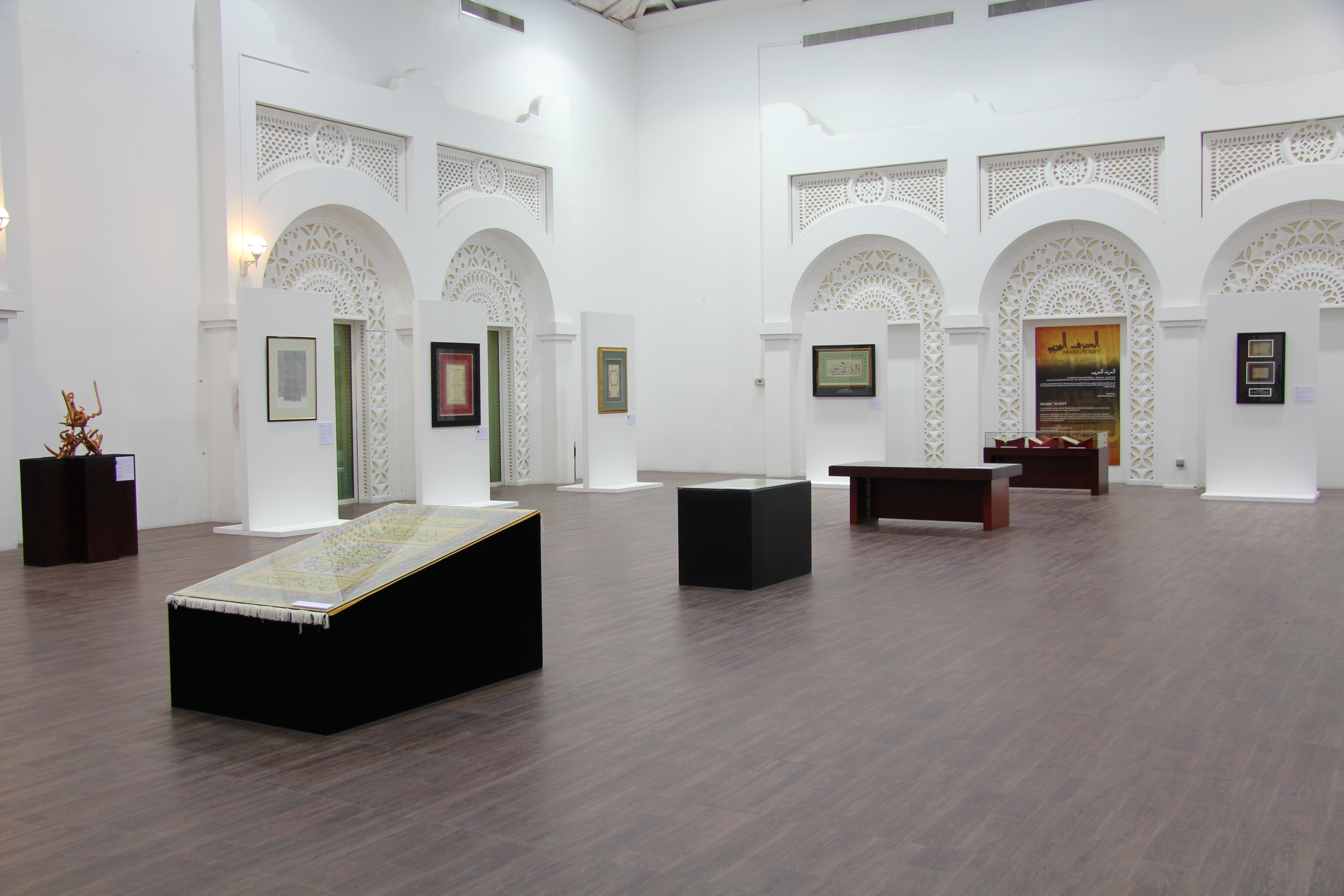
The Arabic Script Exhibition

This exhibition was held at Qatar Foundation convention center in September 2014. It included a rare assortment of artistic masterpieces from Engineer Ibrahim Al Fakhro's personal collection that portray the beauty of Arabic script. The exhibition was staged in three main categories: the start of Arabic calligraphy, the evolution stage, and the modern stage. The exhibition shed the light on the diverse uses of the Arabic script, ranging from manuscripts and textiles to ceramics and coins. In display were coins dated back to the ninth and tenth centuries, including some that featured the works of prominent calligraphers such as Sheikh Hamdullah al-Amasi and Hâfiz Osman.

== Books ==
=== Arabic Calligraphy and Qur'an, a Shared Journey ===
This book was published in 2015, followed up by the passionate art collector Ibrahim Al-Fakhro after his personal exhibition in Katara. It mainly outlines the history of Arabic Calligraphy through the personal view of the author. The objects and artworks exhibited in the book are part of his private collection, mostly composed of original Qurans, along with some facsimile Qurans that he has collected. Ibrahim Al-Fakhroo has researched his collection for proof and examples on how the development and improvement of Arabic Calligraphy are intrinsically connected with the publishing and diffusion of Quran, throughout history.

=== Calligraphy in Qatar ===
This book presents a selection of modern models that highlight the state's keenness to promote the movement of artistic creativity in general and Arabic calligraphy in particular, starting with a display of the calligraphic collection in the Museum of Islamic Art, and followed by showing examples of Arabic calligraphy at several spots in Qatar Foundation, Hamad International Airport, and the Sheikh Faisal Bin Qassem Museum, in addition to a further selection of calligraphic arts in various public locations in Qatar.
