= Mansour Mohamed al-Muslah =

Qatari businessman

Mansour Mohamed al-Muslah is a Qatari businessman.

== Career ==
Al-Muslah holds a Bachelor's degree in social science from Qatar University.

Al-Muslah held various positions within Qatar's Ministries of Interior and Defense during his early career, including serving as director of Sheikh Abdullah bin Khaled al-Thani’s personnel office at the Ministry of Interior. He has served as chairman of Aqar Real Estate Investment and Development and on the boards of directors of Qatar Islamic Bank (QIB) and Al Jazeera Finance Company.

Al-Muslah has served as a non-independent, non-executive director of QIB since 1996. In 2014, he was reappointed during the bank's general assembly meeting. He previously served as a board member of Tadhamon International Islamic Bank.
