= Nourah Al Saad =

Qatari writer and academic

- Native name: نورة آل سعد
- Born: 1964 (age 61–62) Doha, Qatar
- Education: Qatar University (B.A., 1985); University of Jordan (M.A., 1992)

Nourah Al Saad (born 1964, Doha) is a Qatari writer and academic.

== Biography ==
Nourah Al Saad received a Bachelor of Education from the Department of Arabic Language at Qatar University in 1985 and then a Master of Arts in the Department of Arabic Language from the University of Jordan in 1992.

Her articles have appeared in Al Raya newspaper.

=== Writing ===
Al Saad has published work since the 1980s, and began publishing short stories in newspapers. She compiled seven of these short stores for her first collection, The Newspaper Seller, which was published in 1989.

In 2005, Al Saad published two books of literary criticism: Voices of Silence: Essays on the Qatari Story and Narrative, an analysis of Qatari writers, and Abdul Rahman Munif's Experience in Salt Cities, which analyzed the Syrian writer Abdul Rahman Munif.

Al Saad's 2010 novel, al-Aridah, follows a family from Doha through Qatar's political changes in the 20th century.

== Works ==
- Wa tawāṣaw bi-al-ḥaqq [And seek the truth]. 2003. OCLC 642721088. (collection of articles)
- al-ʻArīḍah [The Petition]. 2010. OCLC 689543588. (novel)

=== Literary criticism ===
- أصوات الصمت – مقالات في القصصة والرواية القطرية [Voices of Silence: Essays on the Qatari Story and Narrative]. 2005.
- Tajrībīyat ʻAbd al-Raḥmān Munīf fī Mudun al-milḥ [Abdul Rahman Munif's Experience in Salt Cities]. National Council for Culture, Arts and Heritage in Qatar. 2005. OCLC 69983853. (Critical study)
- Al Saad, Nourah (2007). Al-šams fī aṯarī : maqālāt fī al-šiʿr wa-al-naqd [The Sun in My Archeology: Essays on Poetry and Criticism]. Arab Foundation for Studies. OCLC 1117763314.

=== Short story collections ===
- Ba'i' al-jara'id [The Newspaper Seller]. 1989.
- Bārānūyā [Paranoia]. 2013. OCLC 847369829.
