= Qatar Islamic Bank =

Islamic financial institution in Qatar

Qatar Islamic Bank (Q.P.S.C)
- Company type: Public Company
- Traded as: QE: QIBK
- Industry: Banking
- Founded: 1982
- Headquarters: Doha, Qatar
- Number of locations: Qatar, Sudan, UK, Lebanon
- Key people: Bassel Gamal (Group CEO); Sheikh Jassim bin Hamad bin Jassim bin Jaber Al Thani (Chairman)
- Revenue: 1.70 billion
- Number of employees: 501–1000 employees
- Website: www.qib.com.qa

Qatar Islamic Bank (Q.P.S.C.) was established in 1982 as the first Islamic financial institution in Qatar. Its products and operations are supervised by a Shari’a board, which ensures that the bank adheres to Islamic banking and finance principles. It is the country's largest Shari’a-compliant lender.

As of 2019 QIB was the largest Islamic bank in Qatar, with a 43% share of the Islamic sector and an 11% share of the banking market overall. It has over 170,000 retail clients and more than 3,000 corporate clients. It conducts its domestic business through 31 branches spread throughout the country, in addition to private centers for ladies and dedicated lounges for affluent customers, augmented by more than 175 multi-function ATM installations.

== History and acquisitions ==
In 1982 QIB was established with a paid-up capital of QR 25 million. It opened its first branch for customers in July 1983.

In 1989 Al Jazeera Finance was established, with 30% ownership by QIB. By 1996, QIB's paid-up capital had increased to QR 200 million, and in 1998, it was listed on the Qatar Stock Exchange. 2000 saw the establishment of Aqar, 49% owned by QIB. Arab Finance House, 37% owned by QIB, was established in Beirut in 2003. By 2005, the number of QIB's branches stood at eight, and its paid-up capital had increased to QR 663 million.

2005 also saw the establishment of Asian Finance Bank (41.67% owned by QIB), and the following year QIB's paid-up capital increased to QR 1.19 billion.

QInvest was established in 2007 (50.13% owned by QIB), QIB-UK was set up in 2008 (a wholly owned subsidiary), and in 2009, BEEMA was established, with 25% owned by QIB.

In February 2018 QIB sold its full 60% stake in the Asian Finance Bank (AFB) to Malaysian Building Society Bhd (MBSB).

In March 2019 QIB successfully priced a US$750 million 5-year Sukuk at par with a profit rate of 3.982% (equivalent to a credit spread of 150bps over US$ Mid-Swaps). The Sukuk was met with strong investor demand, as evidenced by the large orderbook, which closed at US$3.1 billion, representing an oversubscription rate of 4.1 times. In terms of geography, 46% of the Sukuk was allocated to Asian investors, followed by Middle Eastern accounts (23%), Europe (21%), and US/Other (10%). In total, non-Middle Eastern investors were allocated 77% of the Sukuk, which is a remarkable outcome and one of the highest international allocations achieved by any bank from the region. 60% of the investors were fund managers, 26% were banks and private banks, and 14% were insurance companies and agencies. More than 140 investors from 28 countries spanning Europe, Asia, the USA, and the Middle East participated in the Sukuk.

In 2019 the Bank achieved a net profit of QAR 3,055.4 Million, representing a growth of 10.9% for the same period in 2018. The total assets of the Bank have increased by 6.7% compared to December 2018 and now stand at QAR 163.5 Billion. Financing activities have reached QAR 113.8 Billion and have grown by 11.3% compared to December 2018. Customer Deposits at the Bank now stand at QAR 111.6 billion, registering a strong growth of 11% compared to December 2018. Total Income for the year ended 31 December 2019 amounted to QAR 7,738.2 Million, registering 12.4% growth compared to 2018, reflecting a healthy growth in the Bank's core operating activities.

In November 2019 Fitch Ratings affirmed Qatar Islamic Bank at 'A' with a Stable outlook. Also, in December 2019, Moody's Investors Service ("Moody's") affirmed the Long-term deposit ratings of QIB at "A1" with a Stable outlook. In May 2019, Capital Intelligence Ratings (CI) affirmed the bank's Long-term Currency Rating (LTCR) of ‘A+’ with a Stable outlook. In March 2019, Standard & Poor's (S&P) affirmed the bank's credit rating at ‘A−’ with a Stable outlook.

QIB was ranked 15th on Forbes Middle East's 30 Most Valuable Banks 2025 list. It also ranked 32nd on Forbes Middle East's Top 100 Listed Companies 2025 list.

== Major share holders ==
The Qatar Investment Authority (QIA) is the single largest shareholder of QIB. The balance of QIB's shareholders comprises other Qatari individuals, families, and institutions, and QIB's shares are listed on the Qatar Exchange.

== Board of directors ==
QIB is overseen by the following directors:

- Mr. Abdullatif Bin Abdulla Al Mahmoud (Vice-Chairman)
- Mr. Mohamed Bin Issa Al Mohanadi
- Mr. Abdulla Bin Saeed Al Eidah
- Mr. Nasser Rashid S. Al-Kaabi
- Mr. Mansour Mohamed al-Muslah
- Sheikh Ali Bin Ghanim Bin Ali Al Thani
- Sheikh Abdulla Bin Khaled Bin Thani Al Thani
- Mr. Abdul Rahman Abdulla Abdul Ghani
