= Ashghal =

Public Works Authority of Qatar

Public Works Authority 'Ashghal' هيئة الأشغال العامة
- Company type: Government
- Industry: Construction, infrastructure
- Founded: 2004
- Headquarters: Al Faisal Tower, Al Dafna, Doha
- Key people: Mohammed bin Abdulaziz Al-Meer (President)
- Number of employees: 30,000 (27,000 construction workers)
- Website: www.ashghal.gov.qa

Ashghal (Arabic: هيئة الأشغال العامة) is the Public Works Authority of Qatar headquartered in Al Dafna, Doha. Ashghal was established based on the Emiri Decree issued by the Emir Sheikh Hamad bin Khalifa Al Thani on 20 January 2004, as an autonomous body to design, deliver and manage all infrastructure-related projects as well as public amenities of the state. Ashghal is responsible for the construction and maintenance of local roads, drainage systems, highways and public buildings like mosques, schools, hospital, health centers, parks, etc.

== Organizational structure ==
The current president of Ashghal is Saad Ahmed Al Mohannadi.

Ashghal's business units consist of five major affairs:

- Infrastructure Affairs
- Asset Affairs
- Buildings Affairs
- Technical Support Affairs
- Shared Services Affairs

== Programmes ==
Ashghal currently has the following key programmes:

- The Expressway Programme
- The Local Roads & Drainage Programme

== Responsibilities ==
Ashghal was responsible for building infrastructure facilities for the 2022 FIFA World Cup hosted by Qatar. The country had planned to spend up to $100 billion in infrastructure projects between 2013 and 2022. Various companies like CH2M Hill, KBR, and Parsons Brinckerhoff are associated with many of Ashghal's projects.
