= Qatar University =

Public research university in Qatar

- جامعة قطر
- Former name: University of Qatar
- Type: Public
- Established: 1973; 53 years ago
- Affiliations: Union of Arab Universities; League of Islamic Universities; International Association of Universities
- President: Dr. Omar AlAnsari
- Faculty: 961
- Undergraduates: 23,929
- Location: Doha, Qatar; 25°22′30″N 51°29′20″E
- Campus: Urban 2,000 acres (8.1 km^{2})
- Language: Arabic and English
- Publications: Campus Life (English); Campus Today (Arabic)
- Website: qu.edu.qa

Qatar University (Arabic: جامعة قطر; transliterated: Jami'at Qatar) is a public research university located on the northern outskirts of Doha, Qatar. It is the only public university in the country. The university hosts twelve colleges – Arts and Sciences, Business and Economics, Education, Engineering, Law, Sharia and Islamic Studies, Pharmacy, College of Health Science, College of Medicine, College of Dental Medicine, College of Pharmacy, College of nursing, and College of Sport Science.

Courses are taught in Arabic and English. Students entering the University are sometimes placed in a “Foundation Program”, which ensures the acquirement of skills such as Math and English.

Many of its academic departments have received or are currently under evaluation for accreditation from a number of organizations. In addition to undergraduate academics, QU has a research infrastructure including research labs, an ocean vessel, technical equipment and a library including a collection of rare manuscripts.

The university serves on behalf of the government and private industry to conduct regional research, particularly in areas of the environment and energy technologies. Qatar University has a student body of fifty-two nationalities, 65% of which are Qatari nationals. About 35% are children of expats. Women make up approximately 70% of the student population, and are provided their own set of facilities and classrooms. QU has an alumni body of over 30,000 graduates, and an active student body of over 20,000 students.

== History ==
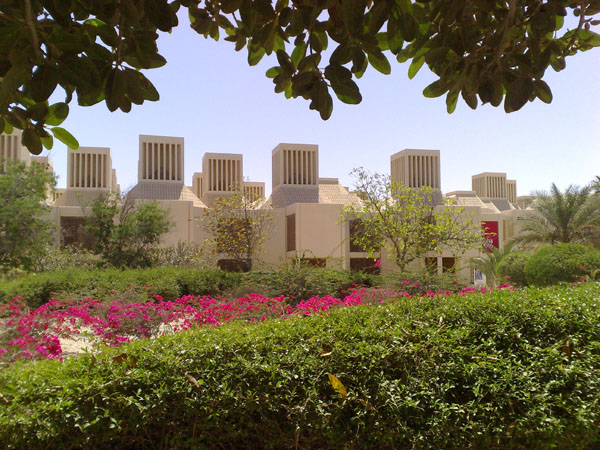
East View of Qatar University

The institution was established as the College of Education by a decree from the Emir of Qatar in 1973. The college began with a total of 150 students (93 women and 57 men) and was later expanded to become the University of Qatar in 1977 with four new colleges: Education, Humanities & Social Sciences, Sharia & Law & Islamic Studies, and Science.

Three years later, the College of Engineering was established. By then, the number of enrolled students was 2,600. This was followed by the establishment of the College of Business & Economics in 1985. The new colleges prompted a large expansion of the university campus, which was overseen Kamal El Kafrawi. By Fall Semester 2005 / 2006, the number of registrants for study at Qatar University had reached 7660 male and female students, equaling almost 1/6 of the eligible Qatari population.

As of 2011, there are seven colleges: College of Education, College of Arts and Sciences, College of Shariah and Islamic Studies, College of Engineering, College of Law, College of Business & Economics, and College of Pharmacy. The new College of Pharmacy was established in 2006, with its first intake of BSc (Pharm) students in 2007.

Between 2003 and 2015, the president of the university was Sheikha Abdulla al-Misnad. She left in 2015. Her replacement was Hassan Rashid Al-Derham, who currently holds the position, and is the university's sixth president. Al-Derham received his doctoral degree from the University of South Wales (United Kingdom).

In December 2015, the university awarded its first-ever honorary doctorate degree to Turkish president Recep Tayyip Erdoğan.

In 2019, the College of Dental Medicine was founded, which is the tenth college for Qatar University. The college has a competitive 25 seats in its first class and is a six-year program leading to a Doctor of Dental Medicine.

== Strategies ==
The Qatar University 'Reform Project (2003-2007)' evaluated and restructured the university administration and direction to enhance the quality of instruction and place emphasis on research. The reform was initiated in 2003, led by Sheikh Tamim bin Hamad Al Thani, QU former president Dr. Sheikha al-Misnad, and the newly established Office of Institutional Research and Planning (OIPD). It focused on three principles; “Autonomy”, “Decentralization”, and “Accountability”. While the university had previously operated as a government entity, the reformed institution would be an autonomous body governed by a board of regents who reported to the Emir. This change allowed the university to manage its own finances, stated objectives and vision, and personnel and decentralization within the university granted similar financial and personnel control to colleges, departments and programs.

Academically, the reform resulted in the establishment of offices such as the Student Learning Support Center (SLSC) and Student Counseling Center (SCC). Construction was undertaken to ensure accessibility of university facilities by handicapped persons. A newsletter, Tawasol, began publication in the university

The reform changed the title of the university from “University of Qatar” to “Qatar University” with a new slogan; “Qatar University, Changing for You” and a new university logo.

A new strategy was put in place "from reform to transformation" covering the years 2018–2022. This new strategy takes into consideration the Qatar National Vision 2030.

== Local significance ==
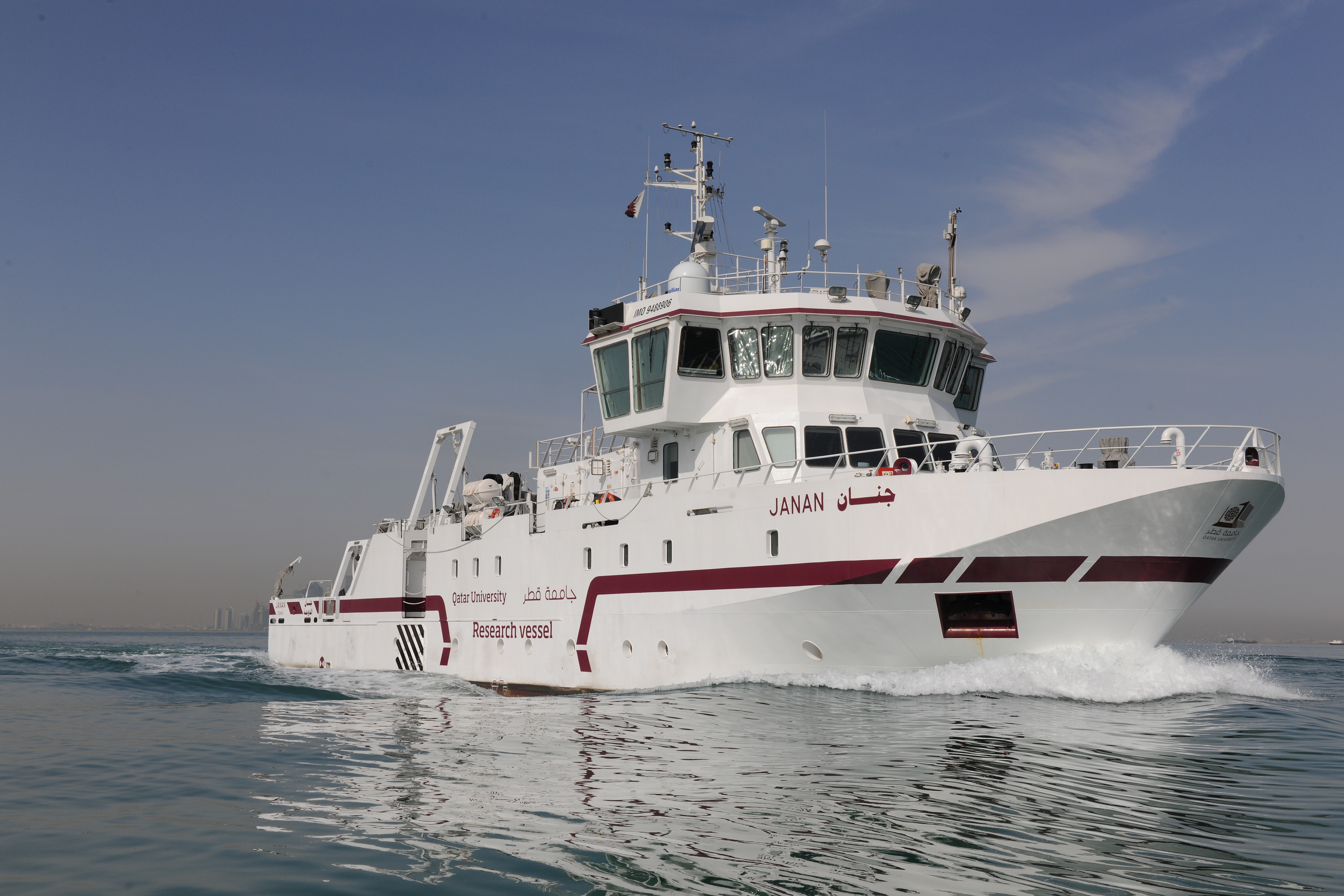
JANAN research vessel used by Qatar University's Environmental Science Center since 2011

The university contributes to the process of “Qatarization”, which places an emphasis on the hiring and support of national citizens. While Western nations may have trouble implementing such a system due to equality legislation, Qatari nationals only account for approximately 1/4 of the country's population, and this movement is deemed necessary to maintain cultural and national identity.

On 9 October 2021, Qatar University hosted 3MT (Three Minutes Thesis) competition with the participation of six local universities (Doha Institute for Graduate Studies, Hamad Bin Khalifa University, Al Rayyan International University College, Virginia Commonwealth University- Qatar, Texas A&M University at Qatar (Tamuq) and University of Calgary-Qatar). The 3MT Competition is an academic competition that challenges Masters and PhD students to describe their research within three minutes to a general audience.

== World view and influence ==
University rankings

Global – Overall
- ARWU World: 501–600 (2023)
- QS World: =173 (2024)
- THE World: 251–300 (2024)
- USNWR Global: =478 (2023)

Qatari leaders have recognized the vulnerability of oil and natural gases as a long-term economic model, especially for a smaller area such as Qatar.

The university has directed funding towards contributions to international projects. This has included taking part in global environmental studies through regional measurements, promotion of energy-awareness, and the recent contribution to CERN of data gathered through the university's new positron beam.

Since graduate programs are not available in many fields, Qatar University often works closely with a network of international affiliate schools. Students who have shown exceptional potential or progress can often receive sponsorship from the university for graduate studies abroad, on the condition that they will return to work once finished.

== Construction ==
Qatar University is situated on the northern edge of Doha in the district of Al Tarfa, approximately 16 kilometers from the city center. Due to the growth of the city, this area has recently become more valuable, and a popular development site for upscale residential and commercial buildings. QU has agreed to lease a portion of its property to the construction of new commercial zones to the north and east, as well as a substantial plot for the College of the North Atlantic to the south.

A QAR 20 million Scientific and Applied Research Center is under construction.

== Colleges and Departments ==
=== College of Arts and Sciences ===
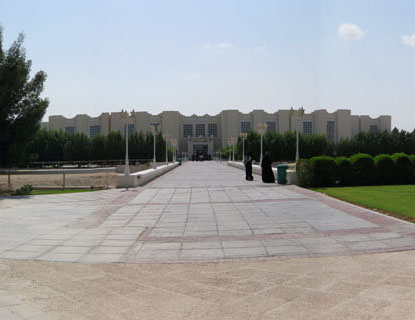
The Women's College of Arts and Sciences at Qatar University in 2008

The College of Arts and Sciences was established in 2004 through the merging of two former colleges; the College of Humanities and Social Sciences, and the College of Science. It is the largest college by both number of programs and student population at Qatar University, with a total of 2,383 students; 1,933 Arts majors and 450 Science majors. This reflects approximately 37% of the student body. The college has 240 faculty members, including Dean Dr. Kassim Ali Shaaban.

Departments:

- Department of Arabic Language
  - History
- Department of Biological & Environmental Sciences
  - Biological Sciences
  - Environmental Sciences
- Department of Chemistry & Earth Sciences
  - Chemistry Program accredited by the CSC
- Department of English Literature and Linguistics
- Department of Health Sciences
  - Biomedical Program accredited by the NAACLS
  - Human Nutrition Program
  - Public health
- Department of Humanities
- Department of Mass Communication
  - Mass Communication Program
- Department of Mathematics, Statistics & Physics
- Department of Social Sciences
  - Social Work
  - Psychology
  - Sociology
  - International Affairs
  - Policy, Planning and Development
  - Statistics
- Sport Science

Programs:

- Arabic for Non-Native Speakers Program

=== College of Business & Economics ===
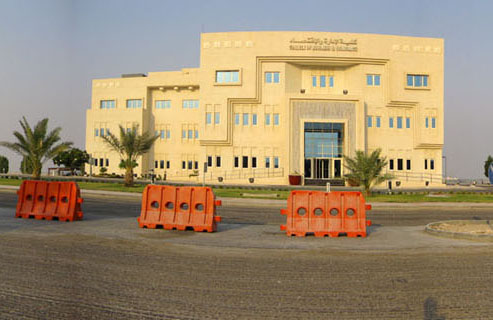
Old Men's College of Business & Economics at Qatar University in 2008

Founded in 1985, it has begun work on a new QR 185 million facility to accommodate its student body and provide resources. Dr. Nitham M. Hindi was appointed as Dean in August 2010.

Departments:

- Accounting and Information Systems
- Finance and Economics
- Management and Marketing
- Marketing
  - The college is accredited by the Association to Advance Collegiate Schools of Business (AACSB). An MBA degree program is available for graduate students, as well as a CPA testing program.

=== College of Education ===
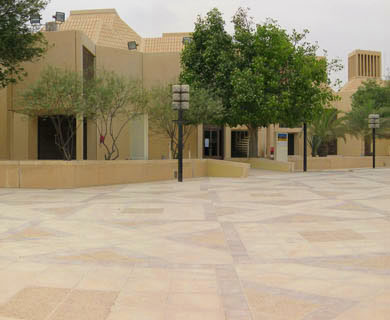
Qatar University's Old College of Education - Men's side entrance in 2008

The College of Education was the primary academic body under which Qatar University was founded in 1973. The dean is Dr. Hissa Sadiq.

Departments:

- Educational Sciences
- Psychological Sciences
- Art Education

=== College of Engineering ===
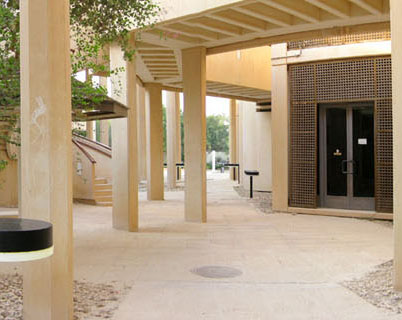
Old College of Engineering corridor at Qatar University in 2008

The College of Engineering was established in 1980, and has become one of the largest at Qatar University. The college offers both undergraduate and graduate courses.

The college's previous dean, Dr. Alfadala, was also the founder and former chairman of the university's Gas Processing Center (GPC) research facility. The current dean is Dr. Khalifa Al-Khalifa.

==== Programs ====
The College of Engineering offers the following undergraduate programs: Bachelor of Architecture, Bachelor of Science in Chemical Engineering, Bachelor of Science in Civil Engineering, Bachelor of Science in Computer Engineering, Bachelor of Science in Computer Science, Bachelor of Science in Electrical Engineering, Bachelor of Science in Industrial and Systems Engineering, Bachelor of Science in Mechanical Engineering.

The College of Engineering offers the following graduate programs: Masters of Science in Computing, Masters of Urban Planning & Design, Masters of Science in Engineering Management, Masters of Science in Environmental Engineering, Master of Science in Civil Engineering, Master of Science in Mechanical Engineering, Master of Science in Electrical Engineering.

The College of Engineering offers the following Doctor of Philosophy (PhD) programs: Doctor of Philosophy in Architecture, Doctor of Philosophy in Urban Planning, Doctor of Philosophy Chemical Engineering, Doctor of Philosophy in Computer Science, Doctor of Philosophy in Computer Engineering, Doctor of Philosophy in Civil Engineering, Doctor of Philosophy in Electrical Engineering, Doctor of Philosophy in Industrial and Systems Engineering, Doctor of Philosophy in Mechanical Engineering, Doctor of Philosophy in Engineering Management, Doctor of Philosophy in Environmental Engineering, Doctor of Philosophy in Material Science and Engineering.

==== Departments ====
Departments are:

- Architectural Engineering
- Chemical Engineering (ABET Substantial Equivalency accredited)
- Civil Engineering (ABET Substantial Equivalency accredited)
- Computer Engineering (ABET Substantial Equivalency accredited)
- Computer Science (ABET Substantial Equivalency accredited)
- Electrical Engineering (former chairman: Soliman Abdel-hady Soliman) (ABET Substantial Equivalency accredited)
- Mechanical Engineering (ABET Substantial Equivalency accredited)
- Industrial & System Engineering (ABET Substantial Equivalency accredited)

==== Deans ====
- Prof. Galal Shawky (1980-1990)
- Prof. Ismael Abdulrahman Taj (1990-1999)
- Dr. Mohammed Al-Hammadi (2000-2001)
- Prof. Adnan Nayfah (2003-2005)
- Dr. Nabil Al-Salem (2005-2006)
- Dr. Hassan Al-Fadala (2006-2008)
- Prof. Mazen Hasna (2008-2013)
- Prof. Rashid Alammari (2013-2016)
- Prof. Khalifa Nasser Al-Khalifa (2016-2018)
- Prof. Abdelmagid Hamouda (2018–2019)
- Dr. Khalid Kamal Naji (2019–Present)

==== Notable alumni ====
- Notable alumni include:
  - Eng. Fawaz Al-Baker executive managing director Qatar Power Company
  - Nasser Al-Khelaifi
  - Ibrahim bin Yousuf Al-Fakhro
  - Saad Ahmed Al Mohannadi
  - Ilham Al-Qaradawi

==== Research Centers ====
Gas Processing Center The center addresses the problems, challenges and opportunities facing the state of Qatar's gas processing industry. The center is focused on two main themes which are Asset Management/Process Optimization and Sustainable Development. The services provided by the center have been designed to address the necessities and challenges of both Qatar University and the Qatari Industry. These services include: Applied Research Projects/Consulting, Professional Training and Seminars, Bi-annual Gas Processing Symposium, Information Management/Library.

Kindi Lab for Computing Research

Qatar Transportation and Traffic Safety Center Road traffic accidents have major societal, health, environmental and economic impacts on Qatar's economy. Moreover, the accidents cause significant delays and traffic congestions. The expected increase in population and special events that occur in Qatar on regular basis as well as the above impacts have prompted the College of Engineering, Qatar University to establish Qatar Transportation and Traffic Safety Center (QTTSC) to conduct extensive studies and analysis of accidents data and information in order to significantly reduce such road accidents.

The studies will include studies related to patterns of accidents, factors that contribute to road accidents, drivers' attributes and others as well as recommendations for approaches that result in an improved road safety.

There are three major areas of concern: Road User Behavioral Change, Vehicle Safety and Biomechanics and Road Engineering and Environment. The center will be housed and managed by the College of Engineering and its funding will be obtained from different sources including Qatar University, companies and government agencies.

ChemE Car Competition The ChemE competition's aim is to encourage creativity and innovation among students and also to reach out high school students to motivate them towards studies in chemical engineering. The competition requires participants to design and race a small car that is operated through chemical processes and carrying a load of water (0-500g) for a distance of between 15 and 30 meters.

=== College of Law ===
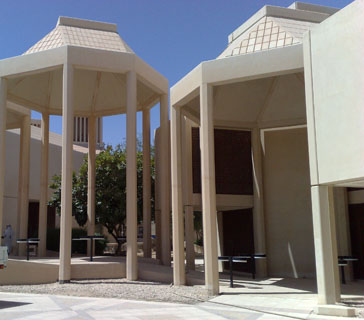
Former Men's College of Law at Qatar University. Formerly Women's facility was combined with the College of Sharia and Islamic Studies building.

In 2004, Qatar University instated a College of Law by separating the law department of the existing College of Sharia. 10%-15% of its undergraduate program is instructed in English. In 2008, it asked the ABA to conduct a full-scale, on-site evaluation of all aspects of the school's objectives, programs, and administration. Many of the recommendations made by the ABA were subsequently implemented including the introduction of the first legal writing and research skills program (taught in English) established in any law school in the Middle East. The legal skills program was recognized at the 13th Global Legal Skills Conference held in Melbourne, Australia in December 2018.

The College of Law has the highest percentage of Qatari students of any college in Qatar University.

The College of Law is accredited by the High Council for the Evaluation of Research and Higher Education (HCERES) and the British Accreditation Council (BAC). The College of Law also partners with leading law schools, and welcomes visiting Fulbright fellows and exchange students.

The International Review of Law is an international legal periodical that is published by the College of Law (through Qatar University Press) biannually. It is an internationally peer-reviewed multi-lingual law journal that seeks to articulate contemporary legal discourse across cultures and borders. The journal is open to doctrinal, context based, reformative or comparative work, in all fields of law. The journal accepts submissions in English, Arabic and French and provides abstract translations for all publications. The chief editor of the journal is currently Dr. Sonia Malak.

Dr. Mohamed Abdulaziz Al Khulaifi was appointed dean in 2014.

In November 2018, the College of Law hosted the Annual Conference of the International Association of Law Schools.

In April 2020, the College of Law will move into its new purpose build facility currently under construction. Programs:

- Undergraduate Law
- LLM in Public Law
- LLM in Private Law
- Graduate Certificate in Legal Studies

=== College of Pharmacy ===
The College of Pharmacy at Qatar University was founded as a college in 2008. It is the first pharmacy college to be established in Qatar. It began as a program in 2006, and saw its first student intake in 2007. The year 2008 also marked the college's accreditation by the CCAPP (Canada) and became the first international pharmacy program to receive accreditation by that organization. Peter Jewesson was the founding College Dean, and had also been the director of the previous Pharmacy program.

The College of Pharmacy offers three degrees:

- 5-year program Bachelor of Science in Pharmacy – BSc (Pharm)
  - Accredited by CCAPP
- 6-year Doctor of Pharmacy - PharmD
  - The PharmD degree is targeted for select graduates pursuing advanced clinical training. It is offered as a full-time study plan for QU graduates, and a part-time study plan for BSc (Pharm) pharmacists practicing in Qatar
- 2-year Master of Science in Pharmacy - MSc (Pharm)
  - The MSc (Pharm) degree is designed to build on the undergraduate degree experience.

=== College of Sharia and Islamic Studies ===
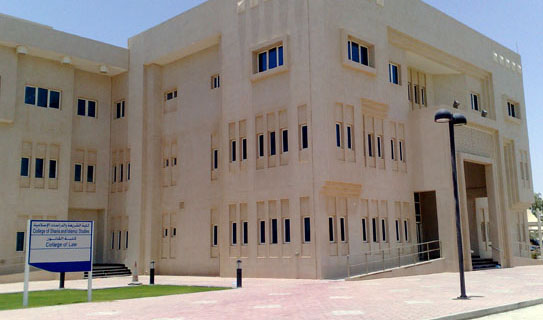
Qatar University women's College of Sharia and Islamic Studies Building. Also contains the women's College of Law, and women's College of Business & Economics classrooms.

College of Sharia and Islamic Studies was among the first founded at Qatar University when it was established in 1977. In recent years, it added new major and minor programs in subjects such as “Da’wa and Media” and “Banking and Insurance”. Dr. Ibrahim bin Abdullah Al-Ansari is the current dean.

Departments:

- Islamic Jurisprudence
- Islamic Culture & Preaching
- Foundations of Islam

=== College of Medicine ===
In December 2014, Qatar University announced the establishment of the College of Medicine which was planned to take the 1st batch in by Fall 2015 (September) and graduate them by 2021.

=== College of Health Science ===
The College of Health Science (CHS) was founded in 2016 following 30 years as a department within various colleges at Qatar University. CHS is the national provider of health sciences education and research in Qatar and offers undergraduate (BSc) programs in biomedical sciences, human nutrition and public health, as well as graduate programs; (MSc) in biomedical science and master of public health (MPH).

=== Sport Science Program ===
The Sport Science Program was opened to students in the fall 2009 semester. The program was constructed as a joint project sponsored by Aspire Academy. While QU's Sport Science program is not an independent college, it has been formed with autonomy from the other colleges, much as the College of Pharmacy began.

The Program offers a Bachelor of Science degree which allows for one of 3 concentrations:

- Sport Management
- Exercise and Fitness
- Physical Education

== Honors Program ==
Qatar University's Honors Program was established in 2009. to provide academic opportunities for high-achieving students. Students in the program complete 24 credit hours of honors courses, as part of the 120 credit hours necessary for their undergraduate program. Students must graduate with an overall GPA of 3.5 or above, with a minimum score of 3.0 in all honors courses. Qatar University holds strict requirements for students wishing to apply:

- Minimum of 90% or higher in high school certificate or an equivalent certificate (current QU students must complete 12 to 18 post-foundation credit hours with a 3.5 GPA)
- Minimum score of 500 on the TOEFL exam or 5.5 on the ILETS
- Minimum score of 550 in the Math portion of SAT, 24 on the ACT
- Two letters of recommendation from current or previous instructors, counselors or academic advisers
- Copy of transcript
- A written essay
- Pass an interview

In addition to academic advisers, Honors students are assigned an adviser to assist with honors issues and other consultation. For courses which are not offered as Honors, students may propose an "Honors Contract" to specify honors-level objectives and goals to be monitored by a sponsoring professor.

== Qatar University student clubs ==
Qatar University is the biggest and most popular university in Qatar, as stated by UniRank. It has 10 colleges that teach the courses in either Arabic or English. Qatar University Student clubs represent the non-academic aspect of student's life. These clubs are student meetings that fall under the supervision of the Student Activities Department. It aims to build the educational, life and social experience of students.

=== Student clubs ===
Student clubs are divided into three categories:

- Departmental and college clubs such as the Statistics Club
- Talent and skill clubs such as the Voice Club and the Poetry Club
- Clubs and public associations, such as the Book Club

== Research centers ==
Research is conducted in and across colleges and is buoyed by an increased research budget, a multimillion-dollar Research Complex and partnerships.

18 centers of research

1. Biomedical Research Center (BRC)
2. Center for Advanced Materials (CAM)
3. Environmental Science Center (ESC)
4. Social and Economic Survey Research Institute (SESRI)
5. Laboratory Animal Research Center (LARC)
6. Qatar University Young Scientists Center (QUYSC)
7. Ibn Khaldon Center for Humanities and Social Sciences
8. Central Lab Unit (CLU)
9. Center for Entrepreneurship (CFE)
10. Center for Sustainable Development (CSD)
11. Centre for Law and Development (CLD)
12. Early Childhood Center
13. Gas Processing Center (GPC)
14. Gulf Studies Center (GSC)
15. KINDI Center for Computing Research (KINDI)
16. National Center for Educational Development (NCED)
17. Qatar Mobility Innovation Center (QMIC)
18. Qatar Transportation and Traffic Safety Center (QTTSC)

== Notable alumni ==
- Nasser Al-Khelaifi, businessman, president of Paris Saint-Germain
- Mansour Mohamed al-Muslah, Qatari businessman
- Muhammad Harithi, Omani poet and writer
- Mariam Al Maadeed, Qatari scientist, vice president for research and graduate studies at Qatar University
- Amal Al-Malki, academic
- Noor Al Mazroei, chef and activist
- Saad Al Mohannadi, Qatari president of Public Works Authority Ashgal
- Moza bint Nasser, consort of Hamad bin Khalifa Al Thani
- Nourah Al Saad, writer
- Fatma Al Sharshani, mural artist and calligrapher
- Abdulla bin Abdulaziz bin Turki Al Subaie, Qatari Minister of Municipality
- Abdulrahman bin Hamad bin Jassim bin Hamad Al Thani, Qatari Minister of Culture
- Jawaher bint Hamad bin Suhaim Al Thani, wife of the Emir of Qatar
- Mohammed bin Abdulrahman bin Jassim Al Thani, Qatari Prime Minister

== See also ==
- List of Islamic educational institutions
- Qatar University Library
- Qatar University Stadium
- Education in Qatar
- List of universities and colleges in Qatar
