= Qatar University Library =

Library at Qatar University

- مكتبة جامعة قطر
- 25.377172906619187°N 51.49057033181318°E
- Location: Doha, Qatar
- Type: Academic library
- Established: 1973

Other information
- Affiliation: Qatar University
- Website: http://www.qu.edu.qa/library/

Qatar University Library serves students, faculty, staff, and researchers at Qatar University in Qatar. The first building was constructed in 1973.

The old building operates in two separate facilities: the women’s library facility, a four-story building with a total area of 1,200 square meters, and the men’s library facility, a two-story building with 3,000 square meters.

The Library's new building was inaugurated by HH Sheikha Hind bint Hamad Al-Thani in October 2012.

The Library holds around 350,000 books and eBooks, 167 databases, and a Digital Hub that includes both the Institutional Repository and the Archives, which encompasses QU archives, slide collections, historical documents, oral history interviews, and more.
