= Mariam Al Maadeed =

Qatari physicist

Professor Mariam Al Maadeed
- مريم المعاضيد
- Citizenship: Qatari
- Known for: Vice President for Research and Graduate Studies at Qatar University
- Children: Four
- Scientific career
- Fields: Materials Science, Polymers/Composites, Nanotechnology, Materials Characterizations
- Workplaces: Qatar University

Mariam Al Maadeed (Arabic: المعاضيد, also written AlMa'adeed) is a Qatari materials scientist and Professor in Physics and Materials Science at Qatar University. She previously served as the Vice President for Research and Graduate Studies at Qatar University.

== Biography ==
Al Maadeed is the founder of the Center for Advanced Materials (CAM) as well as the Masters program of Materials Science and Technology, both at Qatar University.

In 2016, Al Maadeed became Vice President for Research and Graduate Studies and assumed responsibility over the university's research and graduate-studies strategy and programmes.

In 2026, Al Maadeed was appointed to the Board of Trustees of Tamim Bin Hamad University for Military and Technology Sciences.

== Research ==
Al Madeed's research is in the field of polymer characterization and structure, nanocomposites and nanotechnology techniques. In 2024, Al Maadeed was included in the Stanford University–Elsevier database of the world's top 2% most-cited scientists, having also appeared in previous editions of the ranking. Al Maadeed is the founder and Associate Editor-in-Chief of Emergent Materials (Springer).

== Awards and honors ==
- Islamic Educational, Scientific and Cultural Organization (ISESCO) Prize in Science and Technology, 2016.
- Mentorship Award in the Leadership Excellence for Women Awards (LEWA).
- AL-Bairaq- World Innovation Summit for Education (WISE), 2015.
- Gulf Petrochemicals & Chemicals Association (GPCA) Plastic Excellence Award 2014.
- Appreciative and Incentivizing State award on Science 2014.
- Outstanding Faculty Service Award.- Qatar University, 2013–2014.
- State of Qatar encouragement Award in Physics (2010- 2011).
- Outstanding Faculty Service Award – Special award - Qatar University (2011-2012).

== Patents ==
- Reinforced Polymer Composites from Recycled Plastic.
- Methods for Graphene production.

== Selected works ==
1. Flexible and Stretchable Electronic Composites, Authors: Ponnamma, D., Sadasivuni, K.K., Wan, C., Thomas, S., Editors: Al-Ali AlMa'adeed, Mariam (Ed.), 2015, ISBN 978-3319-23662-9
2. Biopolymer Composites in Electronics, Authors: Kishor Kumar Sadasivuni, John-John Cabibihan, Deepalekshmi Ponnamma, Mariam Ali S A Al-Maadeed, Jaehwan Kim, Print ISBN 9780128092613, Electronic ISBN 978-0081009741
3. Polyolefin Compounds and Materials, Fundamental and Industrial Applications, Editors: Mariam AlMaadeed, Igor Krupa, Springer. ISBN 978-3-319-25980-2
4. Polymer Science and Innovative Applications: Materials, Techniques, and Future Developments. Editors: Mariam AlMaadeed, Deepalekshmi Ponnamma, Marcelo Carignano. Elsevier. ISBN 9780128168080.
5. Al-Maadeed, Mariam Ali S A, Bouras, Abdelaziz, Al-Salem, Mohammed, & Younan, Nathalie (Eds.). (2023). The Sustainable University of the Future: Reimagining Higher Education and Research. Springer Nature. ISBN 3031201868, 9783031201868.
