= Center for Advanced Materials =

Qatar University research center

- مركز المواد المتقدمة
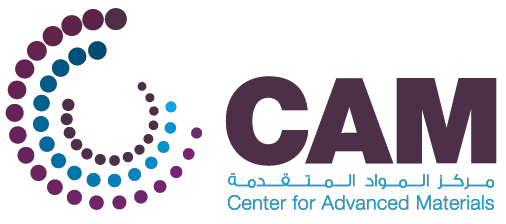

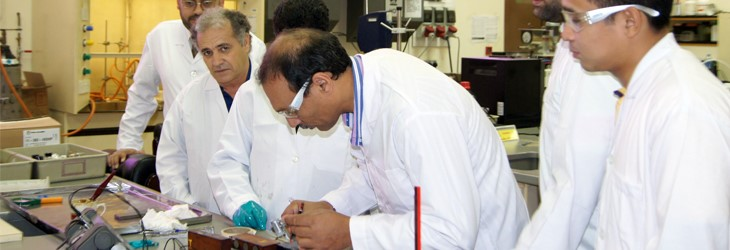
- Center for Advanced Materials
- Abbreviation: CAM
- Formation: 2002
- Type: Research Center
- Purpose: Research and Education in advanced materials
- Location: Qatar University
- Official language: Arabic and English
- Website: http://www.qu.edu.qa/offices/research/CAM/
- Formerly called: Materials Technology Unit (MTU)

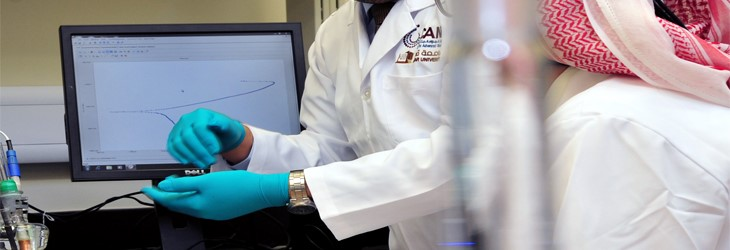
Center for Advanced Materials Researchers

The Center for Advanced Materials (CAM) is a research center at Qatar University that hosts faculty members and researchers involved in advanced materials research. It provides the opportunities for collaborative research projects between academic and industry experts, as well between faculty members and students. The Center for Advanced Materials works under Qatar University's Office of Vice President for Research and Graduate Studies. CAM's research clusters are broadly grouped into the following areas: Metallurgy, Sustainable Materials, Corrosion, Polymer Materials and Renewable Energy Resources.

In 2022, the UNESCO established a Chair on desalination at Qatar University and hosted in CAM to study water security in the Gulf region and to adapt to drought due to climate changes; The Chair contributes to capacity development to meet the UN SDG6.
