= Qatari soft power =

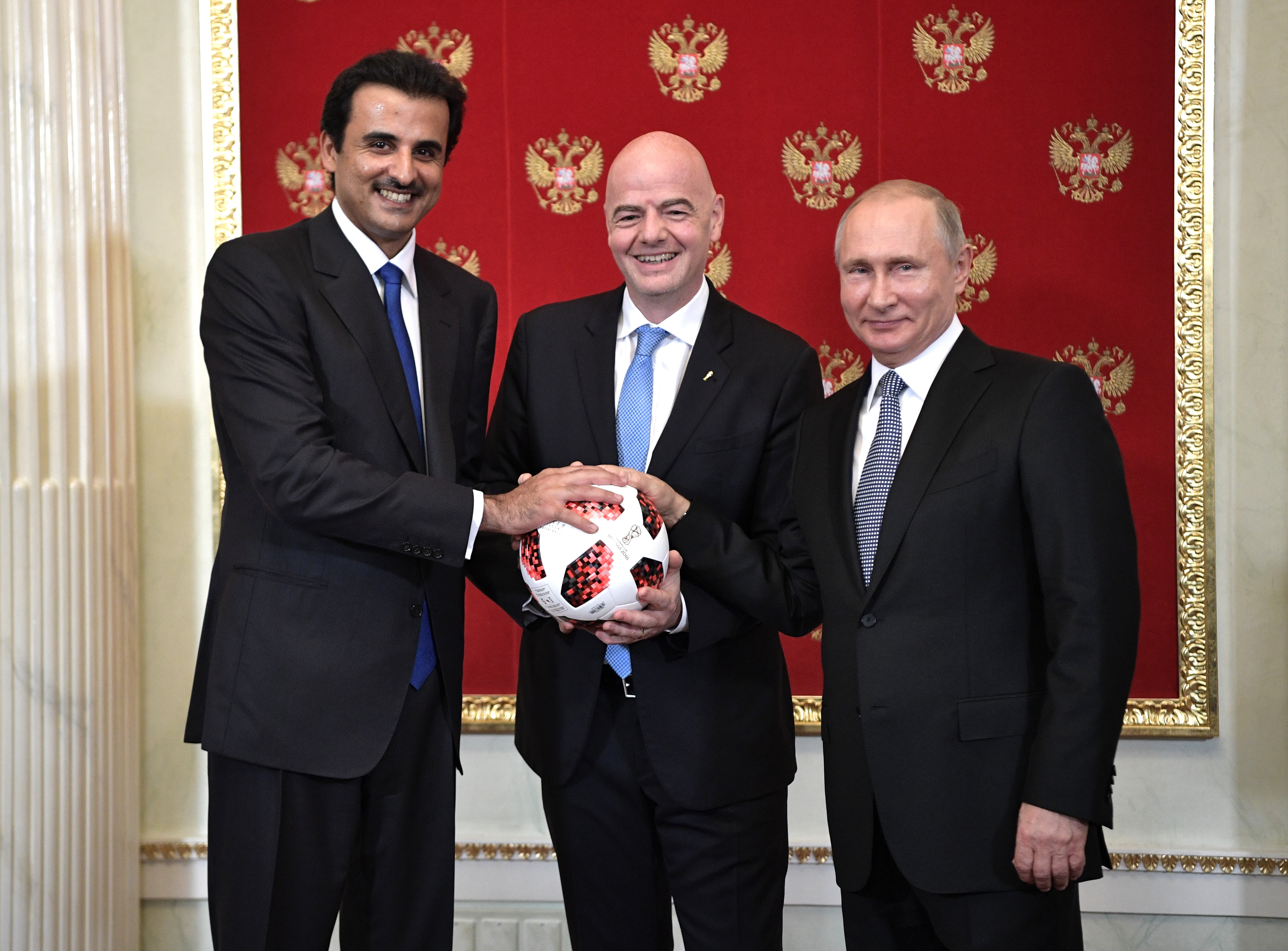
Russian president Vladimir Putin to the right, head of FIFA Gianni Infantino in the center and Emir of Qatar: Tamim bin Hamad Al Thani

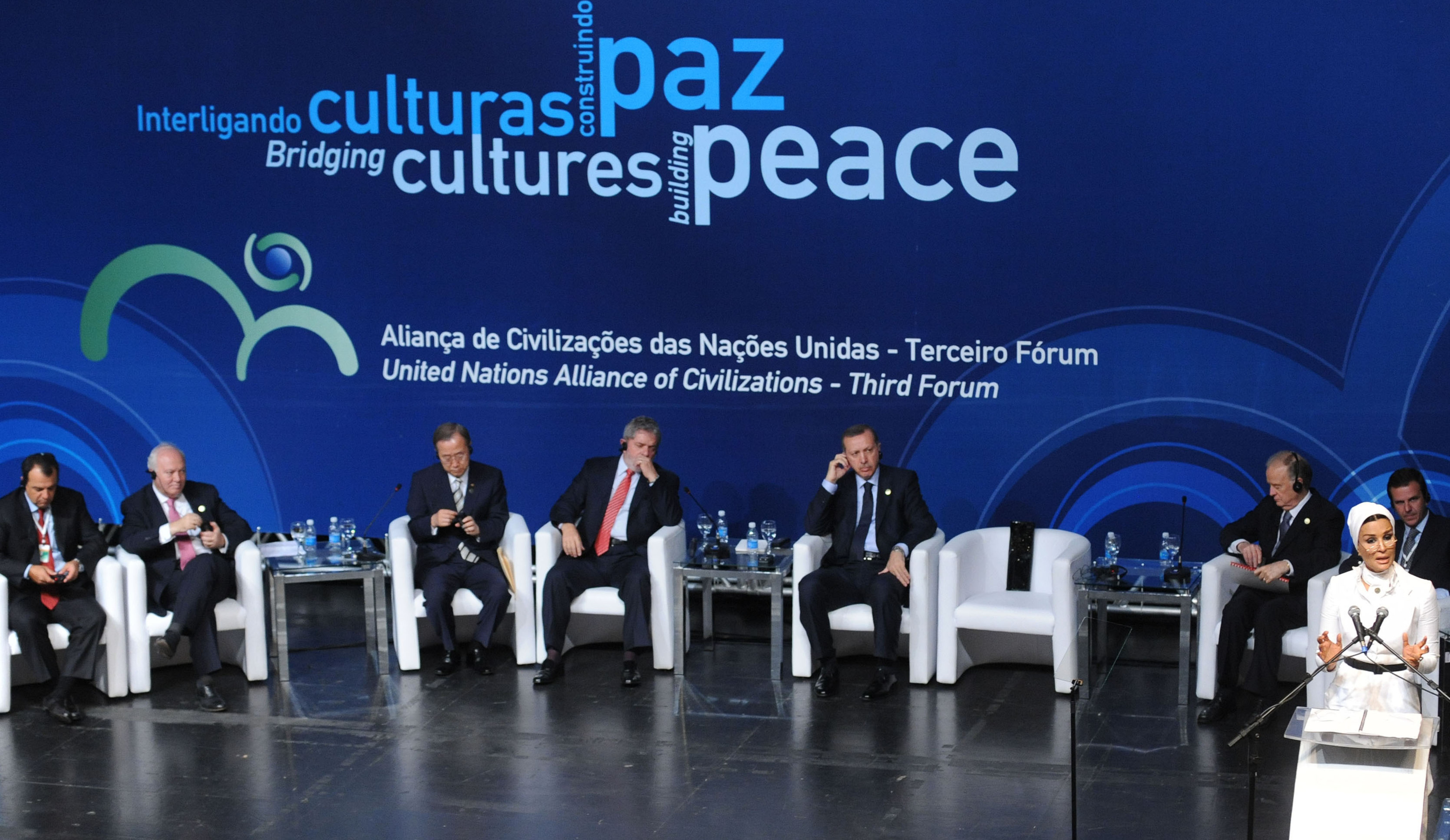
Alliance of Civilizations Forum Annual Meeting Brazil 2010, Moza Bint Nasser, the sheika and mother of the Qatari emir.

Qatar's soft power is mostly manifested by Qatar's extensive sports and media network through intermediaries owned or funded by the government, such as Qatar Sports Investment, Al Jazeera, Qatar Airways, which critics argue serve in part to divert attention from Qatar's human rights violations, discrimination against the LGBT community and sponsorship of non-state militant groups.

== Overview ==
Qatar is a sovereign state on the north eastern coast of the Arabian peninsula. It has been ruled as an absolute monarchy since gaining independence in 1971, and since the 1980s it has seen a drive towards modernisation and integration, with large infrastructure projects. These are funded by fossil fuel revenues, as the state has one of the highest GDPs in the world, following discovery of offshore oil and gas fields in the 1960s. This has led to three drivers of Qatari foreign policy, as identified by academics. Firstly, Qatar is seeking to enhance its global presence to increase its security in the region. Secondly it is developing tourism, and thirdly it has undertaken a pursuit of international soft power, seeking to become a mediator in the region.

Qatar's political influence is partly due to its relationships with various nations and groups. Al Udeid Air Base, hosting the US Central Command, is a key element of Qatar's strategic partnerships. Despite its ties with the West, Qatar also maintains relations with Iran, the Taliban, Al Qaeda, Hamas, and the Muslim Brotherhood, positioning itself as a mediator in regional conflicts.

In 2017 the Qatar diplomatic crisis saw the rapid deterioration of ties between Qatar and the Arab League. A blockade ensued led by a coalition of states headed by Saudi Arabia. They cited Qatar's alleged support for terrorism as the main reason for their actions, claiming Qatar had violated a 2014 agreement with the members of the Gulf Cooperation Council (GCC), of which Qatar is a member. Evidence emerged that the crisis had been orchestrated by the United Arab Emirates (UAE), and the blockade was lifted in 2021. Against this backdrop, Qatar sought to nest its power relationships and further develop a strategy of soft power.

The 2022 FIFA World Cup in Qatar was accused of being "sportswashing," using sports events to improve a country's image. Qatar faced criticism for its alleged mistreatment of migrant workers and was accused of using the World Cup to divert attention from these issues. Qatar's investments in sports extend beyond the World Cup, with significant stakes in football clubs and sports broadcasting.

== Education ==
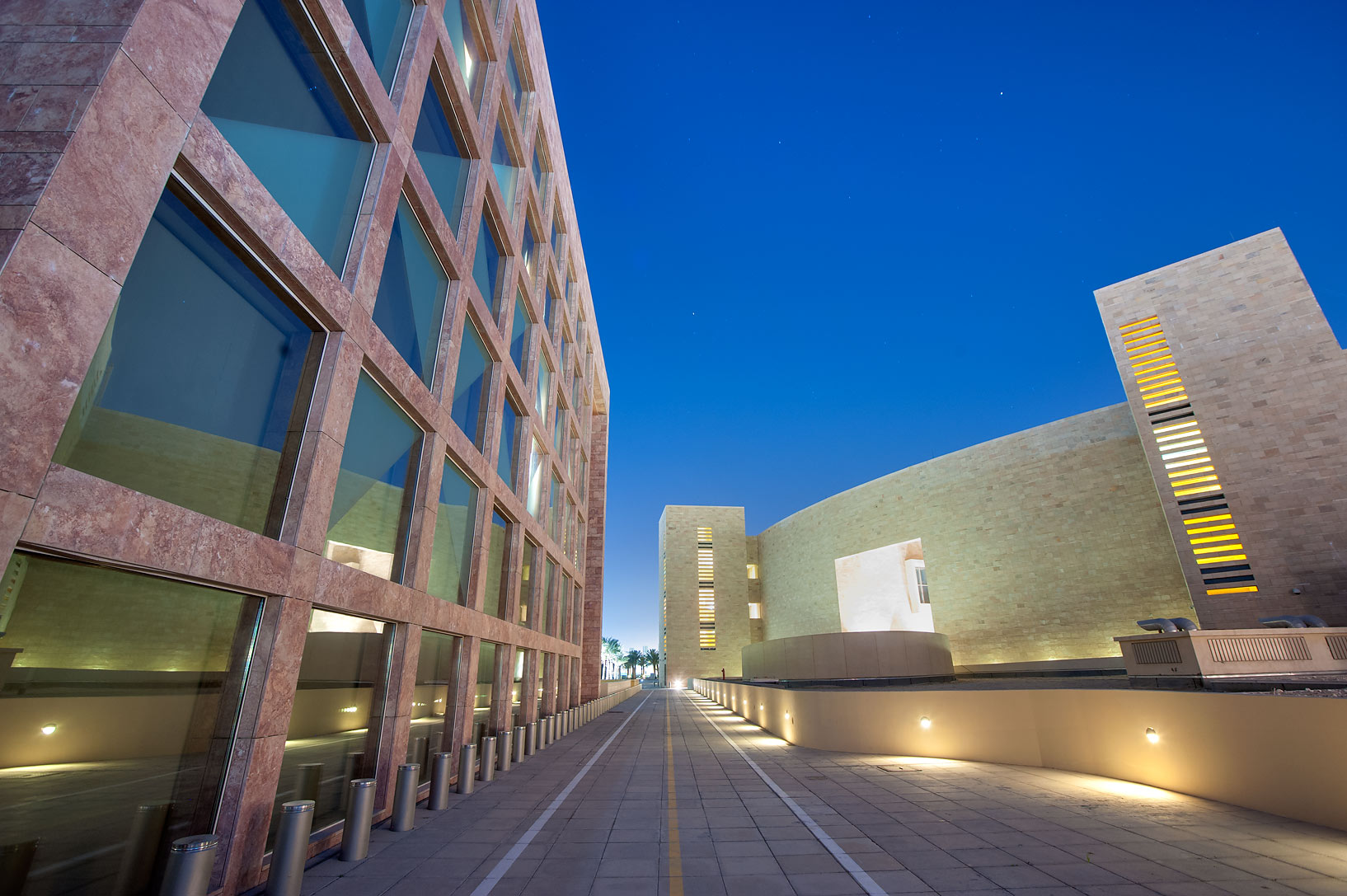
Carnegie Mellon University in Qatar

Qatar has sought to extend its soft power through educational performance. In 1997 it created the Education City campus, spanning some 14 square kilometres. The prestige of this was strengthened through educational links with universities in the US and the United Kingdom. Overseas branches of these institutions are hosted in the Education city.

In 2023, Qatar became the largest foreign donor to US universities, having donated at least US$4.7 billion between 2001 and 2021. Some of these schools are considered amongst the most prestigious in the US and include Ivy league universities.

=== Qatar Foundation ===
The Qatar Foundation for Education, Science and Community Development is a prominent state-led non-profit in Qatar. It was founded in 1995 by then-Emir Hamad bin Khalifa Al Thani as a waqf, with public funds and land provided by the Qatari government. It is headed by Hamad's wife, Moza bint Nasser Al-Missned, and several of their children have held positions in its boards. For these reasons and others, despite its official designation as a "private foundation for public benefit", several scholars have considered it "a pernicious mixing of and calculated confusion between public and private", "a vehicle for implementing state interests", "elite led strategic philanthropy", and so on.

Its focus lies in promoting education, science, research, and community development. The foundation has actively engaged numerous international universities to set up campuses in Qatar and has ventured into commercial investments as well. While its efforts are seen as influential in various sectors, critics have described its activities as akin to influence peddling or lobbying.

Among its educational achievements, the foundation has established multiple Qatar Academy branches, the Awsaj Academy for students with learning challenges, and the Academic Bridge Program, which offers post-secondary educational opportunities. Additionally, it partnered with the RAND Corporation to operate the RAND-Qatar Policy Institute from 2003 to 2013.

The Qatar Foundation assisted in the establishment branches of eight international and one local university near Doha since 1998. These include Virginia Commonwealth University, Weill Cornell Medicine-Qatar, Texas A&M University at Qatar, Carnegie Mellon University Qatar, Georgetown University School of Foreign Service in Qatar, Northwestern University in Qatar, and Hamad Bin Khalifa University (HBKU). HEC Paris in Qatar launched the country's first EMBA in 2011, and University College London Qatar operated from 2011 to 2020. The foundation's substantial donations to these universities have raised concerns and prompted investigations by the US Education Department.

In addition to its educational ventures, the Qatar Foundation sponsors the World Innovation Summit for Education (WISE), an annual event in Doha since 2009. The universities on its campus run various research programs and collaborate with QF's applied research bodies. QF also maintains partnerships with the Royal Society and the James Baker Institute at Rice University.

=== Institutes ===
The Brookings Institution in Washington received financial support from Qatar, notably a $14.8 million grant in 2013 for the Brookings Doha Center. While another grant in 2017 followed, its exact amount remains undisclosed, as Brookings does not specify foreign contributions. In 2021, Brookings ended its association with the Doha Center, shifting focus to "digital and global engagement." The closure coincided with an FBI investigation into former Brooking's president John Allen, who left amid revelations of unregistered lobbying for Qatar. Allen had advocated against the Saudi-led blockade of Qatar during his tenure. The Justice Department closed the investigation in January 2022 without pressing charges.

Other think tanks, such as the Stimson Center, have received Qatari funding, as revealed in a 2020 report from the Center for International Policy.

== Sports ==
=== Qatar Sports Investment ===
Founded in 2005 and based in Doha, Qatar Sports Investments (QSI) is a closed shareholding organization believed to be owned by Qatar's finance ministry and the Qatar Olympic Committee. As a subsidiary of the Qatar Investment Authority (QIA), QSI reinvests its revenues into Qatar's sports, leisure, and entertainment sectors. Led by Chairman Nasser Al-Khelaifi and Vice Chairman Adel Mohammed Tayyeb Mustafawi, QSI has expanded its influence in international sports, notably acquiring Paris Saint-Germain (PSG) in 2011 and becoming its sole owner by 2012. Additionally, its portfolio includes Burrda, a sports brand, and NextStep Marketing. In October 2022, QSI bought a 21.67% stake in S.C. Braga for €80 million and expressed interest in acquiring West Ham United in early 2023. In 2023, QSI also ventured into padel by acquiring the World Padel Tour to establish a new global circuit starting in 2024.

=== 2022 FIFA World Cup ===
The 2022 World Cup in Qatar was marked by substantial investments in infrastructure, including new transit systems, upscale accommodations, and upgraded facilities. The Qatari government aimed to showcase its economic and technological advancements, using the event as a platform to attract millions of visitors and captivate billions of viewers worldwide.

One week after Qatar won the bid to host the 2022 FIFA tournament, the Qatar Foundation (QF), Qatar's development nonprofit, carried out a $220 million deal to sponsor FC Barcelona's kits. Within six months, an entity of Qatar's sovereign wealth fund, the Qatar Investment Authority (QSI), invested up to $58 million to acquire ownership of the French club Paris Saint-Germain. Shortly afterwards, Qatar's media conglomerate, Al Jazeera, spent $130 million to secure broadcasting rights for top-tier Ligue 1 matches in French households. These initiatives have continued to gain momentum in the subsequent years, with renowned players like Lionel Messi, Neymar, and Kylian Mbappé sporting shirts featuring a logo of Qatar Airways, owned by the Qatari government. Qatar, in anticipation of potential criticism is said to have offered fans incentives to attend the World Cup, whilst requiring them to participate in choreographed performances and report any criticism on social media.

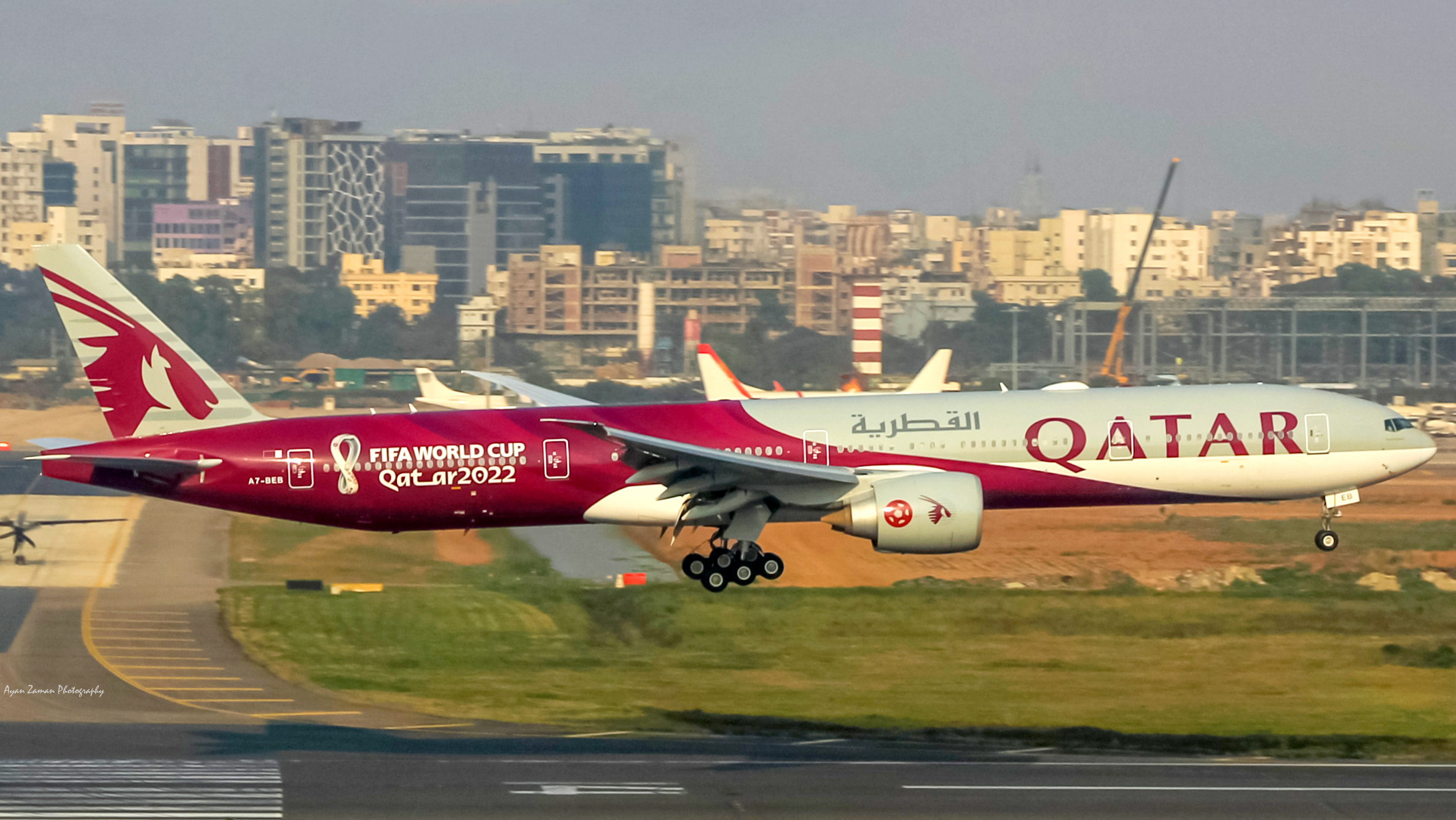
Qatar Airways, with the symbol of the 2022 FIFA World Cup

=== Other sports ===
Qatar has invested heavily in clubs, competitions, and confederations across six continents in the late 20th and early 21st centuries. Qatar has been criticized as employing modern sportswashing focuses on engaging foreign audiences on their home turf unlike historical approaches that relied on staging events. Qatar utilized diverse channels such as commentary, commerce, and community involvement, aligning with football's value chain to connect with global audiences. Qatar is said to collaborate with intermediaries, including state-owned enterprises and government-organized NGOs, to secure multimillion-dollar deals globally.

According to the Journal of Democracy the two main types of intermediaries are state-owned enterprises such as QSI and beIN Sports (previously a subsidiary of Al Jazeera), and non-governmental organizations organized by the government, like the Qatar Foundation. These intermediaries according to the Journal of Democracy, leverage the flexibility of globalization's regulatory landscape, turning sports investments into profitable ventures that contribute to Qatar's economic diversification beyond its reliance on oil and gas. Financial gains are not the sole rewards of sportswashing; there are also reputational benefits. Sportswashing which is said to involve the leveraging of sports' bankability to misinform and manipulate global audiences. Critics argued that Influencers, using the example of celebrity athlete David Beckham, Qatar's world cup ambassador, in 2019, may share testimonials praising certain aspects of a country, such as Qatar's World Cup facilities, to advance favorable narratives.

However, these references may contradict reports of migrant exploitation, including wage discrimination and passport confiscation, revealing discrepancies. Another aspect of Qatar's alleged sportswashing involved the use of sports to displace damaging content. In these cases, emerging sports stories act as smokescreen in order overshadow other events. Critics argue that with each World Cup milestone, audiences become less aware and concerned about the state's misdeeds. Yet, a study analyzing British newspapers found overwhelmingly negative coverage of Qatar's World Cup, suggesting that the event has not displaced damaging content as much as observers might believe. The critics argue that Qatari efforts to shape foreign media coverage of its tournament have included updated permit terms for international film crews and restricting recording at certain locations. However, this control may trigger the "Olympic catch-22," where sporting events spotlight the unflattering side of closed societies. A Sunday Times report found that an Indian criminal network was hired by Qatar to hack into the emails of prominent critics of Qatar's World Cup. Critics in contrast have also suggested that these techniques are not as effective as thought by some.

== Arts ==
Qatar has increasingly used art as an instrument of soft power, using it to project cultural influence. Al-Mayassa bint Hamad Al Thani, chair of Qatar Museums, has spearheaded this effort and has overseen acquisitions valued in the hundreds of millions of dollars, including works by Paul Cézanne and Paul Gauguin. Under her leadership, Qatar has invested heavily in building a world-class collection and hosting major cultural events.

In 2025, Doha was announced as a host city for Art Basel, one of the most prominent contemporary art fairs. Furthermore, the Swiss edition of Art Basel in 2025 prominently featured Qatari sponsorship and programming, including a national pavilion. These efforts are part of a broader strategy by Qatar to integrate itself into elite cultural circuits traditionally dominated by Euro-American institutions.

== Foreign assets ==
Qatar strategically employs economic soft power through significant overseas investments managed by its sovereign wealth fund, the Qatar Investment Authority (QIA). Qatari Diar, the real estate subsidiary of QIA, has also made substantial investments in London properties. Qatar also owns or has major shareholding in Deutsche bank and Barclay's Bank.

== Foreign relations ==
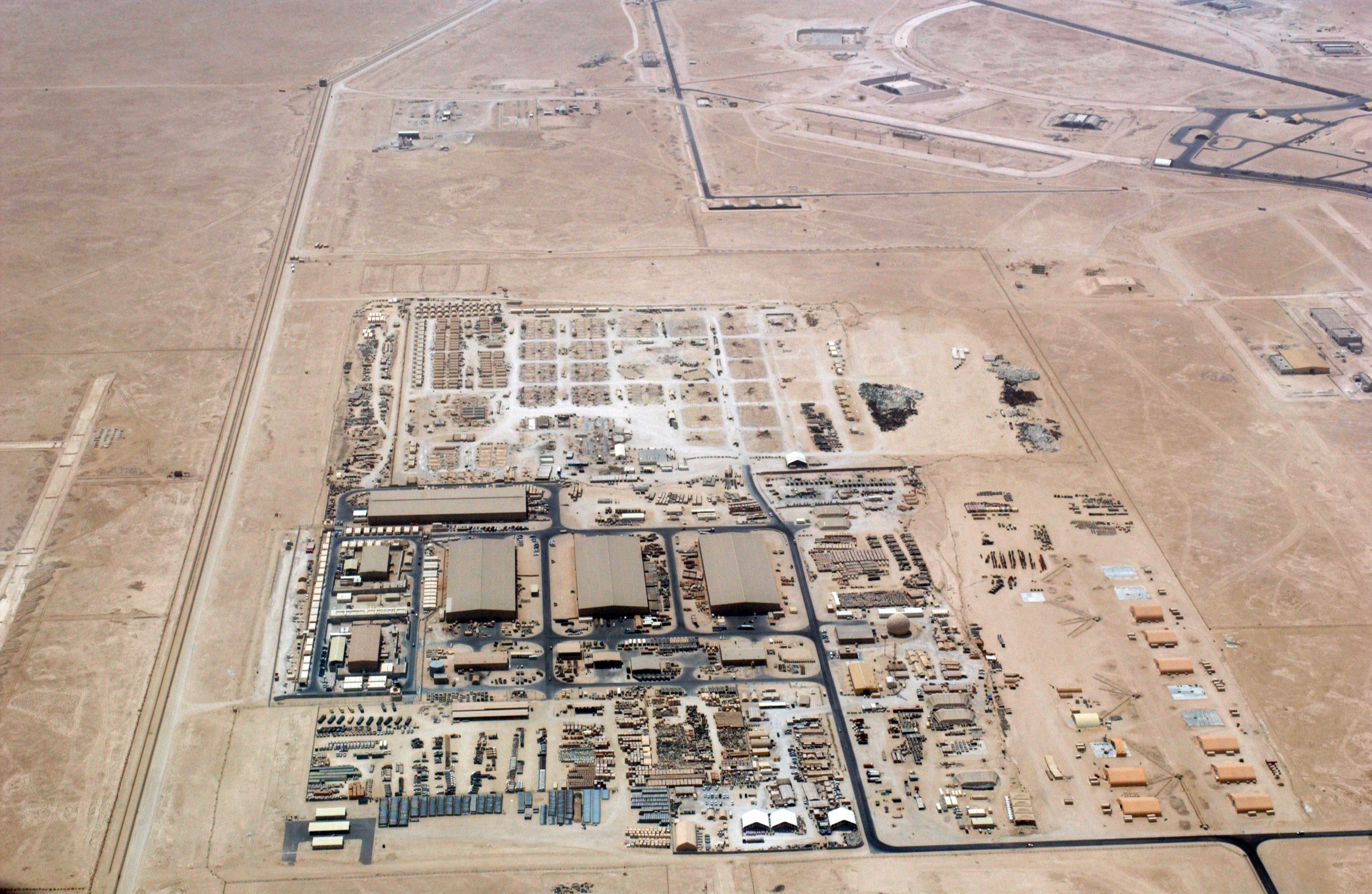
Al Udeid Air Base

Qatar's political soft power is also rooted in its extensive network of foreign relationships.

Qatar's foreign policy of maintaining relations with various groups has faced criticism, with accusations that the state is a major financial supporter of 'terrorist' organizations. In 2014, Germany's minister for international development, Gerd Mueller, accused Qatar of arming and financing ISIS fighters, though he did not elaborate, nor provide any evidence to support his claims.

== Media ==
=== Al Jazeera media network ===
Al Jazeera was established in 1996 by Qatar's Sheikh Hamad bin Khalifa al-Thani. The foundation of the channel according to Council on foreign relations, was part of Sheikh Hamad's broader strategy to reduce Qatar's reliance on Saudi Arabia and to establish diversified relationships with countries like Iran and Israel, as well as with various Islamist political organizations such as Hamas or Al-Qaeda. The network's inception aimed at providing a Qatari perspective directly into Arab homes, bypassing regional governments.

Al Jazeera's editorial stance has been influential in shaping the network's identity and Qatar's standing. It focused on underreported social issues and provided a platform for dissident voices, frequently adopting a critical stance towards governments across the region. Such coverage led to accusations from Saudi Arabia and other countries of inciting terrorism. Al Jazeera, in defence, has said it is committed to freedom of expression. In 2013, the Al Jazeera Berlin correspondent left Al Jazeera, stating he felt that the Qatari government was overtly influencing Al Jazeera.

The network's extensive coverage of the Arab Spring in 2011, which amplified dissident voices and documented government crackdowns, further strained its relationships with Gulf monarchies and Egypt. Al Jazeera's reporting often mirrored Qatar's support for groups like the Islamist Muslim Brotherhood, challenging the governments in the region. Despite diplomatic efforts and ongoing tensions, Qatar has consistently defended Al Jazeera's operation, viewing its closure as a non-negotiable matter in diplomatic negotiations. Al Jazeera is broadcast to 310 million homes as of 2017.

=== Al Jazeera English ===
Al Jazeera English, launched in 2006, has been observed to have a significantly different approach compared to its Arabic counterpart. Analysts have noted substantial differences in tone, story selection, and overall coverage between the two channels. An analyst remarked that Al Jazeera English does not closely resemble its Arabic-speaking parent channel in its style and content.

For instance, the Arabic channel of Al Jazeera has broadcast some controversial reports without challenge, such as a claim that Jewish New Yorkers received advance warnings about the September 11, 2001, attacks on the World Trade Center. It also aired commentators who blamed Jews for the 9/11 attacks. These types of provocative reports, however, were not featured on Al Jazeera English.

Additionally, a study highlighted that while Al Jazeera's Arabic coverage shows a close alignment with Qatar's foreign policy, especially regarding events in Saudi Arabia, such a correlation is not evident in the content of Al Jazeera English. This suggests that Al Jazeera English maintains a different editorial stance and content strategy, possibly aiming for a broader, more international audience, and not closely mirroring the political perspectives of Qatar, unlike its Arabic counterpart.

=== beIN Sports ===
beIN Sports, a Qatari multinational network of sports channels, is owned and operated by beIN, a media group based in Qatar. Initially known as Al Jazeera Sports and a part of Al Jazeera Media Network, beIN Sports was established to expand Qatar's influence in the global sports broadcasting market. The introduction of beIN Connect, an over-the-top content service, further expanded its reach, allowing global audiences access to live and on-demand sports content.

== Funds and institutions ==
=== Qatar National Bank ===
Qatar National Bank QPSC, founded on June 6, 1964, and headquartered in Doha, Qatar, specializes in both commercial and Islamic banking services. Its operations are divided into four main segments: Corporate Banking, Consumer Banking, Asset & Wealth Management, and International Banking. The Corporate Banking segment offers a variety of services including loans, deposits, investment advisory, and risk management activities, which involve debt securities and derivatives. Consumer Banking focuses on providing a broad range of products and services to retail customers, including loans and deposits. The Asset & Wealth Management segment caters to high net worth clients with services like asset management, brokerage, and custody. Lastly, the International Banking segment serves both corporate and individual customers in the bank's international branches, offering loans, deposits, and other related services.

Qatar National Bank (QNB), with a brand value of US$7.7 billion, is the most valuable banking brand in the Middle East and Africa. The bank's strategic sponsorship of the 2022 FIFA World Cup significantly boosted its international profile. Watched by millions worldwide the event helped QNB's global visibility. A notable example of QNB's sports-related marketing strategy is its sponsorship of the prestigious Paris Saint-Germain (PSG) football club in France. This high-profile partnership has been instrumental in elevating QNB's brand recognition on the global stage.

QNB sponsored players such as Neymar jr, football associations such as PSG, Asian football confederation, Qatar national football team, World athletics, the Asian Games in 2006, PSG Esports, FINA / CNSG Marathon swim world series 2020 and more.

Besides its involvement in esports, Ooredoo also supports various other initiatives, including sponsoring Lionel Messi and his 'The Leo Messi Foundation', backing Camp des Loges, the training facility of Paris Saint-Germain (PSG), and sponsoring the Doha Diamond League, a prestigious track and field event. It also sponsored and worked with Zinedine Zidane, the Tunisian football team, Myanmar football federation, Muscat Club, Al Nasr, the clubs: Arsenal FC, FC Barcelona, FC Internatzionale Milano and other organisations.

=== Qatar Airways ===
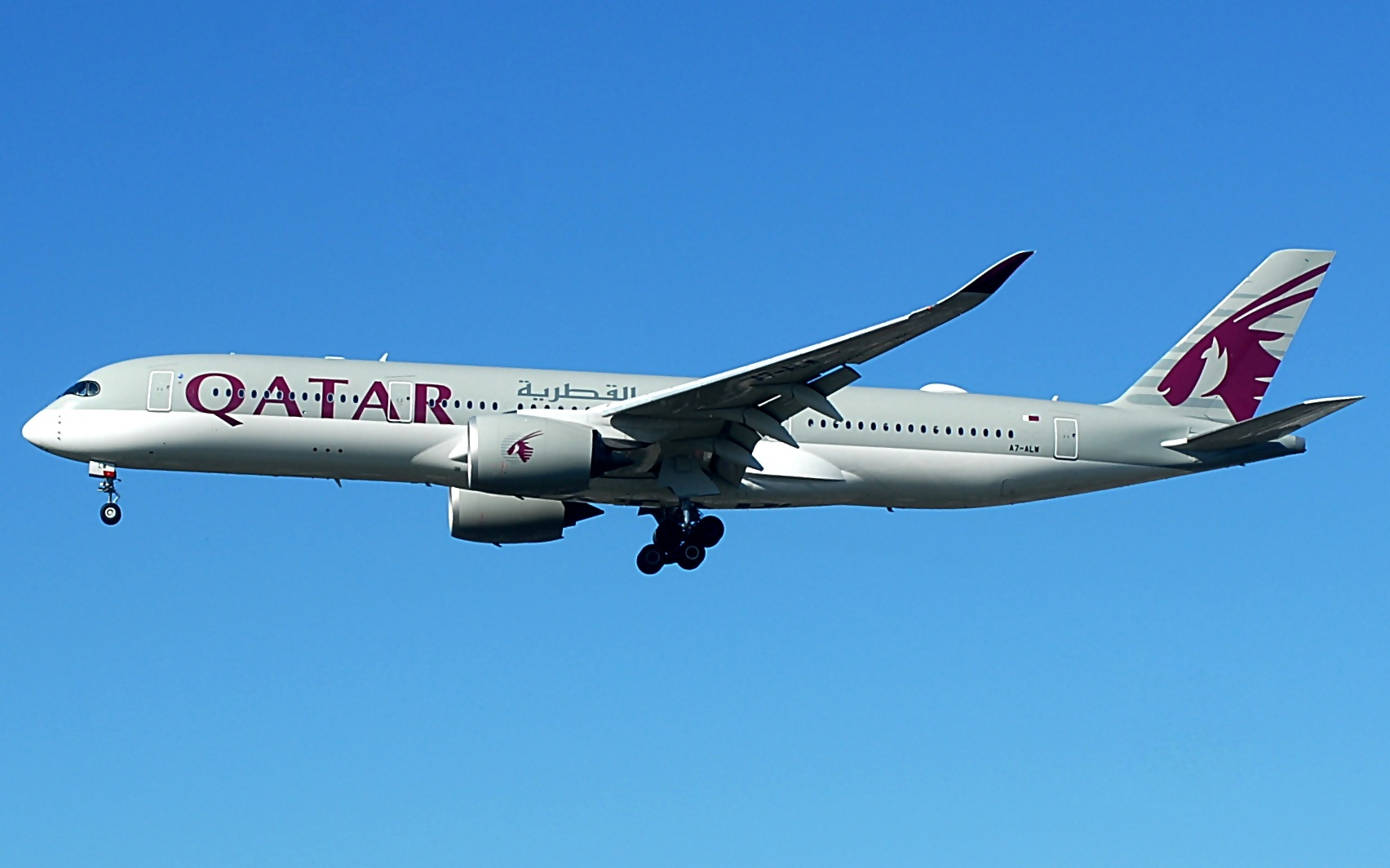
A Qatar Airways plane, part of Qatar's global branding. Qatar Airways is owned by the Qatari government.

Qatar Airways, a government-owned airline of Qatar, is led by CEO Akbar Al Baker, who also holds positions as the chairman of Qatar Tourism (Visit Qatar) and CEO of Hamad International Airport.

Qatar Airways maintains visibility through its high-profile sponsorships. This includes partnerships with organizations like FIFA and several prominent football clubs, including Bayern Munich, Paris Saint-Germain, and A.S. Roma. The airline is also a sponsor of the NBA team Brooklyn Nets. As well as sponsoring and partnering with CONCACF, CONMEBOL, FIFA 2018, FIFA Women's 2019 cup and FIFA 2022 and more.

=== Other institutions ===
Other institutions that have advanced Qatari soft power, especially in the sports field include: the Aspire Zone foundation, Commercial Bank of Qatar, Visit Qatar, QatarEnergy, Qatar Racing and Equestrian Club, Qatar petroleum and more.

== US Lobbying ==
The U.S. Justice Department disclosed that political consultants Barry P. Bennett and Douglas Watts provided misleading information about their lobbying activities for Qatar. Bennett, a former adviser to Donald Trump's 2016 campaign, led a covert lobbying campaign to promote Qatar's interests while disparaging a rival nation, believed to be either Saudi Arabia or the UAE due to their involvement in Yemen. In 2017, Bennett's firm, Avenue Strategies, received $2.1 million from Qatar for lobbying efforts. Bennett faces two criminal charges, but the case will be dismissed after he fulfills the terms of a deferred prosecution agreement, including a $100,000 fine. Watts violated the Foreign Agents Registration Act by failing to disclose his lobbying work for a foreign government. Their operations included the creation of Yemen Crisis Watch, a company conducting a public relations campaign against Qatar's unnamed adversaries. This involved lobbying Congress and the Trump administration, social media campaigns, publishing articles, and producing a TV documentary. The case is part of wider investigations into Qatar's influential lobbying during the Trump era, marked by a blockade from neighboring countries. Qatar's lobbying in 2017 was said to be aimed to influence American politicians and professionals regarding Qatar's diplomatic row with Saudi Arabia and the UAE. In 2025, Trump said it would be "stupid" to refuse Qatar's offer of a $400 million jet to serve as Air Force One. Attorney General Pam Bondi, who previously worked as a lobbyist for Qatar, signed off on the proposal.

In July 2025, William Bennett, a former U.S. secretary of education under Reagan, registered as an agent for Qatar. His Foreign Agents Registration Act (FARA) filing said he would "make efforts to publicize the fact that Qatari higher education efforts do not support radical Islamist movements or positions" in order to "help dispel contrary notions", in return for $210,000 over seven months.

== See also ==
- Italian soft power
- Project Endgame

== Bibliography ==
- al-Horr, Abdulaziz M.; Tok, M. Evren; Gagoshidze, Tekla (November 2019). "Rethinking Soft Power in the Post-Blockade Times: The Case of Qatar". Digest of Middle East Studies. 28 (2): 329–350. doi:10.1111/dome.12188.
- Arnold, Neetu (12 September 2022). "Outsourced to Qatar". National Association of Scholars.
- Brannagan, Paul Michael; Giulianotti, Richard (1 September 2018). "The soft power–soft disempowerment nexus: the case of Qatar". International Affairs. 94 (5): 1139–1157. doi:10.1093/ia/iiy125.
- El-Dabt, Laila; AlReshaid, Faisal; Park, Kathleen; AlBuloushi, Nour; Al-Enzi, Abrar (10 March 2025). "Sustainable strategic nation branding through sports: leveraging soft power via mega-event hosting". Frontiers in Sociology. 10 1521396. doi:10.3389/fsoc.2025.1521396. PMC 11934112. PMID 40134517.
- Galily, Yair (June 2025). "Beyond the Goalposts: Decoding Qatar's Soft Power Puzzle and Its Paradox". Contemporary Review of the Middle East. 12 (2): 197–208. doi:10.1177/23477989251325622.
- Kennedy, Lynne; Shahbaz, Maaira; Al Rajabi, Ala (22 May 2026). "Soft power, Arab media and Sports Mega Events: coverage of FIFA 2022 and lessons for future Arab hosting". Sport in Society: 1–13. doi:10.1080/17430437.2026.2665187.
- LaMay, Craig L (1 September 2022). "Qatar's Bein Sports and Football Broadcasting in the Middle East: International Influence and Regional Rancor". Football in the Middle East: 303–322. doi:10.1093/oso/9780197659670.003.0013.
- Roberts, D (April 2019). "Reflecting on Qatar's "Islamist" Soft Power" (PDF). Berkley Center for Religion, Peace and World Affairs, Georgetown University.
- Rosen, Armin (29 November 2023). "What Yale Has in Common With Hamas". The Tablet.
