= Qatari involvement in US higher education =

Qatari involvement in U.S. higher education dates back to 1981, according to the U.S. Department of Education's foreign funding portal. As of early 2026, $62.4 billion in aggregate funding has been disclosed, making Qatar the largest foreign funder of U.S. higher education through a combination of direct gifts, contracts, long-term operating agreements, and foreign branch campus support in Doha’s "Education City."

Qatari explanation for their large investment in U.S. education cites a desire to import more Western-style academic programs to Qatar, build local human capital, and underwrite research. However, some policymakers have questioned potential influence on academic life and the seeming lack of transparency of reporting in spite of Section 117 of the Higher Education Act, which requires U.S. colleges and universities which receive US government financial assistance to disclose any contracts or financial gifts from foreign sources valued at $250,000 or more in a calendar year to the ED. This led to the creation of the U.S. Department of Education's foreign funding portal and investigation of various universities.

The question of their influence on academic thought and future policy makers through these contributions to universities via fellowships, scholarships, faculty hiring, and academic programming has been raised extensively, particularly due to their alleged support of political and terrorist organizations, including Hamas and Al-Qaeda, and Islamist extremism.

== Funding U.S. universities with Qatari branches ==
Qatar’s involvement in U.S. higher education began at the late 1980s when the Qatar Foundation (QF) launched its Education City project in Doha, with the vision of providing high-quality education to the people of Qatar.

In 1997, Qatar Foundation selected Virginia Commonwealth University to establish what became VCUarts Qatar (established in 1998).

In 2001–2002, the Weill Cornell Medicine - Qatar agreement was signed (April 2001) and the pre-medical program opened in the fall of 2002. In 2020, the U.S. Department of Education found that Cornell had failed to disclose close to $1.9 billion in Qatari funding. In 2026 it was reported that Cornell received $2.3 billion from Qatar, out of a total of $3 billion from foreign nations.

In 2003, Texas A&M University at Qatar opened a campus, and in 2004, Carnegie Mellon University–Qatar launches its campus in Education City. In 2005, Georgetown University in Qatar (SFS-Q) opens. Finally, in 2008, Northwestern University in Qatar begins classes.

U.S. University Branches in Qatar (FY22)
Branch Institution	Funding
Carnegie Mellon University–Qatar	$740,910,073
Cornell / Weill Cornell Medicine–Qatar	$1,793,025,926
Georgetown University in Qatar	$760,562,241
Northwestern University in Qatar	$601,958,863.
Texas A&M University at Qatar	$696,412,859
Virginia Commonwealth (VCUarts Qatar)	$103,362,261

== Funding U.S. universities without Qatari branches ==
Beyond its Doha branch-campus agreements, Qatar's Qatar National Research Fund and other state-linked programs have financed research and scholarships at numerous U.S. universities that do not operate campuses in Qatar, through competitive research grants/sub-awards from the Qatar National Research Fund (QNRF), which RAND describes as awarding grants "in Qatar and abroad," especially via the National Priorities Research Program. Money also flows through scholarships that pay U.S. tuition, notably the Qatar Scholarship for Afghans Project (QSAP) run with the Institute of International Education, placing students and Qatari financing at dozens of American campuses.

Among the institutions that have received research grants are: MIT, Harvard (which received approximately US$6 million between 2013 and 2019, and more than US$12 million between January 2020 and October 2024), Rutgers University (which received $500,000 between 2021 and 2024), Columbia University, New York University, Stanford University, UC San Diego, University of Illinois Urbana-Champaign, Penn State University, University of Arizona, University of Texas at Austin, University of Chicago, University of Maine, University of Kentucky, Salve Regina University, Binghamton University (SUNY).

Based on latest reports and information released by the U.S. Department of Education’s Foreign Gift and Contract database it is evident that Qatar is the largest single foreign funding source to American education. Based on this information, colleges and universities received $6.6 billion from Qatar. The money was used to support branch campuses like Weill Cornell Medicine – Qatar, as well as research projects, scholarships, and other agreements at many U.S. schools. Cornell University received the most funding, around $2.3 billion, mostly for its campus in Qatar. Among other institutes funded heavily by Qatar are Carnegie Mellon University, Texas A&M University, and Georgetown University. These funds have raised a question about the influence of donations from foreign sources on educational institutes.

== Qatari agencies that fund U.S. universities ==
Several Qatari, state-linked, or para-public bodies (in addition to QNRF) have financed U.S. higher education through institutional contracts, research/teaching grants, or tuition-paying scholarships:

- Qatar Foundation (QF) is the primary counterparty for U.S. branch-campus contracts in Doha (e.g., VCU, Cornell, Texas A&M, CMU, Georgetown, Northwestern). These long-term operating agreements are a major channel of funding tied to Education City in Doha.
- Qatar Foundation International (QFI) is QF's U.S.-based non-profit that provides grants for Arabic language education, including university awards and faculty/research support (e.g., grants to UT-Austin Arabic faculty; first-year university tuition assistance).
- Qatar Fund for Development (QFFD) is the state development agency that underwrites Qatar scholarships and co-funds the Qatar Scholarship for Afghans Project (QSAP) placing students at dozens of U.S. colleges and universities (tuition paid via IIE partnerships).
- Education Above All (EAA) Foundation / Al-Fakhoora co-lead QSAP with QFFD and IIE, financing Afghan students’ degrees across U.S. campuses.
- Qatar Ministry of Education & Higher Education (MOEHE) runs government scholarships for Qataris to study inside or outside Qatar. The scholarships pay tuition fees directly to host universities abroad (including in the U.S.).
- State-owned / corporate scholarship sponsors include Qatar Airways and QatarEnergy sponsor degree study at approved institutions inside or outside Qatar with fully-funded tuition and stipends.

== Controversies about Qatari funding ==
Both critics and policymakers have questioned Qatar's potential influence on academic life. Airmail author Jennifer Gould speculates on Qatar's influence over both anti-Israel sentiment and policy relating to Israel, noting that "[a]s student protesters call for their universities to divest from Israel, Qatar is spending billions to influence those same schools." The Quincy Institute for Responsible Statecraft, on the other hand, is less concerned with Qatar's influence on policy, in particular, and more concerned with their influence overall, describing Qatar's academic funding as a form of soft power.

Observers have long debated the extent to which Qatar's substantial investment in higher education may influence academic culture and institutional governance within U.S. universities. A 2024 report by the Financial Times highlighted ongoing congressional investigations and growing public concern over the implications of such large Qatari donations.

At the heart of the transparency debate is Section 117 of the Higher Education Act, which requires colleges to report large foreign gifts and contracts. A Department of Education compliance paper cited ongoing under-reporting and introduced new measures for better data collection. To support enforcement, Federal Student Aid published institution-level disclosure spreadsheets twice annually.

In April 2025, a White House executive action stated that because Section 117 "has not been robustly enforced, the true amounts, sources, and purposes of foreign money flowing to American campuses are unknown," and directed stricter enforcement.

Congressional interest has produced multiple oversight and legislative efforts. A Congressional Research Service brief summarizes proposals to tighten reporting thresholds and expand disclosure requirements, and the Deterrent Act introduced in the 119th Congress would rewrite Section 117 to broaden reporting and accountability.

The Lawfare Project also examined Qatar's involvement in the American education system through the Qatar Foundation International (QFI) and expressed concerns regarding the biased presentation of content related to the Middle East. This biased approach highlights positive aspects of Islam while side-lining balanced discussions about other religions, particularly Judaism. Another survey by the project indicates that when the United States is exposed to details of foreign funding for higher education institutions, concerns are raised about Qatar's influence in shaping classroom content and discussions on campuses.

Nevertheless, Ali Al-Ansari, a spokesperson for the Qatari embassy in Washington, expressed Qatar's pride in collaborating with prominent U.S. universities to offer educational opportunities to students in Qatar and the surrounding region.

== See also ==
- Higher education in the United States
- Qatar corruption scandal at the European Parliament
- Qatari soft power
