= Amal Al-Malki =

Qatar's first female professor

Amal Mohammed Al-Malki (Arabic: أمل محمد المالكي) is a Qatari academic. In 2005, she became the first Qatari professor at an American university in her country's Education City when she was hired to teach at Carnegie Mellon University in Qatar. From 2016 to 2023, she served as the founding dean of the College of Humanities and Social Sciences at Hamad Bin Khalifa University, the first Qatari to hold the title of dean in the nine-university campus.

== Early life and education ==
Amal Al-Malki was born in Doha, Qatar, and grew up in the capital city. Her father was Qatari, while her mother had come to Qatar from Lebanon. As a child, she traveled frequently due to her father's job, and her family kept a house in London.

At age 16, she enrolled at Qatar University, where she graduated with a bachelor's degree in 1996. She then left to study in the United Kingdom, obtaining a master's degree in English and Arabic linguistics and translation from SOAS University of London in 1997. After a yearlong break, she enrolled in a doctoral program, graduating with a doctorate in comparative literature from SOAS in 2003.

== Career ==
On returning to Qatar, Malki applied to work at the newly established Carnegie Mellon University in Qatar, but the university was reluctant to hire a Qatari professor. Instead, she agreed to complete administrative work for six months, while local administrators petitioned the institution's overseers in the United States to be able to hire her. She was sent to the university's main campus in Pittsburgh for a stint as a visiting professor during this period. Finally, in late 2005, she was hired to a full-time position as a professor at Carnegie Mellon University in Qatar. With this, she became the first and, for more than a decade, the only Qatari faculty member at any of the six American universities in Qatar's Education City.

Meanwhile, in 2011, she helped found the Translation and Interpreting Institute at Hamad Bin Khalifa University, which she led as executive director until 2015. Having left Carnegie Mellon in 2013, in 2016 she became founding dean of the College of Humanities and Social Sciences at Hamad Bin Khalifa University. As a university dean, Malki was the first Qatari with that title at the Education City institutions. As a dean, she worked to found a digital humanities master's program at the university, as well as the only women's studies master's program in Qatar. She continued to serve as dean until 2023.

Malki identifies as a feminist, and her work at the university has included teaching courses on Islamic feminism, as well as post-colonial theory. She also taught courses on writing composition and theories of translation.

In 2012, she co-authored the book Arab Women in Arab News: Old Stereotypes and New Media with David S. Kaufer, Suguru Ishizaki, and Kira Dreher. She is also involved in social media activism through her blog and other platforms, including her efforts to start the #ImHalfQatari hashtag campaign in 2014. Since 2020, she has hosted the podcast "Women of the Middle East."
