= PDRA =

PDRA may refer to:

- Pan-drug resistant Acinetobacter, a type of bacterium
- Participatory disaster risk assessment
- Postdoctoral research assistant
- Postdoctoral Research Award, funded by the Qatar National Research Fund
- Preventable drug-related hospital admission
- Professional Drag Racers Association
- People's Democratic Republic of Algeria
