= Hamad Bin Khalifa University =

Public university in Doha, Qatar

- جامعة حمد بن خليفة
- Established: 2010; 16 years ago
- President: Ahmad M. Hasnah
- Vice-president: Eng. Soud Al Tamimi
- Location: P.O Box 5825, Doha, Qatar; 25.31413°N 51.43234°E
- Campus: Education City
- Nickname: HBKU
- Website: hbku.edu.qa

Hamad Bin Khalifa University (HBKU; Arabic: جامعة حمد بن خليفة) is a public university located within Education City in Doha, the capital city of Qatar. The university, a member of Qatar Foundation, was founded in 2010. The university began graduating students in 2014. It was named after Sheikh Hamad bin Khalifa Al Thani, former Emir of Qatar.

In 2026 Times Higher Education described it as the top-ranked university in the Arab world.

== History ==
Hamad Bin Khalifa University was established by Qatar Foundation (QF) in 2010 as a postgraduate-focused research university. In 2013, the University's programme expanded to include additional postgraduate education, including an executive master's programme in Energy and Resources and a master's programme in Library and Information Studies. In 2015, the university introduced a graduate law school offering a Juris Doctor programme, as well as three research institutes: the Qatar Biomedical Research Institute, the Qatar Computing Research Institute and the Qatar Environment and Energy Research Institute. All of these institutes became part of the university during the same year. A year later, the College of Science and Engineering (CSE) added master's degrees in cybersecurity and data science and engineering, as well as a PhD in computer science and engineering, to its programme. In 2018, HBKU set up its Innovation Centre, which offers funding to students, researchers and scientists to test new ideas and their commercial potential within the industry. In 2026 CSE added a Bachelor of Science in Artificial Intelligence and Data Engineering, as well as a Master of Science in Integrated Circuits and Intelligent Systems Design to its programmes. The College of Public Policy was established in 2019. It initially offered a Master of Public Policy, enabling students to specialise in either social policy or energy and environmental policy.

Recently HBKU added two schools to the academic portfolio. The School of Economics and Management (SEM) was established in the 2025–2026 academic year, offering a Master of Science in Economics programme. The following academic year, HBKU launched the School of Education, bringing its academic structure to six colleges and two schools .

On 9 October 2016, the university's Board of Trustees, approved a ten-year strategic plan, as well as institutional policies and procedures, which was subsequently replaced by a new five-year plan for the period 2025–2030. According to the plan, the university aims to improve research procedures and strengthen partnerships.

== Academics ==
University rankings

Global – Overall
- QS World: =213 (2027)
- THE World: =126 (2027)
- USNWR Global: 487 (2026–27)

Hamad Bin Khalifa University and its programs were recognized by the Ministry of Education and Higher Education in Qatar under decree number 34 for year 2017. The university's graduate program focuses include information and computing technologies, life sciences, sustainable development, Islamic studies, Islamic finance, middle eastern studies, translation studies, and law.

Since its establishment in 2010, HBKU has expanded to offer 51 educational programmes across six colleges and two schools.

Colleges:

- College of Islamic Studies (CIS)
- College of Humanities and Social Sciences (CHSS)
- College of Science and Engineering (CSE)
- College of Law (CL)
- College of Health and Life Sciences (CHLS)
- College of Public Policy (CPP)

Schools:

- School of Education
- School of Economics and Management (SEM)

Each college offers several degree programs. For example, The College of Islamic Studies offers specialized graduate degrees including an MA in Counseling Psychology, an MA in Applied Islamic Ethics, an MS in Islamic Finance, and a PhD in Islamic Studies. It also offers a Graduate Certificate in Islamic Psychology and Psychotherapy.

The College of Humanities and Social Sciences was established in 2016 on the foundations of HBKU's Translating and Interpreting Institute. Amal Mohammed Al-Malki was appointed as its founding dean. Initially, the college offered two postgraduate programmes: Translation Studies and Audiovisual Translation.

In November 2018, HBKU partnered with edX to offer interdisciplinary online courses to students around the world. The first professional certificate offered on the platform was Solar Energy in Hot Desert Climates, which began in January 2019. Since then, courses have been added in fields including renewable energy, healthcare, sustainability, and social science.

HBKU launched additional undergraduate engineering programmes through its College of Science and Engineering for the 2024-2025 academic year. These programmes are intended for students who had originally applied to Texas A&M University in Qatar, which is set to close by 2028. Furthermore, HBKU created new positions for the new courses, offering former Texas A&M faculty members the opportunity to transition to roles at HBKU.

The Qur'anic Botanic Garden, which was inaugurated in 2008, is a member of HBKU. The garden undertakes activities related to botanical conservation and environmental education, including the preservation of plants mentioned in Islamic religious texts.

In collaboration with the Geneva Graduate Institute, HBKU's CPP runs executive programmes in Development Policies and Practices, as well as in Conflict and Fragility Management. These programmes offer teaching and practical learning activities in both Doha and Geneva.

In January 2024, HBKU and Huawei inaugurated the Huawei HBKU AI ICT Academy Lab. The Lab offers training programmes, workshops and certification courses in artificial intelligence and information and communications technology. Huawei provides comprehensive support through its expertise in these fields. This includes curriculum development, training materials and access to resources.

== Rankings ==
In the Times Higher Education World University Rankings 2027, Hamad Bin Khalifa University was placed 126th globally; Times Higher Education described it as the top-ranked university in the Arab world. It was ranked 213th in the QS World University Rankings 2027 and 487th in the U.S. News & World Report Best Global Universities 2026–2027.

== Research ==
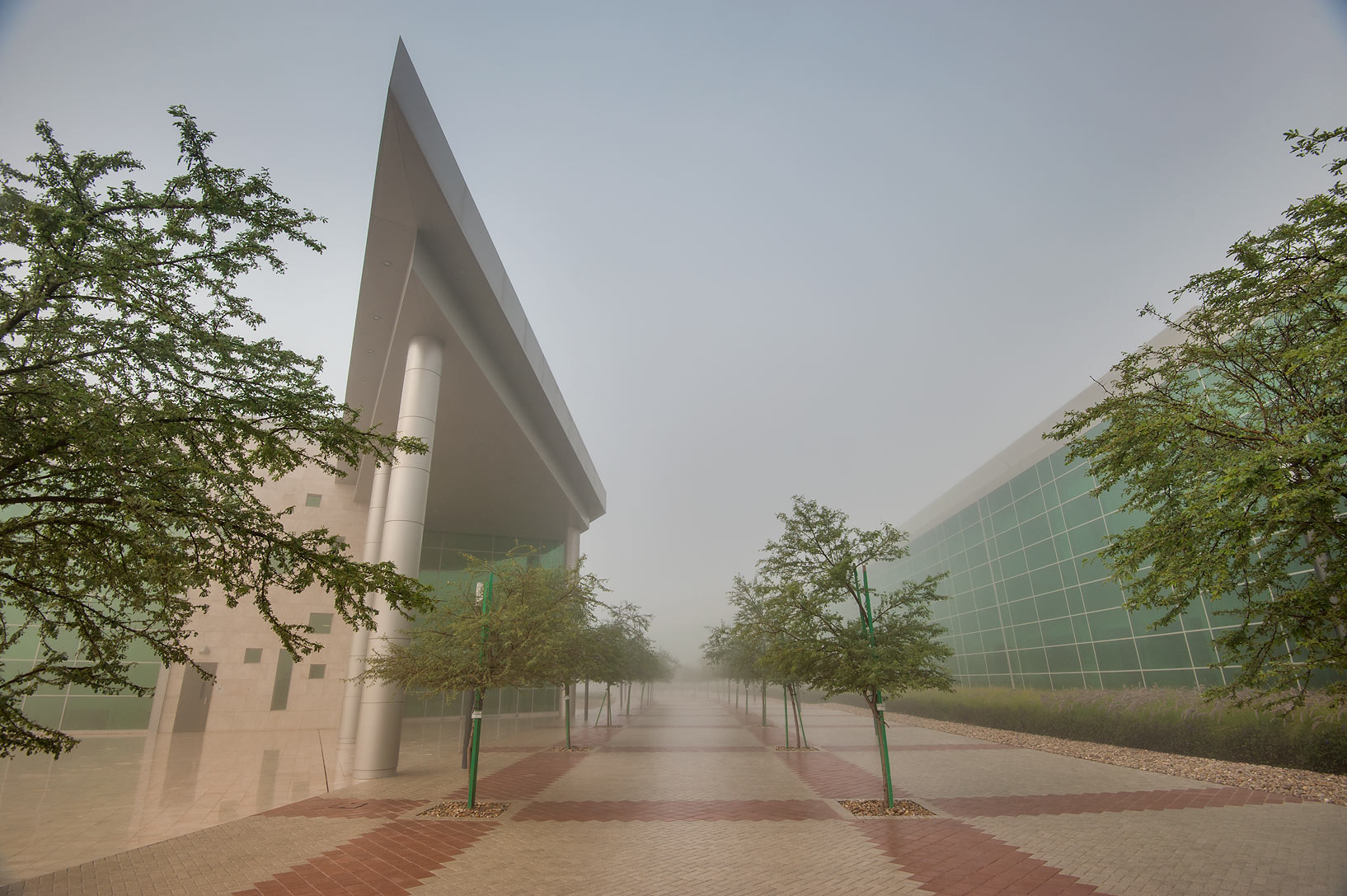
Plaza of HBKU Research Center

HBKU has the following three national research institutes:

- Qatar Environment and Energy Research Institute (QEERI)
- Qatar Biomedical Research Institute (QBRI)
- Qatar Computing Research Institute (QCRI).

It is also home to the Global Institute for Strategic Research, a multidisciplinary think tank that was inaugurated in October 2023. The institute focuses on challenges related to global governance, development, peace and security.

Through the Core Labs programme, HBKU operates three specialised research laboratories: the Materials Characterisation Lab, the Proteomics Core Lab, and the Genomics Core Lab. Each lab offers training opportunities in the form of internships, lectures and group meetings. The Materials Characterisation Lab provides training in characterisation techniques, including optical and electron microscopy, spectroscopy, and more. The Proteomics Core Lab programme focuses on advanced protein and autoantibody biomarker research training. The Genomics Lab internship utilises next-generation sequencing technology.

In December 2024, QCRI launched an Arabic-language generative AI platform called Fanar, which was developed in collaboration with the Ministry of Communications and Information Technology in Qatar. The following year, Fanar was upgraded to version 2.0.

The Qatar Environment and Energy Research Institute (QEERI) addresses challenges relating to energy, water and the environment in Qatar and other arid regions. Since 2018, QEERI established a Solar Consortium to evaluate solar energy technologies in desert conditions. The Institute operates a 35,000 square metres (380,000 sq ft) outdoor test facility equipped with solar technologies and systems that track photovoltaic performance and the impact of environmental exposure on solar equipment. The Photovoltaic Reliability Lab provides testing of modules and simulates outdoor degradation conditions.

== HBKU Press ==
Hamad Bin Khalifa University Press (HBKU Press) is the university publishing house, and offers educational books for schools, academic books for universities and researchers, and information and reference titles that can be accessed online.

HBKU Press has published more than 90 books and houses QScience, an online research and academic platform.

== Student body ==
As of 2025, HBKU reported having 1,187 students from 77 different nationalities.

== Student life ==
Student life includes a variety of extracurricular organisations, giving students the opportunity for cultural exchange, community engagement and professional development. The offers include the International Students Club, Arabic Debating Club, volunteer groups, engineering student societies and more.

HBKU participates in sporting competitions organised by the Qatar Collegiate Sports Federation. In the 2025–26 University Basketball Championship, HBKU finished third in the men's competition and second in the women's.

The University offers PhD students to participate in the Three Minute Thesis (3MT) competitions, in which researchers from different institutes present their work to audiences in three minutes. In November 2025, HBKU hosted the inaugural Middle East and North Africa regional 3MT competition.

== Education City ==
Located in Education City, these institutions include Carnegie Mellon University in Qatar; Georgetown University Qatar; HEC Paris in Qatar; Northwestern University in Qatar; Texas A&M University at Qatar; Virginia Commonwealth University School of the Arts in Qatar; and Weill Cornell Medical – Qatar.

== Buildings ==
- College of Islamic Studies building
  - Education City Mosque
- Liberal Arts & Sciences building
- HBKU Research Complex
- HBKU Headquarters
- HBKU Housing and Residence Halls

In March 2015, the Qatar Faculty of Islamic Studies moved into a new building. The facility includes the Education City Mosque, classrooms and a library.

The Multaqa, also known as the HBKU Student Centre, was designed by Ricardo Legorreta and his team. The 34,000 square metres (370,000 sq ft) building incorporates design elements inspired by traditional Middle Eastern souks, including winding interior passages and decorative plazas.

The student housing complex is divided into two sites, one for females and one for males. The female site is located in Shamali Village and the male site is located in Janoubi Village. A total of 76,000 square metres (820,000 sq ft) of housing is provided, with capacity for 1,200 students.

== Notable alumni ==
- Sheikha Mozah Bint Nasser Al Missned (Class of 2015)

== Notable faculty ==
- Amal Al-Malki, first Qatari dean at an Education City university
- Aisha Yousef al-Mannai, one of Qatar's first female parliamentarians
- Damilola Sunday Olawuyi, UNESCO Chair on Environmental Law and Sustainable Development

== See also ==
- List of universities and colleges in Qatar
