= Ahmed K. Elmagarmid =

Qatari computer scientist

- Born: Libya
- Citizenship: Qatari
- Education: Ohio State University
- Known for: Database research
- Awards: Presidential Young Investigator Award, IEEE Fellow, ACM Fellow, AAAS Fellow
- Scientific career
- Fields: Computer science
- Workplaces: Qatar Computing Research Institute, Purdue University, Hewlett-Packard, Pennsylvania State University

Dr Ahmed K. Elmagarmid (born 1954) is a Libyan-born Qatari computer scientist, academic and executive. He is the founding executive director of Qatar Computing Research Institute, a national research institute under Hamad bin Khalifa University, a member of the Qatar Foundation for Education, Science and Community Development. Since his appointment in 2010, Elmagarmid has focused on large-scale computing challenges that address national priorities for growth and development of Qatar. The computer research community, especially the database research recognizes the important role he has played at international level by creating data-centric research institution like QCRI and building it into an internationally reputed research institute.

At QCRI, Elmagarmid started the Qatar Computing Research Institute-CSAIL research collaboration with MIT in 2012 with the objective of exchange of expertise between QCRI and MIT-CSAIL scientists and joint knowledge creation. Building up on the Artificial Intelligence (AI) expertise developed through this QCRI-CSAIL collaboration and various other AI projects at QCRI, he started a new center for AI within the institute. Under Elmagarmid's oversight and leadership, the Qatar Center for AI (QCAI) has produced a blueprint for the "National AI Strategy for Qatar". Realizing the potential of AI and data science to impact all aspects of life and society, Elmagarmid has been promoting the transformation of higher education towards more AI/data science based education.

Before joining the Qatar Foundation, Elmagarmid held a number of posts in academia and industry. He was an associate then a full Professor of Computer Science at Purdue University, where he was involved in teaching and research for 22 years, and a director of the Purdue Cyber Center.

He served as a Chief Scientist for Hewlett-Packard's office of Strategy and Technology. He also has worked with or consulted for Telcordia Technologies (formerly known as Bell Communications Research), Bellcore, IBM, CSC, Harris Corporation, D. H. Brown and Associates, MCC, Bell Northern Research, Molecular Design Labs, SOGEI (Italy) and UniSql.

Elmagarmid serves as the Vice Chair of the IT Executive Committee of Sidra Medical and Research Center and is on the board of directors at MEEZA. He is a member of the executive committee of Kasra (formerly MENAPOST) and Qatar National Library. He is a founding member of the Qatar Genome Project Committee as well as the Sidra External Scientific Advisory Council.

He has also authored six books and more than 180 papers, and has run several well-funded research programs.

== Early life and education ==
Ahmed K. Elmagarmid was born in Libya in 1954. He received a bachelor of science in computer science from the University of Dayton in 1977 and an M.S. (1981) and Ph.D. (1985) in computer science from Ohio State University.

== Career ==
He taught at Pennsylvania State University before joining Purdue University in 1988. While at Purdue University, Elmagarmid founded two successful organizations with funding from the Lilly Endowment and the State of Indiana: the Indiana Center for Database Systems (ICDS) and the Cyber Center (CC). He was responsible for the development of ICDS, securing its initial funding and growing it into the largest academic database group in the United States. His second organizational initiative, The Cyber Center at Discovery Park, promotes information technology and cyber infrastructure across the whole of Purdue University. The Cyber Center is the best funded unit in Purdue's history, receiving a grant for $105M grant from National Science Foundation. He also founded and led for 3 years a third research center, the Indiana Telemedicine Incubator.

Elmagarmid was appointed corporate chief scientist for Hewlett-Packard during HP's acquisition of Compaq, reporting to the technology council of HP and to the rest of the executive leadership team on competitive threats, deviations and changes in strategies, divestiture, and possible new acquisitions. He also was in charge of product road maps and web services strategy for the company.

He served as Chief of Data Quality at Telcordia Technologies, working on several key applications, including the 1-800 telephone billing system. At Harris Corporation, Elmagarmid was brought in to ensure the timely completion of a large Harris Commercial System's Southern Company contract for the new XA/21 power control station system.

Between 2006 and 2010, Elmagarmid had served as an advisor to Qatar Foundation to develop a research initiative led by Arab Expatriate Scientists, creating institutes and large-scale projects in various areas of science and technology. He serves as an advisor to the Sidra Medical and Research Center, which is one of the world's most advanced women and children's hospitals.

In 1994, he worked with SOGEI in Italy to establish standards for data quality for the Italian Treasury. He worked as an advisor to the Italian Authority for Public Administration (AIPA), an arm of the Italian Government that audits data quality processes for several government systems. He also worked for Techno Padova, an arm of the Chamber of Commerce in the Veneto region in Italy, and lectured at the University of Padova.

== Professional recognition ==
Elmagarmid is a 1988 recipient of the Presidential Young Investigator Award. Elmagarmid is an IEEE Fellow, an ACM Fellow and as AAAS Fellow. Ohio State University and the University of Dayton have both named him among their distinguished alumni.

Elmagarmid has chaired and served on several program committees and served on several editorial boards. He was the general chair of the 2010 ACM SIGMOD.

== Publications ==
Books

- McIver, William J. and Elmagarmid, A.K. Advances in Digital Government, Kluwer Academic Press, 2002. 978–1402070679.
- Bougettaya, A, Benatallah, B., and A.K., Elmagarmid. Interconnecting Heterogeneous Information Systems, Kluwer Academic Press, 1998. 978–0792382164.
- Elmagarmid, A.K., Rusinkiewics, M., Sheth, A. Management of Heterogeneous and Autonomous Database Systems. Published by Morgan Kaufmann, Oct. 1998, 432 pages. ISBN 978-1-55860-216-8.
- Elmagarmid, A.K., Jiang, H., Helal, A., Joshi, A., and M. Ahmed. Video Data Bases: Issues, Products and Applications. Kluwer Academic Press, March 1997. 978–0792398721.
- Bukhres, O.A. and Elmagarmid, A.K., eds. (1995). Object-Oriented Multidatabase Systems. Prentice Hall Publishing. 978–0131038134.
- Elmagarmid, A.K. (Editor). Database Transaction Models for Advanced Applications. Published by Morgan Kaufmann Press, Mar. 1992, 611 pages. ISBN 978-1-55860-214-4.

Journals

- Axel Heitmuller, Sarah Henderson, Will Warburton, Ahmed Elmagarmid, Alex Pentland and Ara Darzi. Developing public policy to advance the use of Big Data in health care. Health Affairs, September 2014. 33:1523-1530.
