= Suad Amiry =

Palestinian author and architect

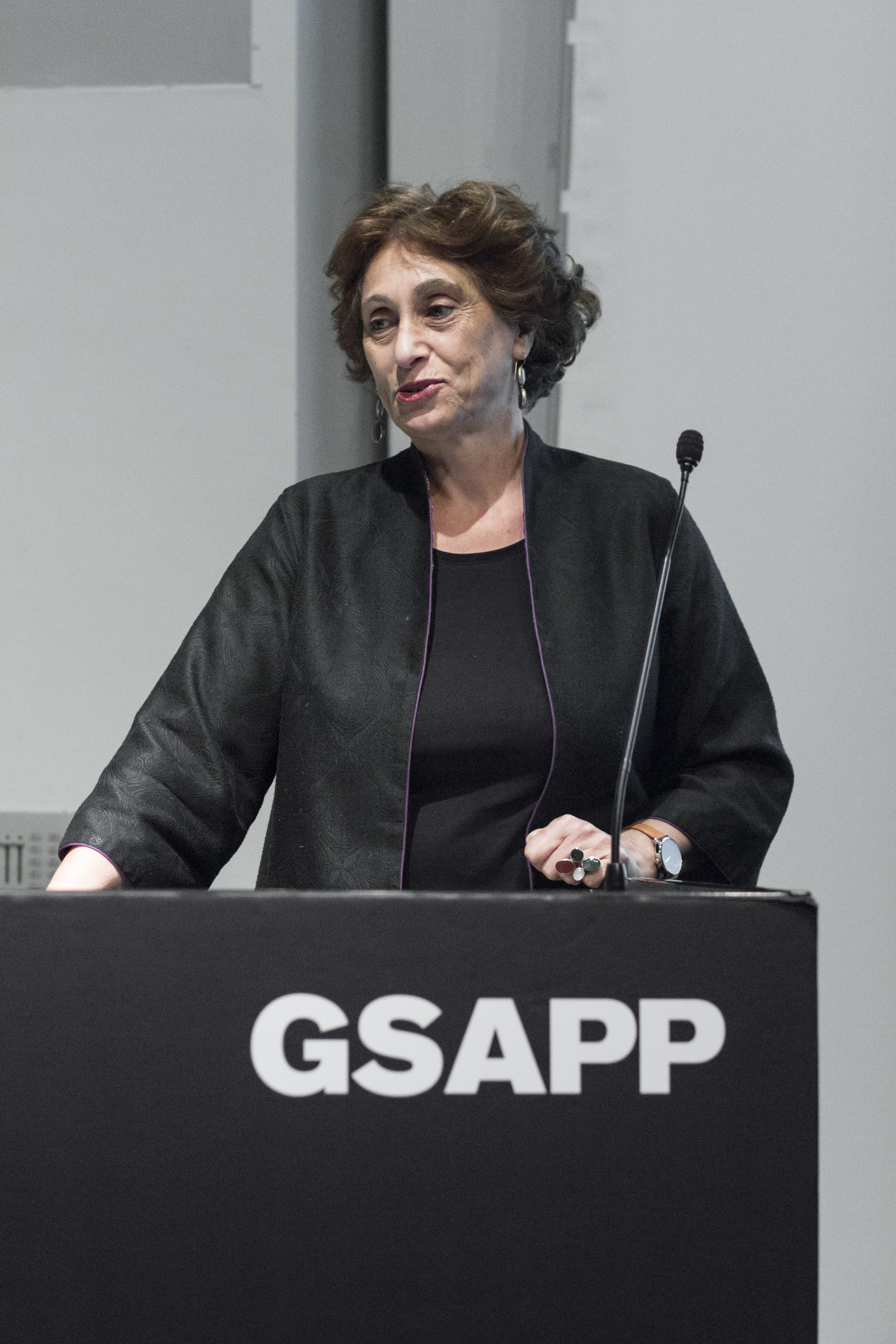
- Born: 1951 (age 74–75); West Bank, Ramallah
- Occupation: Architect

Suad Amiry (Arabic: سعاد العامري) (born 1951) is a Palestinian author and architect living in Ramallah.

== Education ==
Her parents moved from Palestine to Amman, Jordan. She was brought up there and went to Lebanon's capital of Beirut to study architecture. She studied architecture at the American University of Beirut, the University of Michigan, and the University of Edinburgh, Scotland.

== Career ==
Amiry was a member of the staff at Birzeit University until 1991, when she left to lead the Riwaq Centre for Architectural Conservation. Founded in 1991, the center was the first of its kind to work on the rehabilitation and protection of architectural heritage in Palestine.

From 1991 to 1993 Amiry was a member of a Palestinian peace delegation in Washington, D.C.. She is engaged in some major peace initiatives of Palestinian and Israeli women, including serving as Palestinian team coordinator for the Jerusalem program at the Smithsonian Institution's 1993 Folklife Festival.

From 1994 to 1996 she was the Assistant Deputy Minister and Director General of the Palestinian Authority's Ministry of Culture.

Her book Sharon and My Mother-in-Law has been translated into 19 languages, was a bestseller in France, and was awarded in 2004 the prestigious Viareggio Prize in Italy, together with Italo-Israeli Manuela Dviri.

She was appointed as a vice-chairperson of the Board of Trustees of Birzeit University in 2006.

== Riwaq ==
One of Riwaq's first projects was the compilation of a registry of buildings of significant historical value in Palestine. Completed in 2004, it listed 50,000 buildings, around half of which were abandoned. In 2001 Riwaq launched a ten year program of job creation through conservation (tashgheel). Workers were trained in the use of traditional materials and techniques. In 2005 they launched the 50 villages project restoring public spaces and involving villagers in renovating their own properties. Riwaq has also done important work on the so-called "throne villages" (qura al-karasi), the centres of Ottoman tax districts.

== Personal life ==
When she returned to Ramallah as a tourist in 1981, she met Salim Tamari, whom she married later, and stayed.

== Books ==
- Space, Kinship and Gender: The Social Dimension of Peasant Architecture in Palestine. University of Edinburgh Press (1987)
- The Palestinian Village Home. British Museum Press. (1989) with Vera Tamari
- Traditional Floor Tiles in Palestine. Riwaq monograph. (2000)
- Earthquake in April. Institute of Palestine Studies. (2003)
- Sharon and My Mother-in-Law : Ramallah Diaries. Knopf Doubleday Publishing Group (2005)
- Nothing to Lose but Your Life: An 18-Hour Journey with Murad. (Paperback) Bloomsbury Qatar Foundation Publishing (2010)
- Menopausal Palestine: Women at the Edge. Women Unlimited. (2010)
- Golda Slept Here. Hamad Bin Khalifa University Press. (2014)
- My Damascus. Olive Branch Press. (2021 - Italian edition 2017)
- Mother of Strangers: A Novel. Pantheon Books. ISBN 9780593316566 (2022 - Originally published as Storia di un abito inglese e di una mucca ebrea, by Mondadori Libri S.p.A., Milano, in 2020)

== Awards ==
- NPR Books We Love for "Mother of Strangers: A Novel" (2022).
- Aga Khan Award for Architecture for Revitalization of Birzeit Historic Centre with RIWAQ (2013).
