= MEEZA QSTP =

Qatari data centre and IT company

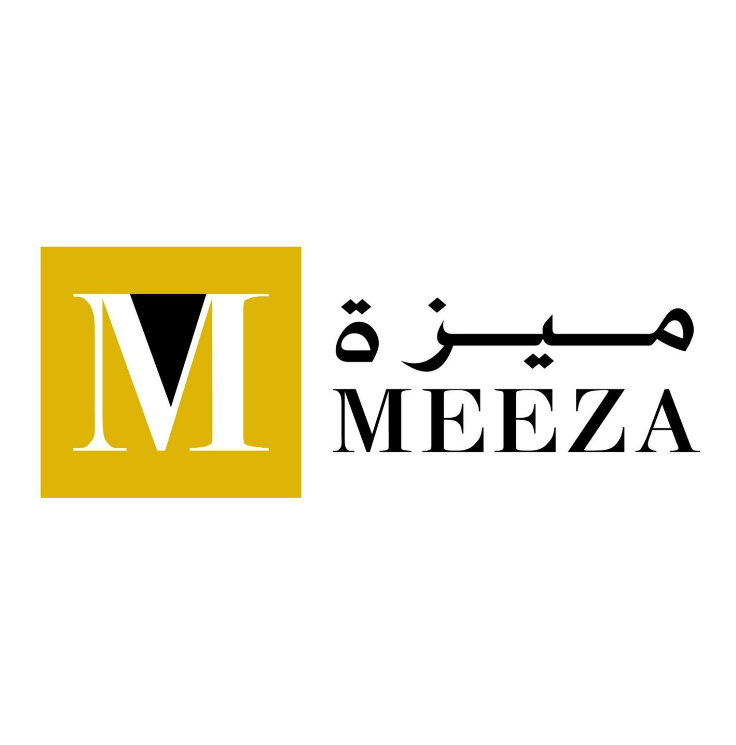
- Company type: Public
- Traded as: QE: MEZA
- Industry: Information Technology (IT)
- Founded: 2008; 15 years ago
- Headquarters: Doha, Qatar
- Website: meeza

MEEZA QSTP (Arabic: ميزة كيو اس تس بي) is an IT provider founded in Qatar Science & Technology Park (QSTP).

The company has five Tier III certified data centres known as M-VAULTs, offering a guaranteed uptime of 99.98% built to comply with the international standards.

MEEZA's provides Data Centre Services, Managed IT services, Cloud Services, and IT Security Services, as well as Smart Cities Solutions and Artificial Intelligence (AI).

MEEZA is a publicly quoted company on Qatar Stock Exchange main market.

== History ==
MEEZA was founded in 2008 as Qatar Foundation joint venture providing Information Technology (IT) services. The name MEEZA was derived from the Arabic word “Advantage”.

MEEZA opened its first data centre M-VAULT in 2009, offering 99.98% availability. In 2012, MEEZA has opened M-VAULT 3 data centre in the second quarter and M-VAULT 2 data centre in the third quarter. The data centres have been designed to Uptime Institute Tier 3 standards, with 99.98% guaranteed availability. In addition, MEEZA was the first company in Qatar to have Security Operations Centre (SOC), enabling to mitigate digital and cybersecurity threats.

In 2021, MEEZA launched its fourth data centre, M-VAULT 4 hosting Microsoft cloud data centre. Later in 2022, MEEZA announced the launch of M-VAULT 5 data centre less than one year after the launch of M-VAULT 4 data centre to meet the increasing demand for data centres and cloud services.

As of 2023, MEEZA is the first company to use the book building exercise for the Initial Public Offering (IPO) in Qatar. MEEZA shares were listed on the Qatar Stock Exchange main market from 23 August 2023.
