= QatarDebate =

QatarDebate Center
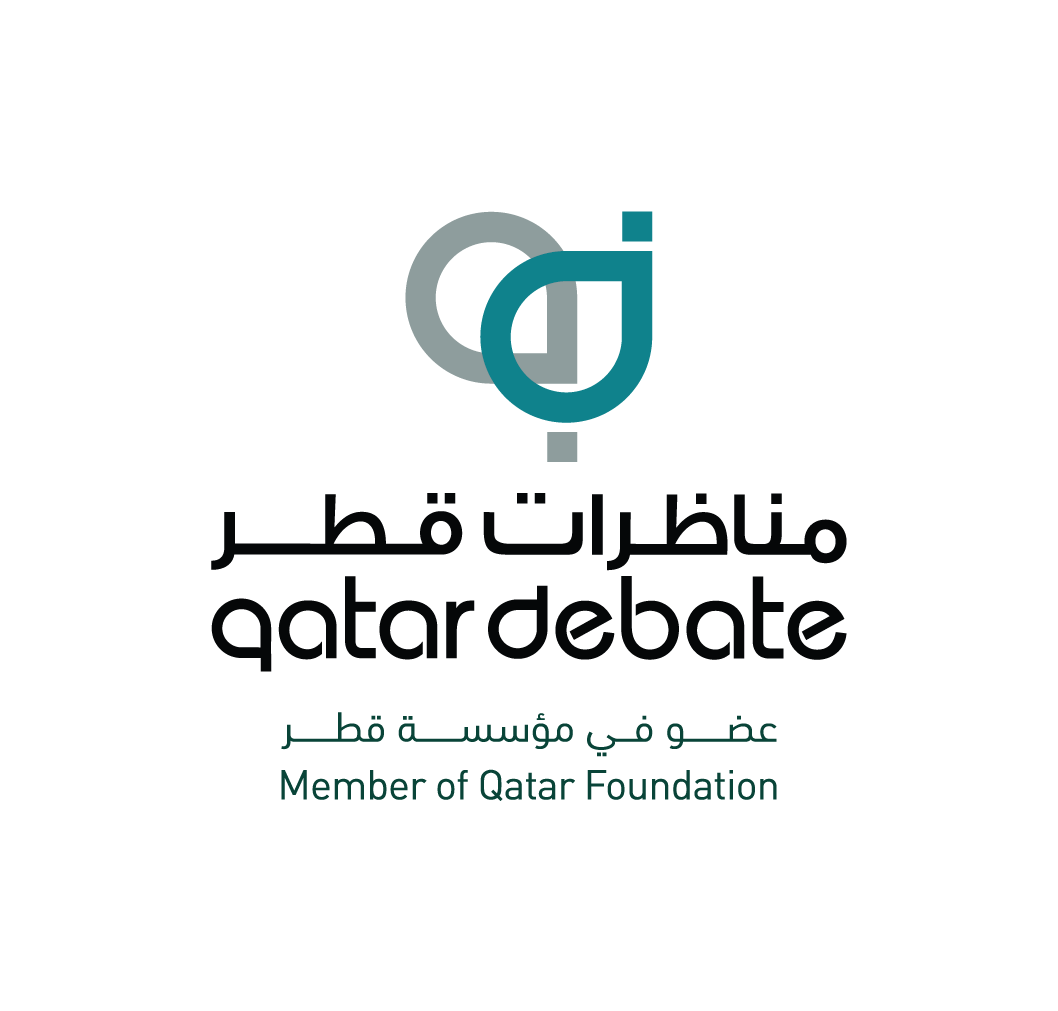
- Formation: 2008
- Founder: Qatar Foundation
- Type: Non-profit organization
- Headquarters: Education City, Doha, Qatar
- Website: QatarDebate.org

QatarDebate, a member of Qatar Foundation and the National Debating Organisation for Qatar, is a civic engagement initiative which aims to develop and support the standard of open discussion and debate among students and youth in Qatar and the broader Arab world.

The centre focuses on using debate as a language learning tool to teach critical thinking, communication, collaboration, creativity and civic awareness. They have launched programmes in different educational institutions. These include the University of Chicago and the Qatar Police College.

== History ==
QatarDebate was established in 2008 under the direction of Moza bint Nasser, chairperson of Qatar Foundation, with support from the team behind the Doha Debates.

QatarDebate's aim is to "shape the global citizens of today and the intellectual leaders of tomorrow in Qatar and the region" through the introduction of a variety of English and Arabic debate programs.

== Programs and activities ==
The center selected and helped coach members of the Qatar National Debate Team for the 2008 and 2009 editions of the World Schools Debating Championships. In both editions, the team won four out of their eight debates. The team equaled Lithuania's record in the 2008 championships for the number of debates won by a team in its inaugural appearance.

In April 2009, two national forums were simultaneously organized by QatarDebate: the Qatar National Schools Debating Championship and Qatar National Universities Debating Championships.

QatarDebate was awarded the rights to host the 2010 World Schools Debating Championships, becoming the first Arab-based society to do so. The event was launched on 9 February 2010 and featured teams from 57 countries.

A biennial event known as the International Universities Arabic Debating Championship is held under the auspices of QatarDebate. The first edition was held in 2011, followed by two more editions in 2013 and 2015. The championship features students from international universities who debate predetermined topics. The 2015 edition, which featured teams from 33 countries, was the first to include universities from non-Arabic countries.

The 4th Qatar Universities Debate League (QUDL) in English was held in 2018, with 16 teams participating.

In January 2019, the European Arabic Debating Championship took place in Vienna, Austria. The event, which was hosted by the QatarDebate Centre, was attended by 20 universities from 15 different European countries.

The 3rd U.S. Universities Arabic Debating Championship was held in Doha in October 2022 and hosted 40 teams, with 16 coming from Universities that had not participated before.

The second edition of the Asian Arabic Debating Championship was held in Muscat, Oman in February 2023. The Texas A&M University at Qatar team won the competition which had 165 participants making up 42 teams.

The Al Jazeera Media Institute signed an agreement in May 2023 with the QatarDebate Centre to cooperate on providing services, which will develop young Arabs abilities to debate and criticise. The partnership also provides a learning opportunity for trainers of both institutes. Also that month, the first International Conference on Debate and Dialogue was held in Doha. The QatarDebate Centre organized the event with additional support from the Qatar Foundation. In June 2023, a Memorandum of Understanding (MoU) was signed between the QatarDebate Centre and the University of Utah’s College of Humanities to promote the Arabic language in the U.S. The 6th International Schools Debating Championship (ISDC) was held in September 2023 in the QatarDebate Centre. In December 2023, the ‘Oasis of Dialogue’ series which is organized by the QatarDebate Centre and the Al Jazeer Media Institute, held the eighth session entitled “Human Rights Advocacy in Time of War”.

== Films ==
QatarDebate was involved in the filming of a documentary film on the first Qatar National Schools Debating Team (2008) entitled “Team Qatar”, directed by Liz Mermin, which won an award at the 2009 Doha Tribeca Film Festival. The center also produced an instructional film on debating for use by members of the society, entitled “QatarDebate Introduction to Debating”.

== Publications ==
In 2013, the center released a dictionary with Arabic and English debate terminology. Along with definitions of each term, the book highlights their application in debates by providing examples of their use.

Other publications released by the center include Al Murshed Book and the Introduction to the Art of Debating Book.
