= Manuela Dviri =

Israeli journalist (born 1949)

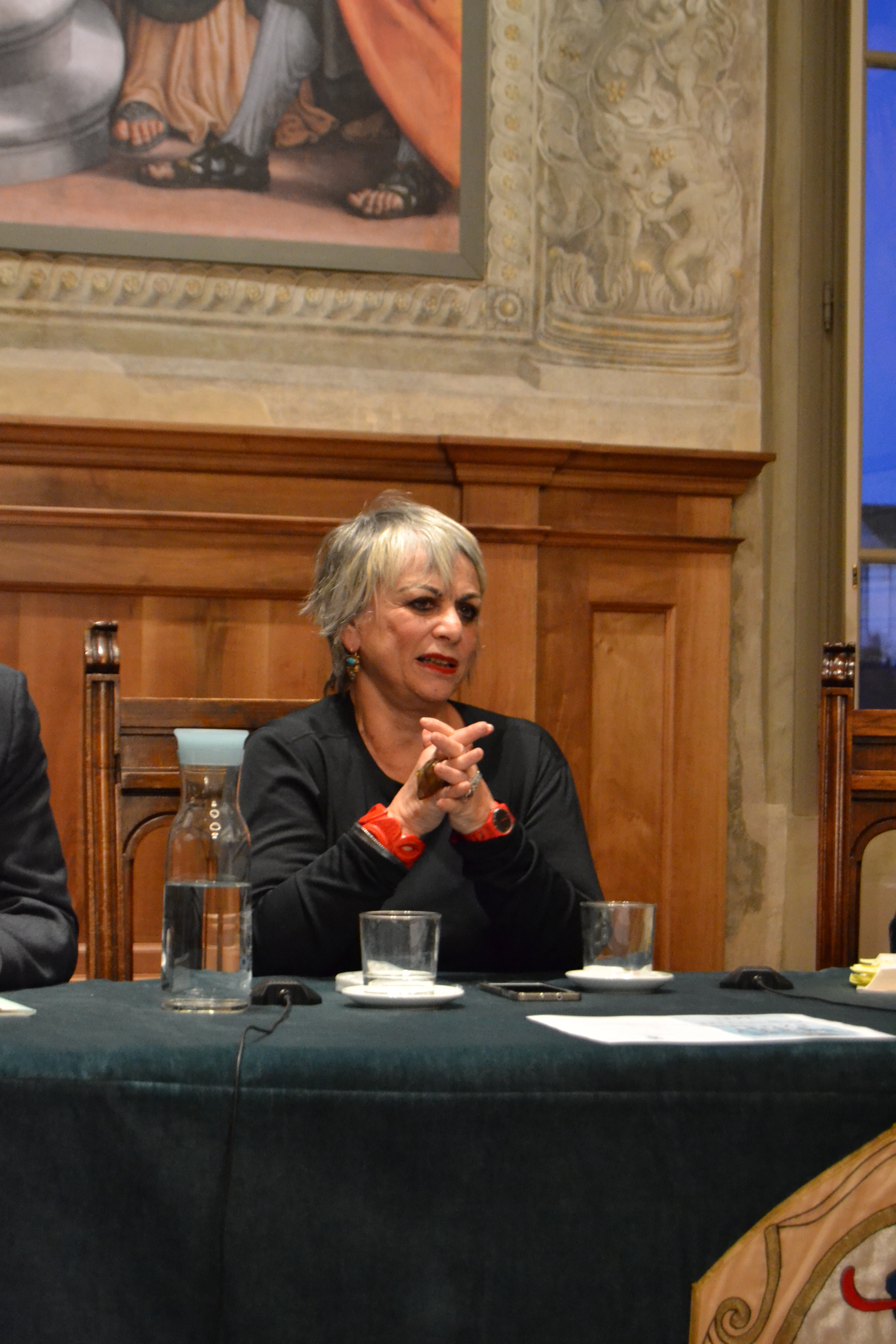
Manuela Dviri

Manuela Dviri Vitali Norsa (Hebrew: מנואלה דבירי ויטלי נורסה; born 1949), is an Italian-Israeli journalist, peace activist and author.

== Biography ==
Born in Padua, Italy, she moved to Israel in 1968 after her marriage with a young Israeli. She graduated in English and French literature and began her professional career as a high school teacher and later in an institute for mentally disabled children. She later worked at the Weizmann Institute of Science in the area of international relations. On 26 February 1998, her 21-year-old son, Jonathan, who was serving in the Israeli Army, was killed during a confrontation with Hezbollah. She has promoted innumerable protest activities and published in some prestigious Israeli journals on the topic. After the Israeli Army withdrew from Lebanon on 25 May 2000, to the UN-agreed Israeli border, she continued her political work as an opinion maker.

== Activism and awards ==
Manuela Dviri is active in different pacifist groups that seek a dialogue between Israelis and Palestinians. She is the author of a book of stories, some poetry collections and a translation of children's books. In 2002, she won The High Quality Award. In 2004, she was awarded the prestigious Viareggio Prize in Italy together with the Palestinian writer Suad Amiry. In 2005, she received the Peres Award for Peace and Reconciliation for her involvement with Saving Children, an Israeli-Palestinian project which refers Palestinian children to Israeli hospitals for free treatment. Her theatre piece Land of milk and honey (Terra di latte e miele), was written in collaboration with Silvano Piccardi, was premiered internationally in 2003 at Paris, France. She was also awarded the Cavaliere dell'Ordine della Stella d'Italia by then Italian President Giorgio Napolitano.

== Works ==
- Chocolate egg (Beitza shel Shokolad), 2000.
- Land of milk and honey (theater piece) 2003.
- La guerra negli occhi: diario da Tel Aviv, Avagliano, Cava de' Tirreni, 2003.
- Vita nella terra di latte e miele, Ponte alle Grazie, Milan, 2004.
- Shalom, Omri. Salam, Ziaad, Sinnos, Roma, 2007.
- Un mondo senza noi, Piemme, Milan, 2015.
- A World Without Us, ServiziCulturali, Italy, 2017.
- Il nonno, Morris e io, (Italian translation of the book by Miryam Chanoch), ServiziCulturali, Italy, 2020.

== Literary and journalistic awards ==
- Journalist Award Corrado Alvaro, 2003
- Journalist Award Menzione Speciale Premio Valitutti, 2003
- Literary Award Premio Viareggio Repaci Internazionale, 2004
- Literary Award Premio Feudo di Maida, 2004
- Literary Award Premio Molinello 2005
- Literary Award Melvin Jones Fellow - Lyons Internazional, 2007

== Prizes for peace ==
- Prize Granarolo “Alta qualità 2002” (Italy)
- Prize “Fumagalli 2003" (Italy)
- Prize “Solidarietà 2004”, Pisa (Italy)
- Prize “Solidarity e Pace 2004“ Cassino (Italy)
- Prize “Sette luglio 1944” Carrara (Italy)
- Prize “Peace and Reconciliation Award” 2005, Peres Center, Tel Aviv (Israel)
- Prize “Al Servizio degli Ultimi 2006” (Italy)
- Cavaliere dell'Ordine della stella della solidarietà italiana - Italian Republic, Roma, 12 gennaio 2007
- Prize Internazionale "Ator Pal Mont" 2013, Udine (Italy)
- Prize "Fondazione Ducci per la Pace" 2014, Roma (Italy)
- Prize Internazionale Semplicemente Donna 2014, Arezzo (Italy)
