= Qatar Computing Research Institute =

Qatar-based nonprofit institute for computing research

Qatar Computing Research Institute معهد قطر لبحوث الحوسبة
- Founded: 2010
- Type: Non-profit
- Location: Doha, Qatar
- Key people: Ahmed K. Elmagarmid (Executive Director)
- Employees: 100+
- Website: Official website

The Qatar Computing Research Institute (QCRI) in Doha, Qatar, is a nonprofit multidisciplinary computing research institute founded by the Qatar Foundation (QF) for Education, Science and Community Development in 2010. It is primarily funded by the Qatar Foundation, a private, non-profit organization that is supporting Qatar on its journey from carbon economy to knowledge economy.

== Background ==
QCRI is one of the three national research institutes under Qatar Foundation and specializes in applied computing research. Its research fall into two main categories: core computing and multidisciplinary computing. Within core computing, QCRI specializes in internet computing (with an emphasis on cloud computing and social networking), data analysis, and advanced computer hardware design. Within multidisciplinary computing, QCRI is focused on Arabic language technologies, high performance computing, and bioinformatics.

QCRI has offices in the HBKU Research Complex, in Doha's Education City. QCRI has a staff of 90+ employees.

== Origins ==
QCRI grew out of a series of meetings held by the Qatari Arab Joint Committee (QAJC) analyzing the needs of Qatar. The group found that Qatar Foundation funded basic computing research at academic institutions worldwide through Qatar National Research Fund (QNRF) and that it incubated the development of new commercial computing products through Qatar Science and Technology Park (QSTP), but it lacked a research organization focused on computing grand challenges that address national priorities for growth and development.

QCRI was established in 2010 with a mandate to tackle large-scale computing challenges relevant to the needs of Qatari stakeholders. The stakeholders include Qatari industry, Qatar's government, and Qatari society. Specifically, QCRI's customers include the petroleum industry, the telecommunications industry, the healthcare industry, and the media industry. QCRI also works closely with both the basic research institutes in Qatar, including the Education City Universities on their most promising basic research findings, also working closely with QSTP to identify the most viable commercial applications of QCRI's research.

== Activities ==
Research topics investigated by the QCRI include Arabic language computer technologies, computer security and data analysis. The Arabic Language Technology Ecosystem Grand Challenge is to have an Arabic Language Technology research community in the Arab world of 100 specialized researchers, research engineers, and developers. The Arabic Machine Translation Grand Challenge hopes to realize machine translation for translating text or speech for 20 languages to and from Arabic. The Arabic Intelligent Support System Grand Challenge is a campaign to provide seamless multimodal Arabic content access and processing in 25% of newly authored software that handle Arabic in the Middle East. The Arabic Automated Language Tutor Grand Challenge assists in Arabic language learning for 1 million students via an interactive Arabic language tutor that teaches literacy, phonics, and grammar. The Seamless Arabic Dialogue System Grand Challenge is to transform 50% of automated commercial customer facing in Qatar to Interactive Voice Response (IVR) systems. The Arabic Content and Search Grand Challenge will try to make Arabic a tier 1 language on the web and in the enterprise in terms content, search, and services.

== Sponsors and partners ==
QCRI's principal sponsor is the Qatar Foundation for Education, Science and Community Development. QCRI conducts research and development in collaboration with various organizations, including Qatari Diar, Aljazeera Network, Microsoft Research, and Yahoo! QCRI also collaborates with other computing research institutes, including MIT, Columbia University, University of Waterloo, and Purdue University.

== Directors ==
The inaugural executive director of QCRI is Ahmed K. Elmagarmid, who was appointed by the executive board of Qatar Foundation in 2010. Its managing director is Abdellatif Saoudi. The QCRI executive director is supported by an executive team consisting of the managing director, a chief scientist and the research directors within the institute. Current and former research directors include Stephan Vogel, Sanjay Chawla, Ashraf Aboulnaga, Ting Yu, Issa Khalil, Natasa Milic-Frayling, Mourad Ouzzani, Ingmar Weber, and Jaideep Srivastava.
