= Aisha Yousef al-Mannai =

Qatari academic and politician

Member of the Shura Council
- In office 2017–

Aisha Bint Yousuf al-Mannai is a Qatari academic and politician. In 2017 she was one of four women appointed to the Shura Council, becoming one of the country's first female parliamentarians.

== Biography ==
Al-Mannai earned bachelor degrees in education and Sharia at Qatar University, before studying for an MA and PhD at Al-Azhar University in Egypt. She subsequently became a professor at the College of Sharia and Islamic Studies at Qatar University, later becoming the college's dean, the first woman to become dean of a College of Sharia. She later became manager of the Muhammad Bin Hamad Al-Thani Center for Muslim Contributions to Civilization at Hamad Bin Khalifa University. She also volunteered with the Qatar Red Crescent Society, becoming its deputy chair, and served as a member of the Arab Parliament.

In November 2017 al-Mannai was appointed to the Shura Council by Emir Tamim bin Hamad Al Thani.
