= Michael Trick =

American professor of operations research

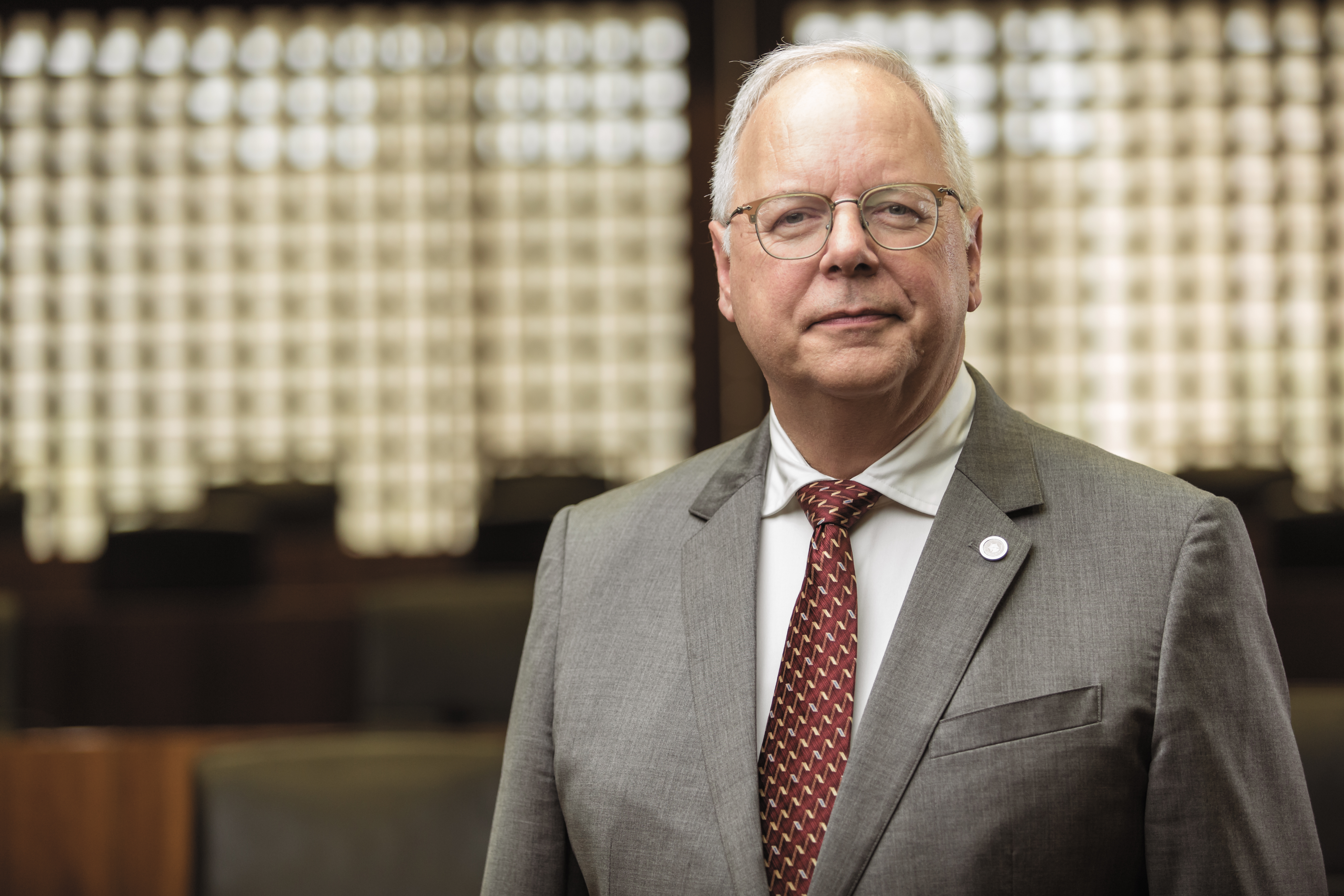
- Michael Trick (Dean, Carnegie Mellon University in Qatar) in 2019
- Occupations: operations researcher, academic staff

Academic background
- Education: Georgia Institute of Technology

Academic work
- Institutions: Tepper School of Business at Carnegie Mellon University and Carnegie Mellon University in Qatar
- Main interests: Combinatorial optimization

Michael Alan Trick is an American operations researcher and academic who studies combinatorial optimization, and is known for his work on sports scheduling, transportation scheduling, and social choice. He is the Harry B. and James H. Higgins Professor of Operations Research in the Tepper School of Business at Carnegie Mellon University (CMU), and dean of Carnegie Mellon University in Qatar.

== Early years and education ==
Trick earned a bachelor's degree in combinatorics and optimization and computer science from the University of Waterloo in 1982, a master's degree in operations research from the Georgia Institute of Technology (Georgia Tech) in 1984, and a PhD in industrial and systems engineering from Georgia Tech in 1987. His dissertation, Networks with Additional Structured Constraints, was jointly supervised by John Bartholdi and H. Donald Ratliff.

== Career ==
After postdoctoral research at the Institute for Mathematics and its Applications in Minneapolis and the Institut für Ökonometrie und Operations Research at the University of Bonn, he joined the CMU faculty in 1989. He became the Bosch Professor of Operations Research in 2003, and the Higgins Professor in 2012.

Trick founded the online operations research news site, INFORMS Online, in 1995. He was president of INFORMS in 2002. In 2006, he was elected as a fellow of INFORMS.

== Recognition ==
He won the George E. Kimball Medal of INFORMS in 2009.
