= Hamad Bin Khalifa University Press =

- Parent company: Hamad Bin Khalifa University
- Founded: 2010
- Successor: ISER Books
- Country of origin: Qatar
- Official website: hbkupress.com

Hamad Bin Khalifa University Press (HBKU Press) is a publishing house based in Doha, Qatar. The press was initially managed by Bloomsbury Publishing PLC and was founded as Bloomsbury Qatar Foundation Publishing (BQFP) in 2008 until its transition into HBKU Press in 2015. HBKU Press is part of Hamad Bin Khalifa University which is under the wider community of Qatar Foundation for Education, Science and Community Development. It publishes titles that serve both an international audience as well as the larger Arab community publishing fiction, non-fiction, young adult and children's literature, and academic titles. They highlight local Middle Eastern and Qatari narratives and also translate books from other foreign languages into Arabic.

== History ==
HBKU Press was established in October 2008 as Bloomsbury Qatar Foundation Publishing and headquartered in Doha as part of a partnership between Bloomsbury Publishing PLC and Qatar Foundation. BQFP was Qatar's first publishing house. The partnership ended in December 2015 and BQFP transitioned into HBKU Press.

== Focus on Qatar and the Persian Gulf ==
=== Qatari authors ===
HBKU Press seeks to highlight the narratives and publish the work of local Qatari authors. As BQFP, the company published Qatari Voices, a collection of essays by young Qataris.

=== QScience ===
QScience.com is HBKU Press's online, peer-reviewed, Open Access scholarly publishing platform. Journals published on QScience include Journal of Information Studies & Technology, Rule of Law and Anti-Corruption Journal, QScience Connect, Qatar Medical Journal, and the Journal of Emergency Medicine, Trauma and Acute Care. QScience aims to make research more accessible and understandable to the general public. It was first launched in December 2010 and at the time contained more than fifteen specialized and multidisciplinary journals. QScience published an overall 980 online research papers in 2013 of which 23% pertained to the field of health.

=== Non-fiction ===
As a contributing member of the Qatar Foundation community and its academic institutions, HBKU Press publishes academic titles that help promote the work of local Persian Gulf academics and that are representative of the political climate and history of the Persian Gulf region, as well as works that provide insight to local perspectives on social issues.

Most recently in 2018, HBKU Press published The Gulf Crisis: The View from Qatar edited by Professor Rory Miller. The book provides insider accounts from fifteen Doha-based scholars of the ways that the 2017 blockade on Qatar by Saudi Arabia, the United Arab Emirates, Bahrain and Egypt has influenced Qatar's economy, politics and society, how it has impacted on regional and international diplomatic, security and strategic relations, and how it has been covered in traditional and social media outlets.

Other notable works of non-fiction published by HBKU Press include the academic book Gulf Women, a collection of essays that provides a greater understanding of the history of the Persian Gulf and the Arab world, as well as the history of Muslim women, and The Qatari Press in the Digital Age, which explores the impact of digital journalism on daily newspapers in Qatar.

Children's non-fiction educational books include Qatar Nature Explorer by Frances Gillespie and the pre-reading series teaching words common to culture in Arab states of the Persian Gulf and the local environment: Silsilat Min Beati (My Environment Series) and Silsilat Rehlat Hayat (Life Cycle Series).

=== Commissioned books ===
HBKU Press also works on commissioned projects on behalf of Qatari institutions and clients who create books to serve the local or regional community. Examples include multiple projects with Msheireb Downtown Doha, most notably their volumes titled Gulf Sustainable Urbanism, a joint effort with Harvard University.

== Translations ==
HBKU Press is known for their contribution to translated works, especially the translations of foreign language titles to Arabic, and Arabic language titles to English. However, in recent years, HBKU Press has expanded the breadth of translated work beyond the Arabic/ English and translations have now become a regular part of HBKU Press's publishing mandate. They translate from English, Turkish, Chinese, Malayalam, Greek, French, Spanish, German, Catalan and Russian, into Arabic. Additionally, their original language works in English and Arabic have been translated into Portuguese, Czech, Slovak, Persian, and Norwegian.

Under its BQFP identity, the company participated in the Annual Translation Conference. The first conference was held May 2010, in partnership with Carnegie Mellon University in Qatar and moderated by best-selling novelist Ahdaf Soueif.

HBKU Press has been aligning with a Qatari initiative run by the Ministry of Culture and Sports called the Year of Culture in which the Ministry chooses a country to exchange cultural displays with for the year. HBKU Press gets involved by visiting the guest nation and establishing publishing agreements with the country's local publishers.

In 2018, the guest nation for the Year of Culture was Russia. HBKU Press translated Short Stories and Novels by Alexander Pushkin from Russian to Arabic.

HBKU Press has translated books into Arabic, including the complete works of 2017 Nobel Prize in Literature winner Kazuo Ishiguro, and the complete works of Afghani-American author Khaled Hosseini.

== Book fairs ==
HBKU Press has participated in the annual Doha International Book Fair since the press's inception. They also participate in book fairs around the world including the London Book Fair, Paris Book Fair - Livre Paris, Frankfurter Buchmesse, New Delhi World Book Fair, Amman International Bookfair, Kuwait International Book Fair, Beirut International Arab Book Fair, and the Muscat International Book Fair.

== Awards ==
HBKU Press is the winner of several awards for published works, authors, translators, and illustrators, most notably:

- The 2016 Saif Ghobash Banipal Prize for Arabic Literary Translation for their English translation of The Bamboo Stalk written by Saud Alsanousi and translated by Jonathan Wright
- The 2016 Sheikh Hamad Award for Translation and International Understanding for their Arabic translation of 'Ashar Nissa' by Saleh Almani
- Several categories in the 2018 Purple Dragonfly Book Award for A Recipe for Home by Ghenwa Yehia
- The 2018 International Book Awards in the category of Multicultural Fiction for Bitter Almonds by Lilas Taha
- The 2019 International Book Awards in the category of Children's Mind/Body/Spirit for The Light of Hope by Basma El-Khatib
- The 2019 International Book Awards in the category of Fiction: Multicultural for Bloodstone by Tim Mackintosh-Smith (Also IBA 2019 finalist for the category of Fiction: Historical)
- The 2019 International Book Awards in the category of Children's Novelty & Gift Book for Alphabet City by Omar Khalifa, illustrated by Fabiola Colavecchio (Also IBA 2019 finalist for the category of Children's Educational)
- The 2019 International Book Awards in the category of Home & Garden for Gardening in Arabia: Fruiting Plants in Qatar and the Arabian Gulf by Shuaa Abdullah Al-Sada
- The 2019 Purple Dragonfly Book Award Honorable Mention in the category of Spiritual/Religious for The Light of Hope by Basma El-Khatib
- The 2019 Best Book Awards for Lost in Thyme by Lilas Taha
- The 2019 Sheikh Hamad Award for Translation and International Understanding Third Prize winner in the category of translation from English into Arabic for their translation of The Buried Giant written by Kazuo Ishiguro and translated by Khulud Amr.
