= David S. Kaufer =

American rhetoric scholar

David S. Kaufer is an American rhetoric scholar, currently the Mellon Distinguished Professor of English at Carnegie Mellon University. With Suguru Ishizaki, he has built large-scale digital dictionaries under the name DocuScope to analyze and assess writing that have been used by ETS, RAND, The Folger Library, and the Stanford Literary Lab. DocuScope was also a foundational technology to Classroom Salon, an annotation platform for classrooms that he co-founded with Ananda Gunawardena and Alexander Cheek. Dr. Kaufer also pioneered a relationship with the Carnegie Mellon School of Design where he has held a courtesy appointment.
