= Qatar Foundation =

State-led non-profit organization

- Formation: 1995
- Type: Non-profit organization
- Headquarters: Education City, Doha, Qatar
- Location: Doha, Qatar
- Key people: Hamad bin Khalifa Al Thani (Founder); Moza bint Nasser (Chairperson & Co-Founder); Hind bint Hamad bin Khalifa Al Thani (Vice Chairperson & CEO)
- Website: qf.org.qa

The Qatar Foundation for Education, Science and Community Development (Arabic: مؤسسة قطر) is a state-led non-profit organization in Qatar, founded in 1995 by then-Emir Hamad bin Khalifa Al Thani and his second wife sheikha Moza bint Nasser al-Misnad.

According to the Qatar Foundation, its philanthropic focus is on education, scientific research and community development. It has solicited a number of international universities to establish campuses in Qatar. It has also made commercial investments. The Qatar Foundation's activities have been characterized by critics as influence peddling or lobbying.

== Education and research ==
The Qatar Foundation has established five Qatar Academy branches, the Awsaj Academy for children with learning difficulties, and the Academic Bridge Program, a post-secondary school program. From 2003 to 2013, the Qatar Foundation ran the RAND-Qatar Policy Institute in a partnership with the RAND Corporation.

In higher education, Qatar Foundation established branch campuses of eight international universities and one home-grown university at the main campus just outside Doha:

- 1998 – Virginia Commonwealth University School of the Arts in Qatar.
- 2002 – Weill Cornell Medicine-Qatar opened.
- 2003 – Texas A&M University at Qatar opened. In 2018, Qatar Foundation lawyers filed a lawsuit to block Texas A&M from releasing records about the foundation's donations. In 2024, Texas A&M announced it will close it's campus in Qatar by 2028.
- 2004 – Carnegie Mellon University Qatar opened.
- 2005 – Georgetown University School of Foreign Service in Qatar opened.
- 2008 – Northwestern University in Qatar opened.
- 2010 – Hamad Bin Khalifa University (HBKU) opened.
- 2011 – HEC Paris in Qatar launched the first EMBA in the country.
- 2011 – 2020 University College London Qatar was in operation until October 2020.

The US Education department has investigated Georgetown University, Texas A&M, Cornell and Rutgers over their funding from Qatar.

The foundation sponsors the World Innovation Summit for Education (WISE), which has been held in Doha since 2009.

The majority of the universities on Qatar Foundation's campus run their own research programs, often collaborating with QF's own applied research bodies. QF has partnerships with the Royal Society and the James Baker Institute for Public Policy at Rice University.

Stars of Science, a reality TV show was launched in 2009 in order to discover "young Arab innovators".

The Qatar Foundation has organized the Qatar National Research Fund (QNRF) since 2006, and the Qatar Science & Technology Park (QSTP) since 2009. At an investment of more than $800 million by Qatar Foundation, QSTP became Qatar's first free-trade zone. QF launched the Qatar Computing Research Institute (QCRI) in 2010, the Qatar Green Building Council in 2009, the Qatar Environmental & Energy Research Institute (QEERI), the Qatar Biomedical Research Institute (QBRI) and the Sidra Medical and Research Center (endowed with $7.9 billion). The Qatar Diabetes Association, founded in 1995, became a member of Qatar Foundation in 1999.

The Qatar Foundation has sponsored multiple learning initiatives in the Georgia public school system including K-12 teacher trainings, Arabic textbooks for classrooms, and K-12 educator trips to Qatar.

== Culture and arts ==
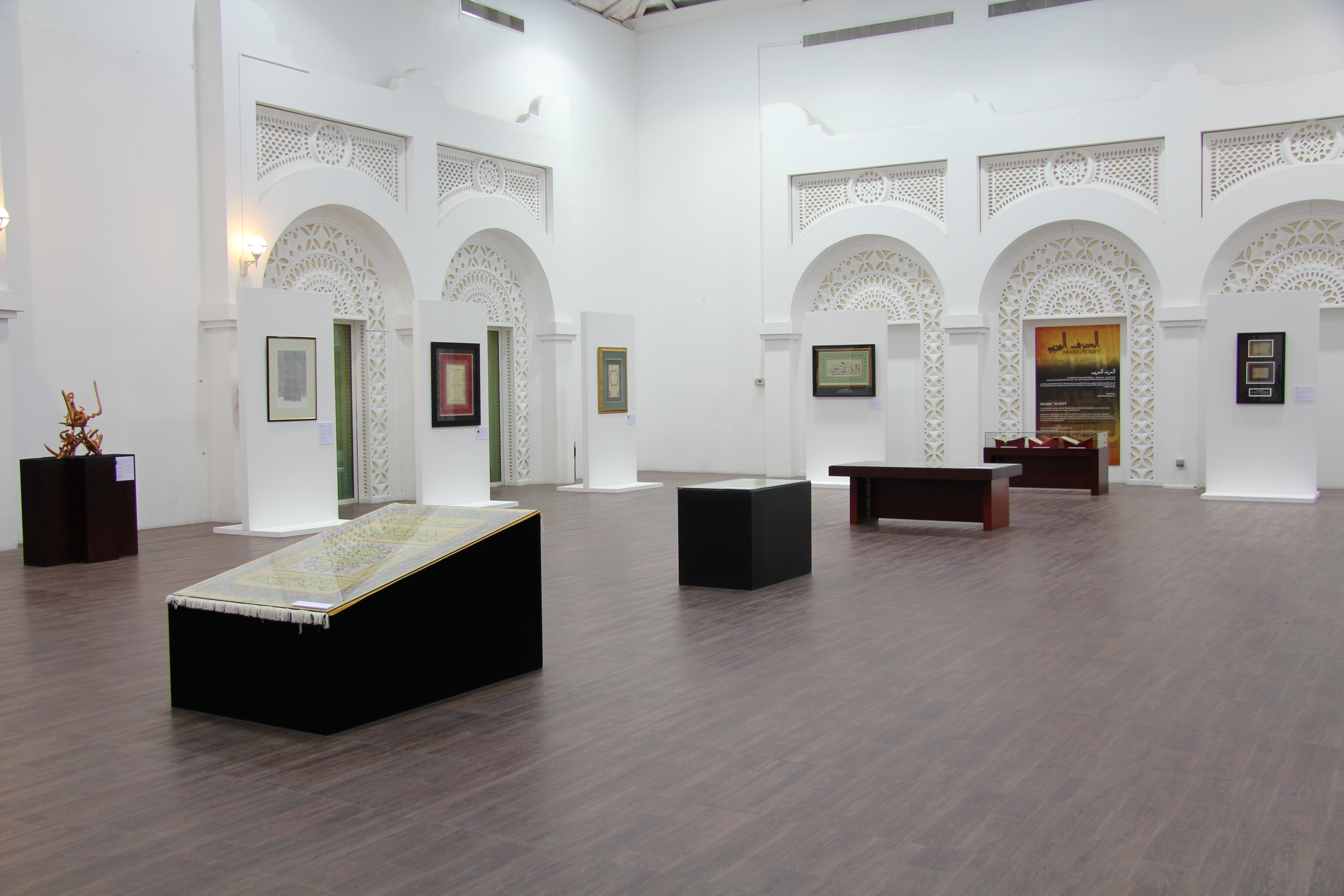
An Arabic calligraphy exhibition hosted by Qatar Foundation in September 2014

Al Shaqab, and the Al Jazeera Children's Channel (JCC) are members of the Qatar Foundation. On November 19, 2012, Moza bint Nasser, chairperson of Qatar Foundation, announced plans for a new national library, Qatar National Library, in Education City. The library hosts the Arab and Islamic Heritage section which contains a historic collection of books, periodicals, manuscripts, maps, and scientific instruments dating back to the 15th century. One of the largest online collections of historic records on the Persian Gulf countries was digitized in October 2014 and made available on the website of the Qatar Digital Library (QDL). The website was the culmination of a partnership established between Qatar Foundation, Qatar National Library, and the British Library in 2012.

The Qatar Foundation has opened the Qatar Philharmonic Orchestra in 2007, and the Mathaf: Arab Museum of Modern Art in 2010. The museum holds one of the largest collections of sculptures and paintings by Arab artists in the world, and has published an online encyclopedia of Arab artists.

Msheireb Properties (a subsidiary of Qatar Foundation) initiated a $5.5 billion commercial development project in Doha in January 2010. Originally called "Heart of Doha", the project was renamed "Msheireb Downtown Doha" in reference to the historical name of the area. The foundation established the Social Development Center in 1996, Reach Out To Asia (ROTA) in 2005, The Doha International Family Institute (DIFI) in 2006, the QatarDebate Center in 2007 and the Qatar National Convention Centre in 2011.

== Joint ventures ==
Joint ventures in the fields of science and research, education and social development are deemed essential to Qatar's transition from an oil-based economy to a knowledge-based economy, as outlined in the Qatar National Vision 2030. Thus, the foundation has set up a number of commercial joint ventures with global partners. Profits generated are shared by both parties, with Qatar Foundation's portion being distributed into its core nonprofit activities.

Vodafone entered in a partnership with QF to launch Vodafone Qatar in 2009. It was granted a fixed telecommunications in September 2008, thereby becoming the second mobile network operator to be licensed in the country.

QF launched MEEZA in 2008, and Qatar Solar Technologies (QSTec) in 2010. In 2008, it launched the Bloomsbury Qatar Foundation Publishing (BQFP), which published books in Arabic and English. It became defunct in 2015 and all of its publications (which included more than 200 books) were incorporated in the newly established HBKU Press, a member of QF. Bloomsbury Qatar Foundation Journals (BQFJ), founded in 2010, was also incorporated in HBKU Press. The website maintained more than fifteen specialized and multidisciplinary journals in 2014.

In December 2011, QSTec announced that it would be constructing a polysilicon production plant in Ras Laffan Industrial City. In August 2017, SolarWorld founder Frank Asbeck and QSTec bought out SolarWorld in a joint venture deal and rebranded it as SolarWorld Industries.

== Sponsorship ==
On 10 December 2010, FC Barcelona announced it had agreed a shirt sponsorship deal worth up to €170 million with Qatar Sports Investments to place Qatar Foundation's name on the front of the team's shirts, ending Barcelona's tradition of not accepting payment for sponsors displayed on its jersey. The deal included a clause allowing a switch in sponsor after the first two seasons, so Qatar Airways took over as the main sponsor in July 2013.

In October 2011, the Wikimedia Foundation announced a plan to work with the Qatar Foundation to support the growth of the Arabic Wikipedia. Later, the media reported that the Wikipedia page for the Qatar Foundation was allegedly edited by a public relations associate of the foundation, for which there was "strong, if circumstantial evidence". It was claimed by Qatar Foundation in November 2015 that the partnership had culminated in the creation of over 6,000 articles on the Arabic Wikipedia.

== Ties with al-Misnad family ==
According to scholarly research, firms belonging to the al-Misnad family, which Chairperson and Co-founder Moza bint Nasser belongs to, "are among the most prominent contractors in the mammoth infrastructural development projects funded by Qatar Foundation". While the research clarifies that there is no way to know the basis on which al-Misnad firms win bids for projects funded by Qatar Foundation, it notes that "there is a widespread assumption in the country (Qatar) that these bids are awarded largely because of the Al Misnad’s family ties to Shaikha Moza".
