= Qatar National Research Fund =

- الصندوق القطري لرعاية البحث العلمي

Agency overview
- Formed: August 2006
- Headquarters: Doha, Qatar
- Motto: Enable research and development excellence in Qatar in order to achieve a knowledge-based economy.
- Employees: 49
- Agency executive: Dr. Abdul Sattar Al-Taie, Executive Director
- Website: www.qnrf.org

Qatar Foundation established Qatar National Research Fund (QNRF) in 2006 as part of its ongoing commitment to establish Qatar as a knowledge-based economy. Qatar Foundation views research as essential to national and regional growth; as the means to diversify the nation’s economy, enhance educational offerings and develop areas that affect the community, such as health and environment.

Qatar National Research Fund aims to foster original, competitively selected research in engineering and technology, physical and life sciences, medicine, humanities, social sciences and the arts. In addition to funding, Qatar National Research Fund aims to encourage dialogue and partnerships

== Funding programs ==
QNRF provides research funding opportunities in the academic, public and private sectors through various funding programs targeting specific research groups. The programs cover basic disciplines emphasized through Qatar National Research Strategy (QNRS): energy and environment, computer science and information and communications technology, health and social sciences, and the arts and humanities.

- National Priorities Research Program (NPRP)
- NPRP - Exceptional Proposals (NPRP-EP)
- TÜBİTAK - QNRF Joint Funding Program
- Osra
- Path Towards Precision Medicine (PPM)
- QNRF-MME Joint Funding
- Rapid Response Call (RRC) to Address COVID-19
- Undergraduate Research Experience Program (UREP)
- Graduate Student Research Award (GSRA)
- Postdoctoral Research Award (PDRA)
- Early Career Researcher Award (ECRA)
- Conference and Workshops Sponsorship Program (CWSP)

== History ==
Qatar National Research Fund (QNRF) was established in 2006 with an aim of fostering research culture in Qatar and launched two grant programs, the Undergraduate Research Experience Program (UREP) and the National Priorities Research Program (NPRP) which were hugely successful. QNRF had awarded $345 million through these programs, with the total number of recipients hailing from more than 60 countries. In 2010, QNRF launched Young Scientists Research Experience Program (YSREP) to provide support to Qatari and expatriate scientists starting a research endeavor independently or within a research team. It was later renamed as Junior Scientists Research Experience Program (JSREP). In 2011, QNRF partnered with Qatar Supreme Council of Education (SEC) and launched Secondary School Research Experience Program that allowed students from Qatar's independent and private secondary schools to carry out research based on the curriculum standards set by the SEC and under the supervision of school teachers. In the later years, QNRF introduced other programs to cover all levels of researchers and research programs.
