= Carnegie Mellon University in Qatar =

University in Qatar

- Front entrance at sunset
- Other name: CMU-Q
- Motto: "My heart is in the work" (Andrew Carnegie)
- Type: Private satellite campus
- Established: 2004; 22 years ago
- Parent institution: Carnegie Mellon University
- President: Farnam Jahanian
- Provost: James Garrett
- Dean: Michael Trick
- Academic staff: 64
- Administrative staff: 90
- Undergraduates: 467 (Fall 2022)
- Location: Doha, Qatar; 25°18′59″N 51°26′20″E
- Campus: Multi-versity Education City, 2,400 acres (9.7 km^{2})
- Colors: Cardinal, Gray, and Tartan Plaid
- Mascot: Scotty the Scottie Dog
- Website: qatar.cmu.edu

Carnegie Mellon University in Qatar (Arabic: جامعة كارنيجي ميلون في قطر) is a satellite campus of Carnegie Mellon University in Education City, Doha, Qatar. This campus is a member of the Qatar Foundation and started graduating students in May 2008. It enrolls over 400 students, has 60 faculty and postdoctoral researchers, and 90 staff members.

== History ==
Carnegie Mellon University's campus in Qatar was established in 2004 as part of a partnership between the university and the Qatar Foundation. This was in line with Qatar's development of an international branch-campus model in Education City. CMU-Q began with an inaugural class of 41 students. Initially offering programmes in business administration and computer science, it later expanded to include biological sciences, information systems. It was the fourth U.S. higher education institution to establish a campus in Qatar. The establishment of the campuses was founded by Sheikha Moza bint Nasser, the mother of Qatar's current Emir Tamim bin Hamad al Thani. Under the terms of the agreement between Carnegie Mellon and the Qatar Foundation, the main campus has been granted full operational control of CMU-Q, including authority over staffing, admissions, and the curriculum. By 2025, CMU-Q had graduated over 1,400 students from its undergraduate degree programmes. The same year CMU-Q and the Qatar Foundation extended their partnership by a further ten years.

Charles E. Thorpe was the campus's first dean, serving from 2004 to 2010. G. Richard Tucker then served on an interim basis, after which Ilker Baybars became the second dean in 2011. Michael Trick succeeded Baybars as dean in September 2017.

== Academics ==
Carnegie Mellon Qatar is part of Education City, a campus on the outskirts of Doha that currently houses eight other university campuses from the United States and Europe. Education City's other institutions include Georgetown University School of Foreign Service, Weill Cornell Medical College, Virginia Commonwealth University, Texas A&M, Northwestern University, HEC Paris, and University College London. The Qatar campus offers a selected range of Carnegie Mellon undergraduate degree programmes. The degree requirements for admission are the same as those for the Pittsburgh campus.

The Doha campus of Carnegie Mellon offers the same degree programs and curricula that students receive at the Pittsburgh campus. Undergraduate degrees are in Artificial Intelligence, Computer Science, Business Administration, Information Systems, and Biological Sciences. Other options include a minors in Tech Entrepreneurship and Multidisciplinary Energy Studies, as well as certificate in AI + Finance. Selected courses incorporate experiential learning, in which students collaborate with external university partners to solve practical problems.

Although CMU-Q's courses are generally taught in English the campus has placed a renewed emphasis on the study of Arabic language and culture. The university has also developed cultural and research projects focusing on Arabic literature, natural language processing and regional dialects.

CMU-Q's MindCraft computer science outreach programme has been operating since 2016. By 2023, it had introduced computing to over 14,000 students in Qatar. The programme has also been expanded to include computer science summer camps for secondary school students.

The Bachelor of Science in Artificial Intelligence is the most recently added programme, launched at CMU-Q in August 2025. According to the Qatar News Agency, it was the first undergraduate programme of its kind in Qatar.

CMU-Q students have the opportunity to cross-register for courses at the other universities within Education City. This allows students to access education that is not offered by CMU-Q itself.

In May 2026, CMU-Q and the QNB Group signed a Memorandum of Understanding to establish the QNB Centre for Business Innovation. The centre is intended to connect academic and professional expertise in areas of business administration, AI and technology.

== Research ==
Research at CMU-Q covers areas such as sustainability, health, technology, artificial intelligence, robotics, economics and genetics. Undergraduates can participate in a variety of research programmes, including the College Honors thesis and the Annual Meeting of the Minds symposium, where students present their research projects to faculty members and external industry judges.

== Finance ==
The campus facilities and upkeep are financed by the Qatar Foundation. Carnegie Mellon also receives subsidies each year to run the campus and pay faculty.

It is estimated that Carnegie Mellon has received between $50 and $60 million per year from the nation of Qatar to operate the Doha campus. Tuition for the school was $49,610 in 2015.

=== Faculty ===
According to the 2024–25 Annual Report, the CMU-Q campus had 59 faculty members. Of these, 25 were in Arts and Sciences, seven in Biological Sciences, 12 in Business Administration, eight in Computer Science, and seven in Information Systems.

The atrium of Carnegie Mellon Qatar with the university motto

== Building ==
Carnegie Mellon Qatar is housed in a building designed by architects Legorreta + Legorreta (currently known as LEGORRETA). The university began occupancy in August 2008. All academics, student affairs, operations, and events are held in the building. The building comprises classrooms, laboratories and lecture halls, which are separated by courtyards. The library, dining area and waiting area are located around the central atrium.

== Gallery ==
The East-West Walkway holding an architecture exhibit

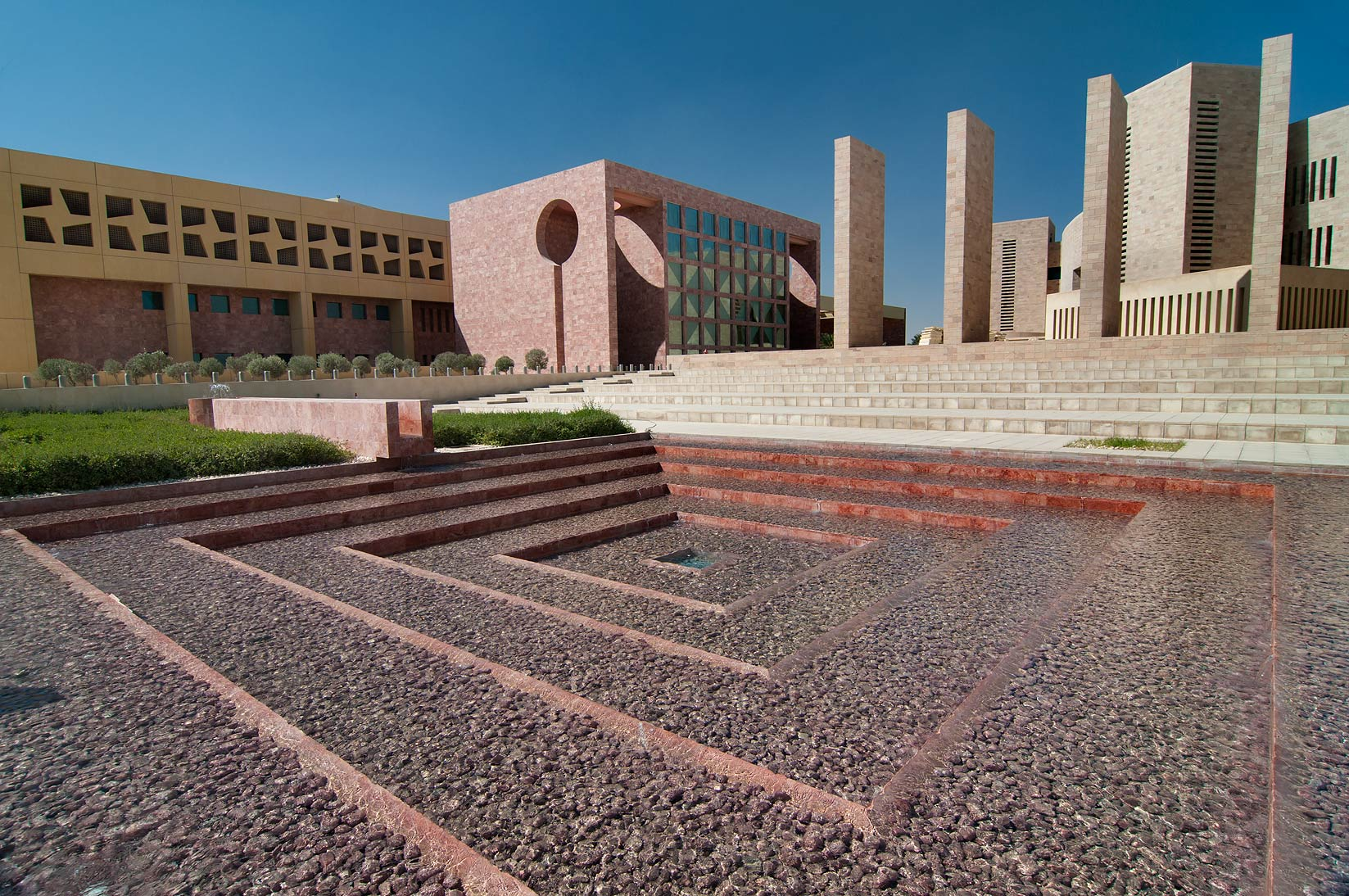
Fountain in backyard of Carnegie Mellon University

== Notable alumni ==
Khadra Ahmed Dualeh, politician and diplomat

== See also ==
- List of universities and colleges in Qatar
