= Qatar =

Country in West Asia

State of Qatar دولة قطر (Arabic) Dawlat Qaṭar
- Flag Emblem
- Motto: الله، الوطن، الأمير; Allāh, al-Waṭan, al-Amir "God, Nation, Emir"
- Anthem: السلام الأميري; As-Salām al-Amīrī "Peace to the Emir"
- Capital and largest city: Doha; 25°18′N 51°31′E
- Official languages: Arabic
- Ethnic groups (2019): 49% Arab; 43% South Asian; 21.8% Indian; 12.5% Bangladeshi; 4.7% Pakistani; 4.35% Sri Lankan; 7% other
- Religion (2020): 65.5% Islam (official); 15.1% Hinduism; 14.2% Christianity; 3.3% Buddhism; 1.9% other
- Demonym: Qatari
- Government: Constitutional monarchy under an authoritarian government
  - Emir: Tamim bin Hamad
  - Deputy Emir: Abdullah bin Hamad
  - Prime Minister: Mohammed bin Abdulrahman
  - Deputy Prime Minister: Saoud bin Abdulrahman
- Legislature: Shura Council

Establishment
  - Qatar National Day: 18 December 1878
  - Declared independence: 1 September 1971
  - Independence from the United Kingdom: 3 September 1971

Area
  - Total: 11,581 km^{2} (4,471 sq mi) (158th)
  - Water (%): negligible

Population
  - 2025 estimate: ▲3,214,609 (134th)
  - 2020 census: 2,846,118
  - Density: 264/km^{2} (683.8/sq mi) (52nd)
- GDP (PPP): 2026 estimate
  - Total: ▼$331.217 billion (60th)
  - Per capita: ▼$103,804 (4th)
- GDP (nominal): 2026 estimate
  - Total: ▼$203.044 billion (54th)
  - Per capita: ▼$63,634 (9th)
- Gini (2017): 35.1 medium inequality
- HDI (2023): ▲0.886 very high (43rd)
- Currency: Qatari riyal (QAR)
- Time zone: UTC+3:00 (AST)
- Calling code: +974
- ISO 3166 code: QA
- Internet TLD: .qa; قطر.

Qatar, (Note: Arabic: قطر, romanised: Qaṭar, pronounced [ˈqɑtˤɑr], local vernacular [ˈɡɪtˤɑr]) (Note: The English pronunciation is commonly /kəˈtɑːr/ kə-TAR or, approximating Arabic, /ˈkɑːtɑːr/ KAH-tar; other variants include /ˈkʌtɑːr, ˈkæ-, -ər/ KUT-ar, KAT-ar, KUT-ər, KAT-ər, /ˈkɑːtər/ KAH-tər, and /kæˈtɑːr, kɑː-/ ka(h)-TAR.) officially the State of Qatar, (Note: Arabic: دولة قطر, romanised: Dawlat Qaṭar, pronounced [ˈdawlat ˈqɑtˤɑr].) is a country in West Asia. It occupies the Qatar Peninsula on the northeastern coast of the Arabian Peninsula in the Middle East; it shares its sole land border with Saudi Arabia to the south, with the rest of its territory surrounded by the Persian Gulf. The Gulf of Bahrain, an inlet of the Persian Gulf, separates Qatar from nearby Bahrain. The capital is Doha, home to over 80% of the country's inhabitants. Most of the land area is made up of flat, low-lying desert.

Qatar has been ruled as a hereditary monarchy by the House of Thani since Mohammed bin Thani signed an agreement with Britain in 1868, which officially recognised its separate status. Following Ottoman rule, Qatar became a British protectorate in 1916 and gained independence in 1971. The current emir is Tamim bin Hamad Al Thani, who, like previous emirs, holds nearly all executive, legislative, and judicial authority in an autocratic manner under the Constitution of Qatar. He appoints the prime minister and cabinet. The Shura Council (also known as the "Consultative Assembly") has a limited ability to block legislation and dismiss ministers, but is fully appointed by the emir, who also has the last say on these decisions. While Qatar held a partial Shura Council election in 2021, with two-thirds of seats elected, in 2024 it moved to abolish those elections altogether, and reverted to a fully appointed Council.

On 21 June 2026, the population of Qatar was 3,180,059, although 3.02 million are foreign expatriates and migrant workers. Its official religion is Islam. The country has the fourth-highest GDP (PPP) per capita in the world and the eleventh-highest GNI per capita (Atlas method). It ranks 42nd in the Human Development Index, the third-highest HDI in the Arab world. It is a high-income economy, backed by the world's third-largest natural gas reserves and oil reserves. Qatar is one of the world's largest exporters of liquefied natural gas and the world's largest emitter of carbon dioxide per capita.

In the 21st century, Qatar emerged as both a non-NATO ally of the United States and a middle power in the Arab world. Its economy has grown rapidly due to its resource-wealth, and its geopolitical power has risen through its media group, Al Jazeera Media Network, and reported financial support for rebel groups during the Arab Spring. Qatar also forms part of the Gulf Cooperation Council.

== Name ==
Pliny the Elder, a Roman writer, documented the earliest account pertaining to the inhabitants of the peninsula around the mid-first century AD; he referred to them as the Catharrei, a designation that may have derived from the name of a prominent local settlement. A century later, Ptolemy produced the first known map to depict the peninsula, referring to it as Catara. The map also referenced a town named "Cadara" to the east of the peninsula. The term "Catara" (inhabitants, Cataraei) was exclusively used until the 18th century, after which "Katara" emerged as the most commonly recognised spelling. Eventually, after several variations—"Katr", "Kattar" and "Guttur"—the modern derivative Qatar was adopted as the country's name.

According to classical linguistic accounts, the term "Qatar" may derive from a type of informal transaction known as muqāṭarah, in which goods were purchased in sealed containers without measuring or weighing the contents, for a fixed price. This practice, also called jazāf, was reportedly widespread in Qatar's markets. Another explanation connects the name to the word qiṭār, meaning camel train, possibly alluding to Qatar's role in historical trade routes.

In Standard Arabic, the name is pronounced [ˈqɑtˤɑr], while in the local dialect, Qatari Arabic, it is [ˈɡɪtˤɑr]. English speakers use different approximate pronunciations as the Arabic pronunciations use sounds not present in English.

== History ==
=== Prehistory ===
Human habitation in Qatar dates back to 50,000 years ago. Settlements and tools dating back to the Stone Age have been unearthed in the peninsula. Mesopotamian artefacts originating from the Ubaid period (c. 6500–3800 BC) have been discovered in abandoned coastal settlements. Al Da'asa, a settlement located on the western coast of Qatar, is the most important Ubaid site in the country and is believed to have accommodated a small seasonal encampment. Some historians have theorised that the Sumerians may have originated from this region.

=== Antiquity ===
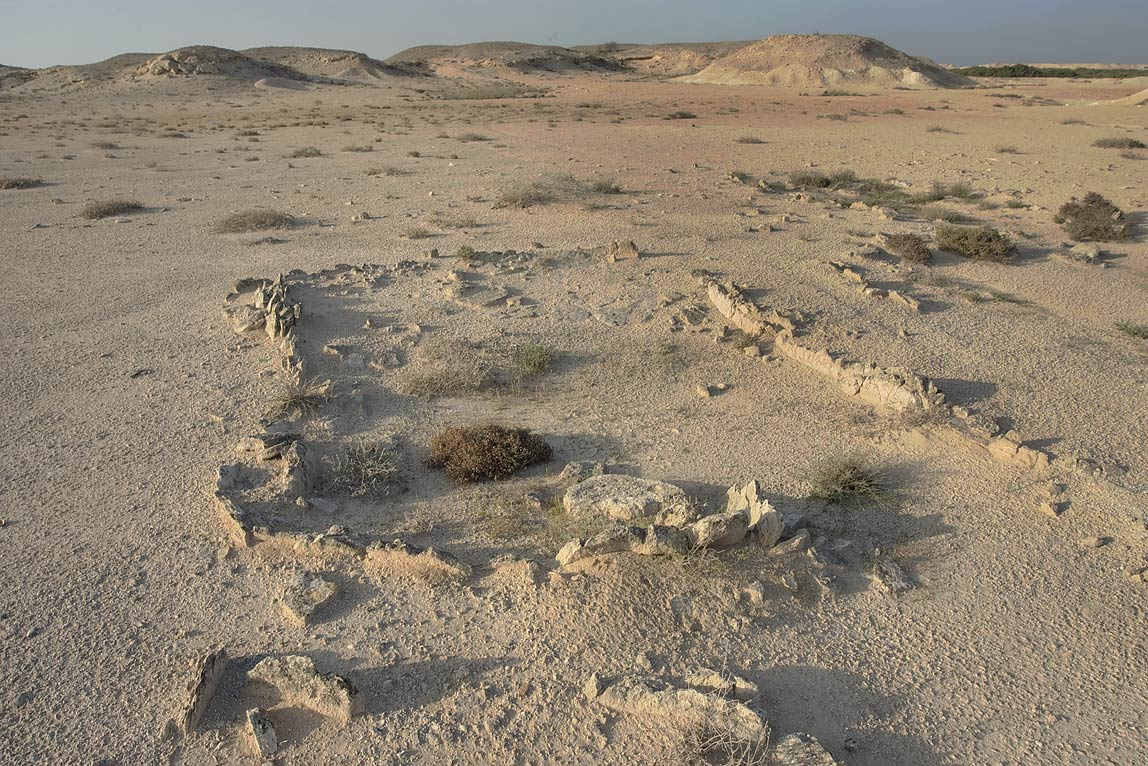
Excavation of a Kassite dye site on Al Khor Island

Kassite Babylonian material dating back to the second millennium BC found on the Al Khor Islands attests to trade relations between the inhabitants of Qatar and the Kassites in modern-day Bahrain. Among the findings were crushed snail shells and Kassite potsherds. It has been suggested that Qatar is the earliest known site of shellfish dye production, owing to a Kassite purple dye industry which existed on the coast.

In AD 224, the Sasanian Empire gained control over the territories surrounding the Persian Gulf. Qatar played a role in the commercial activity of the Sasanids, contributing at least two commodities: precious pearls and purple dye. Under the Sasanid reign, many of the inhabitants in eastern Arabia were introduced to Christianity following the eastward dispersal of the religion by Mesopotamian Christians (see also Christianity in pre-Islamic Arabia). Monasteries were constructed and further settlements were founded during this era. During the latter part of the Christian era, Qatar comprised a region known as 'Beth Qatraye' (Syriac for "house of the Qataris"). The region was not limited to Qatar; it also included Bahrain, Tarout Island, Al-Khatt, and Al-Hasa.

In 628, the Islamic prophet Muhammad sent a Muslim envoy to a ruler in eastern Arabia named Munzir ibn Sawa Al-Tamimi and requested that he and his subjects accept Islam. Munzir obliged his request, and accordingly most of the Arab tribes in the region converted to Islam. In the middle of the century, the Muslim conquest of Persia resulted in the fall of the Sasanian Empire.

=== Early and late Islamic period (661–1783) ===
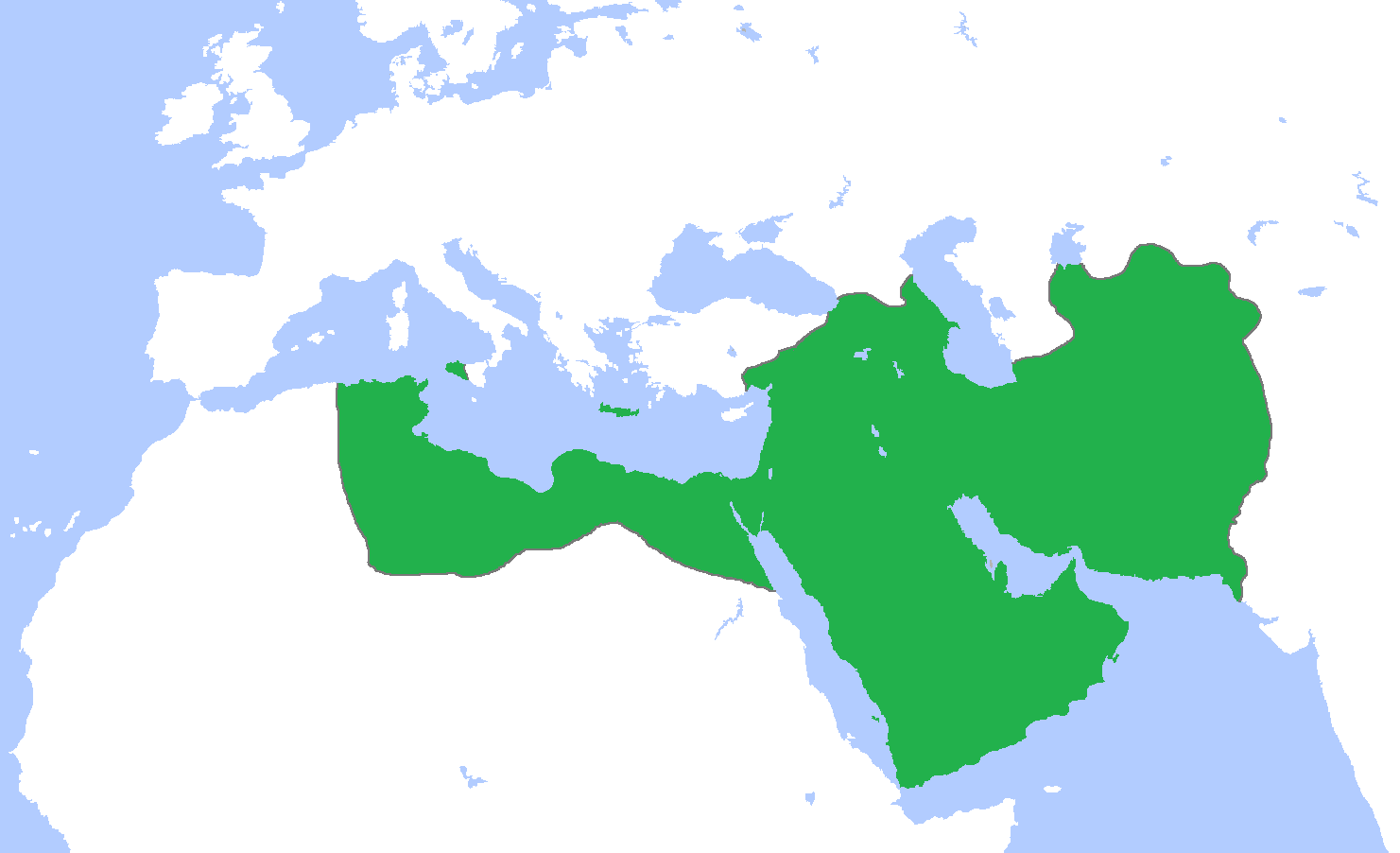
Abbasid Caliphate at its greatest extent, c. 850

Qatar was described as a famous horse and camel breeding centre during the Umayyad period. In the 8th century, it started benefiting from its commercially strategic position in the Persian Gulf and went on to become a centre of pearl trading. Substantial development in the pearling industry around the Qatari Peninsula occurred during the Abbasid period. Ships voyaging from Basra to India and China would make stops in Qatar's ports during this period. Chinese porcelain, West African coins, and artefacts from Thailand have been discovered in Qatar. Archaeological remains from the 9th century suggest that Qatar's inhabitants used greater wealth to construct higher quality homes and public buildings. Over 100 stone-built houses, two mosques, and an Abbasid fort were constructed in Murwab during this period. As the caliphate's prosperity waned in Iraq, Qatar experienced a corresponding decline.

Qatar is mentioned in 13th-century Muslim scholar Yaqut al-Hamawi's book, Mu'jam Al-Buldan, which alludes to the Qataris' fine striped woven cloaks and their skills in improvement and finishing of spears.

Much of eastern Arabia was controlled by the Usfurids in 1253, but control of the region was seized by the prince of Ormus in 1320. Qatar's pearls provided the kingdom with one of its main sources of income.

=== Portuguese era (1507–1650) ===
In 1515, Manuel I of Portugal vassalised the Kingdom of Ormus. Portugal went on to seize a significant portion of eastern Arabia in 1521.

After the fall of the Jabrid Dynasty with the conquest of Bahrain by the Portuguese, the Arabian coast up to Al Hassa came under the rule and influence of the Portuguese empire. Attempts by the Ottomans to dominate the region were eliminated with the Portuguese reconquest of the castle of Tarout or Al Qatif in 1551. In 1550, the inhabitants of Al-Hasa had voluntarily submitted to the rule of the Ottomans, preferring them to the Portuguese.

Archaeological finds are still being excavated from one of the Portuguese fortresses that served as a base to dominate the region as Ruwayda. The first representation of Qatar appears on the Portuguese map by Luis Lázaro in 1563, showing the "city of Qatar" as a fortress, possibly referring to the fort of Ruwayda.

Having retained a negligible military presence in the area, the Ottomans were expelled by the Bani Khalid tribe and their emirate in 1670.

=== Bahraini and Saudi rule (1783–1868) ===
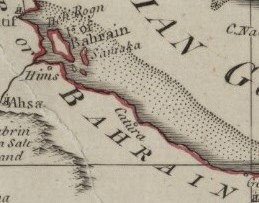
A 1794 map by Samuel Dunn depicting Catura (at centre) in the historical region of Bahrain

In 1766, members of the Al Khalifa family of the Utub tribal confederation migrated from Kuwait to Zubarah in Qatar. By the time of their arrival, the Bani Khalid exercised weak authority over the peninsula, notwithstanding the fact that the largest village was ruled by their distant kin. In 1783, Qatar-based Bani Utbah clans and allied Arab tribes invaded and annexed Bahrain from the Persians. The Al Khalifa imposed their authority over Bahrain and retained their jurisdiction over Zubarah.

Following his swearing-in as crown prince of the Emirate of Diriyah in 1788, Saud ibn Abd al-Aziz moved to expand Wahhabi territory eastward towards the Persian Gulf and Qatar. After defeating the Bani Khalid in 1795, the Wahhabi were attacked on two fronts. The Ottomans and Egyptians assaulted the western front, while the Al Khalifa in Bahrain and the Omanis launched an attack against the eastern front. Upon being made aware of the Egyptian advance on the western frontier in 1811, the Wahhabi amir reduced his garrisons in Bahrain and Zubarah in order to redeploy his troops. Said bin Sultan, Sultan of Muscat and Oman, capitalised on this opportunity and raided the Wahhabi garrisons on the eastern coast, setting fire to the fort in Zubarah. The Al Khalifa was effectively returned to power thereafter.

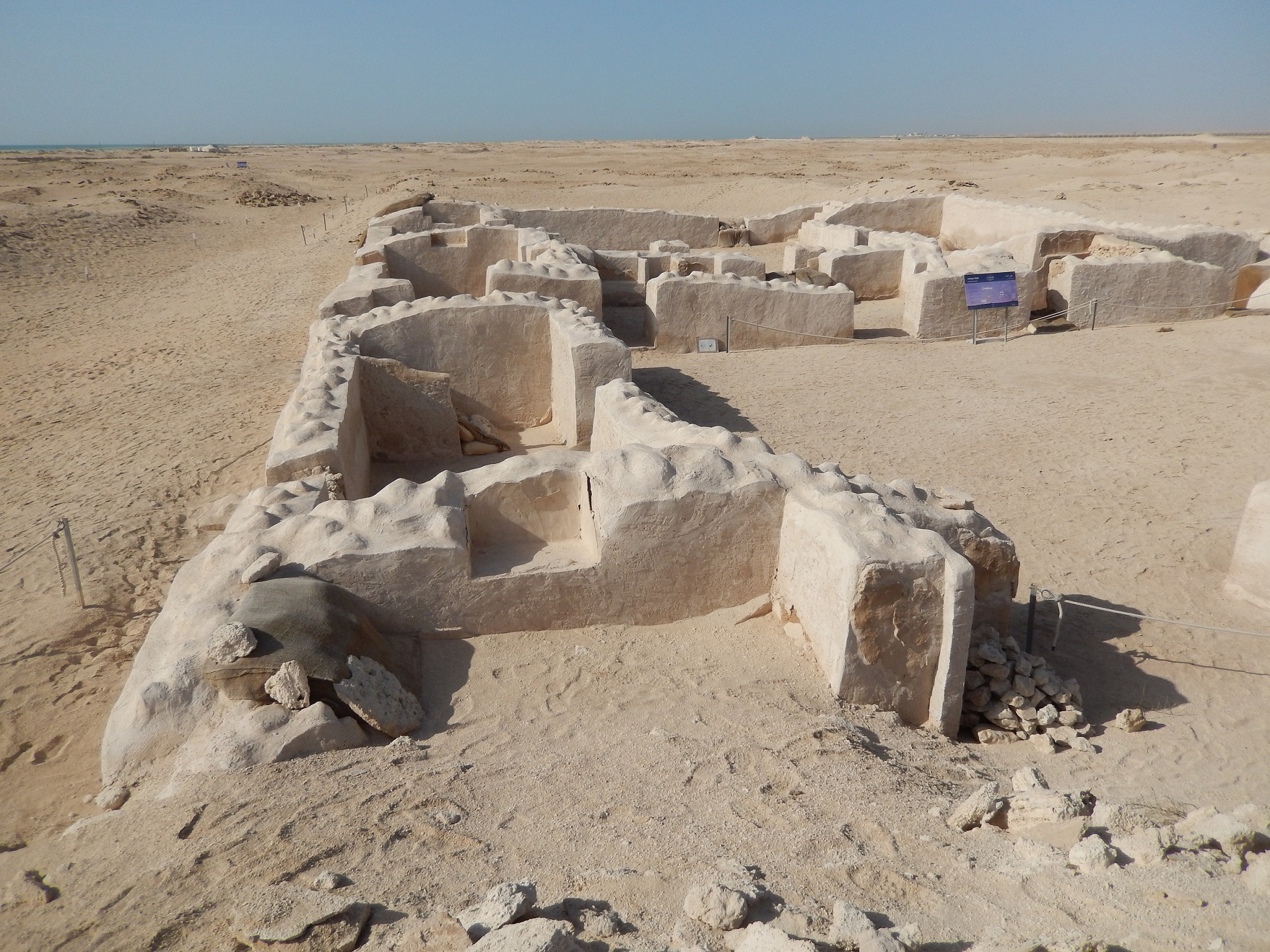
A partially restored section of the ruined town of Zubarah

As punishment for piracy, an East India Company vessel bombarded Doha in 1821, destroying the town and forcing hundreds of residents to flee. In 1825, the House of Thani was established with Sheikh Mohammed bin Thani as the first leader.

Although Qatar was considered a dependency of Bahrain, the Al Khalifa faced opposition from the local tribes. In 1867, the Al Khalifa, along with the ruler of Abu Dhabi, sent a massive naval force to Al Wakrah in an effort to crush the Qatari rebels. This resulted in the maritime Qatari–Bahraini War of 1867–68, in which Bahraini and Abu Dhabi forces sacked and looted Doha and Al Wakrah. The Bahraini hostilities were in violation of the Perpetual Truce of Peace and Friendship of 1861. The joint incursion, in addition to the Qatari counter-attack, prompted British Political Resident, Colonel Lewis Pelly to impose a settlement in 1868. His mission to Bahrain and Qatar and the resulting peace treaty were milestones because they implicitly recognised the distinctness of Qatar from Bahrain and explicitly acknowledged the position of Mohammed bin Thani. In addition to censuring Bahrain for its breach of agreement, Pelly negotiated with Qatari sheikhs who were represented by Mohammed bin Thani. The negotiations were the first stage in the development of Qatar as a sheikhdom.

=== Ottoman period (1871–1915) ===
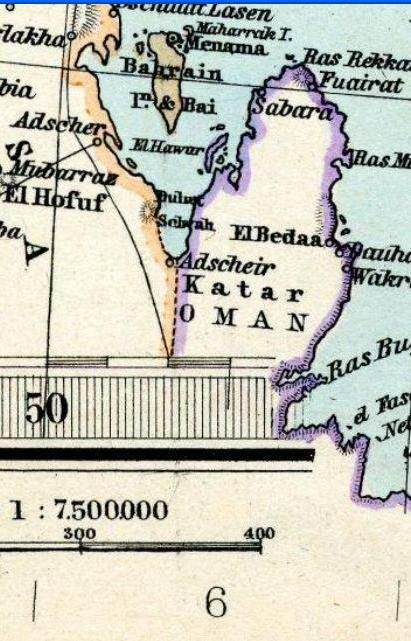
Qatar in an 1891 map by Adolf Stieler, with Al Bidda as the major settlement

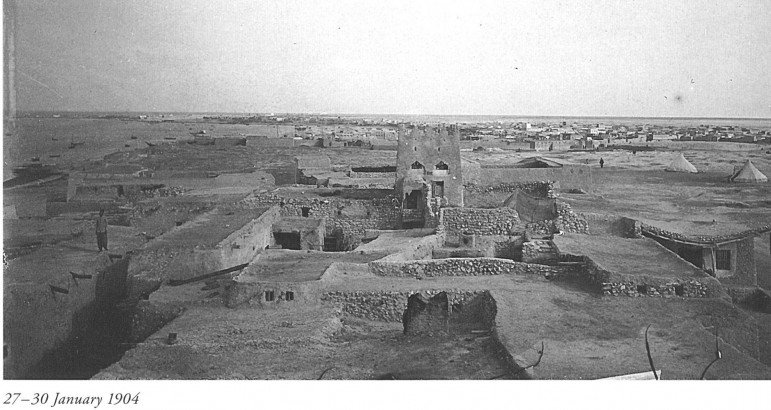
Old city of Doha, January 1904

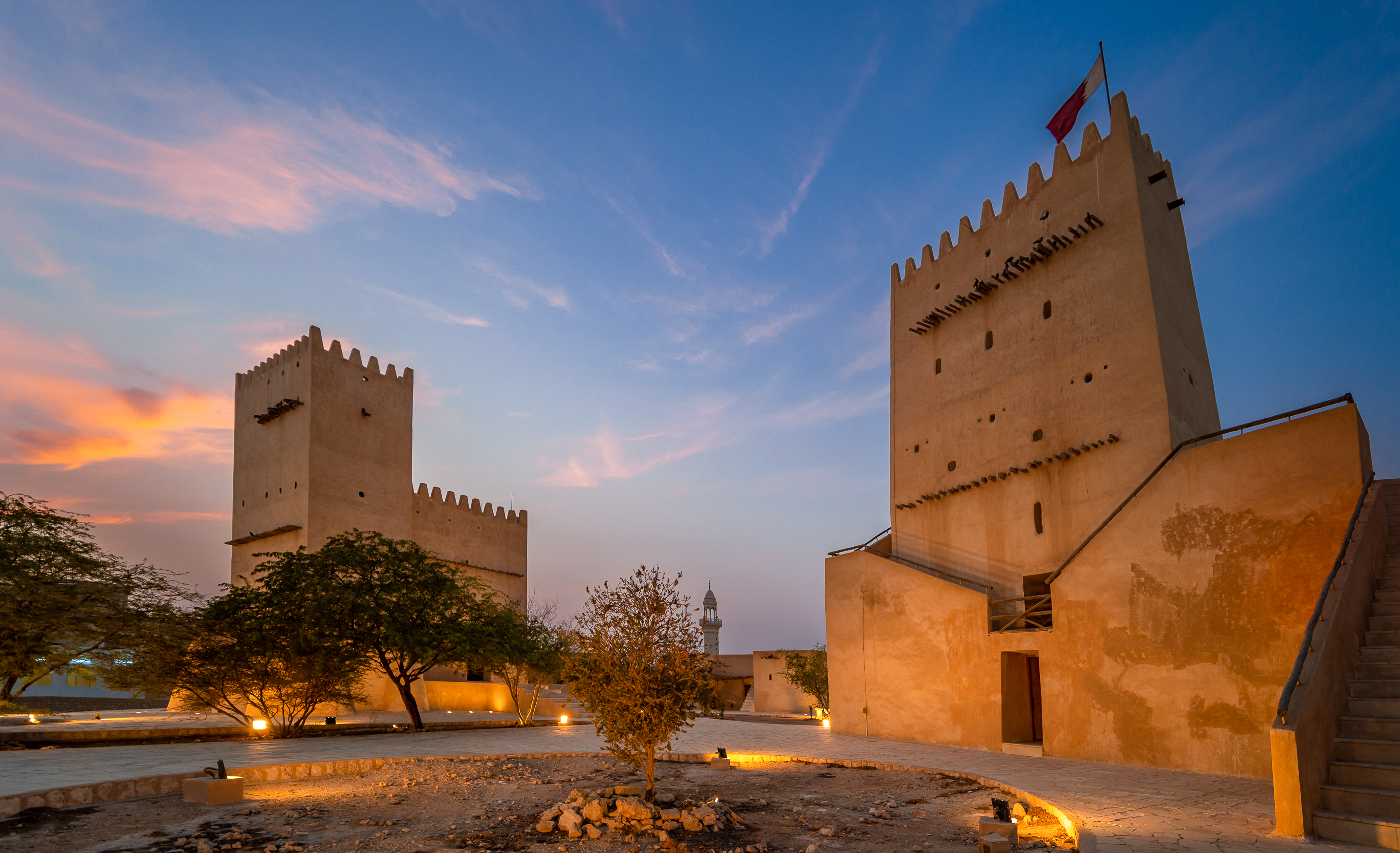
Barzan Towers are watchtowers that were built in the late 19th century and renovated in 1910 by Sheikh Mohammed bin Jassim Al Thani.

Under military and political pressure from the governor of the Ottoman Vilayet of Baghdad, Midhat Pasha, the ruling Al Thani tribe submitted to Ottoman rule in 1871. The Ottoman government imposed reformist (Tanzimat) measures concerning taxation and land registration to fully integrate these areas into the empire. Despite the disapproval of local tribes, Al Thani continued supporting the Ottoman rule. Qatari-Ottoman relations stagnated, and in 1882 they suffered further setbacks when the Ottomans refused to aid Al Thani in his expedition of Abu Dhabi-occupied Khor Al Adaid and offered only limited support in the Qatari–Abu Dhabi War, mainly due to fear of British intervention on Abu Dhabi's side. In addition, the Ottomans supported the Ottoman subject Mohammed bin Abdul Wahab who attempted to supplant Al Thani as kaymakam of Qatar in 1888. This eventually led Al Thani to rebel against the Ottomans, whom he believed were seeking to usurp control of the peninsula. He resigned as kaymakam and stopped paying taxes in August 1892.

In February 1893, Mehmed Hafiz Pasha arrived in Qatar in the interests of seeking unpaid taxes and accosting Jassim bin Mohammed's opposition to proposed Ottoman administrative reforms. Fearing that he would face death or imprisonment, Jassim retreated to Al Wajbah (16 km or 10 mi west of Doha), accompanied by several tribe members. Mehmed's demand that Jassim disband his troops and pledge his loyalty to the Ottomans was met with refusal. In March, Mehmed imprisoned Jassim's brother and 13 prominent Qatari tribal leaders on the Ottoman corvette Merrikh as punishment for his insubordination. After Mehmed declined an offer to release the captives for a fee of 10,000 liras, he ordered a column of approximately 200 troops to advance towards Jassim's Al Wajbah Fort under the command of Yusuf Effendi, thus signalling the start of the Battle of Al Wajbah.

Effendi's troops came under heavy gunfire by a sizable troop of Qatari infantry and cavalry shortly after arriving at Al Wajbah. They retreated to Shebaka fortress where they were again forced to draw back from a Qatari incursion. After retreating from Shebaka to Al Bidda, the Ottomans were besieged by Jassim's forces, forcing them to surrender, release captives, and secure safe passage for Mehmed Pasha's cavalry to Hofuf. Although Qatar did not gain full independence from the Ottoman Empire, the result of the battle forced a treaty that would later form the basis of Qatar's emerging as an autonomous country within the empire.

=== British period (1916–1971) ===
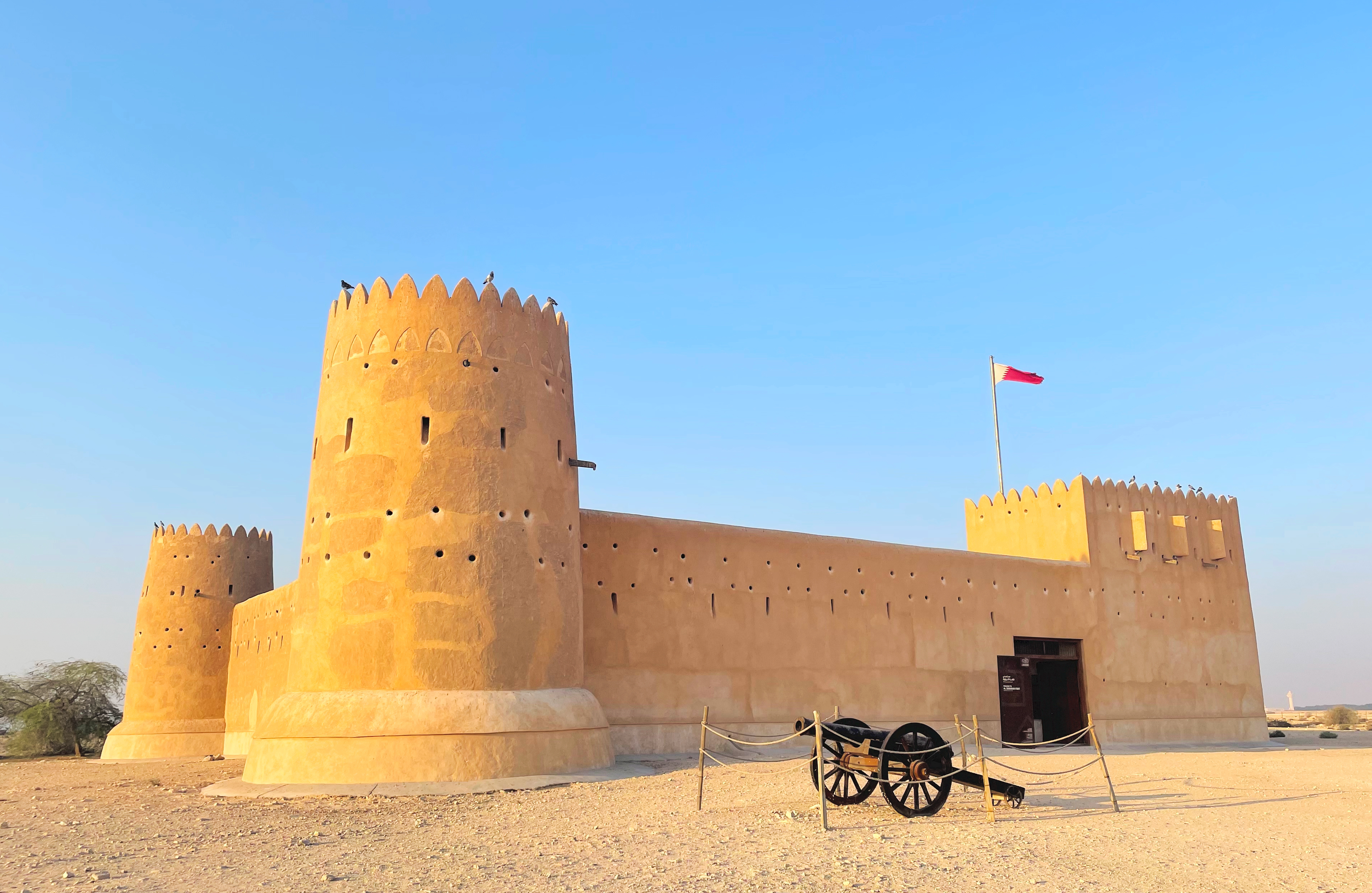
Zubarah Fort built in 1938

By the Anglo-Ottoman Convention of 1913, the Ottomans agreed to renounce their claim to Qatar and withdraw their garrison from Doha. With the outbreak of World War I however, nothing was done to carry this out, and the garrison remained in the fort at Doha, although its numbers dwindled as men deserted. In 1915, with the presence of British gunboats in the harbour, Abdullah bin Jassim Al Thani (who was pro-British) persuaded the remainder to abandon the fort, and when British troops approached the following morning, they found it deserted.

Qatar became a British protectorate on 3 November 1916 when the United Kingdom signed a treaty with Sheikh Abdullah bin Jassim Al Thani to bring Qatar under its Trucial System of Administration. The treaty reserved foreign affairs and defence to the United Kingdom but allowed internal autonomy. While Abdullah agreed not to enter into any relations with any other power without the prior consent of the British government, the latter guaranteed the protection of Qatar from aggression by sea and provide its 'good offices' in the event of an attack by land. This latter undertaking was left deliberately vague.

On 5 May 1935, while agreeing an oil concession with the Anglo-Persian Oil Company, Abdullah signed another treaty with the British government which granted Qatar protection against internal and external threats. Oil reserves were first discovered in 1939. Exploitation and development were, however, delayed by World War II.

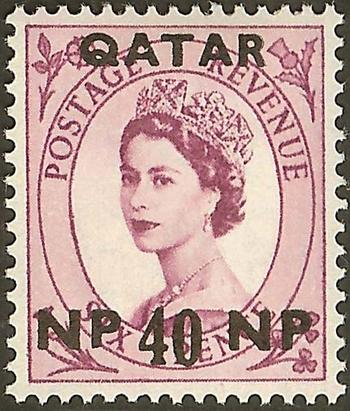
A British Wilding series stamp, issued 1 April 1957, and overprinted for use in Qatar

The focus of British interests in Qatar changed after the Second World War with the independence of India, the creation of Pakistan in 1947, and the development of oil in Qatar. In 1949, the appointment of the first British political officer in Doha, John Wilton, signified a strengthening of Anglo-Qatari relations. Oil exports began in 1949, and oil revenues became the country's main source of revenue; the pearl trade had gone into decline. These revenues were used to fund the expansion and modernisation of Qatar's infrastructure.

When Britain officially announced in 1968 that it would withdraw from the Persian Gulf in three years' time, Qatar joined talks with Bahrain and seven other Trucial States to create the Federation of Arab Emirates. Regional disputes, however, persuaded Qatar and Bahrain to withdraw from the talks and become independent states separate from the Trucial States, which went on to become the United Arab Emirates. The emir, Ahmad bin Ali, promulgated a provisional constitution in April 1970 that declared Qatar an independent, Arab, and Islamic state with sharia as its basic law. Khalifa bin Hamad was named prime minister in May 1970.

=== Independence and later (1971–2000) ===
Under an agreement with the United Kingdom, on 3 September 1971, the "special treaty arrangements" that were "inconsistent with full international responsibility as a sovereign and independent state" were terminated. Ahmad bin Ali made the announcement of Qatar's independence from his villa in Switzerland. He was deposed on 22 February 1972 by Khalifa bin Hamad, with the tacit support of Britain, Saudi Arabia, and the House of Al Thani.

In 1991, Qatar played a significant role in the Gulf War, particularly during the Battle of Khafji in which Qatari tanks rolled through the streets of the town and provided fire support for the Saudi Arabian National Guard units that were engaging Iraqi Army troops. Qatar allowed coalition troops from Canada to use the country as an airbase to launch aircraft on combat air patrol duty and also permitted air forces from the United States and France to operate in its territories. By the mid-1990s Khalifa bin Hamad was still emir, but day-to-day rule was gradually taken over by his son Hamad bin Khalifa.

In 1995, Hamad bin Khalifa Al Thani seized control of the country from his father Khalifa bin Hamad Al Thani, after having secured the support of most senior members of the royal family, as well as that of the United States. During Hamad's reign, the country enacted its first permanent constitution, following the 2003 Qatari constitutional referendum. While Hamad "hailed the event as a great step toward bringing democracy to the country", the constitution actually gave the emir "near-absolute powers", and in practice Hamad ruled an autocratic regime in Qatar. In 1999, Qatar held elections for the first time, to the advisory Central Municipal Council, in which women were also allowed to vote and stand as candidates. This made Qatar the first Gulf country to allow women to vote.

Mehran Kamrava of Georgetown University in Qatar has suggested that Qatar's highly publicized campaign of political liberalisation was meant to help stabilize the regime under Hamad, especially through support from the West, and that once sufficient stabilization was achieved, the guise of domestic liberalisation was largely dropped. Other scholars have also called Hamad's domestic political reforms "largely performative" steps, intended mostly to bolster Qatar's international image without enacting meaningful change, or said that Qatar's "political trajectory reflects a model of selective and symbolic democratization—embracing electoral forms while avoiding their full democratic substance."

An unsuccessful counter-coup was staged in 1996.

=== 21st century ===
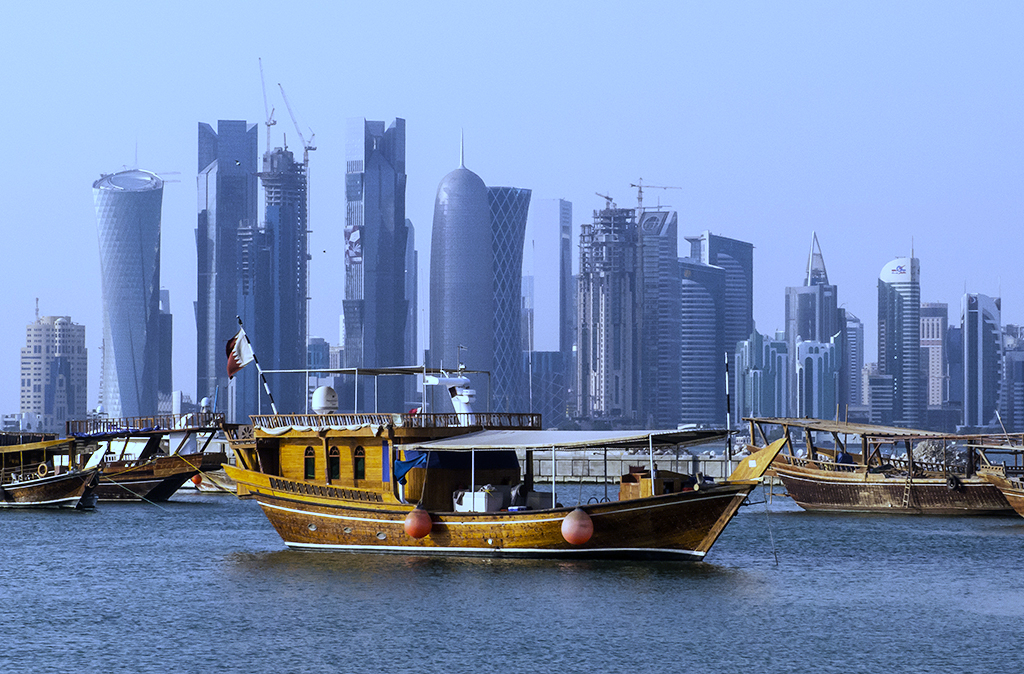
Traditional dhows in front of the West Bay skyline as seen from the Doha Corniche

Qatar's economy and status as a regional power rapidly grew in the 2000s. According to the UN, the nation's economic growth, measured by GDP, was the fastest in the world during this decade. The basis of this growth lay in the exploitation of natural gas in the North Field during the 1990s. At the same time, the population tripled between 2001 and 2011, mostly from an influx of foreigners.

In 2003, Qatar served as the United States Central Command headquarters and one of the main launching sites of the invasion of Iraq to topple the government of Saddam Hussein. Shortly before the invasion, Qatari government offered sanctuary to Saddam. In March 2005, a suicide bombing killed a British teacher at the Doha Players Theatre, shocking the country, which had not previously experienced acts of terrorism. The bombing was carried out by Omar Ahmed Abdullah Ali, an Egyptian resident in Qatar who had suspected ties to Al-Qaeda in the Arabian Peninsula.

The increased influence of Qatar and its role during the Arab Spring, especially during the 2011 uprisings in Bahrain against King Hamad bin Isa Al Khalifa, worsened longstanding tensions with Saudi Arabia, the neighbouring United Arab Emirates, and Bahrain. In 2011, Qatar joined NATO operations in Libya and reportedly armed Libyan opposition groups against Muammar Gaddafi. It was also a major funder of weapons for rebel groups in the Syrian civil war against Bashar al-Assad. Qatar participated in the Saudi Arabian-led intervention in Yemen against the Houthis and forces loyal to former President Ali Abdullah Saleh.

In June 2017, Saudi Arabia, the UAE, Bahrain, Egypt and Yemen broke diplomatic ties with Qatar, accusing Qatar of supporting terrorism. The crisis escalated a dispute over Qatar's support of the Muslim Brotherhood, which is considered a terrorist organisation by some Arab nations, as well as over its ties with Iran. Qatar was expelled from the anti-Houthi coalition. The crisis lead to a strengthening of Qatar's relationship with Iran, which provided significant material and political support, rather than its weakening. The diplomatic crisis ended in January 2021 with the signing of the al-Ula declaration. Qatar did not fulfil any of the original 13 demands, with analysts saying that the Gulf states agreed instead to a vague "joint security declaration".

On 2 December 2010, Qatar won the right to host the 2022 FIFA World Cup from 21 November to 18 December 2022, making it the first Arab and Muslim-majority country to do so, and the third Asian country to host it following the 2002 FIFA World Cup in Japan and South Korea. The awarding increased further investment and developments within the nation during the 2010s. In June 2013, Sheikh Tamim bin Hamad Al Thani became the emir of Qatar after his father handed over power. Sheikh Tamim has prioritised improving the domestic welfare of citizens, which includes establishing advanced healthcare and education systems, and expanding the country's infrastructure in preparation for the hosting of the 2022 World Cup.

== Geography ==
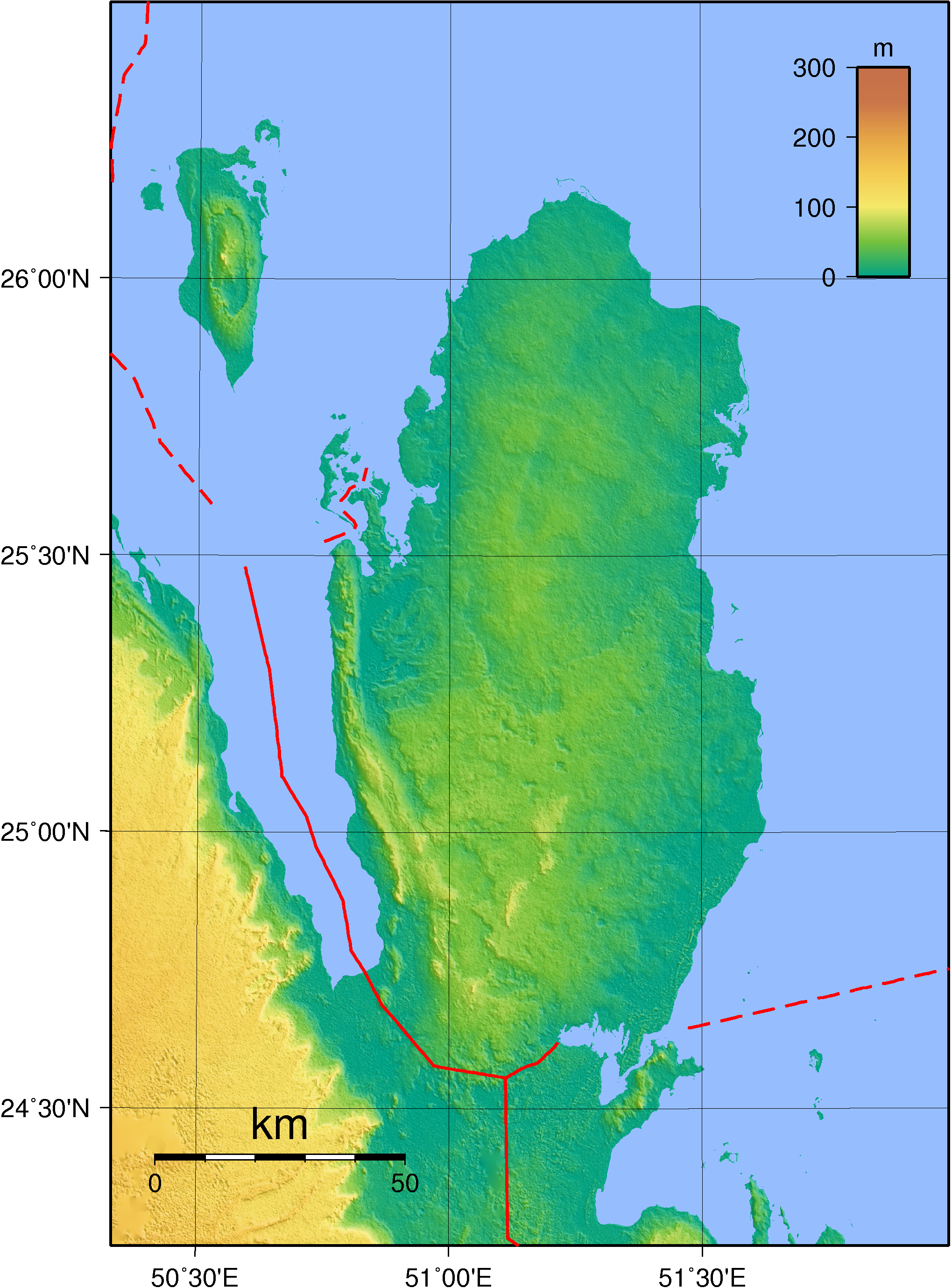
Topographic map showing pre-1974 borders with the United Arab Emirates bordering Qatar.

The Qatari peninsula protrudes 160 kilometres (100 mi) into the Persian Gulf, north of Saudi Arabia. It lies between latitudes 24° and 27° N, and longitudes 50° and 52° E. Most of the country consists of a low, barren plain, covered with sand. To the southeast lies the Khor al Adaid ("Inland Sea"), an area of rolling sand dunes surrounding an inlet of the Persian Gulf.

The highest point is Qurayn Abu al Bawl at 103 metres (338 ft) in the Jebel Dukhan to the west, a range of low limestone outcroppings running north–south from Zekreet through Umm Bab to the southern border. The Jebel Dukhan area also contains Qatar's main onshore oil deposits, while the natural gas fields lie offshore, to the northwest of the peninsula.

Qatar's geography is defined by its flat, dry desert scenery and sunshine all year. The winters are mild, with average temperatures of 18.5 °C (65.3 °F) in January, and the summers are very hot, with temperatures often reaching 40 °C (104 °F). The country only gets 70 millimetres (2.8 in) of rain a year on average, and most of that falls between October and March. These weather conditions make it possible to enjoy outdoor sports and travel for most of the year.

=== Biodiversity ===
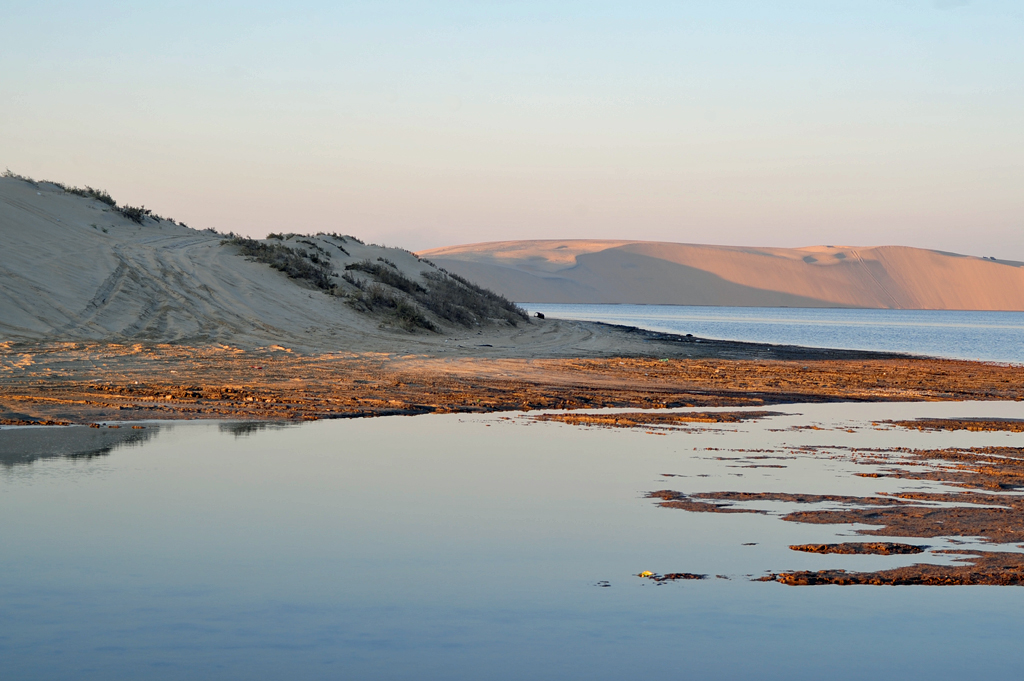
Desert coast

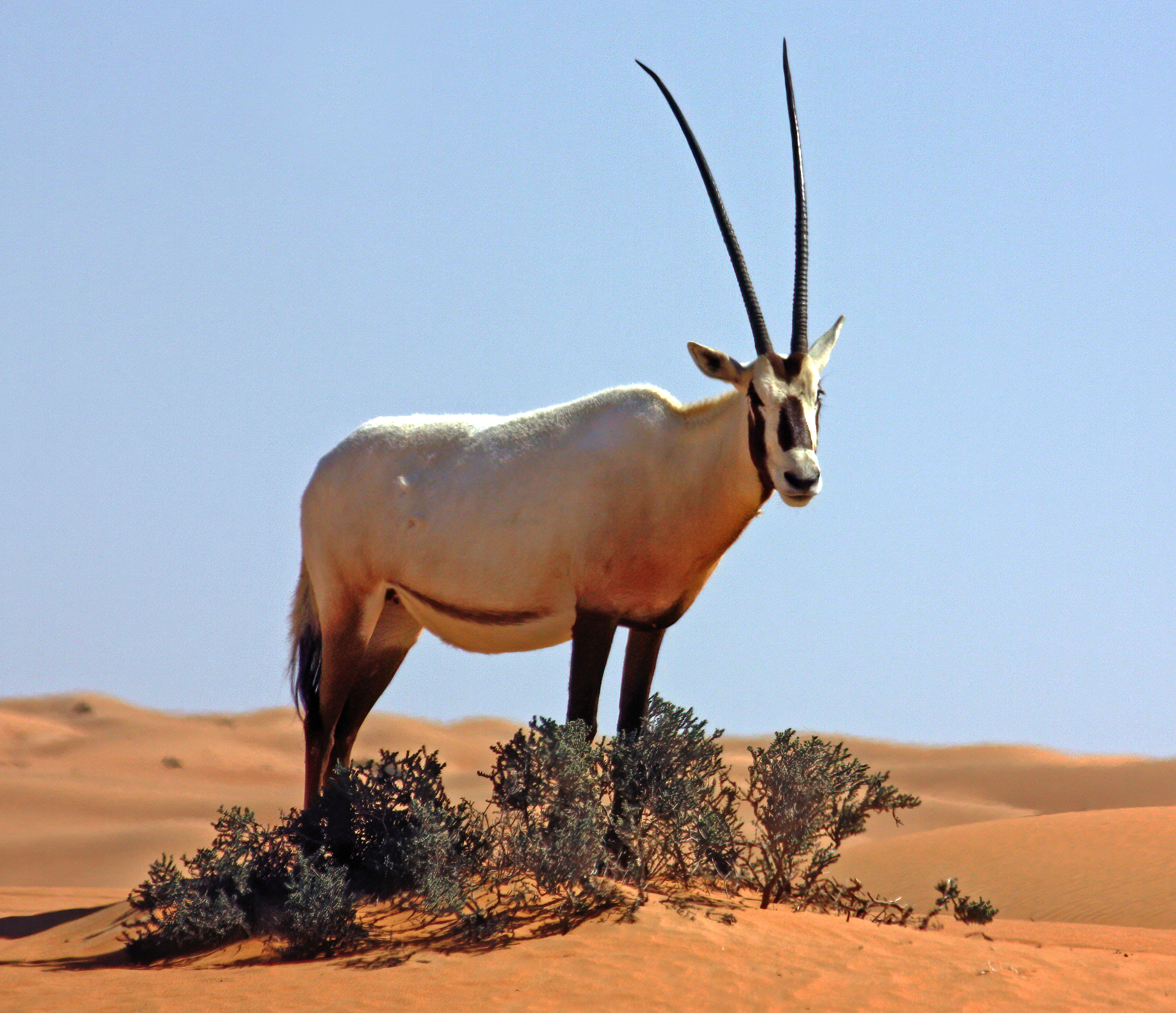
Arabian oryx, the national animal of Qatar

Qatar became part of the Rio Convention on Biological Diversity in 1996. It subsequently produced a National Biodiversity Strategy and Action Plan in 2005. A total of 142 fungal species have been recorded from Qatar. A book recently produced by the Ministry of Environment documents the lizards known or believed to occur in Qatar, based on surveys conducted by an international team of scientists and other collaborators.

Like other members of the UNFCCC, Qatar is supposed to publish details of its greenhouse gas emissions two years after they occur – however as of 2024 the latest official details are for 2007 emissions. According to the Emissions Database for Global Atmospheric Research, carbon dioxide emissions per person average over 30 tonnes, one of the highest in the world.

== Politics ==
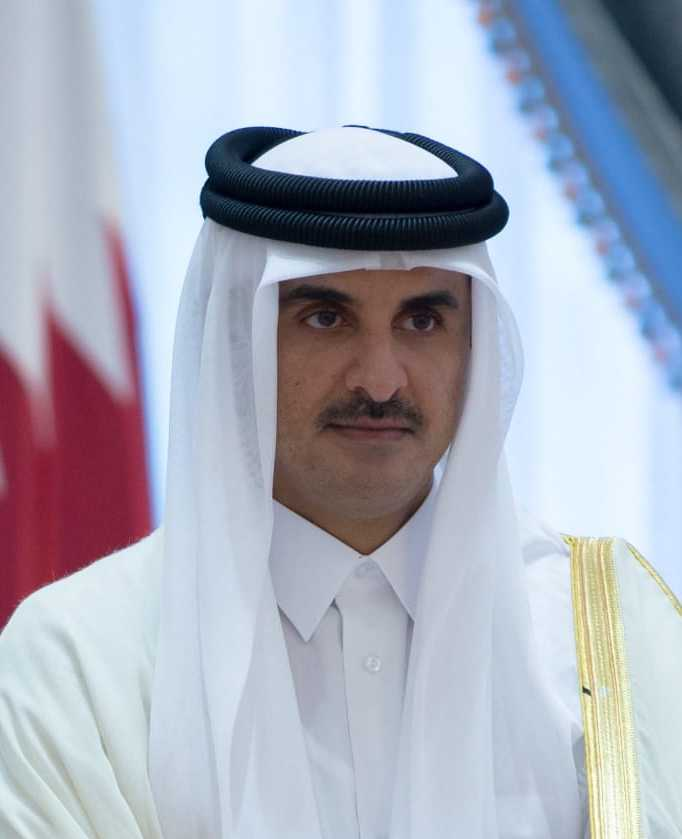
Tamim bin Hamad Al Thani
Emir since 2013

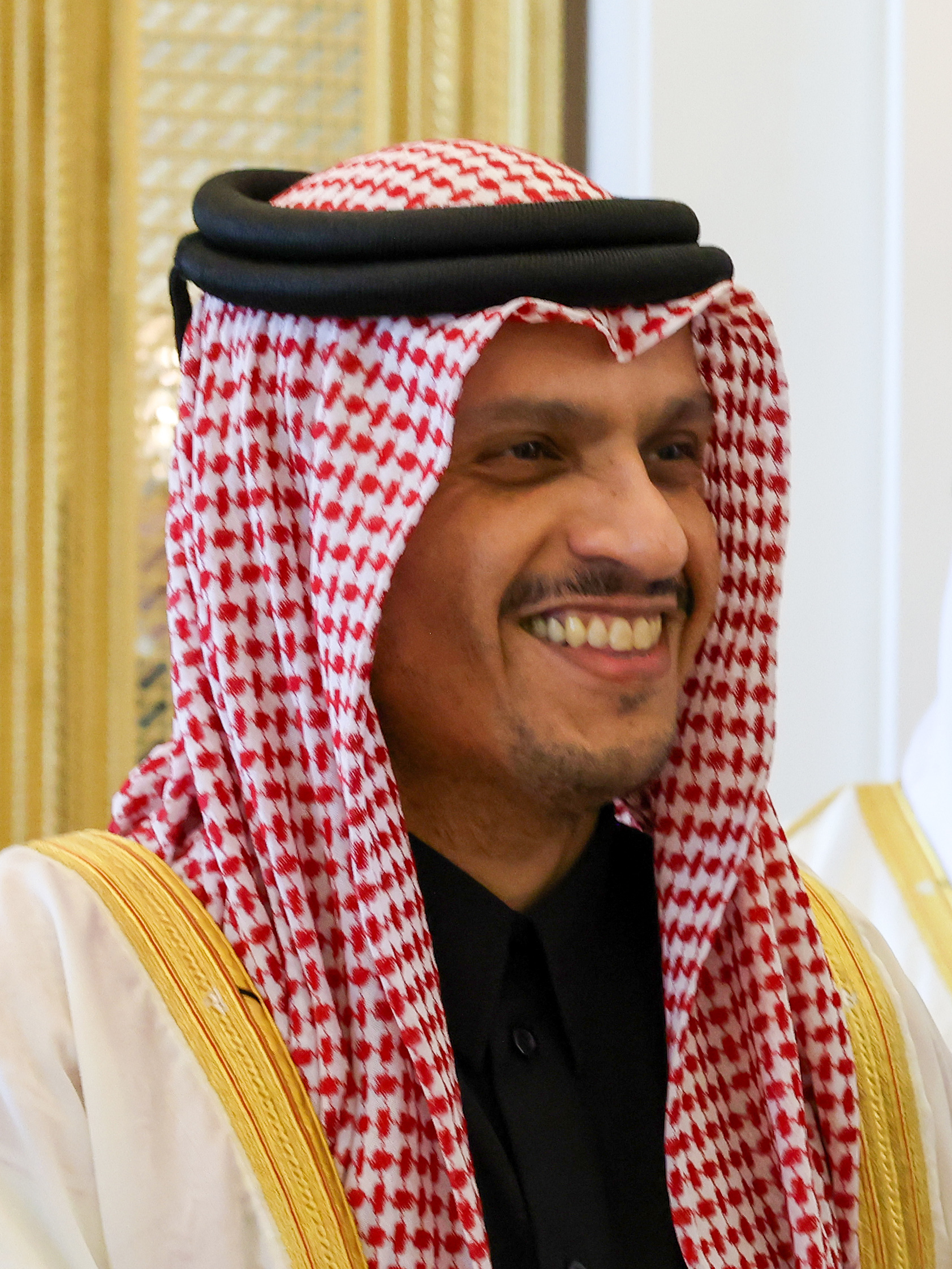
Mohammed bin Abdulrahman Al Thani
Prime Minister since 2023

Qatar is officially a constitutional hereditary monarchy, but scholars and observers consider the monarchical regime to be "authoritarian", "autocratic and absolutist", an "absolute monarchy" or even a "total autocracy". The Al Thanis first emerged as one of Qatar's influential and dominant clans in the 1850s, and accepted the suzerainty of the Ottoman Empire to strengthen their position against rivals. In 1868, the Al Thani dynasty received British recognition of its rule over the peninsula. Tamim bin Hamad Al Thani became the emir of Qatar in 2013.

The emir holds nearly all executive, legislative, and judicial authority in an autocratic manner under the Constitution of Qatar. He has the exclusive power to appoint the prime minister and cabinet ministers who, together, constitute the Council of Ministers, which is the supreme executive authority in the country. The Council of Ministers also initiates legislation, which is then approved by the Shura Council, which is also fully appointed by the emir.

As of 2024, Qatar was ranked 40 out of 180 countries in the Corruption Perceptions Index.

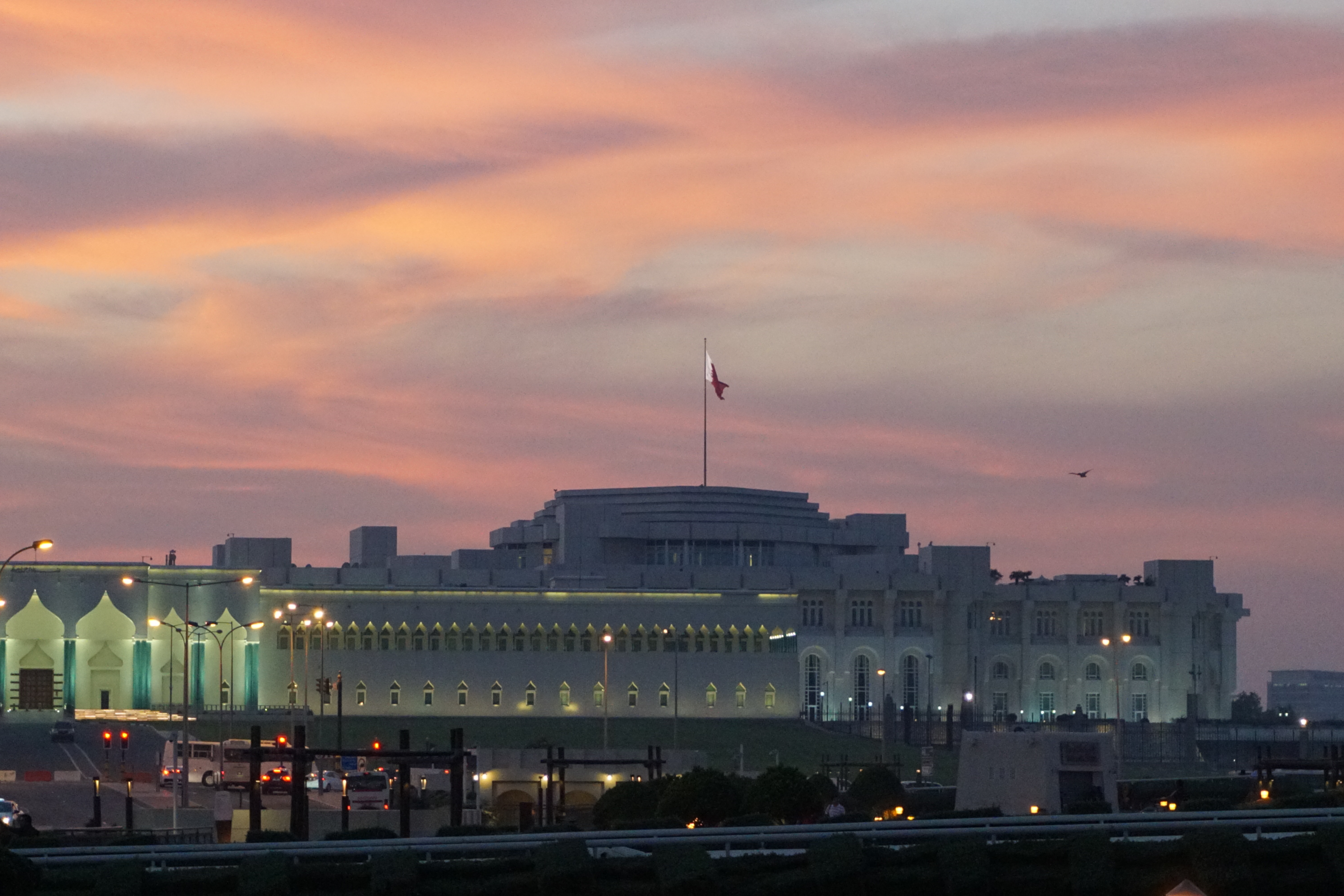
Amiri Diwan of the State of Qatar, administrative office of the Emir

=== Elections ===
In 2003, Qatar adopted a constitution that provided for the direct election of 30 of the 45 members of an advisory legislature called the Shura Council, but also outlined it as a body that has "little actual legislative powers". The Shura Council held its first general election in October 2021 after several postponements, but in November 2024 it went back to being fully appointed by the emir, ending the country's "short-lived experiment in electing members of the advisory Shura Council".

According to the 2025 Democracy Report of V-Dem Democracy indices, Qatar was second-last on the Electoral Democracy Index among Middle Eastern countries, and seventh-last worldwide from among the 179 countries rated. Qatari law does not permit the establishment of political bodies or trade unions. Additionally, according to International IDEA's Global State of Democracy (GSoD) Indices and Democracy Tracker, Qatar performs in the low range on overall democratic measures, with particular weaknesses in political representation, including credible elections, inclusive suffrage and effective parliament.

The country's first elections for the Central Municipal Council—the first-ever elections in Qatar—allowed voting for both men and women, and were intentionally held on 8 March 1999, International Women's Day.

=== Law ===
According to Qatar's Constitution, Sharia law is the main source of Qatari legislation, although in practice Qatar's legal system is a mixture of civil law and Sharia. Sharia is applied to family law, inheritance, and several criminal acts (including adultery, robbery, and murder). In some cases, Sharia-based family courts treat a female's testimony as being worth half that of a man. Codified family law was introduced in 2006. Islamic polygyny is permitted.

Judicial corporal punishment is a punishment in Qatar. Only Muslims considered medically fit are liable to have such sentences carried out. Flogging is employed as a punishment for alcohol consumption or illicit sexual relations. Article 88 of the criminal code declares that the penalty for adultery is 100 lashes. Stoning is a legal punishment in Qatar, and apostasy and homosexuality are crimes punishable by the death penalty; however, the penalty has not been carried out for either crime. Blasphemy can result in up to seven years in prison, while proselytising can incur a 10-year sentence.

Alcohol consumption is partially legal; some five-star luxury hotels are allowed to sell alcohol to non-Muslim customers. Muslims are not allowed to consume alcohol, and those caught consuming it are liable to flogging or deportation. Non-Muslim expatriates can obtain a permit to purchase alcohol for personal consumption. The Qatar Distribution Company (a subsidiary of Qatar Airways) is permitted to import alcohol and pork; it operates the only liquor store in the country, which also sells pork to holders of liquor licences. Qatari officials had indicated a willingness to allow alcohol in "fan zones" at the 2022 FIFA World Cup. However, on 18 November, two days before the start of the games, Qatari officials announced alcoholic beverages would not be permitted within the stadiums.

In 2014, a modesty campaign was launched to remind tourists of the country's restrictive dress code. Female tourists were advised not to wear leggings, miniskirts, sleeveless dresses, or short or tight clothing in public. Men were warned against wearing shorts and singlets.

=== Administrative divisions ===
Qatar is divided into eight municipalities. The municipalities are further subdivided into 98 zones, which are in turn subdivided into blocks.

Municipalities of Qatar as of 2014

Key	Municipality (Baladiyah)	Capital
1	Al Shamal	Madinat ash Shamal
2	Al Khor	Al Khor City
3	Al-Shahaniya	Al-Shahaniya City
4	Umm Salal	Umm Salal Ali
5	Al Daayen	Umm Qarn
6	Doha (municipality)	Doha
7	Al Rayyan	Al Rayyan City
8	Al Wakrah	Al Wakrah

=== Foreign relations ===
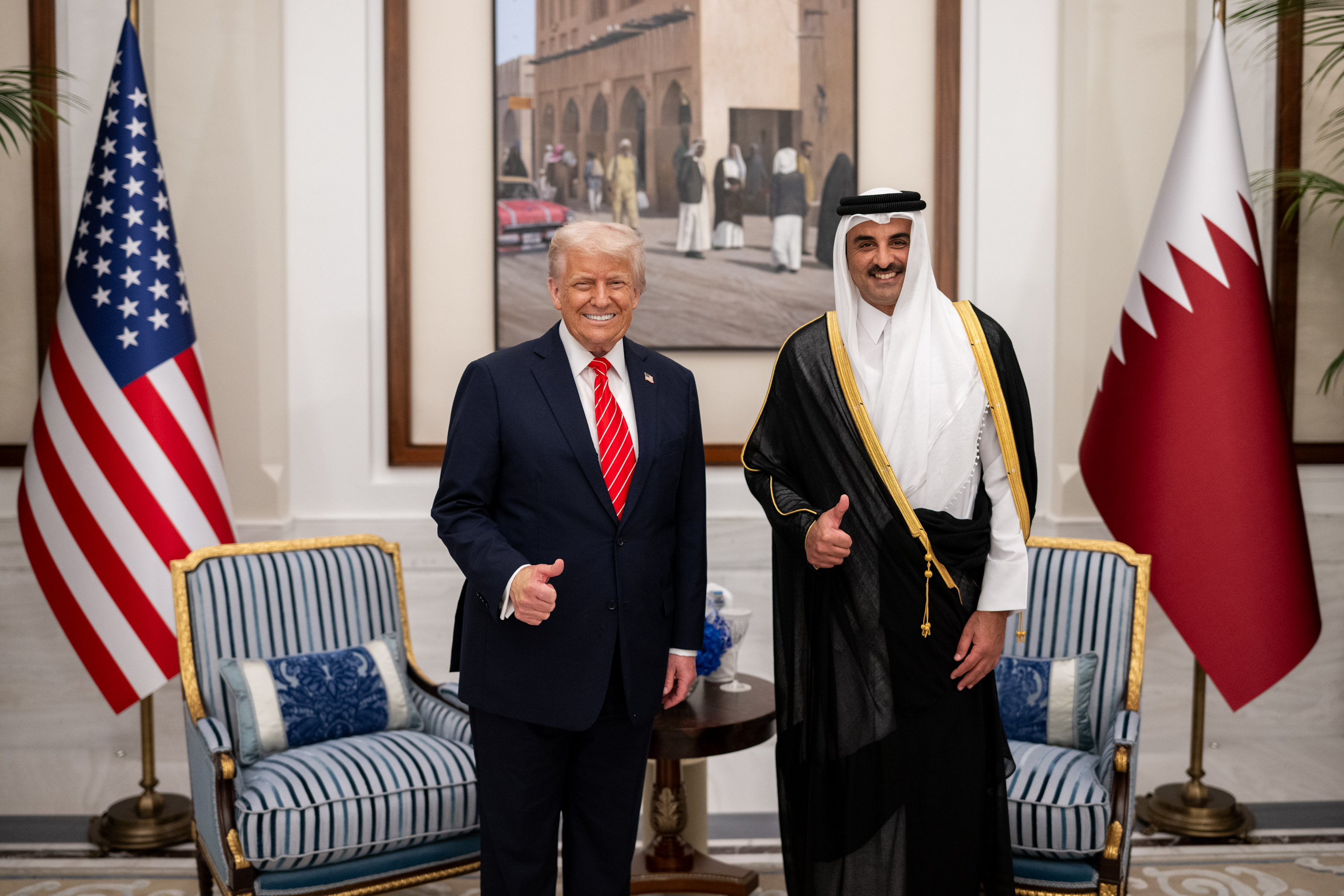
Emir Tamim bin Hamad Al Thani and US President Donald Trump in Lusail, Qatar, during Donald Trump's visit to the Middle East, May 2025

Qatar's international profile and active role in international affairs have led some analysts to identify it as a middle power. Regional relations and foreign policies are characterised by the strategy of balancing and alliance building among regional and great powers. It maintains independent foreign policy and engages in regional balancing to secure its strategic priorities and to have recognition on the regional and international level. As a comparatively small state in the gulf, Qatar established an "open-door" foreign policy where Qatar maintains ties to all parties and regional players in the region. Diplomatic missions to Qatar are based in its capital, Doha.

Since 2022, it has been a major non-NATO ally of the United States. Qatar also has particularly strong ties with France, China, Iran, Turkey, as well as a number of Islamist movements in the Middle East such as the Muslim Brotherhood. The country is an early member of OPEC and a founding member of the Gulf Cooperation Council, as well as a member of the Arab League. The country has led numerous investments and economic cooperations with Iraq, Syria and Palestine. Qatar supported opposition groups in Libya and Syria and participated in Saudi-led intervention in Yemen against the Houthis and forces loyal to former president Ali Abdullah Saleh. In 2022, four people were arrested because of corruption. This came to be known as the Qatar corruption scandal at the European Parliament.

Since the 2000s, Qatar increasingly emerged on a wider foreign policy stage especially as a mediator for Middle Eastern conflicts. Qatar mediated between the rival Palestinian factions Fatah and Hamas in 2006 and helped unite Lebanese leaders into forming a political agreement during the 2008 crisis. It has also emerged as mediators in African and Asian affairs, notably holding a peace process for Sudan amid the Darfur conflict and facilitating peace talks for Afghanistan, setting up a political "office" for Taliban to facilitate talks. Ahmed Rashid, writing in the Financial Times, stated that through the office Qatar has "facilitated meetings between the Taliban and many countries and organisations, including the US state department, the UN, Japan, several European governments and non-governmental organisations, all of whom have been trying to push forward the idea of peace talks." It played a major role in establishing the first ceasefire in the Gaza war and the concurrent initial hostage exchange. These high-risk diplomatic middle man endeavours (and its own rigorous defence stance) have thus earned it a reputation as "a prickly Switzerland".

On 2 October 2020, Qatari authorities strip-searched 13 Australian women on a plane at Hamad International Airport over a premature baby found in a bathroom at the terminal. This caused an international incident with Australia. In September 2023, Qatar mediated the US-Iran prisoners swap deal. Iran freed five US citizens in exchange for five Iranians held in the US and transfer US$6 billion in frozen Iranian money from South Korea to Qatar. In October 2023, US President Joe Biden thanked the Qatar's Sheikh Tamim bin Hamad Al Thani for his help in mediating a landmark prisoner swap deal with Iran. On 24 September 2024, Qatar was designated as the first Gulf country to join the US Visa Waiver Programme (VWP), allowing its citizens to travel to the US for up to 90 days for business or tourism without a visa. The inclusion strengthens security cooperation between the two nations and eases travel for Qatari citizens. US citizens are now permitted to stay in Qatar for up to 90 days without a visa, an increase from the previous 30-day limit.

=== Military ===
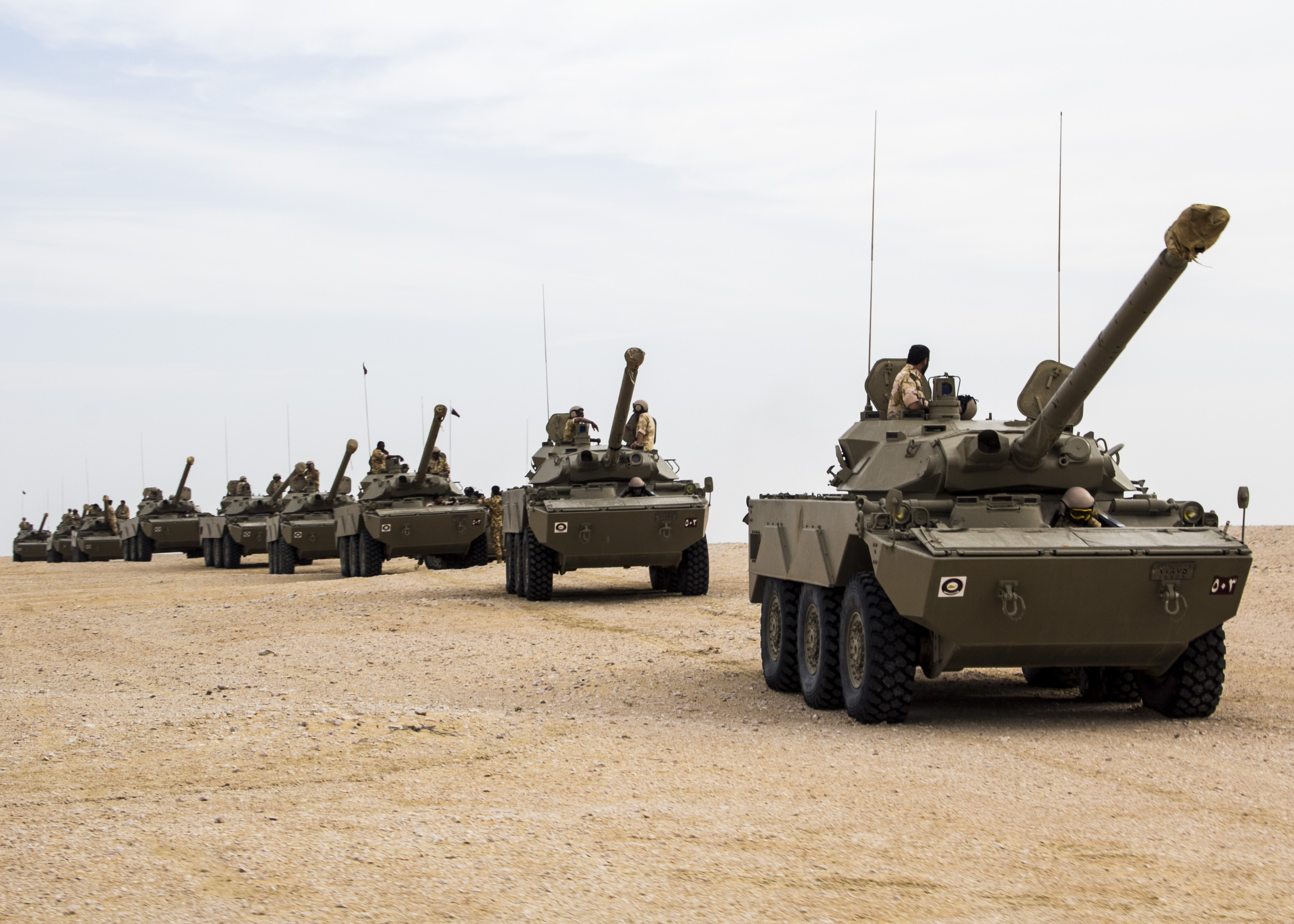
AMX-10 RC of the Qatari Emiri Land Force

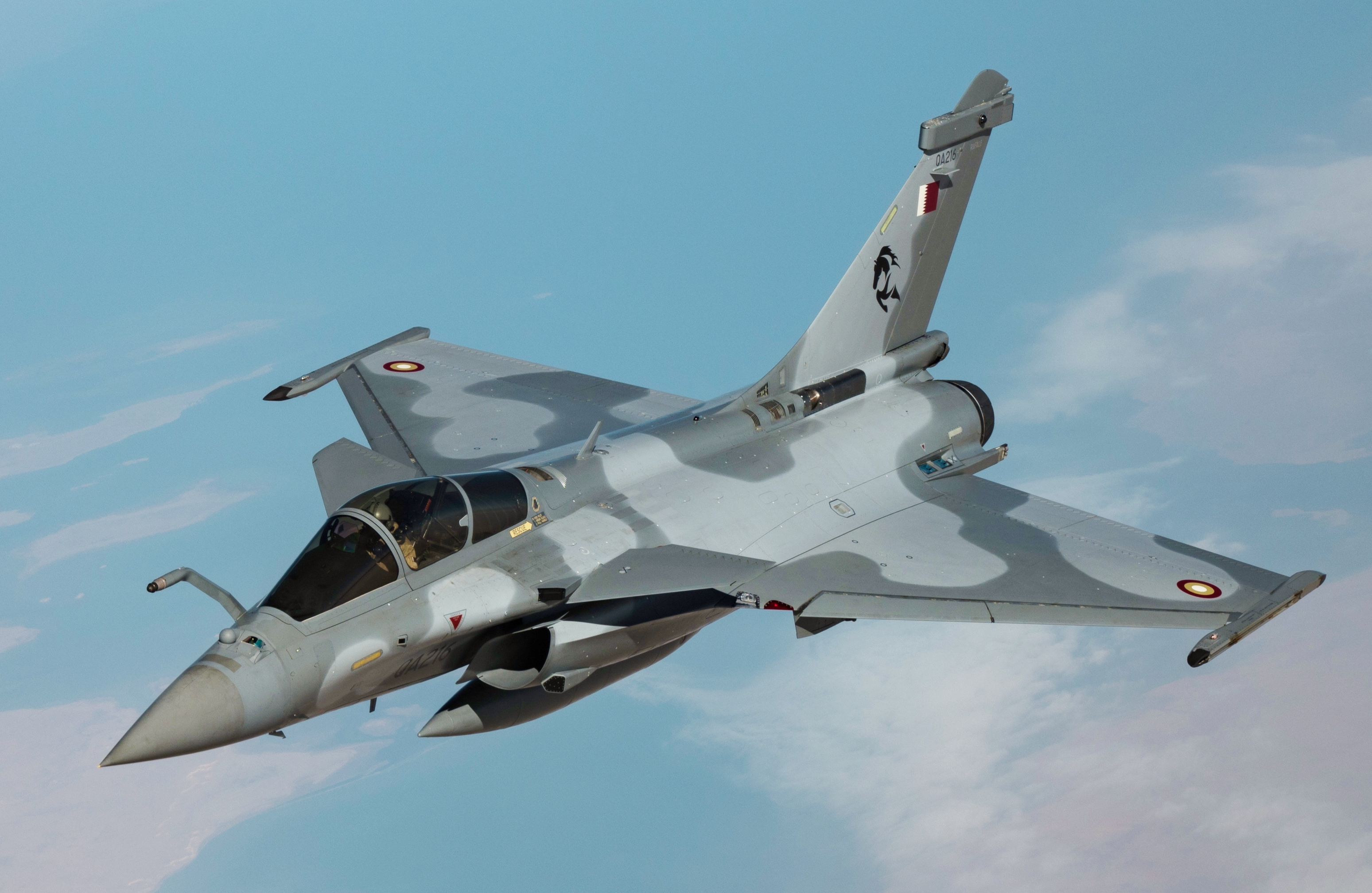
Dassault Rafale of the Qatar Emiri Air Force

The Qatar Armed Forces consist of 12,000 personnel in the Qatari Emiri Land Forces, 2,500 in the Navy, 2,000 in the Air Force, and 5,000 in the Internal Security Forces. After the Arab spring events in 2011 and a diplomatic incident with Saudi Arabia and other Gulf countries in 2014, Qatar started expanding its armed forces. The country introduced conscription in 2013, the first Gulf state to do so in recent years, and extended the service term in 2018, requiring male Qatari citizens who are called up to serve one year. About 2,000 conscripts pass through the Qatar Armed Forces annually.

In 2008 Qatar spent US$2.6 billion on its military, which was 2% of the GDP, and its military spending increased to US$7.49 billion as of 2022. The Stockholm International Peace Research Institute (SIPRI) found that in 2010–2014 Qatar was the 46th-largest arms importer in the world. SIPRI writes that Qatar's plans to transform and significantly enlarge its armed forces have accelerated. In 2015, Qatar was the 16th largest arms importer in the world, and in 2016, it was the 11th largest, according to SIPRI. Since 2017, Qatar has purchased large quantities of equipment from European countries and the United States, making its air force one of the largest among the Gulf states. According to research published in November 2024, Qatar has dramatically increased its military power, as its expenditure grew by 434%. Corruption in arms trading, especially bribery, has been one consequence.

Qatar has signed defence pacts with the US, the UK, and France. The forward headquarters of United States Central Command, Al Udeid Air Base, is located in Qatar and houses about 10,000 US military personnel. During the 2011 military intervention in Libya, Qatar deployed six Mirage 2000 fighter jets to assist the NATO air campaign against the Libyan government and special forces to provide training to Libyan rebels. During the Saudi-led intervention in the Yemeni civil war from 2015, Qatar sent 1,000 troops, 200 armoured vehicles, and 30 Apache helicopters to assist with Saudi military operations. Qatar withdrew its forces from Yemen due to the diplomatic crisis with Saudi Arabia in 2017. Qatar is the 29th most peaceful country in the world, according to the 2024 Global Peace Index.

=== Censorship ===
Although the Ministry of Information was abolished in 1998, with the press occasionally allowed to criticize the economy or the status of foreign workers, according to Reporters Without Borders in 2026, journalists continued to face a "draconian system of censorship" in Qatar. It has been noted in scholarship that the Qatari government "made great play" of the abolition of the Ministry of Information promising greater press freedom, and that in reality the step was a "highly symbolic gesture" intended to signal reform to international partners while attempting to "carefully, selectively, and pre-emptively remain in control of content". There are currently seven local newspapers in circulation in Qatar, four published in Arabic and three in English, all of which practice significant self-censorship.

In late 2016, Doha News, which had become the most popular local news platform in Qatar and was widely considered to be the only independent and reliable source for news within the country, was locally blocked by Qatari authorities. The official claim was that the reason was lack of proper licensing, but this was widely rejected as an excuse for censorship. In May 2020, Doha News was allowed to relaunch in Qatar, with a different team and under an unspecified new owner. The Global Investigative Journalism Network noted in 2021 that since 2017 Doha News has "toned down its critical reporting", but added that it does still "provide a welcome relief from the seven newspapers in the country that practice extreme censorship".

=== Human rights ===
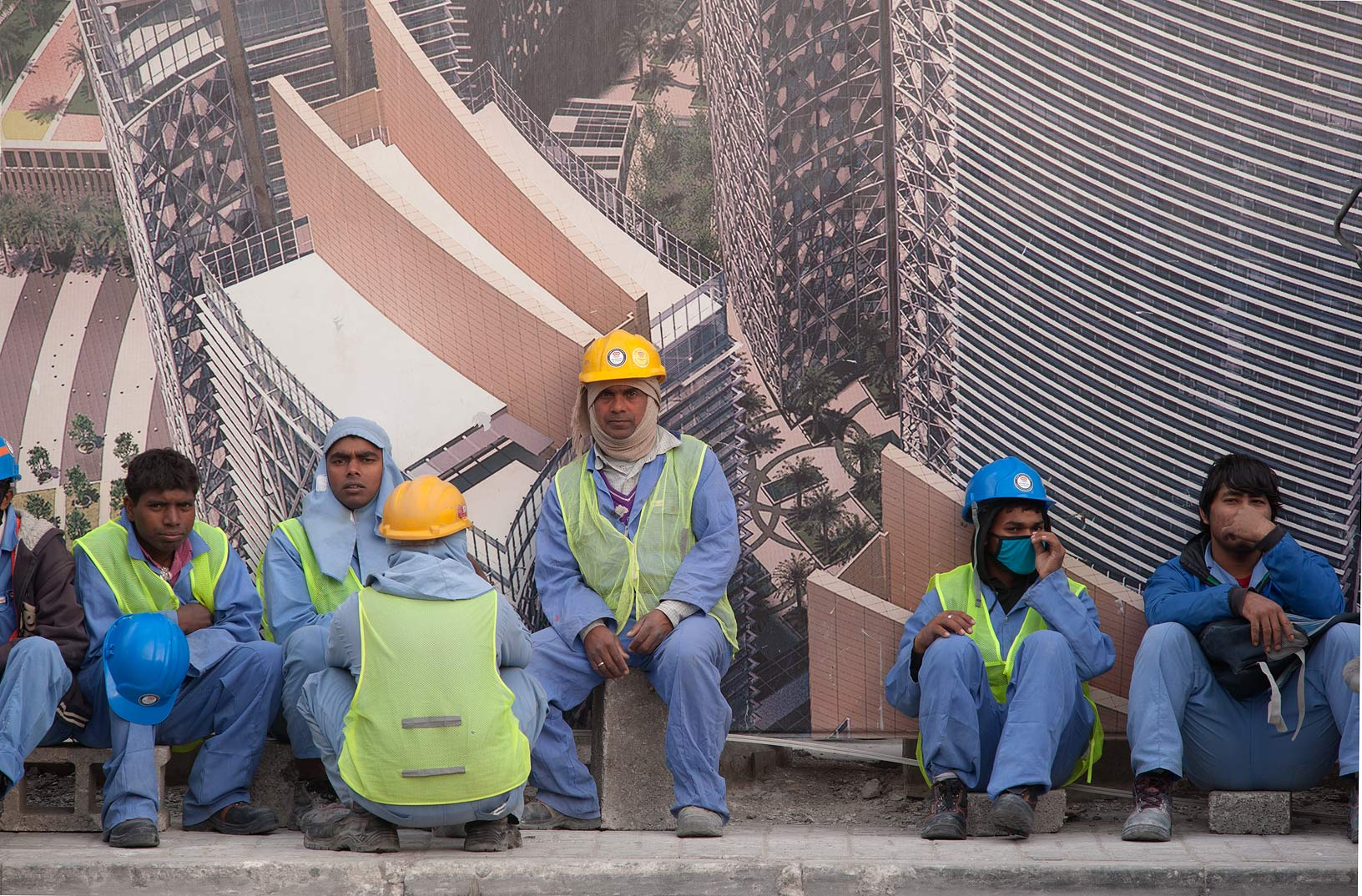
Migrant workers in Doha, 2014

Qatar's human rights record has been regarded by academics and non-governmental organisations as being generally poor, with restrictions on civil liberties such as the freedoms of association, expression and the press, as well as its treatment of migrant workers amounting to forced labour for projects in the country. Women and LGBTQ+ people face legal and social discrimination. The UN has issued hundreds of human rights recommendations to Qatar.

==== Rights of foreign labourers ====
As of 2025, foreign workers make up around 91% of Qatar's population, constituting around 95% of its labour force, and according to the International Labour Organization, Qatar does not consider this population as "migrant workers", but rather as "guests" or "non-Qataris".

This population is subject to a kafala system, whereby they are heavily dependent on the Qatari citizens sponsoring their work visas, leaving them vulnerable to exploitation. Following a massive increase in scrutiny after Qatar's controversial election to host the 2022 FIFA World Cup in 2010, the government has announced many steps of reform, including announcing multiple times that the Kafala system has been effectively abolished. Despite these steps, in their reports for the year 2025 both Human Rights Watch and Amnesty International have found that foreign labourers in Qatar continue to face widespread abuses under a "restrictive" and "exploitative" Kafala system. Human Rights Watch's report said that the reforms have had "limited impact", and that the country has failed to address serious violations against workers, who still "face wage theft, unexplained deaths, dangerous working conditions and continued exploitation after the tournament."

==== Male guardianship system ====
As of 2026, women and girls in Qatar are still subject to extensive legal and social discrimination under a male guardianship system. They must receive permission from male guardians "to marry, travel abroad, work in many government jobs, study on scholarships, and access some reproductive health services". Married women can by default travel without permission, but a male guardian can petition a court to issue a travel ban.

==== Gender wage gap ====
Both Qatari and non-Qatari women are affected by a widening wage gap. They are paid 25% to 50% less than men, despite the fact that their working hours are comparable. The difference is due in part to the social allowances by government afforded to men as household heads, such as housing and travel allotments, which female employees are less likely to receive.

==== Sex outside marriage and reproductive rights ====
Women in Qatar convicted for "illicit relations" (sex outside marriage) may be imprisoned for up to seven years, although usually the courts decide on one year. It is often poor domestic workers from Southeast Asian countries who are convicted, even when they have been raped, if the judge thinks they are lying.

Many women who get pregnant with an illegitimate child are jailed. Non-citizens who are forced to have sponsors are usually denied the right to leave Qatar and are therefore forced to seek refuge and counsel from their embassy. Despite the effort of embassies, many still land in jail. According to Najeeb al-Nuaimi, a criminal lawyer and former justice minister of Qatar, many women are able to avoid prison or be released from it by marrying the father of their baby, at which point the woman is allowed to leave the country with her new husband.

==== LGBTQ rights ====
Homosexual acts are illegal and can be punished by death. However, there is no such evidence that the death penalty has been given for same-sex relations in practice.

According to Human Rights Watch in 2026, LGBTQ people in Qatar "face arbitrary arrest under vague and broad morality laws, harsh treatment in detention, including beatings, verbal abuse, sexual harassment, and denial of legal or medical access, and forced conversion therapy for transgender women." A senior researcher for HRW told The Guardian in 2022 of a transgender woman who was detained underground in solitary confinement for two months underground, had her long hair forcibly shaved in detention, was severely beaten her until she bled, and was denied access to medical care.

In 2022, Naser Mohamed, a prominent Qatari doctor and gay rights activist living in the United States, told The Guardian that LGBTQ people in Qatar are held and physically abused by authorities, then are promised safety from further torture if they agree to work as agents and help authorities find other LGBTQ+ people.

In 2024, Manuel Guerrero Aviña, a Mexican-British citizen working for Qatar Airways, was arrested in Qatar after police officers impersonated a gay man on Grindr and arranged a "date" with him. Qatari officials claimed that he was arrested on drug charges, and that they did not even know about his sexuality until after the arrest, but his family retorted that he was not a drug user, that he was forced to sign documents that he did not understand in Arabic, and that he was interrogated about other gay men after the fake Grindr "date" arranged by the police. Aviña was released to await trial after 44 days in detention, and The UN’s Working Group on Arbitrary Detention expressed deep concerns about his treatment, including reported denial of access to life-saving HIV medication. Amnesty International called the case "nothing short of horrific", and expressed fears that he was coerced into providing information to authorities that could be used to hurt other LGBTQ people.

==== Corporal punishment ====
The UN Committee Against Torture found that the provisions for flogging and stoning within the Qatari criminal code constituted a breach of the obligations imposed by the UN Convention Against Torture.

== Economy ==
High-rise buildings in Doha

Before the discovery of oil, the economy focused on fishing and pearl hunting. A report prepared by local governors of the Ottoman Empire in 1892 states that income from pearl hunting in 1892 is 2,450,000 kran. After the introduction of the Japanese cultured pearl onto the world market in the 1920s and 1930s, Qatar's pearling industry crashed. Oil was discovered in Qatar in 1940, in Dukhan Field. The discovery transformed the state's economy. Now, the country has a high standard of living for its legal citizens. With no income tax, Qatar has one of the lowest tax rates in the world. The unemployment rate in June 2013 was 0.1%. Corporate law mandates that Qatari nationals must hold 51% of any venture in the emirate. Trade and industry is overseen by the Ministry of Business and Trade.

As of 2016, Qatar has the fourth highest GDP per capita in the world, according to the International Monetary Fund. It relies heavily on foreign labour to grow its economy, to the extent that migrant workers compose 86% of the population and 94% of the workforce. Economic growth has been almost exclusively based on its petroleum and natural gas industries, which began in 1940. Qatar is the leading exporter of liquefied natural gas. In 2012, it was estimated that Qatar would invest over US$120 billion in the energy sector in the next 10 years. The country was a member state of the Organization of Petroleum Exporting Countries (OPEC), having joined in 1961, and having left in January 2019.

Qatar Central Bank's office in Doha

In 2012, Qatar retained its title of richest country in the world (according to per capita income) for the third time in a row, having first overtaken Luxembourg in 2010. According to the study published by the Washington-based Institute of International Finance, the per capita GDP at purchasing power parity (PPP) was US$106,000 (QR387,000) in 2012, helping the country retain its ranking as the world's wealthiest nation. Luxembourg came a distant second with nearly US$80,000 and Singapore third with per capita income of about US$61,000. The research put Qatar's GDP at US$182bn in 2012 and said it had climbed to an all-time high due to soaring gas exports and high oil prices. Its population stood at 1.8 million in 2012.

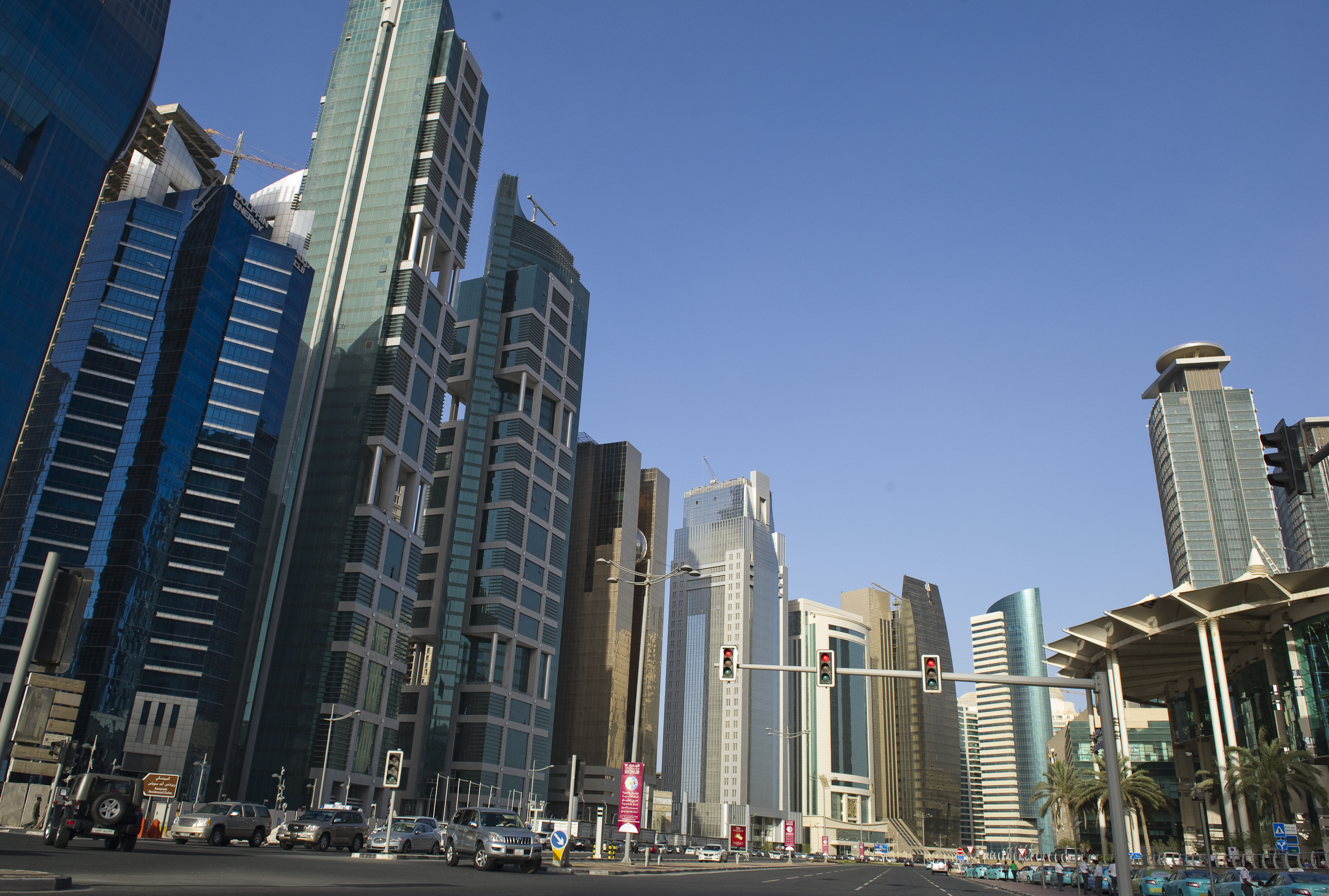
Business district in Doha

Established in 2005, Qatar Investment Authority is the country's sovereign wealth fund, specialising in foreign investment. In 2012, with assets of US$115bn, QIA was ranked 12th among the richest sovereign wealth funds in the world. With billions of USdollars in surpluses from the oil and gas industry, the Qatari government has directed investments into US, Europe, and Asia Pacific. Qatar Holding is the international investment arm of QIA. Since 2009, Qatar Holding has received US$30–40bn per year from the state. As of 2014, it has investments around the world in Valentino, Siemens, Printemps, Harrods, The Shard, Barclays Bank, Heathrow Airport, Paris Saint-Germain F.C., Volkswagen Group, Royal Dutch Shell, Bank of America, Tiffany, Agricultural Bank of China, Sainsbury's, BlackBerry, and Santander Brasil.

The country has no taxes on non-companies, but authorities have announced plans to levy taxes on junk food and luxury items. The taxes would be implemented on goods that harm the human body—for example, fast food, tobacco products, and soft drinks. The rollout of these initial taxes is believed to be the result of the fall in oil prices and a deficit that the country faced in 2016. Additionally, the country saw job cuts in 2016 from its petroleum companies and other sectors in the government.

As part of Qatar National Vision 2030, the country is making its economy less dependent on oil and gas by expanding its range of industries. Funds are being put into projects related to schooling, tourism, and green energy. Qatar is putting a lot of effort into green energy. By 2030, they want 20% of their energy to come from solar power. As part of the economic transformation, the tourist industry is growing, which helps the GDP grow and makes the country less reliant on oil exports.

=== Energy ===
As of 2016, Qatar's proven oil reserves were estimated at 25.2 billion barrels, positioning it as the 13th largest globally, accounting for approximately 1.53% of the world's total reserves.

Qatar's proven reserves of gas are the third-largest in the world, exceeding 250 trillion cubic feet (7,000 km^{3}). The economy was boosted in 1991 by completion of the US$1.5B Phase I of North Field gas development. In 1996, the Qatargas project began exporting liquefied natural gas to Japan.

Qatar's heavy industrial projects, all based in Umm Said, include a refinery with a 50,000 barrels (8,000 m^{3}) per day capacity, a fertiliser plant for urea and ammonia, a steel plant, and a petrochemical plant. All these industries use gas for fuel. Most are joint ventures between European and Japanese firms and the state-owned QatarEnergy. The US is the major equipment supplier for Qatar's oil and gas industry, and US companies are playing a major role in North Field gas development.

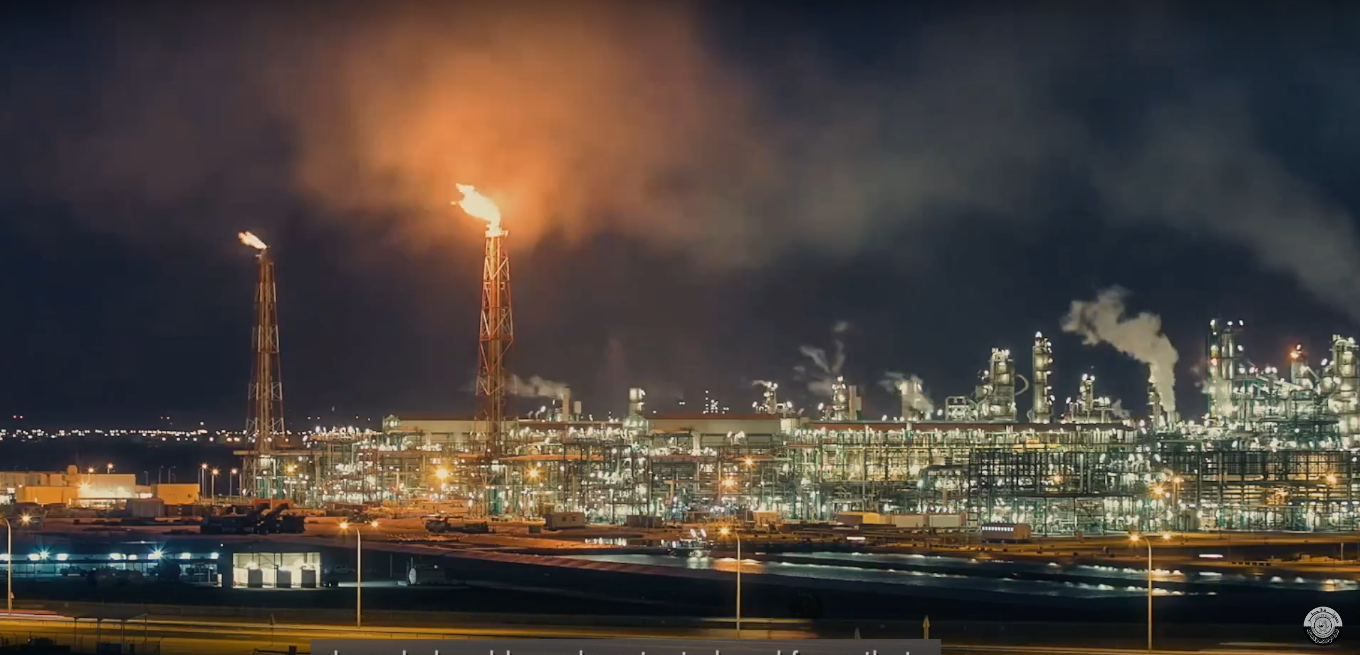
Mesaieed Industrial Area

In 2008 Qatar launched its National Vision 2030 which highlights environmental development as one of the four main goals for Qatar over the next two decades. The National Vision pledges to develop sustainable alternatives to oil-based energy to preserve the local and global environment. Qatar has made investment in renewable resources a major goal for the country over the next two decades. By 2030, Qatar has set the goal of attaining 20% of its energy from solar power. The country is well-positioned to capitalise on photovoltaic systems, as it has a global horizontal irradiance value of approximately 2,140 kWh per square metre annually. Furthermore, the direct irradiance parameter is roughly 2,008 kWh/m^{2} annually, implying that it would be able to benefit from concentrated solar power as well. Qatar Foundation has been active in helping the solar power goals. It established Qatar Solar, which, together with Qatar Development Bank and German company SolarWorld, embarked on a joint venture resulting in the creation of Qatar Solar Technologies (QSTec). In 2017, QSTec commissioned its polysilicon plant in Ras Laffan. This plant has a capacity of 1.1 MW of solar power.

Qatar pursues a vigorous programme of "Qatarisation", under which all joint venture industries and government departments strive to move Qatari nationals into positions of greater authority. Growing numbers of foreign-educated Qataris, including many educated in the US, are returning home to assume key positions formerly occupied by expatriates. To control the influx of expatriate workers, Qatar has tightened the administration of its foreign manpower programmes over the past several years. Security is the principal basis for Qatar's strict entry and immigration rules and regulations.

On 2 March 2026, on the third day of the Iran war, the Qatari Ministry of Defence announced that Ras Laffan Industrial City and Mesaieed Industrial Area were struck by two Iranian drones. QatarEnergy soon announced that it has ceased all production of natural gas and its associated products, reportedly on order by Energy Minister Saad Sherida al-Kaabi. It later announced that it was declaring Force Majeure on its contracts with buyers, and internal sources speaking to Reuters said that it would soon be shutting down gas liquefication, and that restarting it would take weeks. These announcements caused increases in world gas prices, which analysts said was a part of the Iranian government's plan to apply pressure on the world to stop the war. On 6 March, al-Kaabi warned that if the war continues other Gulf energy producers may be forced to halt exports and declare Force Majeure, and that "this will bring down economies of the world". This announcement caused a jump in global oil prices.

On 6 March, it was reported that according to satellite imagery analysis by both Bloomberg and the Energy Economics and Society Research Institute in Tokyo, Ras Laffan, the main gas facility in Qatar, appears to have not been damaged before the "unprecedented shutdown" which sent fuel prices higher.

=== Tourism ===
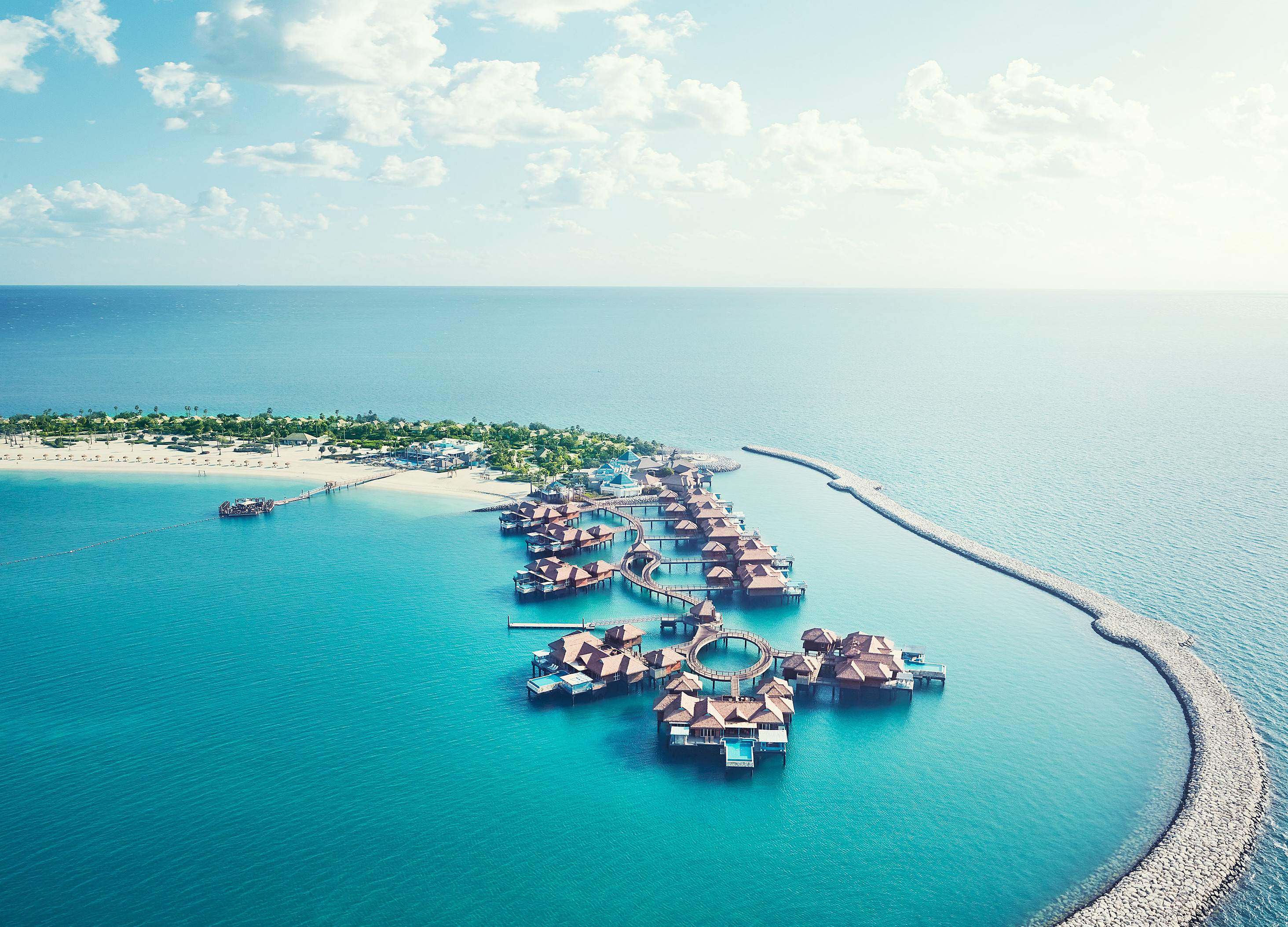
Tourist resort at Banana Island in Qatar

Katara Towers, part of the new hospitality at Lusail Qatar

Qatar is one of the fastest growing countries in the field of tourism. According to the World Tourism rankings, more than 2.3 million international tourists visited in 2017. Qatar has become one of the most open countries in the Middle East due to its recent visa facilitation improvements, including allowing nationals of 88 countries to enter visa-free and free-of charge. Qatar was recently put in the top eight in market climate in the Middle East by the Travel & Tourism Competitiveness Survey 2019 of the World Economic Forum.

Doha is one of the fastest-growing hotel and hospitality markets in the world. The $220 billion spent on infrastructure since the successful World Cup bid of 2010 has helped boost the industry. Hotels have also been helped by the country's geographic location. The tourism sector continues to witness a strong recovery with more than 729,000 international visitors in the first half of 2022, marking a 19% increase compared to the full year of 2021, and the aim is to raise tourism to 12% of GDP by 2030. The tourist industry in Doha has grown rapidly, making it a hub for international tourists. The Museum of Islamic Art, Souq Waqif, and the Katara Cultural Village are among the most popular places to visit. Nationals of 88 countries are able to enter Qatar without a visa, making it one of the most accessible destinations in the Middle East. The government has set goals to increase the share of tourism towards its GDP to 12% by 2030, contributed to by its hosting of major sporting events such as the 2022 FIFA World Cup and the upcoming 2030 Asian Games.

The nation is also on course to experience a major jump in athletic and corporate tourism with hosting world-class tournaments such as the 2030 Asian Games and the 2022 FIFA World Cup. Qatar Airways, as well as Hamad International Airport, provide travellers with one of the best transportation services in the world, and this has increased tourism in Qatar. Gulf News, a research centre in Qatar, by examining the statistics of recent years and upcoming events, has predicted that the country will earn US$11B and US$900M from attracting foreign travellers by 2020. The reason for this upward trend is the increase in hospitality and attention to the country's culture in Qatar.

=== Transport ===
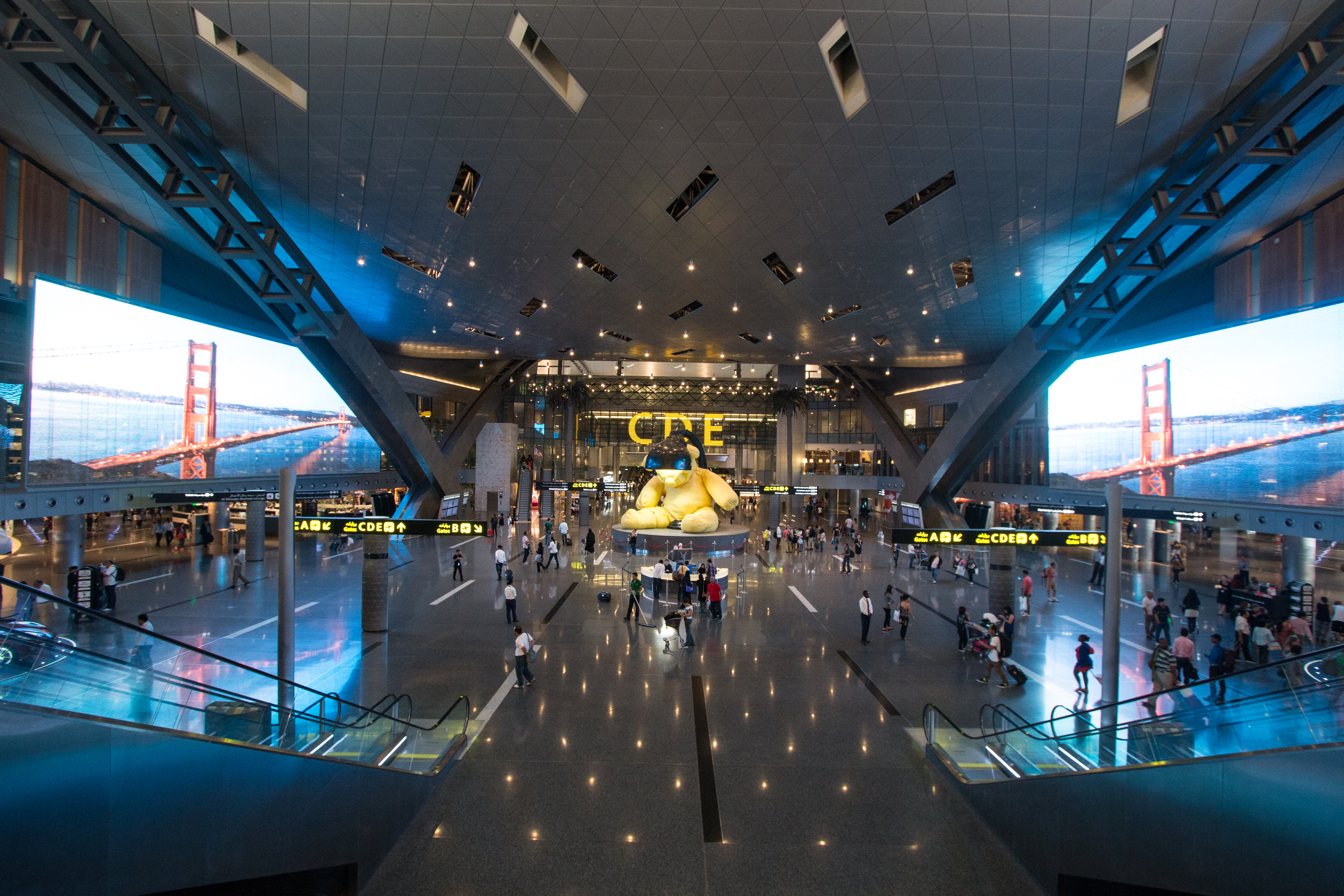
Hamad International Airport

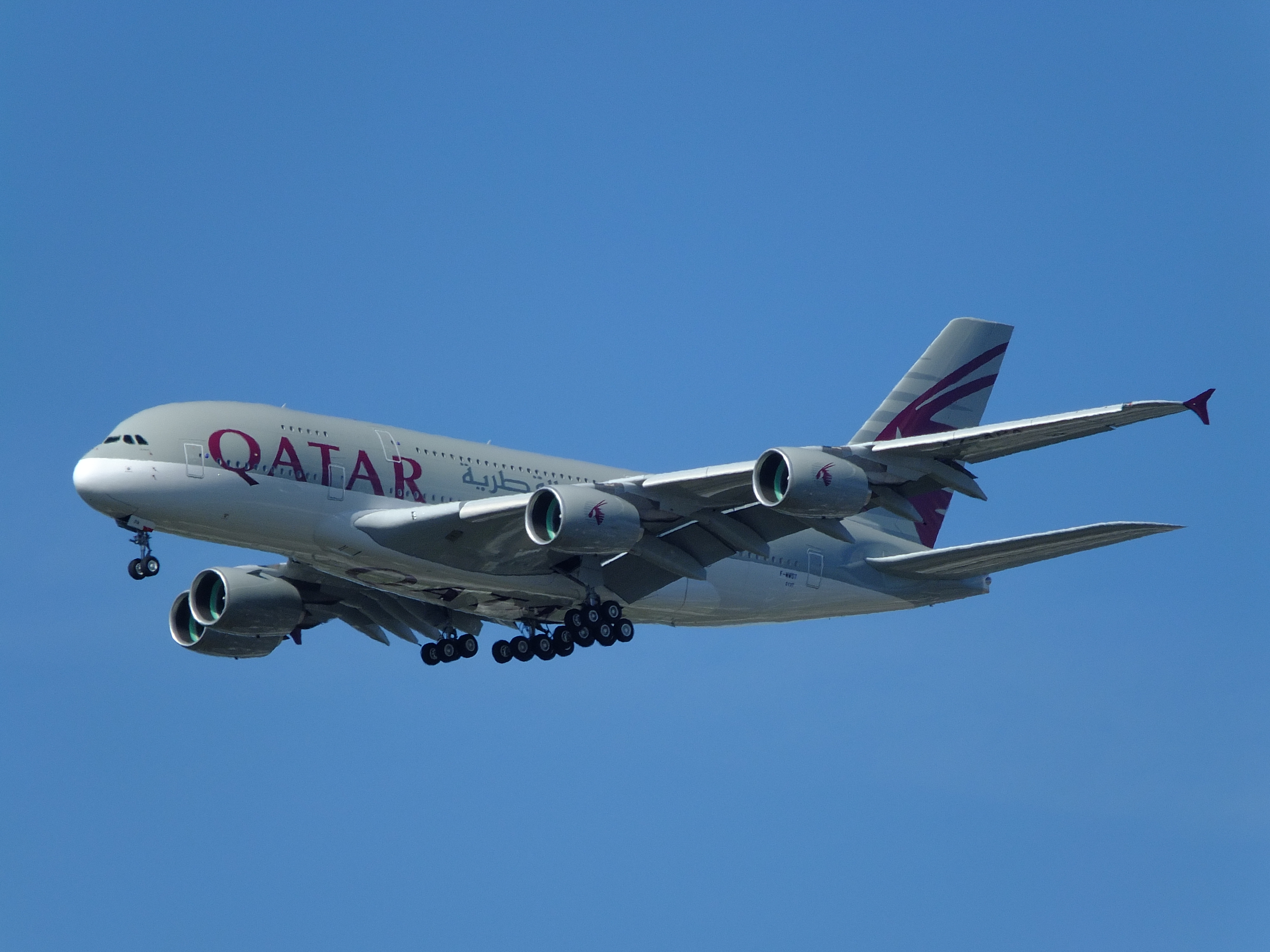
Qatar Airways Airbus A380. Qatar Airways, one of the world's largest airlines, links over 150 international destinations from its base in Doha.

Qatar has significantly developed its transportation infrastructure to enhance global connectivity and support economic growth. Key developments include expansions of Hamad International Airport (DOH), enhancements to Qatar Airways' fleet, and the development of Hamad Port.

DOH, Qatar's largest international airport and the primary hub for the nation's flag carrier, Qatar Airways, was constructed in 2014 to replace the aging Doha International Airport. Since commencing operations on 30 April 2014, the airport has undergone substantial expansions to accommodate increasing passenger traffic. The first phase, launched in 2022, introduced a new terminal, hotel, and the ORCHARD tropical garden. The subsequent phase aims to boost capacity to 70 million passengers and includes a new cargo terminal.

Qatar Airways, which operates all regularly scheduled commercial flights through DOH, won Airline of the Year in 2011, 2012, 2015, 2017, and 2019, and employs over 46,000 people. The airline also plans to place a significant aircraft order to increase annual passenger numbers from 50 million to 80 million over the next five to six years. This expansion is expected to enhance the airline's global network and services.

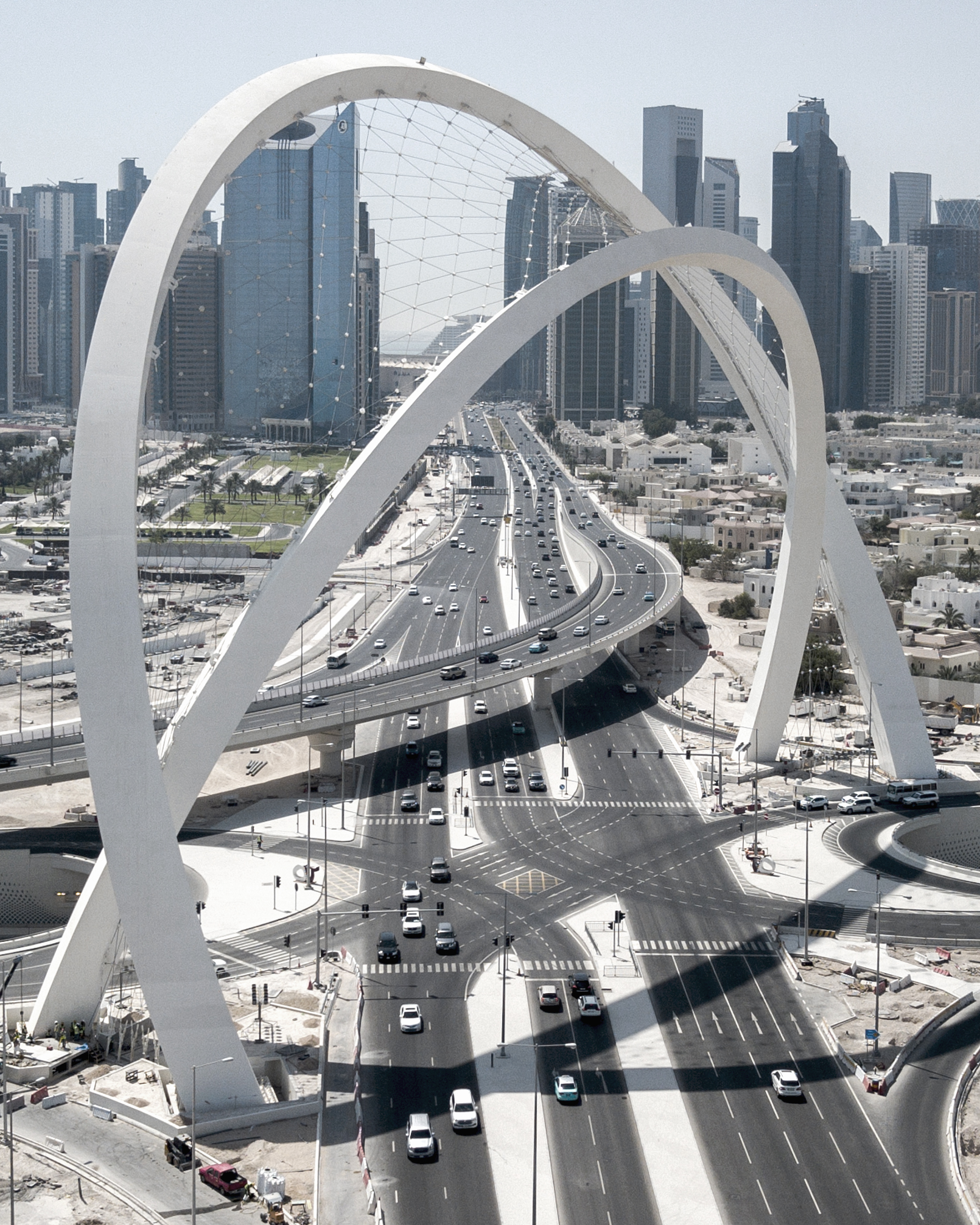
Al Wahda Arches over Lusail Expressway

Qatar is increasingly activating its logistics and ports in order to participate in trade between Europe and China or Africa. For this purpose, ports such as Hamad Port are rapidly expanded and investments are made in their technology. The country is historically and currently part of the Maritime Silk Road that runs from the Chinese coast to the south via the southern tip of India to Mombasa, from there through the Red Sea via the Suez Canal to the Mediterranean, there to the Upper Adriatic region to the northern Italian hub of Trieste with its rail connections to Central Europe, Eastern Europe and the North Sea. Hamad Port is Qatar's main seaport, located south of Doha in the Umm Al Houl area. Construction of the port began in 2010; it became operational in December 2016. Capable of handling up to 7.8 million tonnes of products annually, the bulk of trade which passes through the port consists of food and building materials. On the northern coast, Ras Laffan Port serves as the most extensive liquid natural gas export facility in the world.

Qatar has made significant progress in public transportation, with the Doha Metro being one of the most important components of the system. The metro system connects important parts of the capital, like Hamad International Airport and major business hubs, providing a convenient method of transportation. More expansions are being planned by Qatar Rail to improve connections across the region.

== Demographics ==
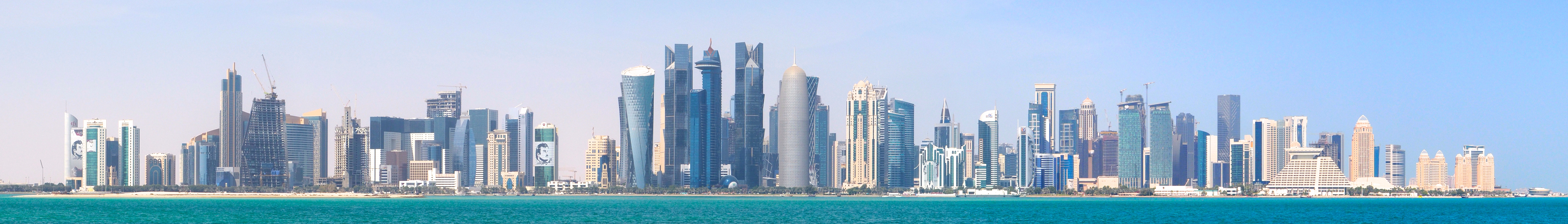
Skyline of Doha, capital and largest city of Qatar

Historical population
Year	Pop.	±%
1950	25,000	—
1960	47,000	+88.0%
1970	110,000	+134.0%
1980	224,000	+103.6%
1990	476,000	+112.5%
2000	592,000	+24.4%
2010	1,856,000	+213.5%
2019	2,832,000	+52.6%

The number of people in Qatar fluctuates considerably depending on the season, since the country relies heavily on migrant labour. In 2020, the population was over 2.8M, with foreigners making up a vast majority. Only around 340,000 (12%) were Qatari citizens, while the remaining 2.5M were expatriates.

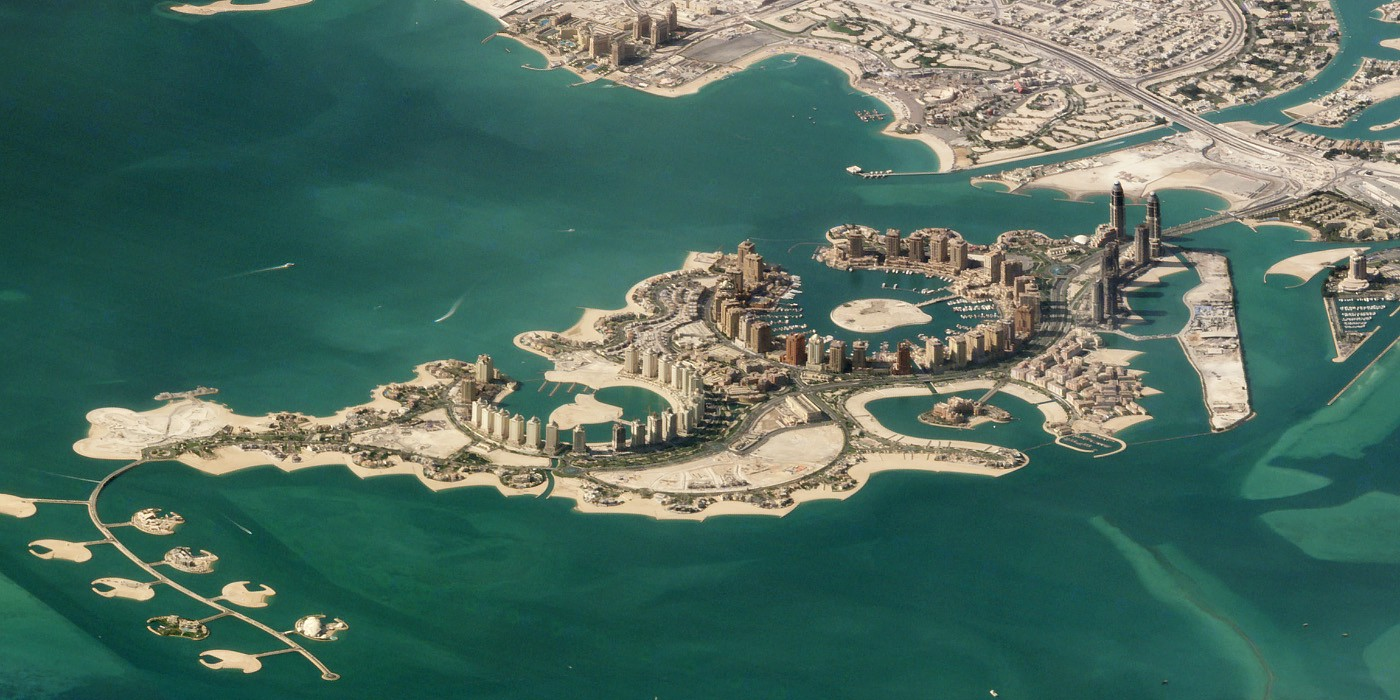
Residential buildings at the Pearl

According to a report from 2017, the combined number of South Asians (from the countries of the Indian subcontinent including Sri Lanka) represented over 1.5M people (60%). Among these, Indians were the largest community, numbering 650,000 in 2017, followed by 350,000 Nepalese, 280,000 Bangladeshis, 145,000 Sri Lankans, and 125,000 Pakistanis. The contingent of expatriates who were not of South Asian origin represented around 28% of Qatar's population, of which the largest group is 260,000 Filipinos and 200,000 Egyptians, plus many other nationalities (including nationals of other Arab countries, Europeans, etc.).

Qatar's first demographic records date back to 1892, conducted by Ottoman governors in the region. Based on this census, which includes only the residents in cities, the population in 1892 was 9,830. At the time of the first census, held in 1970, the population was 111,133. The 2020 census recorded the total population at 2,846,118, of which 2,034,518 were males and 811,600 females. The influx of male labourers has skewed the gender balance, and women are now just one-quarter of the population.

=== Languages ===
Arabic is the official language, with Qatari Arabic being the local dialect. Qatari Sign Language is the language of the native Qatari deaf community. English is commonly used as a second language, and a rising lingua franca, especially in commerce, to the extent that steps are being taken to try to preserve Arabic from English's encroachment. English is particularly useful for communication with Qatar's large expatriate community. In the medical community, and in situations such as the training of nurses to work in Qatar, English acts as a lingua franca. Reflecting the multicultural make-up of the country, many other languages are also spoken, including Malayalam, Persian, Baluchi, Brahui, Hindi, Urdu, Pashto, Kannada, Tamil, Telugu, Nepali, Sinhalese, Bengali, Tagalog, Tulu and Indonesian.

=== Religion ===
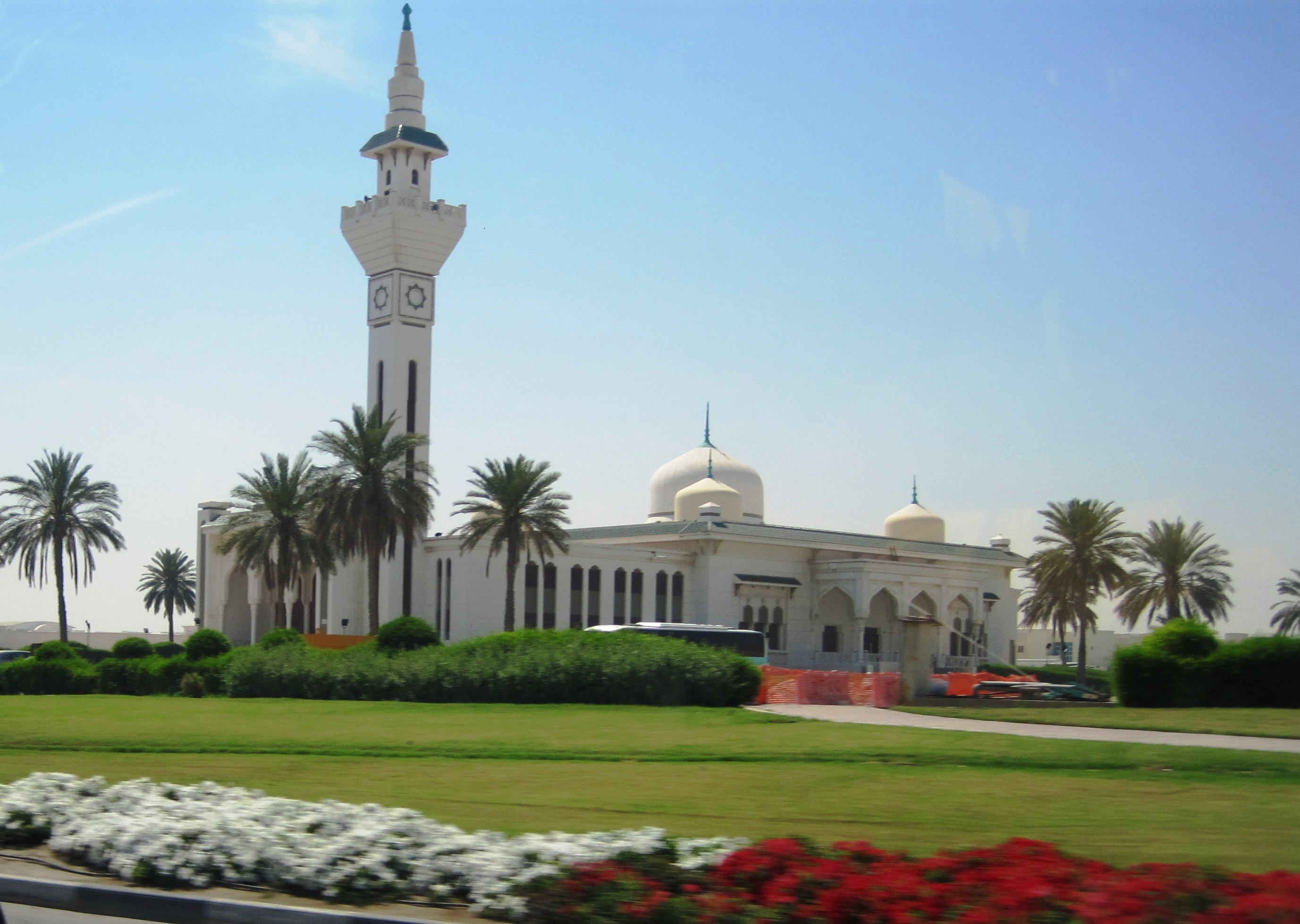
Mosque in Qatar

Islam is predominant and is the state religion, although it is not the only religion practiced in the country, and the constitution guarantees freedom to practise any faith within "moral" bounds. Most citizens belong to the Salafi Muslim movement of Wahhabism, and 5–15% of Muslims follow Shia Islam with other Islamic sects being very small in number. In 2020, Qatar's total population (citizens and non-citizens alike) was 75.9% Muslim, 12.5% Christian and 10.6% Hindu; while other religions and religiously unaffiliated people accounted for the remaining 0.9%.

Sharia is the main source of legislation according to the constitution. Qatar's interpretation of Sharia is said to be not as "strict" as neighbouring Saudi Arabia but not as "liberal" as Dubai. The vision of the Ministry of Awqaf and Islamic Affairs is "to build a contemporary Islamic society along with fostering the Sharee’ah [Sharia] and cultural heritage".

The non-Muslim population is composed almost entirely of non-citizens. Since 2008, Christians have been allowed to build churches on ground donated by the government. Active churches include the Mar Thoma Church, Malankara Orthodox Syrian Church, the Roman Catholic Church of Our Lady of the Rosary and the Anglican Church of the Epiphany. There are also two Mormon wards and a Baháʼí Faith community.

=== Education ===
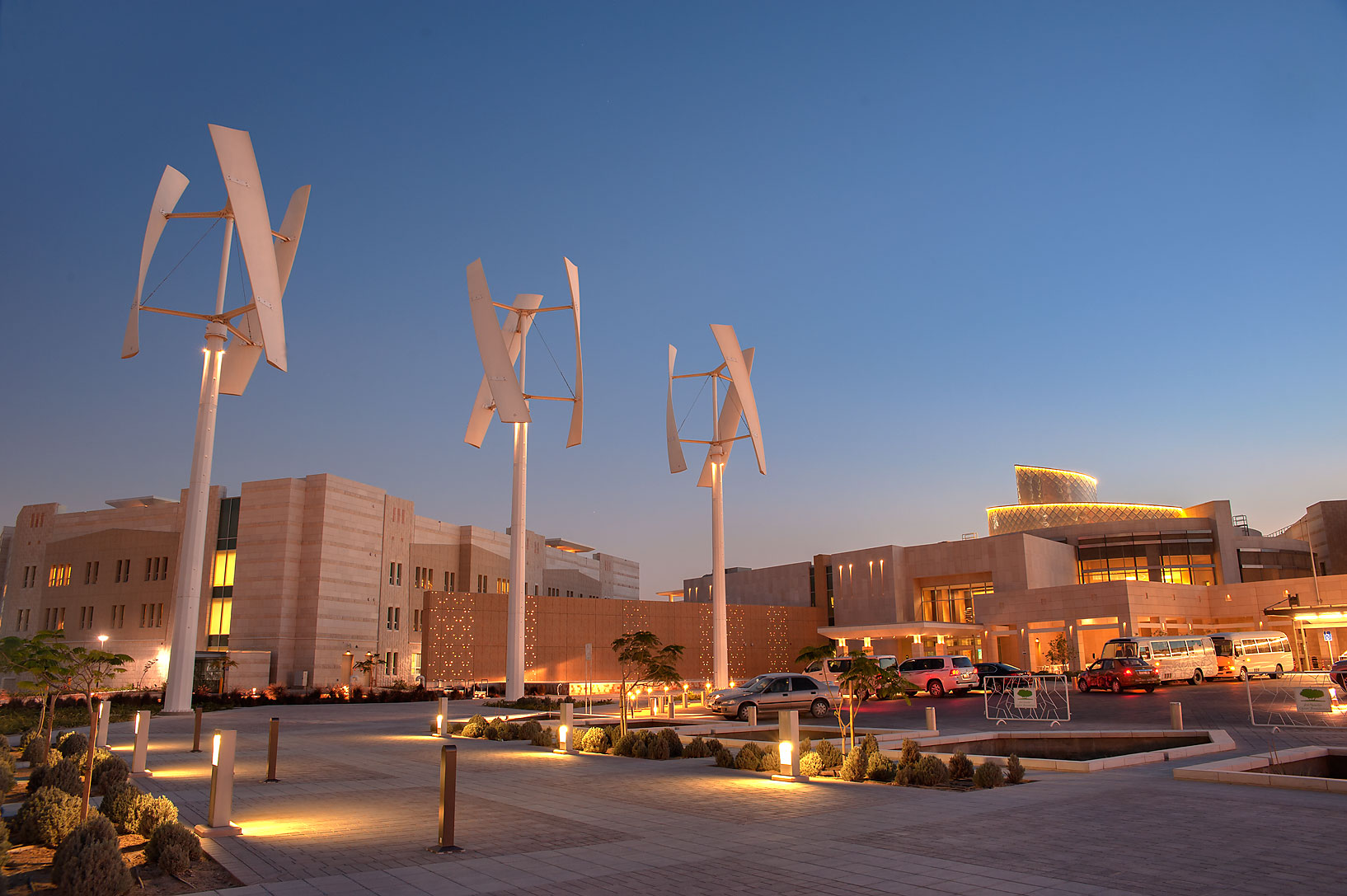
Student Center in Education City. Education City houses various educational facilities, including the satellite campuses of eight international universities.

Qatar hired the RAND Corporation to reform its K–12 education system. Through the Qatar Foundation, the country has built Education City, a campus that hosts local branches of the Weill Cornell Medical College, Carnegie Mellon School of Computer Science, Georgetown University School of Foreign Service, Northwestern's Medill School of Journalism, Texas A&M's School of Engineering, Virginia Commonwealth University School of the Arts and other Western institutions.

The illiteracy rate was 3.1% for males and 4.2% for females in 2012, the lowest in the Arabic-speaking world and 86th in the world. Citizens are required to attend government-provided education from kindergarten through high school. Qatar University, founded in 1973, is the country's oldest and largest institution of higher education.

In November 2002, Emir Hamad bin Khalifa Al Thani created The Supreme Education Council. The Council directs and controls education for all ages from the pre-school level through the university level, including the "Education for a New Era" initiative which was established to try to position Qatar as a leader in education reform. According to the Webometrics Ranking of World Universities, the top-ranking universities in the country are Qatar University (1,881st worldwide), Texas A&M University at Qatar (3,905th) and Weill Cornell Medical College in Qatar (6,855th).

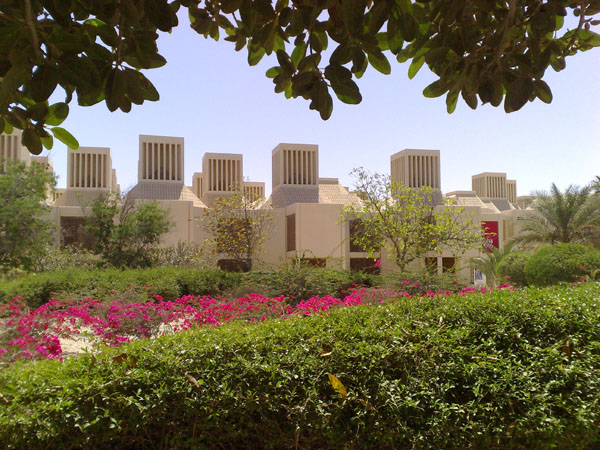
Qatar University, east view

In 2009, Qatar established the Qatar Science & Technology Park in Education City to link those universities with industry. Education City is also home to a fully accredited international Baccalaureate school, Qatar Academy. In addition, two Canadian institutions, the College of the North Atlantic (headquarters in Newfoundland and Labrador) and the University of Calgary, have inaugurated campuses in Doha. Other for-profit universities have also established campuses in the city.

In 2012, Qatar was ranked third from the bottom of the 65 OECD countries participating in the PISA test of mathematics, reading and skills for 15- and 16-year-olds, despite having the highest per capita income in the world. Qatar was ranked 48th in the Global Innovation Index in 2025, up from 65th in 2019.

As part of its national development strategy, Qatar has outlined a 10-year strategic plan to improve the level of education. The government has launched educational outreach programs, such as Al-Bairaq. Al-Bairaq was launched in 2010 aims to provide high school students with an opportunity to experience a research environment in the Center for Advanced Materials in Qatar University. The programme encompasses the STEM fields and languages.

Launched in 2006 as part of an initiative of the Qatar Foundation, the Qatar National Research Fund was created with the intent of securing public funds for scientific research. The fund functions as a means to diversify its economy from a primarily oil and gas-based one to a knowledge-based economy. The Qatar Science & Technology Park (QSTP) was established by Qatar Foundation in March 2009 as an attempt to assist the country's transition towards a knowledge economy. With a seed capital of US$800M and initially hosting 21 organisations, the QSTP became Qatar's first free-trade zone.

=== Health ===
Healthcare standards are generally high. Qatari citizens are covered by a national health-insurance plan, while expatriates must either receive health insurance from their employers, or in the case of the self-employed, purchase insurance. Government healthcare spending is among the highest in the Middle East, with US$4.7B being invested in healthcare in 2014. This was a US$2.1B increase from 2010. The premier healthcare provider is Hamad Medical Corporation, established by the government as a non-profit healthcare provider, which runs a network of hospitals, ambulance services, and a home healthcare service, all of which are accredited by the Joint Commission.

In 2010, spending on healthcare accounted for 2.2% of the country's GDP; the highest in the Middle East. In 2006, there were 23.12 physicians and 61.81 nurses per 10,000 inhabitants. The life expectancy at birth was 82.08 years in 2014, or 83.27 years for males and 77.95 years for females, rendering it the highest life expectancy in the Middle East. Qatar has a low infant mortality rate of 7 in 100,000.

In 2006, there were 25 beds per 10,000 people, and 27.6 doctors and 73.8 nurses per 10,000 people. In 2011, the number of beds decreased to 12 per 10,000 people, whereas the number of doctors increased to 28 per 10,000 people. While the country has one of the lowest proportions of hospital beds in the region, the availability of physicians is the highest in the GCC.

== Culture ==
The culture of Qatar is similar to other countries in Eastern Arabia, being significantly influenced by Islam. Qatar National Day, hosted annually on 18 December, has had an important role in developing a sense of national identity. It is observed in remembrance of Jassim bin Mohammed Al Thani's succession to the throne and his subsequent unification of the country's various tribes.

The Doha Cultural Festival is one of the cultural activities carried out annually by the Qatari Ministry of Culture, Arts and Heritage, which began in 2002 with the aim of spreading Qatari culture inside and outside Qatar.

=== Arts ===
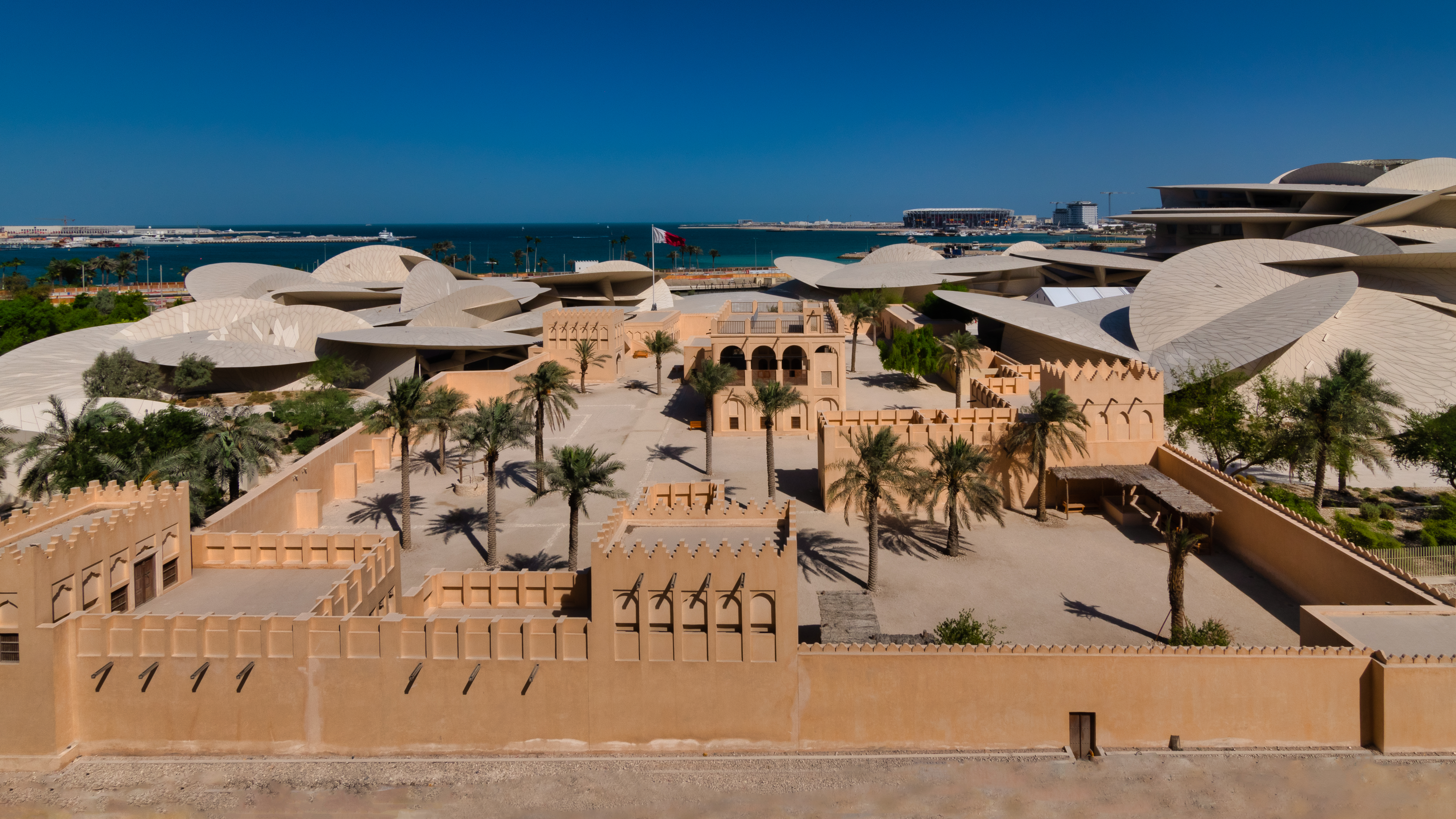
National Museum of Qatar in Doha

Qatari officials, especially the Al Thani family and the sister of the Emir of Qatar, Al-Mayassa bint Hamad bin Khalifa Al Thani, pay special attention to art. Al-Mayassa leads the Qatar Museums Authority. The Museum of Islamic Art, opened in 2008, is regarded as one of the best museums in the region. This and several other Qatari museums, like the Arab Museum of Modern Art, fall under the Qatar Museums Authority, which also sponsors artistic events abroad, such as major exhibitions by Takahashi Murakami in Versailles (2010) and Damien Hirst in London (2012).

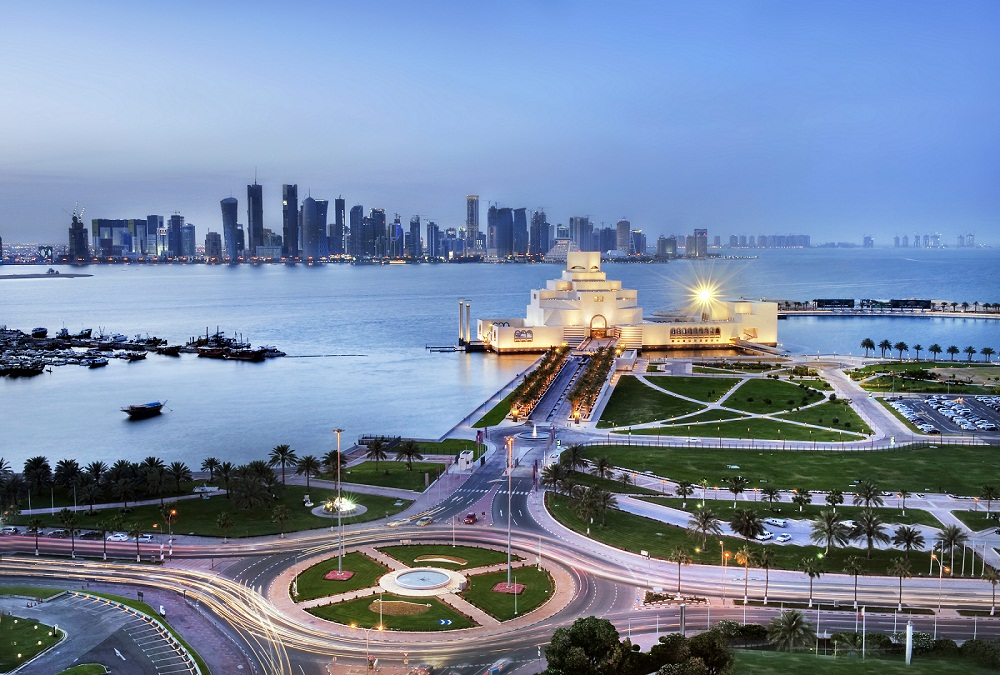
Museum of Islamic Art in Doha

Qatar is the world's biggest buyer in the art market by value. The Qatari cultural sector is being developed to enable the country to reach world recognition to contribute to the development of a country that comes mainly from its resources from the gas industry.

=== Literature ===
Qatari literature traces its origins back to the 19th century. Originally, written poetry was the most common form of expression. Abdul Jalil Al-Tabatabai and Mohammed bin Abdullah bin Uthaymeen, two poets dating back to the early 19th century, formed the corpus of Qatar's earliest written poetry. Poetry later fell out of favour after Qatar began reaping the profits from oil exports in the mid-20th century and many Qataris abandoned their Bedouin traditions in favour of more urban lifestyles.

Due to the increasing number of Qataris who began receiving formal education during the 1950s and other significant societal changes, 1970 witnessed the introduction of the first short story anthology, and in 1993 the first locally authored novels were published. Poetry, particularly the predominant nabati form, retained some importance but would soon be overshadowed by other literary types. Unlike most other forms of art in Qatari society, women have been involved in the modern literature movement to a similar extent to men.

=== Media ===
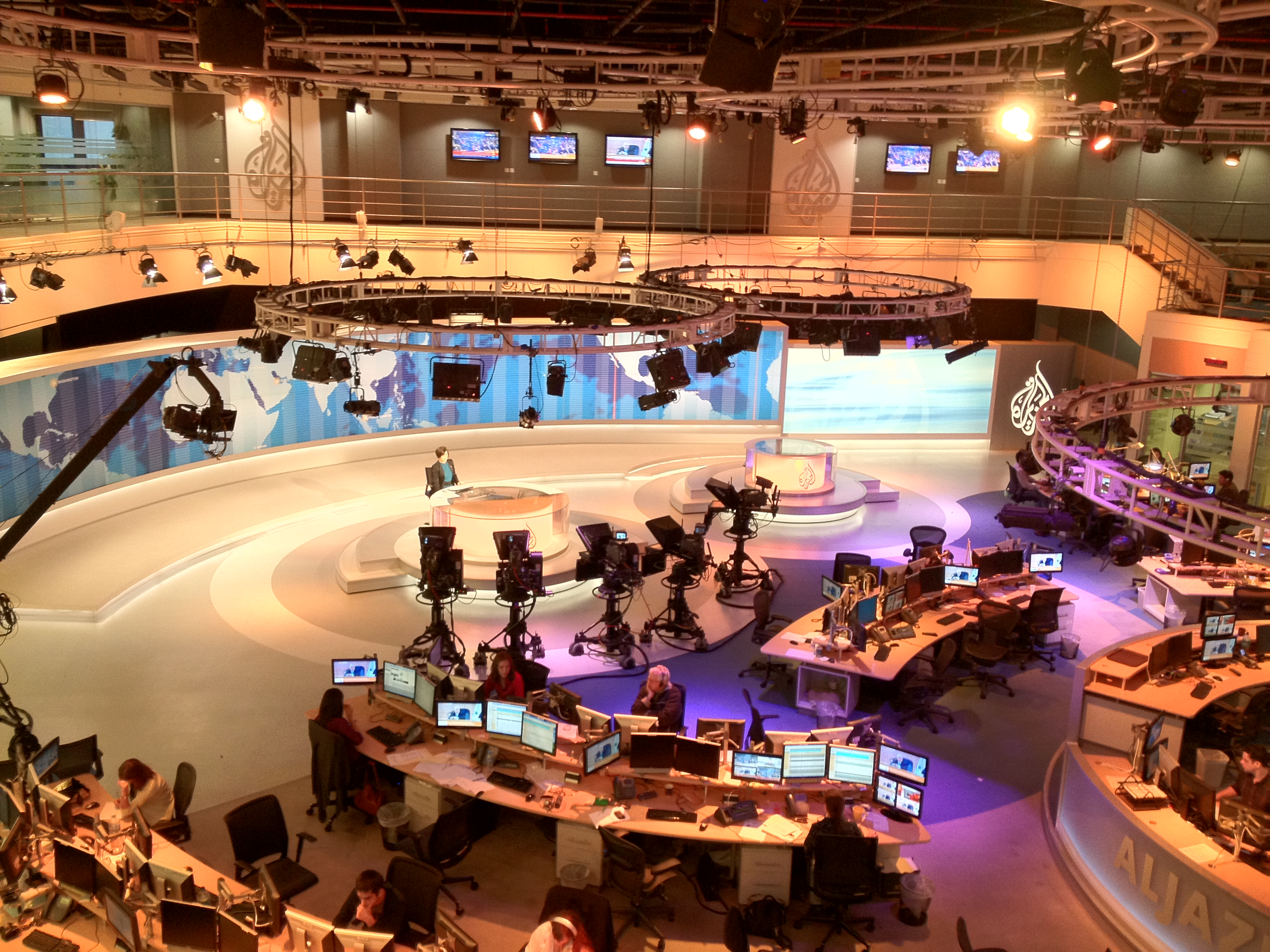
The news desk of Al Jazeera English, a Qatari news channel

Qatar's media was classified as "not free" in the 2014 Freedom of the Press report by Freedom House. Television broadcasting started in 1970 with the inauguration of Qatar TV. Al Jazeera is a main television network headquartered in Doha. Al Jazeera initially launched in 1996 as an Arabic news and current affairs satellite TV channel of the same name and has since expanded into a global network of several speciality TV channels.

It has been reported that journalists practice self-censorship, particularly in regards to the government and ruling family of Qatar. Criticism of the government, emir, and ruling family in the media is illegal. According to article 46 of the press law "The Emir of the state of Qatar shall not be criticised and no statement can be attributed to him unless under a written permission from the manager of his office." Journalists are also subject to prosecution for insulting Islam.

In 2014, a Cybercrime Prevention Law was passed. The law is said to restrict press freedom and carries prison sentences and fines for broad reasons such as jeopardising local peace or publishing false news. The Gulf Centre for Human Rights has stated that the law is a threat to freedom of speech and has called for certain articles of the law to be revoked.

Press media has undergone expansion in recent years. There are currently seven newspapers in circulation in Qatar, with four being published in Arabic and three being published in English. There are also newspapers from India, Nepal and Sri Lanka with editions printed from Qatar.

In regards to telecommunication infrastructure, Qatar is the highest-ranked Middle Eastern country in the World Economic Forum's Networked Readiness Index (NRI)—an indicator for determining the development level of a country's information and communication technologies. Qatar ranked number 23 overall in the 2014 NRI ranking, unchanged from 2013.

=== Music ===
The music of Qatar is based on Bedouin poetry, song and dance. Traditional dances in Doha are performed on Friday afternoons; one such dance is the Ardah, a stylised martial dance performed by two rows of dancers who are accompanied by an array of percussion instruments, including al-ras (a large drum whose leather is heated by an open fire), tambourines and cymbals with small drums. Other percussion instruments used in folk music include galahs (a tall clay jar) and tin drinking cups known as tus or tasat, usually used in conjunction with a tabl, a longitudinal drum beaten with a stick. String instruments, such as the oud and rebaba, are also commonly used.

=== Sport ===
Lusail Sports Arena

Education City Stadium during 2022 FIFA World Cup

Association football is the most popular sport in Qatar, both in terms of players and spectators. Shortly after the Qatar Football Association became affiliated with FIFA in 1970, one of the country's earliest international accolades came in 1981 when the Qatar national under-20 team's emerged as runners-up to West Germany in that year's edition of the FIFA World Youth Championship after being defeated 4–0 in the final. At the senior level, Qatar has played host to three editions of the AFC Asian Cup; the first being the ninth edition in 1988, the second being the fifteenth edition held in 2011, and the third being the eighteenth edition held in 2023. For the first time in the country's history, the Qatar national football team won the AFC Asian Cup in the 2019 edition hosted in the United Arab Emirates, beating Japan 3–1 in the final. They won all seven of their matches, conceding only a single goal throughout the tournament. As hosts and defending champions in the following 2023 edition, Qatar successfully retained their title, defeating Jordan in the final.

On 2 December 2010, Qatar won their bid to host the 2022 FIFA World Cup, despite never previously qualifying for the FIFA World Cup Finals. Local organisers built seven new stadiums and expanded one existing stadium for this event. Qatar's winning bid for the 2022 World Cup was greeted enthusiastically in the Persian Gulf region as it was the first time a country in the Middle East had been selected to host the tournament. At the same time, the bid was embroiled in much controversy, including allegations of bribery and interference in the investigation of the alleged bribery. European football associations also objected to the 2022 World Cup being held in Qatar for a variety of reasons, from the impact of warm temperatures on players' fitness, to the disruption it might cause in European domestic league calendars should the event be rescheduled to take place during winter. In May 2014, Qatari football official Mohammed bin Hammam was accused of making payments totalling £3 million to officials in return for their support for the Qatar bid. A FIFA inquiry into the bidding process in November 2014 cleared Qatar of any wrongdoing.

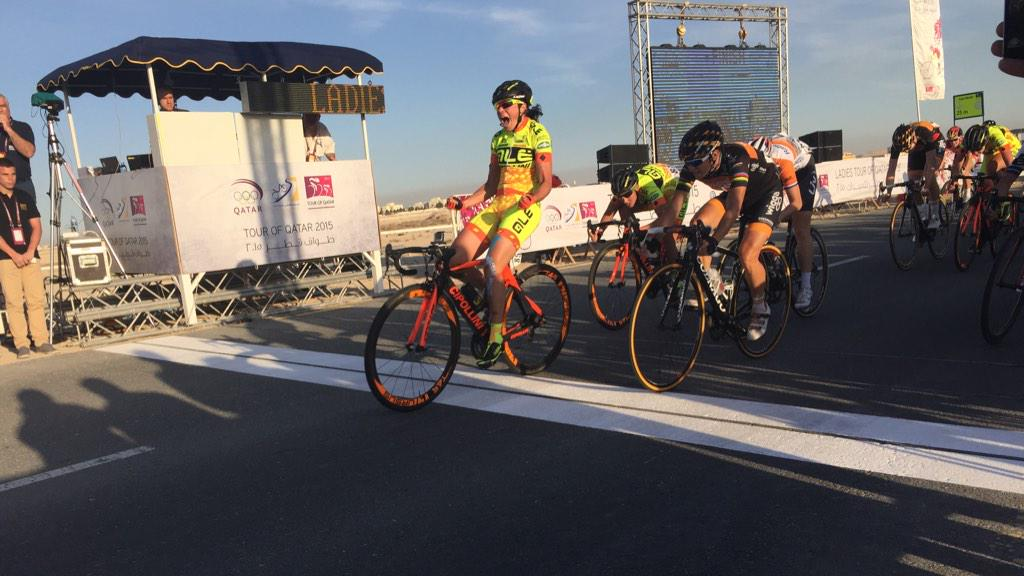
2015 Ladies Tour of Qatar

Al-Rayyan Stadium

The Guardian, a British national daily newspaper, produced a short documentary named "Abuse and exploitation of migrant workers preparing emirate for 2022". A 2014 investigation by The Guardian reported that migrant workers who had been constructing luxurious offices for the organisers of the 2022 World Cup had not been paid in over a year, and were now "working illegally from cockroach-infested lodgings". For 2014, Nepalese migrants involved in constructing infrastructure for the 2022 World Cup died at a rate of one every two days. The Qatar 2022 organising committee responded to various allegations by claiming that hosting the World Cup in Qatar would act as a "catalyst for change" in the region. According to a February 2021 article in The Guardian, some 6,500 migrant construction workers had died. However, the World Cup in Qatar was the most expensive in the competition's history and had many modern technologies, with many expressing their satisfaction with the country's handling of the tournament.

Qatar was estimated to host a football fanbase of 1.6M for the 2022 FIFA World Cup. However, the construction work in country was expected to only take the available 37,000 hotel rooms to 70,000 by the end of 2021. In December 2019, the Qatari World Cup officials approached the organisers of the Glastonbury Festival in England and the Coachella Festival in the United States, to plan huge desert campsites for thousands of football fans. The World Cup campsites on the outskirts were reported to have licensed bars, restaurants, entertainment and washing facilities. Moreover, two cruise ships were also reserved as temporary floating accommodations for nearly 40,000 people during the tournament.

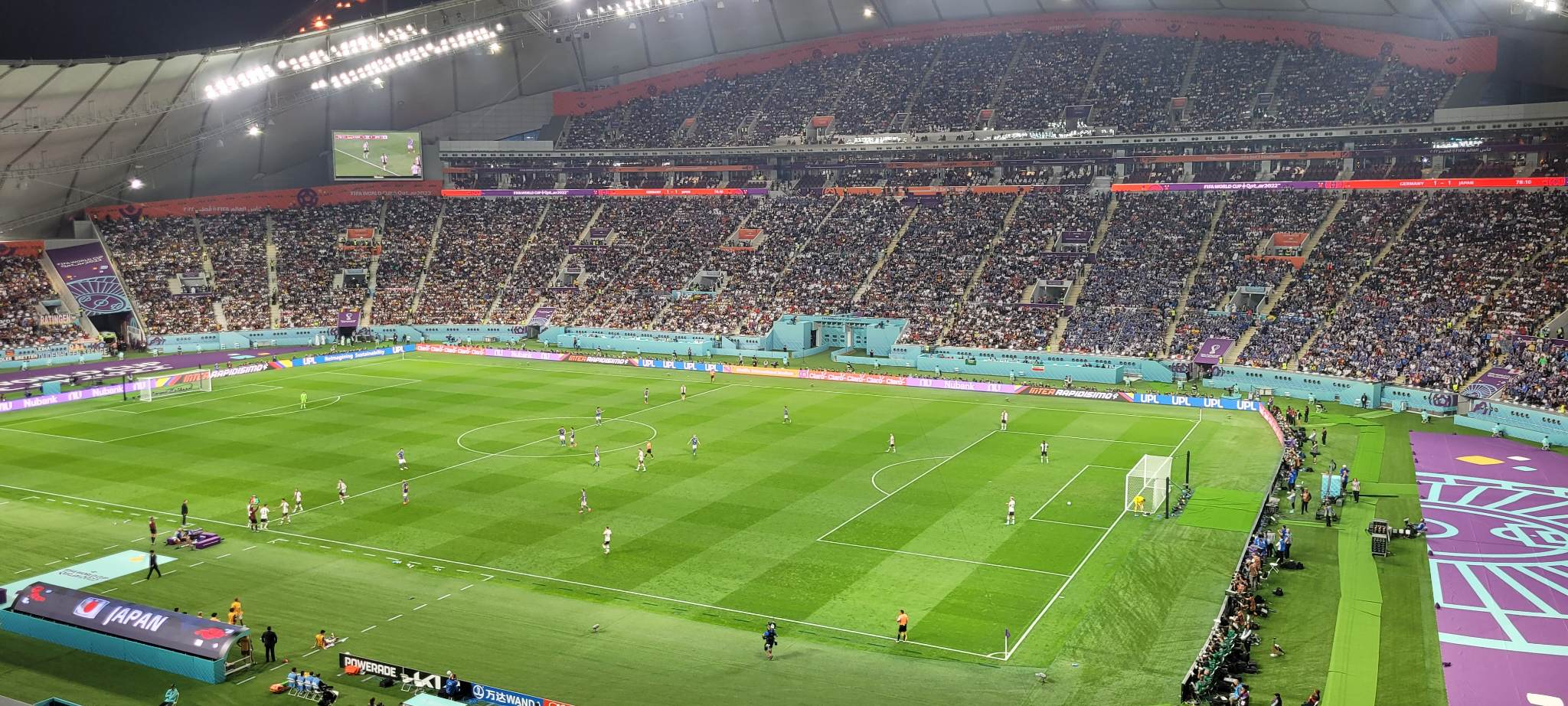
Khalifa International Stadium

Lusail Iconic Stadium with capacity of 80,000 seats

Though football is the most popular sport, other team sports have experienced considerable success at senior level. In 2015, the national handball team emerged as runners-up to France in the World Men's Handball Championship as hosts, however the tournament was marred by numerous controversies regarding the host nation and its team. Further, in 2014, Qatar won the world championship in men's 3x3 basketball.

Cricket is popular amongst the South Asian diaspora in Qatar. Casual street cricket is the most popular format of the game, but the Qatar Cricket Association has been a member of the International Cricket Council (ICC) since 1999 and the men's and women's national teams both play regularly in ICC competitions. The primary cricket ground in Qatar is the West End Park International Cricket Stadium.

Basketball is a developed sport amongst Asian people in Qatar. Qatar hosted the 2005 FIBA Asia Championship, 2013 FIBA Asia 3x3 Championship, 2014 FIBA Asia Under-18 Championship and 2022 FIBA Under-16 Asian Championship. Qatar will host the 2027 FIBA Basketball World Cup making this become the first Arab country to host the FIBA Basketball World Cup.

Khalifa International Tennis and Squash Complex in Doha hosted the WTA Tour Championships in women's tennis between 2008 and 2010. Doha holds the WTA Premier tournament Qatar Ladies Open annually. Since 2002, Qatar has hosted the annual Tour of Qatar, a cycling race in six stages. Every February, riders are racing on the roads across Qatar's flat land for six days. Each stage covers a distance of more than 100 km, though the time trial usually is a shorter distance. Tour of Qatar is organised by the Qatar Cycling Federation for professional riders in the category of Elite Men.

The Qatar Army Skydiving Team has several different skydiving disciplines placing among the top nations in the world. The Qatar National Parachute team performs annually during Qatar's National Day and at other large events, such as the 2015 World Handball Championship. Doha four times was the host of the official FIVB Volleyball Men's Club World Championship and three times host FIVB Volleyball Women's Club World Championship. Doha also hosted the Asian Volleyball Championship once.

== See also ==
- Internet in Qatar
- List of Qatar-related topics
- Outline of Qatar
