= List of Qatar-related topics =

This is a list of topics related to Qatar. Those interested in the subject can monitor changes to the pages by clicking on Related changes in the sidebar.

== Qatar ==
Qatar

- International rankings of Qatar
- Outline of Qatar
- Wikipedia:WikiProject Qatar

== Politics of Qatar ==
Politics of Qatar

- Emir of Qatar
- Deputy emir of Qatar

=== Government of Qatar ===
- Prime minister of Qatar
- Deputy Prime Minister of Qatar
- Cabinet of Qatar
- The General Secretariat for Development Planning
- Permanent Population Committee
- Qatar Fund for Development
- Qatar National Vision 2030

=== Legislature of Qatar ===
- Consultative Assembly of Qatar

=== Political parties in Qatar ===
(no political parties exist)

=== Elections in Qatar ===
- 2021 Qatari general election
- 2024 Qatari constitutional referendum

=== Foreign relations of Qatar ===
- Foreign relations of Qatar
  - Diplomatic missions in Qatar
  - Diplomatic missions of Qatar
- 2017–19 Qatar diplomatic crisis
- Qatar corruption scandal at the European Parliament
- Qatar Fund for Development
- Qatari foreign aid

=== Law enforcement in Qatar ===
- Law enforcement in Qatar
  - Qatar State Security

== Notable Qataris ==
- House of Thani

=== Qatari politicians ===
==== Current Qatari politicians ====
- Emir Tamim Bin Hamad Al Thani
- Moza bint Nasser
- Abdullah bin Hamad Al Thani
- Mohammed bin Abdulrahman bin Jassim Al Thani
- Cabinet of Qatar
  - Mohammed bin Abdulrahman bin Jassim Al Thani
  - Saoud bin Abdulrahman Al Thani
  - Khalifa bin Hamad Al Thani
  - Saad Sherida al-Kaabi
  - Ghanem bin Shaheen bin Ghanem Al Ghanim
  - Ali bin Ahmed Al Kuwari
  - Ibrahim bin Ali bin Issa Al Hassan Al Mohannadi
  - Lolwah Al-Khater
  - Ali bin Samikh Al Marri
  - Abdullah bin Hamad bin Abdullah Al Attiya
  - Mansoor bin Ebrahim bin Saad Al Mahmoud
  - Faisal bin Thani bin Faisal Al Thani
  - Mohammed bin Abdullah bin Mohammed Al Thani
  - Hamad Bin Khalifa Bin Ahmed Al-Thani
  - Abdulrahman bin Hamad bin Jassim bin Hamad Al Thani
  - Abdulla bin Abdulaziz bin Turki Al Subaie
  - Mohammed bin Ali bin Mohammed Al Mannai
  - Buthaina Bint Ali Al Jabr Al Nuaimi
  - Sultan bin Saad bin Sultan Al Muraikhi

==== Past emirs of Qatar ====
- Mohammed bin Thani
- Jassim bin Mohammed Al Thani
- Abdullah bin Jassim Al Thani
- Ali bin Abdullah Al Thani
- Ahmad bin Ali Al Thani
- Khalifa bin Hamad Al Thani
- Hamad bin Khalifa Al Thani

=== Qatari businessmen ===
- Abdul Aziz bin Nasser al-Thani
- Ali bin Towar al-Kuwari
- Ahmed bin Jassim Al Thani
- Issa Abu Issa
- Mohamed bin Abdulrahman M. Hassan Fakhro
- Nasser Al-Khelaifi

=== Qatari sportspeople ===
==== Olympic competitors for Qatar ====
- Talal Mansour
- Bilal Saad Mubarak
- Mubarak Al-Nubi
- Khamis Abdullah Saifeldin
- Ahmed Ibrahim Warsama

==== Qatari athletes ====
- Daham Najim Bashir
- Abdullah Ahmad Hassan
- Ibrahim Ismail Muftah
- James Kwalia
- Talal Mansour
- Bilal Saad Mubarak
- Mubarak Al-Nubi
- Musa Amer Obaid
- Khamis Abdullah Saifeldin
- Saif Saaeed Shaheen
- Mubarak Hassan Shami
- Mohammed Suleiman
- Majed Saeed Sultan
- Ahmed Ibrahim Warsama
- Sultan Khamis Zaman
- Khalid bin Hamad Al Thani
- Nasser Al-Attiyah

==== Qatari basketball players ====
- Hashim Zaidan

==== Qatari chess players ====
- Zhu Chen

==== Qatari weightlifters ====
- Nader Sufyan Abbas
- Said Saif Asaad
- Jaber Saeed Salem

== Buildings and structures in Qatar ==
- Amiri Diwan of the State of Qatar
- Aspire Tower
- Commercialbank Plaza
- Doha Tower
- Dubai Towers - Doha
- Old Amiri Palace, Doha
- Qatar National Convention Centre
- Qatar National Theater
- Sheraton Grand Doha Resort & Convention Hotel
- Tallest buildings in Doha
- Tornado Tower

=== Airports in Qatar ===
Airports in Qatar

- Doha International Airport
- Hamad International Airport

=== Bridges in Qatar ===
- Qatar–Bahrain Causeway

=== Forts in Qatar ===
- Al Koot Fort
- Al Wajbah Fort
- Al Zubara Fort
- Ar Rakiyat Fort
- Barzan Towers
- Qal'at Murair

=== Lighthouses in Qatar ===
Lighthouses in Qatar

- Jazirat Halul Lighthouse

=== Malls in Qatar ===
- B Square Mall
- City Center Doha
- Doha Festival City
- Ezdan mall
- Lulu Mall
- Hyatt Plaza
- Lagoona Mall
- Landmark Mall Doha
- Mall of Qatar
- Royal Plaza
- Tawar Mall
- The Mall
- Villagio Mall

=== Museums in Qatar ===
Museums in Qatar

- Mathaf: Arab Museum of Modern Art
- Museum of Islamic Art, Doha
- National Museum of Qatar
- Qatar National Museum
- Sheikh Faisal Bin Qassim Al Thani Museum

=== Places of worship in Qatar ===
- Qatar State Mosque
- Spiral Mosque

over 5000 mosques in Qatar

=== Sports venues in Qatar ===
- Khalifa International Stadium
- Lusail International Circuit
- Lusail Sports Arena
- Aspire Dome
- Hamad Aquatic Centre
- Khalifa International Tennis and Squash Complex
- West End Park International Cricket Stadium
- Doha Golf Club

==== Football venues in Qatar ====
- List of football stadiums in Qatar
- Al-Ahly Stadium
- Al-Gharrafa Stadium
- Al-Khawr Stadium
- Al-Wakrah Stadium
- Grand Hamad Stadium
- Jassim Bin Hamad Stadium
- Khalifa International Stadium
- Qatar SC Stadium
- Umm-Affai Stadium

over 20 more top class stadiums being built for the 2022 world cup

== Communications in Qatar ==
Communications in Qatar

- Internet in Qatar
- Ooredoo
- Vodafone Qatar

== Qatari culture ==
Culture of Qatar

=== Art in Qatar ===
- Qatari art
  - Collecting practices of the Al-Thani Family
  - Public art in Qatar
    - 7 (sculpture)
    - Gandhi's Three Monkeys
    - Perceval (sculpture)

=== Events in Qatar ===
- Qatar National Day

=== Festivals in Qatar ===
==== Festivals in Qatar ====
- Qatar National Day
- Al-Nafla
- Qatar National Sports Day
- Doha Tribeca Film Festival
- Art Festival of Qatar
- Qatar Masters Golf Tournament
- Qatar Open Men's Tennis Tournament
- Qatar Open Women's Tennis Tournament
- Qatar International Food Festival
- Doha Cultural Festival

=== Food in Qatar ===
- Qatari cuisine

=== Languages of Qatar ===
- Gulf Arabic

=== Literature of Qatar ===
- Qatari folklore
- Qatari literature

=== National symbols of Qatar ===
- Emblem of Qatar
- Flag of Qatar
- National anthem of Qatar

=== Qatari music ===
- Music of Qatar
- Qatar Philharmonic Orchestra

=== Religion in Qatar ===
- Religion in Qatar
  - Buddhism in Qatar
  - Christianity in Qatar
    - Catholic Church in Qatar
    - Protestantism in Qatar
  - Hinduism in Qatar
  - Islam in Qatar

=== Theatre in Qatar ===
- Theatre in Qatar

=== World Heritage Sites in Qatar ===
- World Heritage Sites in Qatar: Zubarah

== Economy of Qatar ==
Economy of Qatar

- Qatar Investment Authority
- Agriculture in Qatar
- Energy in Qatar
  - Natural gas in Qatar
  - Solar power in Qatar
- Financial services in Qatar
  - Banks in Qatar
  - Qatar Exchange
  - Qatari riyal
- Tourism in Qatar
  - Tourist attractions in Qatar
    - Katara Cultural Village
- Trade unions in Qatar
- Qatarization

=== Companies in Qatar ===
Companies of Qatar

- QatarEnergy LNG
- QatarEnergy
- Qatar Steel

== Education in Qatar ==
Education in Qatar

- Education City, Qatar
- Supreme Education Council

=== Schools in Qatar ===
- List of schools in Qatar
  - American School of Doha
  - The Cambridge School, Doha, Qatar
  - Doha College
  - Gulf English School
  - International School of Choueifat Doha
  - Qatar Academy
  - Qatar International School

over 50 schools and world known universities in Qatar Foundation

=== Universities and colleges in Qatar ===
- List of universities and colleges in Qatar
  - Carnegie Mellon University (Qatar)
  - Texas A&M University at Qatar
  - University of Qatar

== Environment of Qatar ==
- Friends of the Environment Centre
- Geology of Qatar
- Natural gas in Qatar
- Protected areas of Qatar
- Wildlife of Qatar
  - Flora of Qatar
  - Fauna of Qatar
    - Birds of Qatar
    - Mammals of Qatar

== Geography of Qatar ==
Geography of Qatar

- Bays of Qatar
  - Bay of Zekreet
  - Doha Bay
- Demographics of Qatar
- Hills of Qatar
- Islands of Qatar
- Peninsulas of Qatar
- Salt flats of Qatar
- Time in Qatar
- Wadis of Qatar

=== Cities and towns in Qatar ===
- Cities in Qatar
- Al Wakrah
- Ar Rayyan
- Doha
- Dukhan
- Lusail
- Mesaieed
- Zubarah

=== Municipalities of Qatar ===
- Municipalities of Qatar
  - Al Daayen
  - Al Khor
  - Al Rayyan
  - Al-Shahaniya
  - Al Shamal
  - Al Wakrah
  - Doha
    - Communities in Doha
  - Umm Salal

=== Zones of Qatar ===
- Zones of Qatar

== History of Qatar ==
History of Qatar

- Archaeology of Qatar
  - Archaeological sites in Qatar
    - Al Da'asa
    - Jebel Jassassiyeh
    - Murwab
    - Wadi Debayan
- Timeline of Doha
  - Doha Declaration

== Human Rights in Qatar ==
Human rights in Qatar

- Human rights abuses in Qatar
- National Human Rights Committee
- Qatari human rights activists
- Human rights organisations based in Qatar
- Freedom of religion in Qatar
- Slavery in Qatar
- Human rights issues involving the 2022 FIFA World Cup
- Human trafficking in Qatar
- Kafala system in Qatar
- Women's rights in Qatar
  - Women in Qatar
  - Abortion in Qatar
  - Prostitution in Qatar
- Capital punishment in Qatar
- LGBTQ rights in Qatar
- Voiceless Victims
- Tayeb Benabderrahmane v. Qatar

== Qatari media ==
Media of Qatar

- Internet in Qatar
- Newspapers in Qatar
- Television in Qatar
  - Al Jazeera
- Qatar News Agency

=== Al Jazeera ===
- Al Jazeera
- Al Jazeera Arabic
- Al Jazeera English
- Al Jazeera America
- AJ+
- Al Jazeera Children's Channel
- Al Jazeera International
- Al Jazeera Live
- Al Jazeera Urdu
- Al Jazeera bombing memo
- Control Room (film)
- David Frost
- Akram Khozam
- Rageh Omaar
- Veronica Pedrosa
- Barbara Serra

== Military of Qatar ==
Military of Qatar

- Qatar Emiri Air Force
  - Al Udeid Air Base
  - Doha International Air Base
- Qatar Armed Forces
- Qatari Emiri Navy
- Military ranks of Qatar
- Wars involving Qatar
  - 2025 Iranian strikes on Al Udeid Air Base
  - Israeli attack on Doha

== Organisations based in Qatar ==
- Global Dryland Alliance
- Qatar Foundation
- Qatar Red Crescent Society
- The Scout and Guide Association of Qatar

== Public parks and gardens in Qatar ==
- Al Bidda Park
- Aspire Park

== Qatari society ==
- Demographics of Qatar
- Qataris
- Healthcare in Qatar
  - Hospitals in Qatar
- Public holidays in Qatar
  - Qatar National Day
- Qatari nationality law

== Sport in Qatar ==
Sport in Qatar

- ASPIRE Academy for Sports Excellence
- Qatar national basketball team

=== Football in Qatar ===
- Football in Qatar
- 1988 AFC Asian Cup
- 2022 FIFA World Cup
- 2025 FIFA U-17 World Cup
- 2026 FIFA U-17 World Cup
- Agony of Doha
- Qatar Football Association
- Qatar football league system
  - Qatar Stars League
  - Qatargas League
- Qatar National First Division
- Qatar national football team
- Qatar national under-17 football team
- Qatar national under-20 football team
- Qatari Second Division
- Qatari Top Scorers

==== Qatari football clubs ====
- Al-Ahli Sports Club
- Al-Arabi Sports Club
- Al-Gharrafa
- Al Rayyan Sports Club
- Al-Sadd
- Al-Siliya
- Al-Wakra
- Khor (football club)
- Qatar Sports Club
- Umm-Salal Sports Club

=== Golf tournaments in Qatar ===
- Qatar Masters
  - Doha Golf Club

=== Qatar at the Olympics ===
- Qatar at the Olympics
  - Qatar at the 1984 Summer Olympics
  - Qatar at the 1992 Summer Olympics
  - Qatar at the 2000 Summer Olympics
  - Qatar at the 2004 Summer Olympics

=== Tennis tournaments in Qatar ===
- Qatar ExxonMobil Open
- Qatar Total Open

=== Motor sports tournaments in Qatar ===
- Qatar Grand Prix
  - 2021 Qatar Grand Prix
- Qatar motorcycle Grand Prix
- 2019 Superbike World Championship round 13
- Oryx Cup

== Transport in Qatar ==
Transport in Qatar

- Doha Metro
- Al Majd Road

=== Airlines of Qatar ===
- List of airlines of Qatar
  - Qatar Airways
  - Qatar Amiri Flight
  - Qatar Executive

=== Travel in Qatar ===
- Qatari passport
- Visa policy of Qatar
  - Visa requirements for Qatari citizens

== See also ==
- Lists of country-related topics - similar lists for other countries
