= Outline of Qatar =

Country in West Asia

The Flag of Qatar

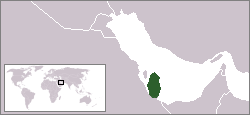
The location of Qatar

The following outline is provided as an overview of and topical guide to Qatar:

The State of Qatar is a sovereign Arab emirate located in West Asia on the Qatari Peninsula protruding from the northeasterly coast of the much larger Arabian Peninsula. It is bordered by Saudi Arabia to the south; otherwise the Persian Gulf surrounds the state.

== General reference ==
Map of Qatar and its municipalities

- Pronunciation:
- Common English country name: Qatar
- Official English country name: The State of Qatar
- Common endonym(s): Katar
- Official endonym(s): Dawlat Qatar
- Adjectival(s): Qatari
- Demonym(s):
- Etymology: Name of Qatar
- International rankings of Qatar
- ISO country codes: QA, QAT, 634
- ISO region codes: See ISO 3166-2:QA
- Internet country code top-level domain: .qa

== Geography of Qatar ==
Geography of Qatar

- Qatar is: a country
- Location:
  - Northern Hemisphere and Eastern Hemisphere
  - Eurasia
    - Asia
      - Southwest Asia
  - Middle East
    - Arabian Peninsula
      - Qatar Peninsula
  - Time zone: UTC+03
  - Extreme points of Qatar
    - High: Qurayn Abu al Bawl 103 m (338 ft)
    - Low: Persian Gulf 0 m
  - Land boundaries: Saudi Arabia 60 km
  - Coastline: Persian Gulf 563 km
- Population of Qatar: 2,174,035 - 142nd most populous country
- Area of Qatar: 11,437 km^{2}
- Atlas of Qatar

=== Environment of Qatar ===
- Climate of Qatar
- Renewable energy in Qatar
- Geology of Qatar
- Natural gas in Qatar
- Protected areas of Qatar
  - Biosphere reserves in Qatar
  - National parks of Qatar
    - Umm Tais National Park
- Wildlife of Qatar
  - Flora of Qatar
  - Fauna of Qatar
    - Birds of Qatar
    - Mammals of Qatar

==== Natural geographic features of Qatar ====
- Islands of Qatar
- Lakes of Qatar
- Mountains of Qatar: None
  - Volcanoes in Qatar
- Rivers of Qatar
  - Waterfalls of Qatar
- Valleys of Qatar
- World Heritage Sites in Qatar: None

=== Regions of Qatar ===
Regions of Qatar

==== Ecoregions of Qatar ====
List of ecoregions in Qatar

- Ecoregions in Qatar

==== Administrative divisions of Qatar ====
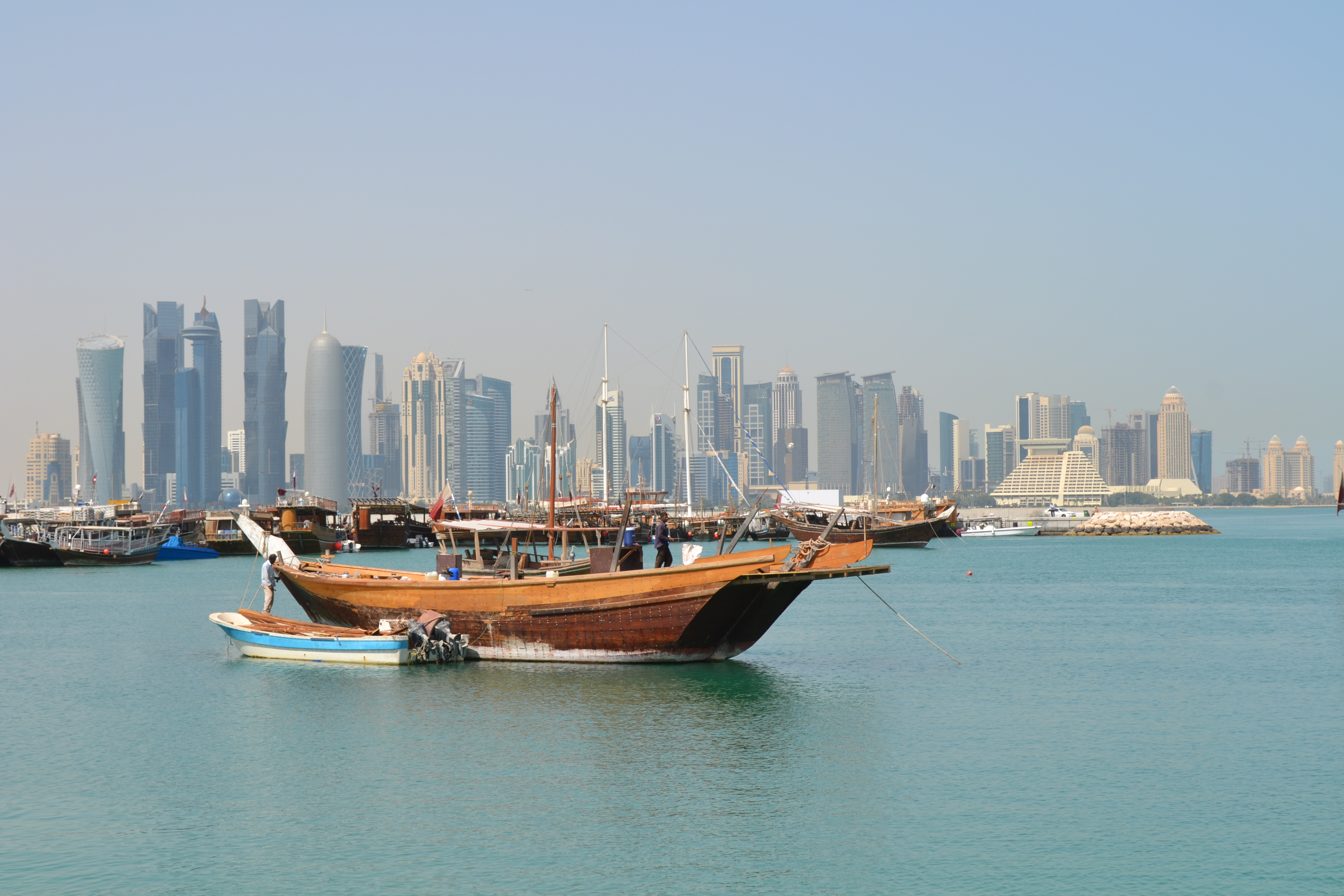
Skyline of Doha

Administrative divisions of Qatar

- Municipalities of Qatar

===== Municipalities of Qatar =====
Municipalities of Qatar

- Capital of Qatar: Doha
- Cities of Qatar

=== Demography of Qatar ===
Demographics of Qatar

== Government and politics of Qatar ==
Politics of Qatar

- Form of government:
- Capital of Qatar: Doha
- Elections in Qatar
- Political parties in Qatar

=== Branches of the government of Qatar ===
Government of Qatar

==== Executive branch of the government of Qatar ====
- Head of state: Sheikh Tamim bin Hamad Al Thani
- Head of government: Prime Minister of Qatar,
- Cabinet of Qatar

==== Legislative branch of the government of Qatar ====
- Consultative Assembly of Qatar (unicameral)

==== Judicial branch of the government of Qatar ====
Court system of Qatar

- Supreme Court of Qatar

=== Foreign relations of Qatar ===
Foreign relations of Qatar

- Diplomatic missions in Qatar
- Diplomatic missions of Qatar
- Qatar Fund for Development
- Qatari foreign aid

==== International organization membership ====
The State of Qatar is a member of:

- Arab Bank for Economic Development in Africa (ABEDA)
- Arab Fund for Economic and Social Development (AFESD)
- Arab Monetary Fund (AMF)
- Cooperation Council for the Arab States of the Gulf (GCC)
- Food and Agriculture Organization (FAO)
- Group of 77 (G77)
- International Atomic Energy Agency (IAEA)
- International Bank for Reconstruction and Development (IBRD)
- International Chamber of Commerce (ICC)
- International Civil Aviation Organization (ICAO)
- International Criminal Police Organization (Interpol)
- International Development Association (IDA)
- International Federation of Red Cross and Red Crescent Societies (IFRCS)
- International Finance Corporation (IFC)
- International Fund for Agricultural Development (IFAD)
- International Hydrographic Organization (IHO)
- International Labour Organization (ILO)
- International Maritime Organization (IMO)
- International Mobile Satellite Organization (IMSO)
- International Monetary Fund (IMF)
- International Olympic Committee (IOC)
- International Organization for Standardization (ISO)
- International Red Cross and Red Crescent Movement (ICRM)
- International Telecommunication Union (ITU)
- International Telecommunications Satellite Organization (ITSO)
- Inter-Parliamentary Union (IPU)
- Islamic Development Bank (IDB)
- League of Arab States (LAS)
- Multilateral Investment Guarantee Agency (MIGA)
- Nonaligned Movement (NAM)
- Organisation of Islamic Cooperation (OIC)
- Organisation for the Prohibition of Chemical Weapons (OPCW)
- Organization of American States (OAS) (observer)
- Organization of Arab Petroleum Exporting Countries (OAPEC)
- Organization of Petroleum Exporting Countries (OPEC)
- Permanent Court of Arbitration (PCA)
- United Nations (UN)
- United Nations Conference on Trade and Development (UNCTAD)
- United Nations Educational, Scientific, and Cultural Organization (UNESCO)
- United Nations Industrial Development Organization (UNIDO)
- United Nations Interim Force in Lebanon (UNIFIL)
- Universal Postal Union (UPU)
- World Customs Organization (WCO)
- World Federation of Trade Unions (WFTU)
- World Health Organization (WHO)
- World Intellectual Property Organization (WIPO)
- World Meteorological Organization (WMO)
- World Tourism Organization (UNWTO)
- World Trade Organization (WTO)

=== Law and order in Qatar ===
Law of Qatar

- Constitution of Qatar
- Crime in Qatar
  - Abortion in Qatar
  - Cannabis in Qatar
  - Human trafficking in Qatar
- Human rights in Qatar
  - LGBT rights in Qatar
  - Freedom of religion in Qatar
- Law enforcement in Qatar
  - Qatar State Security

=== Military of Qatar ===
Military of Qatar

- Command
  - Commander-in-chief:
    - Ministry of Defence of Qatar
- Forces
  - Army of Qatar
  - Navy of Qatar
  - Air Force of Qatar
  - Special forces of Qatar
- Military history of Qatar
- Military ranks of Qatar

=== Local government in Qatar ===
Local government in Qatar

== History of Qatar ==
History of Qatar

- Archaeology of Qatar
- Timeline of Doha
- Timeline of the history of Qatar

=== History of Qatar, by subject ===
- History of the Jews in Qatar
- Military history of Qatar

== Culture of Qatar ==
Culture of Qatar

- Architecture of Qatar
- Cuisine of Qatar
- Festivals in Qatar
- Languages of Qatar
  - Gulf Arabic
- Media of Qatar
- National symbols of Qatar
  - Emblem of Qatar
  - Flag of Qatar
  - National anthem of Qatar
- People of Qatar
- Prostitution in Qatar
- Public holidays in Qatar
- Records of Qatar
- Religion in Qatar
  - Buddhism in Qatar
  - Christianity in Qatar
  - Hinduism in Qatar
  - Islam in Qatar
- World Heritage Sites in Qatar: Zubarah

=== Art in Qatar ===
- Art in Qatar
  - Collecting practices of the Al-Thani Family
  - Public art in Qatar
- Cinema of Qatar
- Literature of Qatar
- Music of Qatar
- Qatari folklore
- Television in Qatar
- Theatre in Qatar
  - Qatar National Theater

=== Sport in Qatar ===
Sport in Qatar

- Football in Qatar
  - List of football stadiums in Qatar
- Qatar at the Olympics

== Economy and infrastructure of Qatar ==
Economy of Qatar

- Economic rank, by nominal GDP (2007): 60th (sixtieth)
- Agriculture in Qatar
- Communications in Qatar
  - Internet in Qatar
- Companies of Qatar
- Currency of Qatar: Riyal
  - ISO 4217: QAR
- Energy in Qatar
  - Energy policy of Qatar
  - Natural gas in Qatar
- Financial services in Qatar
  - Banks in Qatar
  - Qatar Exchange
- Healthcare in Qatar
- Mining in Qatar
- Tourism in Qatar
- Transport in Qatar
  - Airports in Qatar
  - Rail transport in Qatar
  - Roads in Qatar
    - Orbital Highway
- Water supply and sanitation in Qatar

== Education in Qatar ==
Education in Qatar

- List of schools in Qatar
- List of universities and colleges in Qatar
- The Supreme Education Council
- Ministry of Education

== See also ==
- Qatar
- List of international rankings
- List of Qatar-related topics
- Member state of the United Nations
- Outline of Asia
- Qatar diplomatic crisis
- Outline of geography
