= Qatar at the Islamic Solidarity Games =

- IOC code: QAT
- NOC: Qatar Olympic Committee
- Medals Ranked 16th: Gold 11 Silver 11 Bronze 19 Total 41

Islamic Solidarity Games appearances (overview)
- 2005; 2013; 2017; 2021; 2025

Qatar has competed in all editions of the Islamic Solidarity Games since its debut appearance at the inaugural event in Mecca in 2005. As of 2025, figures reported by the Islamic Solidarity Sports Federation indicate that athletes from Qatar have earned a total of 41 medals, comprising 11 gold, 11 silver, and 19 bronze. In the overall standings, Qatar ranks 16th in the medal table following the most recent Islamic Solidarity Games, which were hosted in Riyadh, Saudi Arabia.

== Medal tables ==
=== Medals by Islamic Solidarity Games ===
Host nation

Below is the table representing all Qatari medals in the games. Until now, Qatar has won 41 medals (11 gold, 11 silver, and 19 bronze).

Games	Athletes	Gold	Silver	Bronze	Total	Rank	Notes	RF
(Saudi Arabia) 2005 Mecca		1	0	0	1	21st	details	
(Iran) 2010 Tehran	Canceled							
(Indonesia) 2013 Palembang		1	2	2	5	16th	details	
(Azerbaijan) 2017 Baku		2	3	7	12	16th	details	
(Turkey) 2021 Konya		4	3	5	12	13th	details	
(Saudi Arabia) 2025 Riyadh		3	3	5	11	18th	details	
(Malaysia) 2029 Selangor	Future event							
Total		11	11	19	41	16th	―	―

== See also ==
- Qatar at the Olympics
- Qatar at the Paralympics
- Qatar at the Asian Games
- Qatar at the Arab Games
- Sports in Qatar
