= List of festivals in Qatar =

This article contains list of Qatar festivals.

== Religious festivals ==
- Ramadan
- Eid al-Fitr
- Eid al-Adha
- Al-Nafla

== National celebrations day ==
- Qatar National Day
- Qatar National Sports Day

== Specific festivals ==
- Doha Tribeca Film Festival
- Art Festival of Qatar
- Qatar Masters Golf Tournament
- Qatar Open Men's Tennis Tournament
- Qatar Open Women's Tennis Tournament
- Qatar International Food Festival
- 7th Qatar International Art Festival

== Annual festivals ==
- Doha Cultural Festival

== See also ==
- Culture of Qatar
- Qatari art
- Public holidays in Qatar
- Sport in Qatar
