= Qatar at the Arab Games =

- IOC code: QAT
- NOC: Qatar Olympic Committee
- Medals Ranked 9th: Gold 86 Silver 80 Bronze 112 Total 278

Arab Games appearances (overview)
- 1985; 1992; 1997; 1999; 2004; 2007; 2011; 2023; 2027

Qatar has participated in the Arab Games since the sixth edition, held in Rabat during the 1985 Arab Games. Since then, Qatari athletes have won a total of 278 medals across the history of the Games, including 86 gold, 80 silver, and 112 bronze medals, placing Qatar ninth in the overall Arab Games medal table. Qatar’s best performance came at the 12th edition of the Games, which it hosted in Doha, where the nation finished fourth in the medal standings with 30 gold medals.

== Medal tables ==
=== Medals by Arab Games ===
Host nation

Below is a table representing all Qatari medals around the games. Till now, Qatar has won 278 medals around the games history.

Games	Gold	Silver	Bronze	Total	Rank	Notes	RF
(Egypt) 1953 Alexandria	Did not participate						
(Lebanon) 1957 Beirut	Did not participate						
(Morocco) 1961 Casablanca	Did not participate						
(Egypt) 1965 Cairo	Did not participate						
(Syria) 1976 Damascus	Did not participate						
(Morocco) 1985 Rabat	2	2	2	6	9th	details	
(Syria) 1992 Damascus	8	3	4	15	6th	details	
(Lebanon) 1997 Beirut	9	6	2	17	8th	details	
(Jordan) 1999 Amman	11	11	22	44	8th	details	
(Algeria) 2004 Algiers	3	5	18	26	12th	details	
(Egypt) 2007 Cairo	14	13	13	40	6th	details	
(Qatar) 2011 Doha	30	38	40	108	4th	details	
(Algeria) 2023 Algiers (5 cities)	9	2	11	22	8th	details	
Total	86	80	112	278	9th	–	

== See also ==
- Qatar at the Olympics
- Qatar at the Paralympics
- Qatar at the World Games
- Qatar at the Asian Games
- Qatar at the Islamic Solidarity Games
- Sports in Qatar
