= 7th Qatar International Art Festival =

Art fair in Qatar

- Status: Completed
- Begins: December 7, 2025
- Ends: December 12, 2025
- Venue: Katara Cultural Village
- Location: Doha
- Country: Qatar
- Founder: Rashmi Agarwal
- Previous event: 2024 (6th)
- Next event: 2026 (8th)
- Participants: 450
- Attendance: 10,000 visitors
- Sponsor: Qatar Airways
- Website: www.qiaf.net/program

7th Qatar International Art Festival also known as QIAF 2025 was an art fair exhibition hosted in Qatar from the 7–12 December 2025. The festival focused on art pieces done by artists from all over the world. For the exhibition, 450 artists from more than 70 countries showcased their art at the fair, showcasing over 2000 artworks. The event was sponsored by Qatar Airways.

== Timeline ==
The 7th Qatar International Art festival was held at the Katara Cultural Village. The event was a six-day event, organised in collaboration with Maps International, taking place from December 7 to 12. Katara Dr Khalid bin Ibrahim Al Sulaiti, the general manager of the Cultural Village Foundation, opened the festival. The festival was held in conjunction with the 2025 FIFA Arab Cup. Rashmi Agarwal was the chief executive officer of the festival. This was the fourth time that the British Council and QIAF partnered together.

A cultural evening on December 8 featured dances and music from various different countries and cultures. Argentina sent 97 artists to the festival as part of its Year of Culture program. Interactive workshops were held by international artists on December 8–9. An art conference and interactive dialogues took place on December 9. A dinner commemorating cultural connections between the artists was organized December 10. On December 11, a sustainable fashion show and art auction were held. Finally, on December 12, the QIAF Awards Ceremony was held.

Attendance for the festival was over 10,000.
