= Friends of the Environment Centre =

- Founded: October 7, 1992
- Type: Environmental organization
- Headquarters: Qatar

Friends of the Environment Centre (FEC) is an environmental organization established in 1992 in Qatar with the goal of promoting environmental awareness and developing conservation initiatives. As of 2015, the organization is chaired by Saif Al Hajari.

== History ==
The organization was formed in October of 1992.

== Activities ==
The FEC has taken an active role in raising local awareness of the negative effects associated with tobacco smoking. Methods employed include organizing international conferences and preparing studies detailing its economic, health and environmental effects.

An annual event known as A Flower Each Spring is organized by the FEC to promote environmental awareness. During the event, numerous field trips and fairs are held with the aim of acquainting participants with Qatar's local fauna. The inaugural edition took place in 1999.

In November 2012, a conference known as the Children's Conference on Climate Change (C4) was jointly launched by the FEC and Kainat Foundation. Operating in a similar manner to Model United Nations, the purpose of the event was to provide a platform for youth to discuss environmental problems and solutions.

FEC, in partnership with South African company Sasol, launched the Qatar e-Nature application for smart phones in December 2013. Initially, the application only contained a database of the flora, birds and insects present within the country. Its database was updated in November 2014 to cover local mammals and reptiles. In April 2015, the application was conferred the "Best Arab Government Smart Application" award at the Smart Government Awards.

It was announced in May 2015 that the organization had released the first-ever field guide to birds in Qatar. The book contains information and depictions of 323 bird species that appear in the country.
