= List of wadis of Qatar =

Qatar does not have any permanent rivers, but instead has numerous wadis. Wadis are defined as dry river valleys which experience intermittent water flow during the rainy season.

The Ministry of Municipality and Environment has recorded a total of 306 wadis scattered throughout Qatar.

Some of the most prominent wadis are:

- Wadi Asmah
- Wadi Al Banat
- Wadi Debayan
- Wadi Diyab
- Wadi Ghirban
- Wadi Huwaila
- Wadi Lusail
