= Qurayn Abu al Bawl =

Mountain in Qatar

- Tuwayyir al Hamir
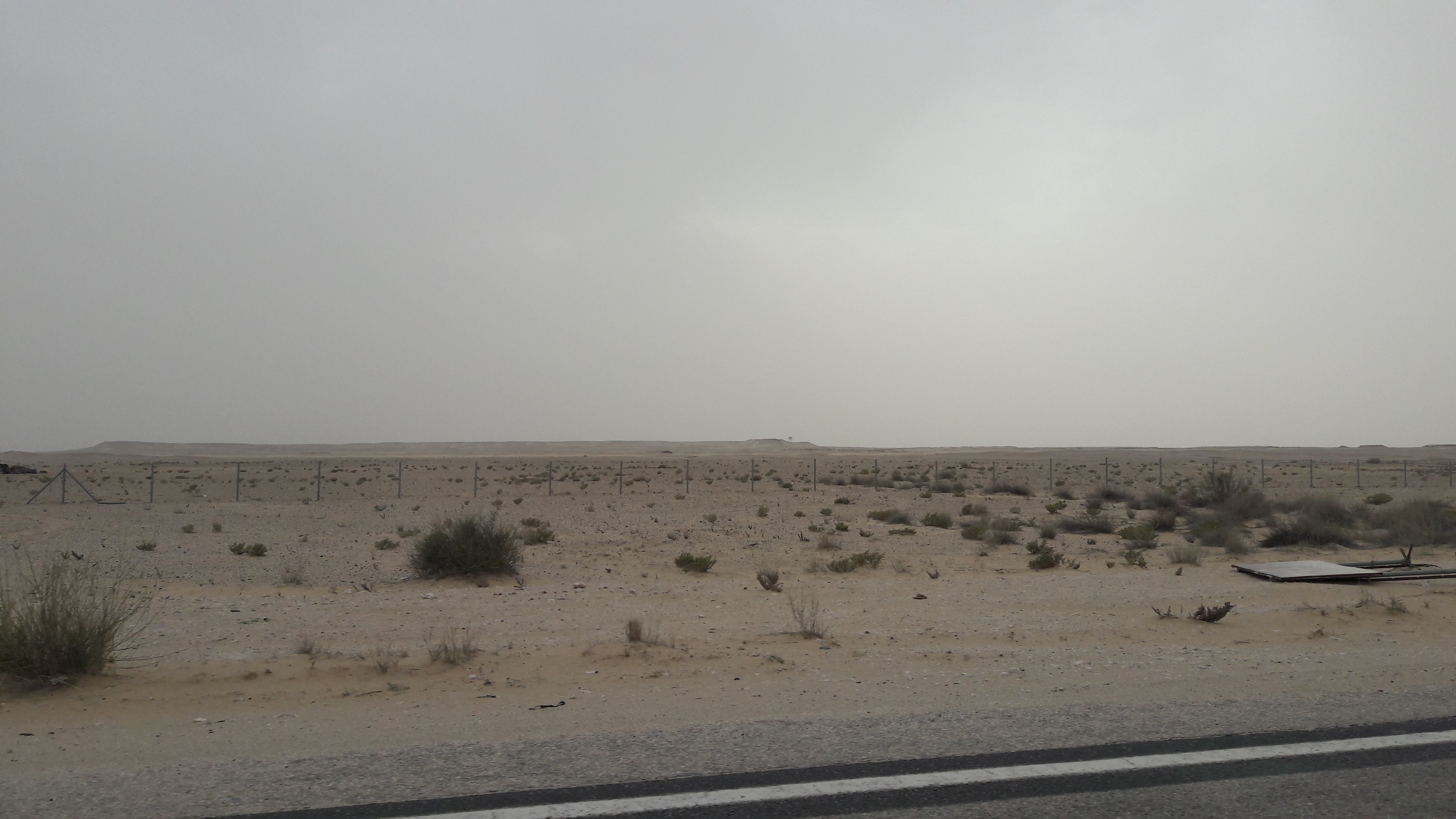
- Far view of the hill from Qatar-UAE Road

Highest point
- Elevation: 103 m (338 ft)
- Listing: Country high point
- Coordinates: 24°43′04″N 51°02′51″E

Naming
- Native name: قرين أبو البول (Arabic)

Geography
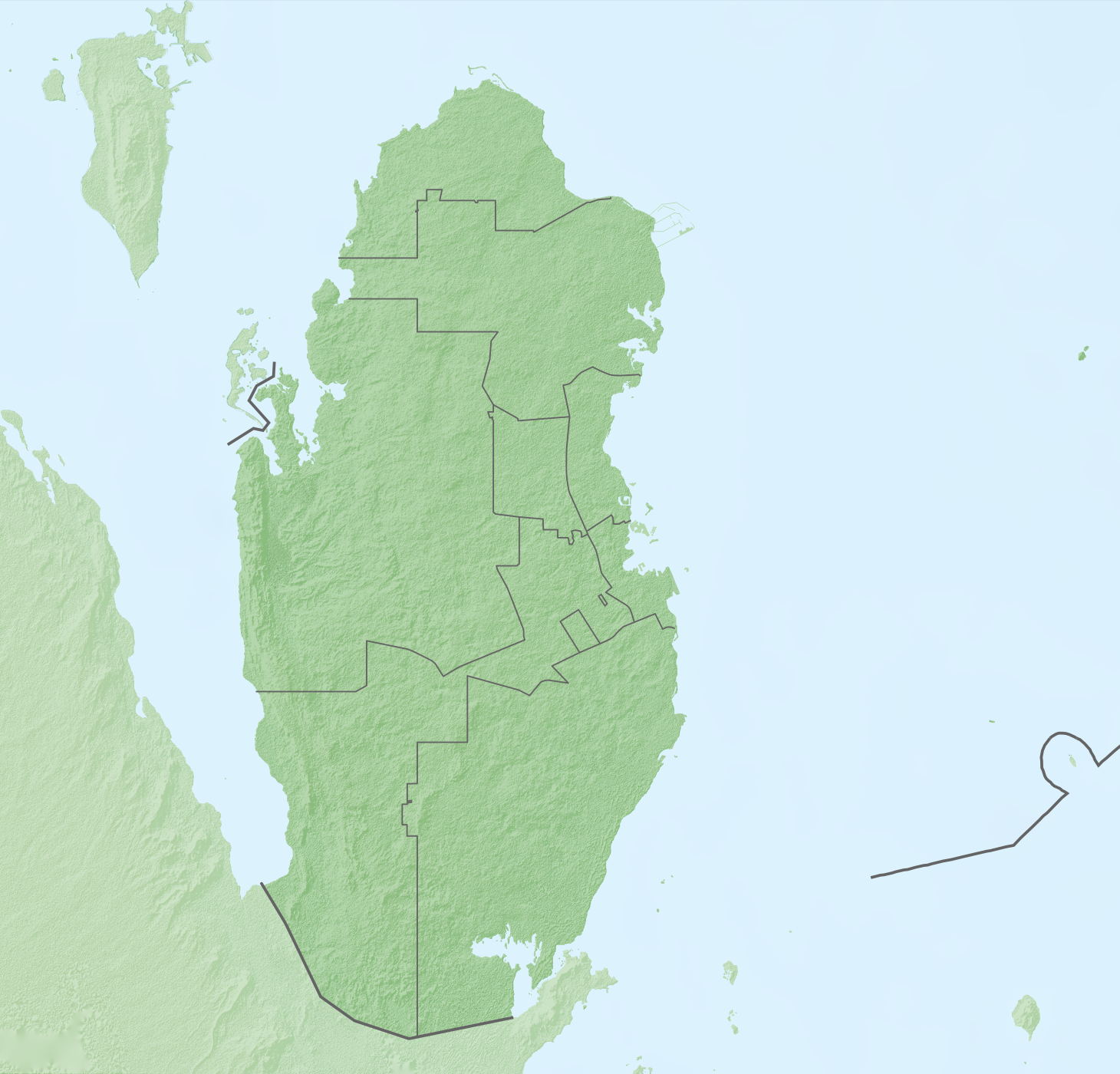
- Location within Qatar Location within Persian Gulf
- Location: Qatar

Geology
- Mountain type: Hill

Qurain Abu al-Bawl (also Gurain al Balbul, Gurain al Bâlbûl, Qurain Abul Bul, Qurayn Aba al Bawl, Qurayn Abā al Bawl, Tuwayyir al Hamir) is the highest point of Qatar, with an altitude of 103 metres (338 ft). It is located south of the peninsula near the border to Saudi Arabia.

== Etymology ==
"Qurain" is interchangeable with "Qarn", the Arabic word which roughly corresponds to sandy, flat hillock. The second part of the name, romanized either as "Abu al-Bawl" or "Balboul", was chosen as the hill is thought to represent the shape of a traditional flat-shaped toy known as balboul. An English transliteration of the name could be Balboul Hill or Balboul Benchmark.

== See also ==
- Geography of Qatar
- List of elevation extremes by country
