= Agriculture in Qatar =

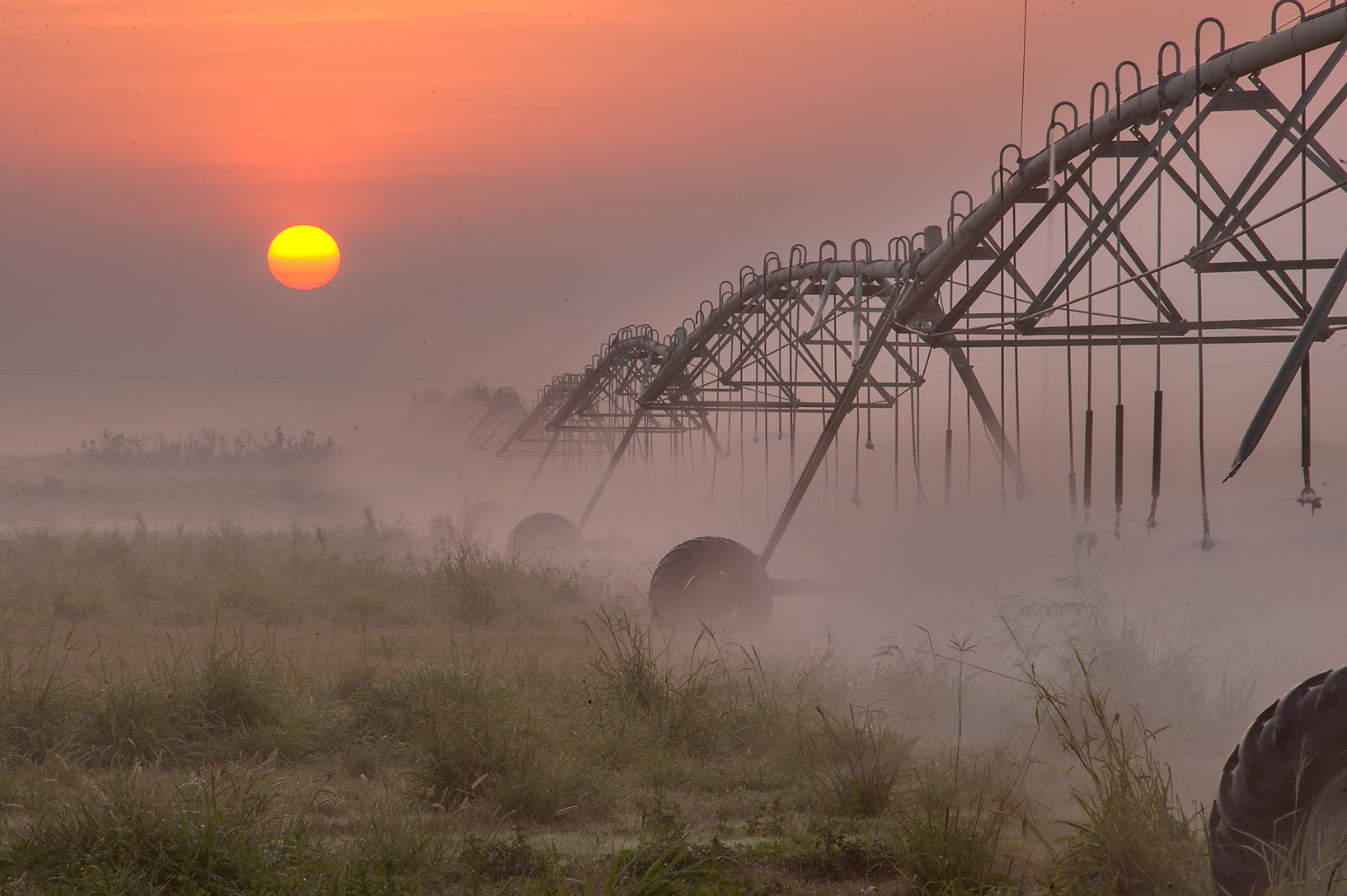
Center-pivot irrigation system at Al Rekayya Farms in central Qatar

Agriculture in Qatar is inherently limited in scope due to the harsh climate and lack of arable land. In spite of this, small-scale farming, nomadic herding, and fishing were the predominant means of subsistence in the region prior to the 20th century. Sea-based activities such as pearling and fishing served as the primary sources of income for Qataris until the commencement of oil drilling in 1939.

Although the relative importance of these activities has declined as a means of livelihood (with commercial pearling disappearing completely), the government has attempted to encourage agriculture and fishing to provide a degree of self-sufficiency in food.

== History ==
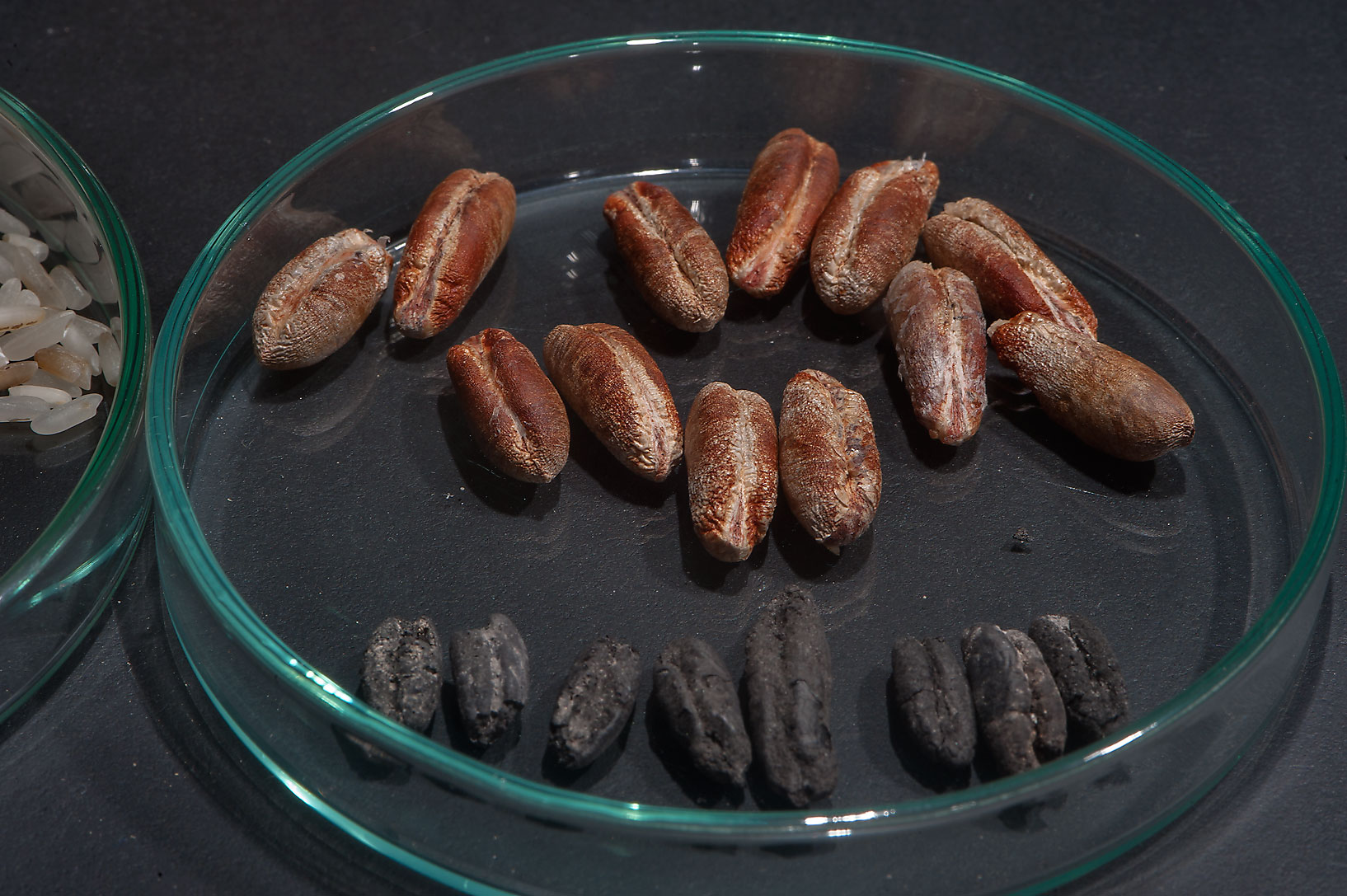
Old dates on display at Zubarah Museum

Date palms were one of the earliest crops to be cultivated in the peninsula. Beginning in the Bronze Age, the trading of dates had a significant impact on the Qatari economy. Date palm leaves were also commonly used as a construction material. However, as Qatar's geography and climate was unsuitable for large-scale crop cultivation, the bartering of date products had a lesser impact on Qatar's revenues than pearling did. As the waters surrounding Qatar contain some of the most abundant pearling beds in the world, this was the main source of income for Qatar's inhabitants until the discovery of oil in the 20th century. Pearl trading was supplemented in some areas by camel breeding. Fishing also played an important role in the economy.

J.G. Lorimer's wrote about the role of agriculture for settled villagers in 1908 in his Gazetteer of the Persian Gulf:

"The principal and almost the exclusive source of livelihood in Qatar is pearl-fishing, supplemented in some places by the breeding of camels. Agriculture hardly exists. The only date palms-- and they are not numerous-- appear to be those in the gardens at Laqta, Markhiyah, Mushairib, Na'aijah, Sakkak, Sakhamah and Wakrah; and it is not clear that any vegetable gardens exist except at some of the same places, A few semi-wild clumps of dates are found on the west coast near Dohat-as-Salwa. Besides camels the settled villagers have a few horses and cattle, which they keep in their own possession, and some sheep and goats which are tended for them by the Bedouins. They also fish along the coast of the district.

These remarks are not intended to apply to the Bedouins of Qatar, who are pastoral in their habits, like the rest of their race elsewhere, and own livestock in the proportions usual among Arab nomads."

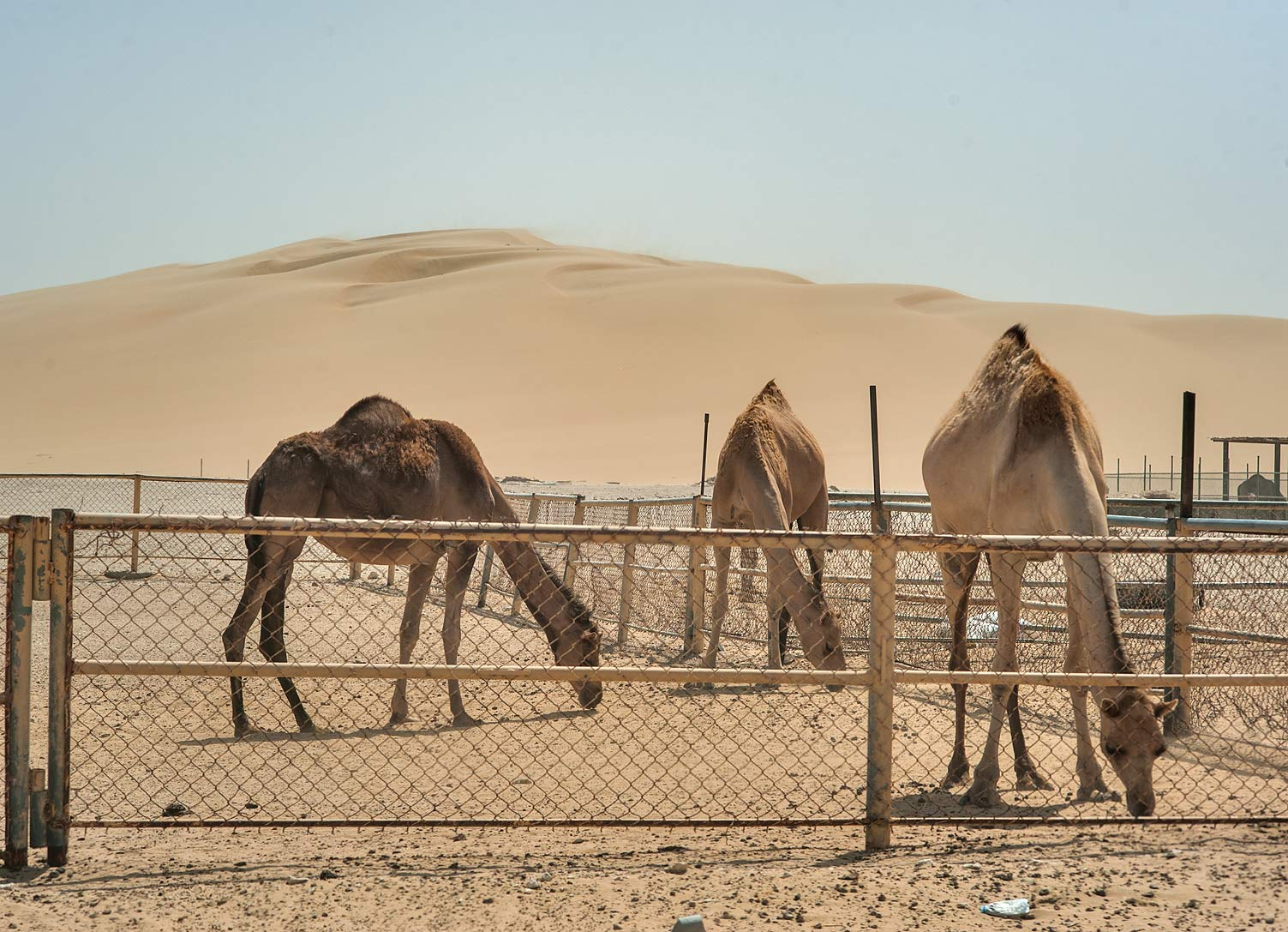
A camel farm in southern Qatar

Inventory of agricultural resources in 1908
City	Fishing boats	Camels	Horses
Khor Hassan	5	20	0
Abu Dhalouf	10	30	0
Ar Ru'ays	10	20	4
Fuwayrit	12	100	20
Al Thakhira	5	10	0
Al Khor	30	100	0
Simaisma	10	70	6
Al Daayen	10	60	10
Lusail	3	70	20
Doha	90	800	150
Al Wakrah	30	150	40

After Qatar began reaping significant monetary returns from oil drilling in the 1950s to 1960s, the number of Qataris employed in agriculture witnessed a decline, as the country now had the means to import large amounts of food.

When food prices started rising in the early 1970s, Qatar realized the importance of attaining food self-sufficiency. At the beginning of 1974, the emirate requested the Arab Organization for Agricultural Development to send researchers to study it and corroborate their results with those of an earlier UN report of the country's terrestrial and marine resources. After nearly half a year of study starting in July 1974, the research mission submitted its report to the government in November 1974. In September of that year, Qatar created a committee that would examine ways to help boost the country's agricultural development. A report released by Qatar's ministries, also in 1974, disclosed that agriculture only accounted for 0.65% of all contributions to Qatar's GDP.

In March 1985 the Agricultural and Water Research Department, in collaboration with the Arab Center for the Studies of Arid Zones and Dry Lands, initiated a project in Qatar to explore the use of seawater for agricultural purposes. The project aimed to conserve natural resources, specifically soil and water, and to develop effective soil and water management practices suited to local conditions. The initiative involved utilizing saltwater with salinity levels ranging from 2,000 to 10,000 parts per million for agricultural use.

== Cultivation and livestock ==
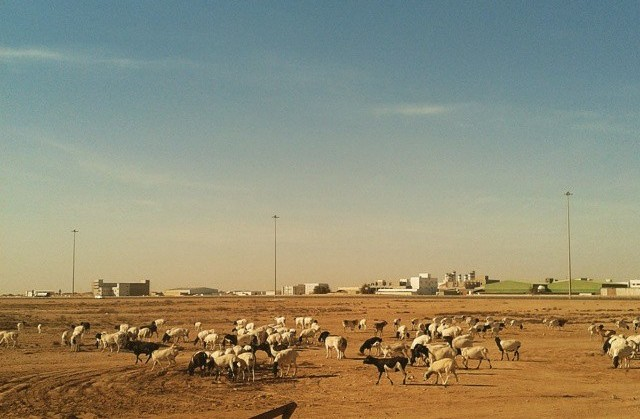
Goats grazing on the arid desert terrain

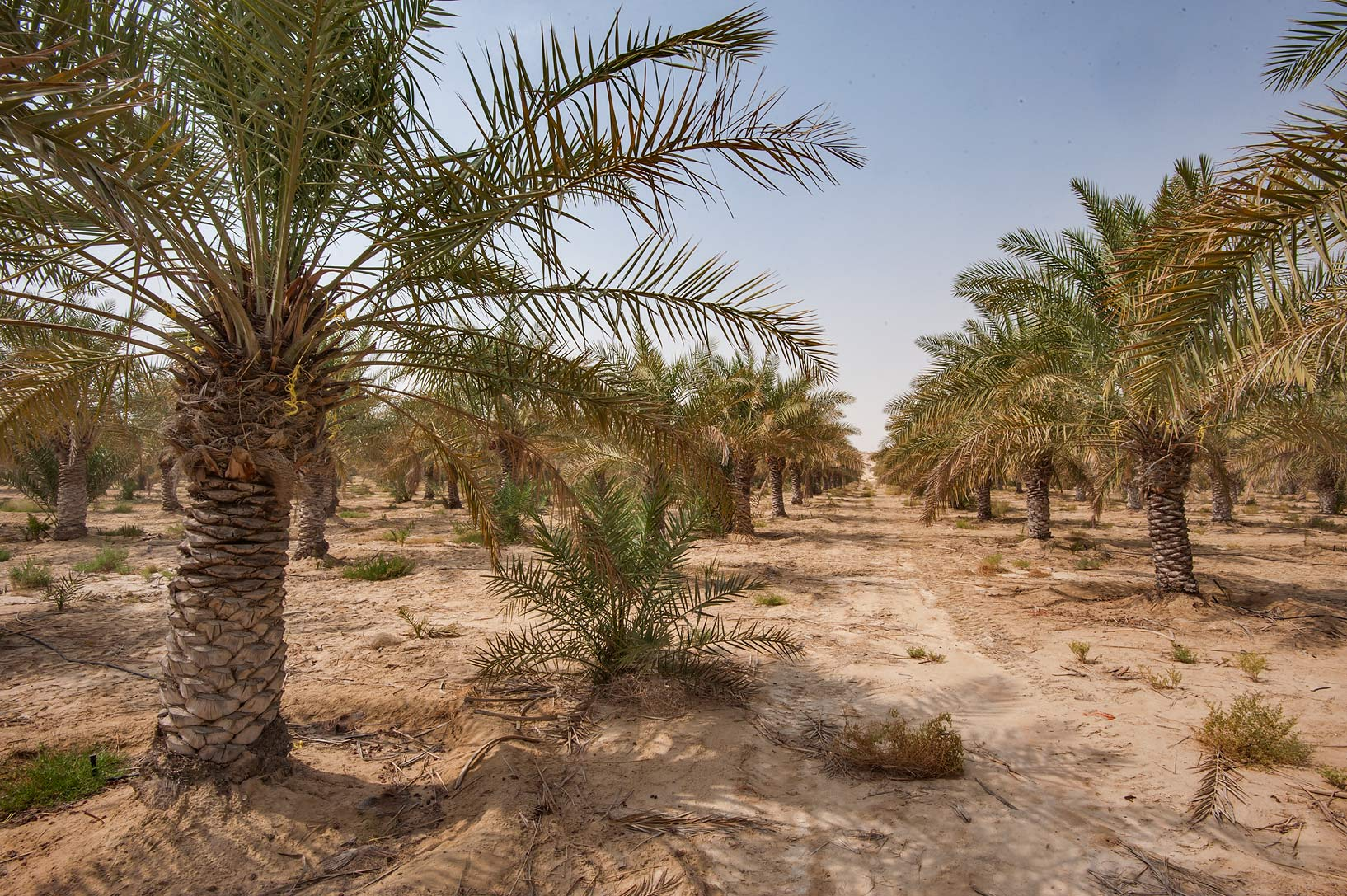
Date palm plantation in Al Mashabiya, southern Qatar

As of 2015, only 2.5% (28,000 ha.) of the land in Qatar was arable or suitable for use as pastureland. However, this is a major increase from the two prior decades. In 1996, 8,312 ha. of land were arable, while in 1980 only 2,256 ha. were arable.

Farming currently plays only a minor role in the economy. Of the 8,312 ha. of arable land in 1994, 2,345 ha. were used to cultivate permanent crops, while 5,987 ha. were used to grow annual crops. Date palms were the most abundant permanent crop. Root vegetables such as carrots, potatoes, onions and fodder beets are also some of the most important crops produced by Qatari farms.

Between 1960 and 1970 agriculture grew. The number of farms, for example, increased fourfold to 411. The number of farms more than doubled by June 1986 when it was reported that there were 883 farms. Qataris who own agricultural land or properties generally hold government jobs and hire Pakistanis or non-Qatari Arabs to manage their farms. The government operates one experimental farm.

Of land under cultivation in 1990, about 48 percent was used for vegetables (23,000 tons produced), 33 percent for the production of dates and other fruits, (8,000 tons), 11 percent for fodder (70,000 tons), and 8 percent for grains (3,000 tons). In 1990 the country had approximately 128,000 heads of sheep, 78,000 goats, 24,000 camels, 10,000 cattle and 1,000 horses. There were also dairy farms and about 2,000 chickens for poultry. All but 20 percent of local demand for eggs were met domestically. Despite the encouragement of agriculture and fishing, these two elements of the economy together produced only about 1 percent of the gross domestic product in 1989.

In July 2017, following the closure of Qatar's only land border with Saudi Arabia, the country announced plans to airlift 4,000 cows in a bid to meet around one-third of its dairy demand. Local company Baladna will be responsible for the dairy production. Later, Baladna announced that it will be importing an additional 10,000 cows so that they can meet Qatar's dairy requirements in full by 2018. Domestic production of meats, dairy products, and crops increased by 400% from June 2017, the onset of Qatar's diplomatic spat, to March 2018, according to the Ministry of Municipality and Environment. Nearly all (98%) the demand for poultry is being met.

By 2019, Qatar's vegetable output increased by 20% since mid-2017 to 66,000 tonnes per year. It is expected to further increase by 20,000-40,000 tonnes by 2020. Prior to the embargo, Qatar produced only 20% and 10% of its dairy and poultry needs respectively. By 2019, the country became self-sufficient.

=== Date syrup ===
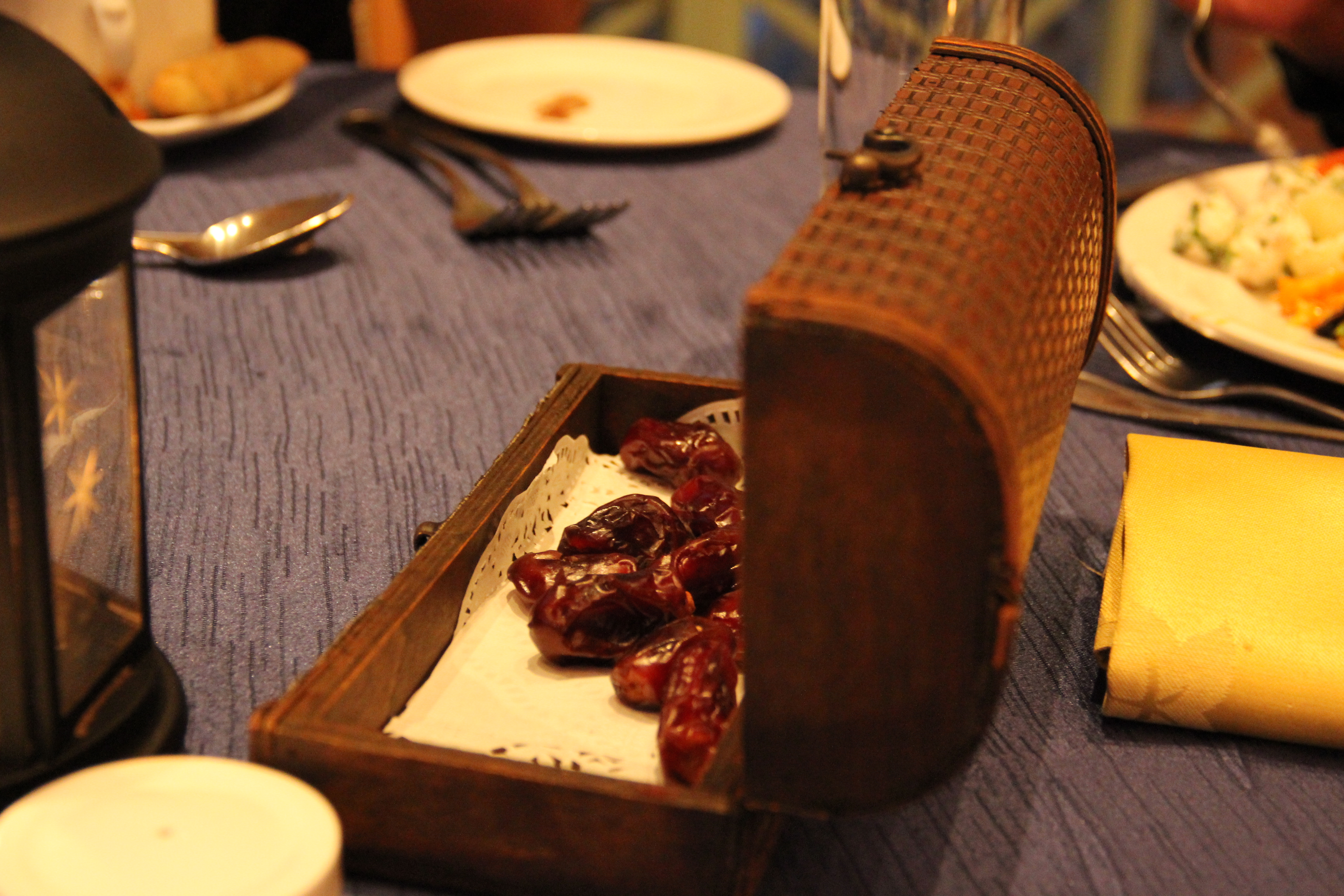
Boxed dates

The manufacturing of date syrup is one of the oldest industries in Qatar, dating back to at least the 17th century. Qatar's natural landscape can support only a few types of agriculture, and date palms are among them. The syrup was obtained by using a traditional date press called madabis or madbasa. Due to its high-calorie content and nutrient density, it was a cheap and quick source of energy for the locals, particularly pearl divers.

With a short harvesting season for dates, the production of date syrup allowed for their preservation and prolonged consumption. This syrup served both civil and commercial purposes, being traded as a commodity and providing sustenance during periods of tribal conflicts and unrest. While modernization and lifestyle changes initially led to a decline in date syrup consumption, recent trends toward health-conscious alternatives have sparked renewed interest in this traditional sweetener.

=== Soils ===
Qatar's soils vary in texture, ranging from sandy loam to heavy calcareous clay. The majority of cultivation occurs on clay loam soil. However, there are numerous problems with this soil, including high salinity levels, low amounts of nutrients, and a bad water infiltration rate. Most of the soils in Qatar are orthents, meaning they lack horizon development and are very shallow.

== Limitations ==
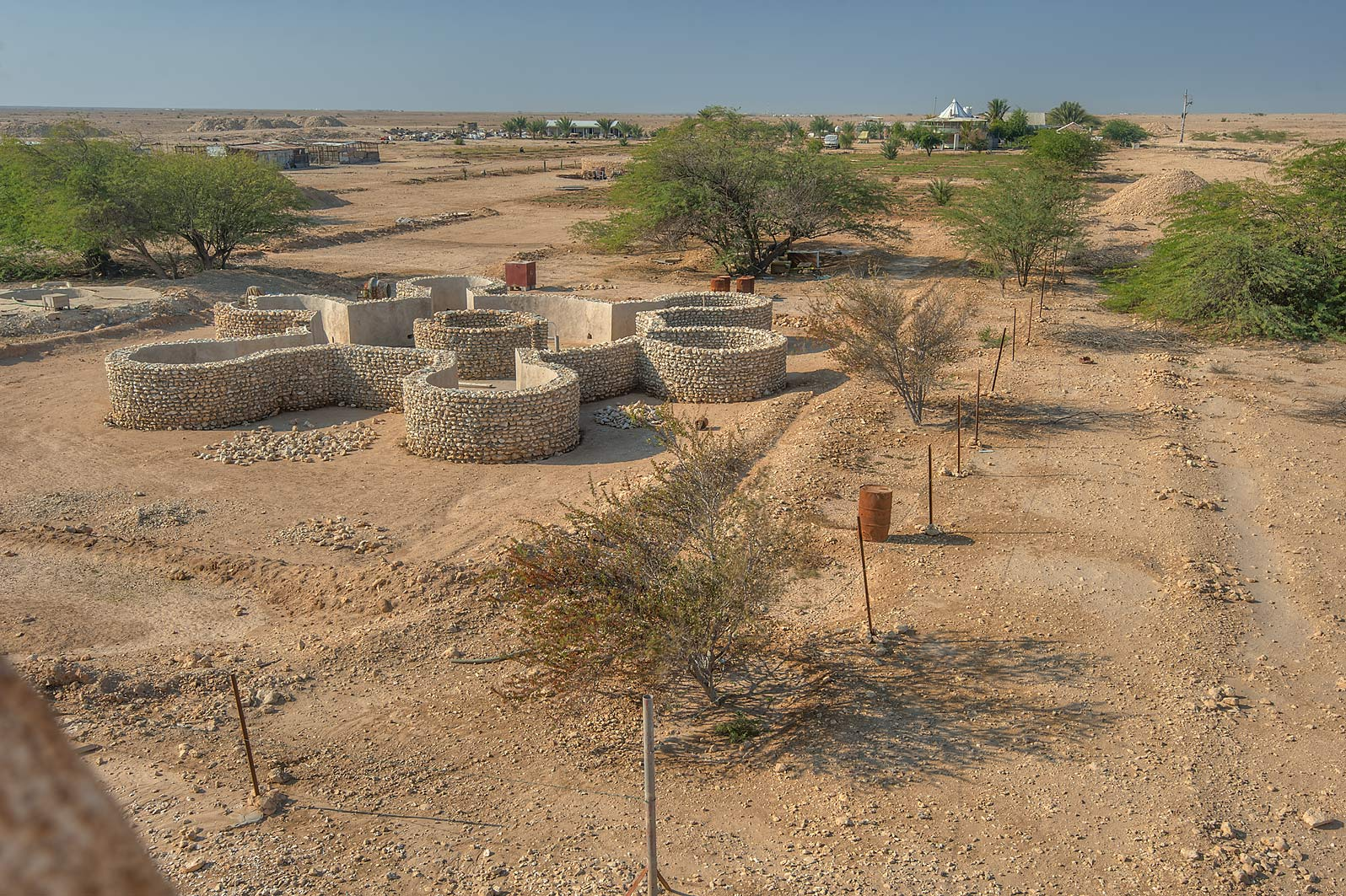
Farmland in Ath Thaqab, northern Qatar

Severe conditions, such as extremely high temperatures and lack of water and fertile soil, hinder increased agricultural production. Orthents, the predominant soil type in the peninsula—accounting for approximately 1,020,000 ha.—are unfavorable for crop cultivation because of their extreme shallowness. The limited groundwater that permits agriculture in some areas is being depleted so rapidly that saltwater is encroaching and making the soil inhospitable to all but the most salt-resistant crops. The northern section of Qatar comprises the most significant source of fresh groundwater in the country, mainly due to more advantageous hydro-geological conditions than those that exist in the southern part of the country. The rate of groundwater extraction in 1966 was 20 million m^{3}/year. This increased to 120 million m^{3}/year by 2000. Studies have approximated that aquifer storage will be completely exhausted by 2025.

== Pearling ==
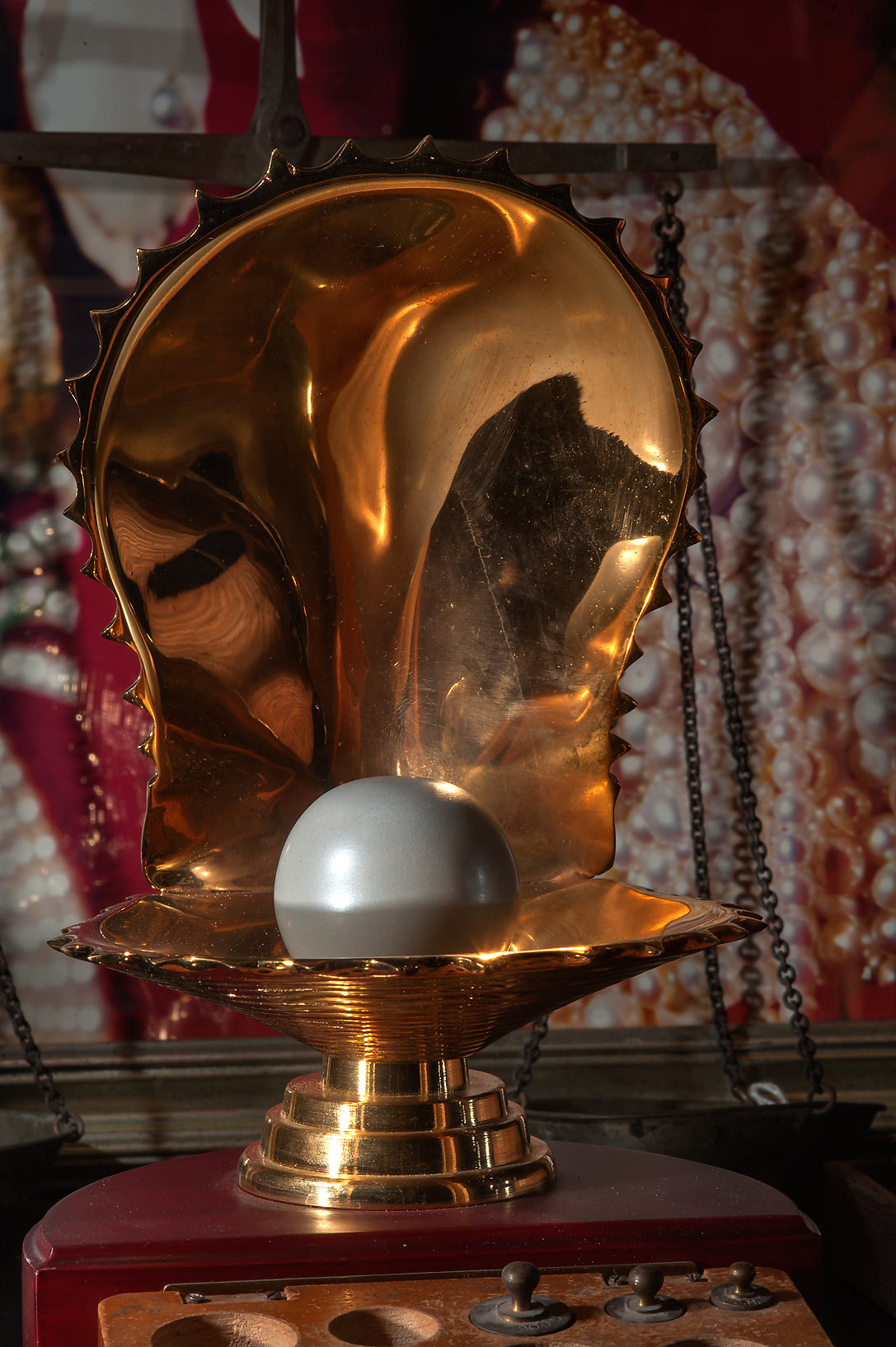
A pearl in a bronze oyster at Sheikh Faisal bin Qassim Al Thani Museum

Pearling was the main source of revenue for Qatar until the discovery of oil in 1939. Approximately 85 pearl beds exist in Qatar's territorial waters. Pearling is an ancient practice in the Persian Gulf, though it is not known exactly when Arabs began diving for pearls. It has been suggested that the profession dates back to the Dilmun civilization in Bahrain approximately 5,000 years ago, which the inhabitants of Qatar came into contact with at the time. The oldest pearl found in the Qatari Peninsula was discovered in a grave at Wadi Debayan in 2022 and has been dated to c. 4600 BCE.

Historically, the season for pearl harvest was divided into three periods. Hansiyah lasted for 40 days and commenced in mid-April. Ghaus Al-Kebir, the primary pearl diving season, took place from May to September 10. Lastly, Ruddah occurred from late September to early October. Sambuk, a type of dhow, was traditionally used for pearling trips. From the 18th to 20th centuries, the majority of pearls were exported to Mumbai where they would be classified and sent to European markets. The remaining yield would be sent to markets in Baghdad. The importance of the pearl in Qatar is exemplified by a quote of Mohammed bin Thani, ruler of Qatar in the late 1800s, who in 1877 was quoted as saying: "We are all, from the highest to the lowest, slaves of one master: Pearl."

The captain of a pearling craft is called noukhadha, and is responsible for the most important tasks of a pearling trip such as managing interpersonal conflicts between the divers (al-fawwas) and the storage of pearls in the pearling vessel, which is known as al-hairat. There were two categories of captains: the sea-captain, noukhadha bahr, who accompanied the divers on the voyage, and the land-captain, noukhadha barr, who stayed ashore. The al-muqaddim is responsible for all ship operations while the al-sakuni is the ship's helmsman. Slave labor was occasionally used by pearling crews. Divers from Persia, Baluchistan and elsewhere in Arabia were also used. While collecting pearls from oysters, divers would plunge to depths of 50 to 80 feet. This work was fraught with dangers and divers often suffered from various medical conditions.

Inventory of pearling ships and their crews in 1908
City	Number of boats	Number of men
Khor Hassan	20	240
Abu Dhalouf	20	200
Ar Ru'ays	18	270
Fuwayrit	35	420
Al Thakhira	15	180
Al Khor	80	1200
Simaisma	50	600
Al Daayen	70	840
Lusail	9	90
Doha	350	6300
Al Wakrah	150	2550

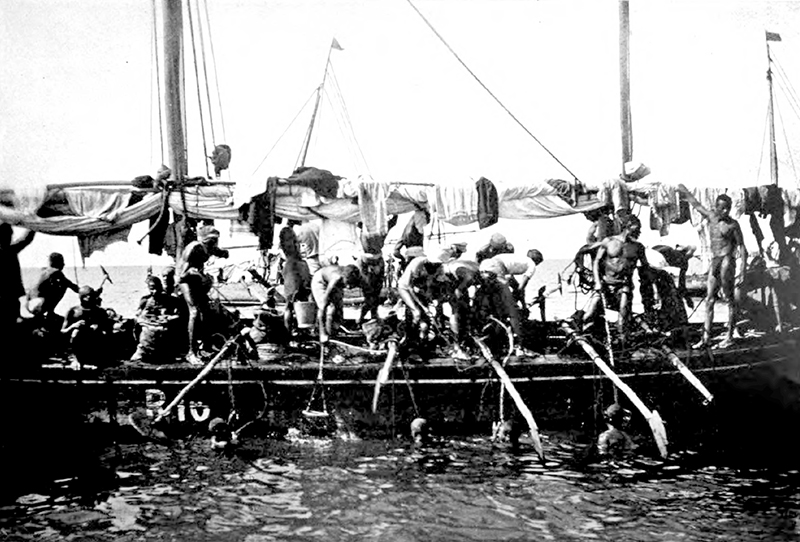
Pearl diving in the Persian Gulf

Zubarah, a settlement on the northwest coast of Qatar, is one of the best preserved and most extensive pearling settlements in the region. Reaching its climax in the 18th century, it was primarily an emporium and pearling settlement that capitalized on its proximity to pearl beds, possession of a large harbor and its central position on the Persian Gulf routes. After the introduction of the cultured pearl and the Great Depression in the 20th century, pearling ceased to be a viable option for many Qataris.

=== Financial system ===
During Qatar's pearl diving season, the financial system operated in two primary ways. The first method, termed Al-Ghees Asselfi or loan diving, was based on credit extended by the ship's captain. Divers would leave money with their families to cover expenses during their absence, which could last up to three months. The second method, called Al-Ghees Tesqam or in kind loan, involved divers leaving their families supplies such as dates, coffee, cardamom, rice, and sugar.

When a man joined a diving crew, he received a glatah, representing his portion of the diving profits, akin to a share of the earnings. These shares were apportioned according to well-established percentages and professional practices. The distribution of shares included the ship (similar to rental fees), the noukhadha (whether sea or land-captain), the al-mejdemi (who communicated the captain's orders to the crew), the al-sakuni (the helmsman), and the divers, with the noukhadha receiving the lion's share of profits.

=== Conditions of pearlers ===
Divers were often slaves or victims of debt bondage. However, pearl traders in Qatar were historically less reliant on forced labor than in neighboring countries. In Paul W. Harrison's 1924 book The Arab at Home, he compares the living conditions between pearl divers in Bahrain and Qatar, stating:

"The fundamental difficulty is in the divers themselves. The majority of the divers of Bahrein are Persians, or belong to that semi-Persian community known as the “Baharina.” They are cheated and defrauded by their employers to a degree almost beyond belief. Their economic condition is pitiable. Not so the comparatively small number of divers who come in from the desert. The Bedouins who come and dive are never exploited. A captain who attempted to cheat them would lose his head and he knows it. Therefore these Bedouins, who avoid debt as they would the plague, receive a much better reward for their work than the others. These wild men bow to no authority except that of Allah in Heaven, and are not easy victims. They usually club together and dive in boats by themselves. They keep out of debt, and so have no limitations to their independence. I asked one of them once in a jocose way whether he was sure that the captain was honest in the reports that were submitted as to the prices secured for pearls and the season’s proceeds. “Ah,” said the diver with the broadest sort of an engaging smile. “What is that you say? Does the captain lie about the price of the pearls he sells for us? No, indeed, he does not lie. He tells the truth. If he should try to cheat us, ha-a.’’ Here the smile extended till it took in his whole face, and he drew the edge of his hand across his own neck in a gesture the meaning of which could not be misunderstood.

The most conspicuous example, however, of divers who are out of debt and therefore out of bondage, is to be found in Katar. Here is a small diving community where practically all of the men are out of debt, and the atmosphere of freedom and equality, good fellowship and comfort is a refreshing contrast to the conditions in Bahrein. The men show real independence and self-respect. These divers can change their employers if the treatment they receive is not satisfactory. They can move to another city to live. In a word, they are free men. Yet the system under which they work is no different from that obtaining in Bahrein. It is the divers who are different. They are Bedouins or descended from Bedouins. They keep out of debt and as a result the system works very well."

== Fishing ==
Fishing, historically, has been overshadowed by pearling due to the higher costs associated with maintaining the crafts and equipment for fishing trips. The Qatar National Fishing Company was incorporated in 1966 to fish for shrimp in territorial waters and to process catches in a refrigerated factory. Japan is a large market for Doha's commercial fish. The total catch of fish and other aquatic animals for 1989 was 4,374 tons.
