= National symbols of Qatar =

The national symbols of Qatar are official and unofficial flags, icons or cultural expressions that are emblematic, representative or otherwise characteristic of Qatar and of its culture.

== Symbol ==
| Title | Name of Symbol | Picture |
|---|---|---|
| National flag | Flag of Qatar | |
| Coat of arms | Coat of arms of Qatar | |
| National anthem | As-Salam al-Amiri | National anthem of Qatar |
| National tree | Sidra tree | |
| National bird | Falcon | |
| National animal | Arabian oryx | |
