= International rankings of Qatar =

The following are international rankings of Qatar.

== Cities ==
Doha

- Urban areas by population ranked lower than 131

== Demographics ==
- United Nations: Population ranked 155 out of 221 countries
- Population density ranked 128 out of 241 countries
- United Nations report World Population Policies 2005, Number of immigrants ranked 53 out of 192 countries

== Economy ==
- United Nations: Human Development Index, ranked 33 out of 182 countries
- Nominal GDP 2007, ranked 59 by IMF; ranked 67 by World Bank; ranked 60 by CIA
- Nominal GDP per capita 2006, ranked 3 by IMF; ranked 4 by CIA
- The Economist Quality-of-Life Index 2005, ranked 41 out of 111 countries
- World Economic Forum: Global Competitiveness Report ranked 22 out of 133 countries
- World Economic Forum: Travel and Tourism Competitiveness Report 2008, ranked 48 out of 130 countries

== Environment ==
- Yale University Center for Environmental Law and Policy and Columbia University Center for International Earth Science Information Network: Environmental Sustainability Index, insufficient data to rank countries
- US Department of Energy: CO_{2} emissions per capita 2004, ranked 1 out of 206 countries
- The World Factbook: water resources ranked 164 out of 174 countries
- Waste generation: Per capita, the waste generation rate in Qatar is one of the highest in the world. Each person in Qatar generates an average of four pounds of trash every day. Qatar's population generates 2.5 million tons of solid waste every year.

== Geography ==
- Total area ranked out of 234 countries

== Military ==
- Center for Strategic and International Studies: active troops ranked out of 166 countries

== Politics ==
- Transparency International: Corruption Perceptions Index ranked 22 out of 180 countries
- Reporters without borders: Worldwide press freedom index, ranked out of 167 countries
- The Economist Democracy Index 2007, ranked 144 out of 167 countries

== Society ==
- Save the Children: State of the World's Mothers report 2006, ranked X out of 110 countries
- World Health Organization: Suicide rate ranked out of 100 countries
- Institute for Economics and Peace: Global Peace Index ranked 16 out of 144 countries

== Technology ==
- Brown University Taubman Center for Public Policy 2006: ranked in online government services
- World Intellectual Property Organization: Global Innovation Index 2026 ranked 47 out of 139 countries.

== Other ==
Organization	Survey	Ranking
Institute for Economics and Peace	Global Peace Index	16 out of 144
United Nations Development Programme	Human Development Index	33 out of 182
Transparency International	Corruption Perceptions Index	22 out of 180
World Economic Forum	Global Competitiveness Report	22 out of 133

== See also ==
- Economy of Qatar
- Education in Qatar
- Military of Qatar
- Politics of Qatar
- Lists of countries
- Lists by country
- List of international rankings
