= Prostitution in Qatar =

Prostitution is illegal in Qatar and carries severe punishment of several years in prison. Prostitution normally takes place in bars, nightclubs and hotels. There are occasional clamp-downs and the prostitutes are arrested and deported.

== History ==
During the era of slavery in Qatar, prostitution was connected to slavery. The Islamic Law formally prohibited prostitution. However, since the principle of concubinage in Islam in Islamic Law allowed a man to have intercourse with his female slave, prostitution was practiced by a pimp selling his female slave on the slave market to a client, who was allowed to have intercourse with her as her new owner, and who after intercourse returned his ownership of her to her pimp on the pretext of discontent, which was a legal and accepted method for prostitution in the Islamic world. Slavery in Qatar was however abolished in 1952.

== Legal situation ==
Like other Persian Gulf countries, prostitution and related activities are illegal. Chapter 6 of the Penal Code deals with Instigation of Debauchery, Dissipation and Fornication:

- Article 294
  - Whoever instigates debauchery, dissipation or adultery in public through words, gestures or any other means shall be liable to a prison term of no less than six months and not exceeding three years.
- Article 295
  - Whoever commits any of the following acts shall be punished with imprisonment for a term of no less than one year and not exceeding three years.
    - 1- Opens or runs a brothel or contributing to its opening or running;
    - 2- Owns a house or a store and leasing it knowing that it is going to be used as a brothel;
- Article 296
  - Whoever commits the following offences shall be punished with imprisonment for a term of no less than one year and no more than three years:
    - 1- Grooms a female to commit adultery;
    - 2- Instigates, induces, seduces a female in any way to commit adultery or to frequent a brothel in order to commit debauchery whether inside or outside the country;
    - 3- Leading, instigating or seducing a male by in any way to commit sodomy or dissipation;
    - 4- Inducing or seducing a male or a female in any way to commit illegal or immoral actions;
    - 5- Bringing, exposing or accepting a male or a female for the purpose of sexual exploitation.
- Article 297
  - Whoever commits any of the offences mentioned in the preceding Article through compulsion, duress or ruse or if the victim is under sixteen of age or the offender is one of the previously mentioned in Article 279 of the present Law, where the offender is assumed to know the real age of the victim, shall be punished with imprisonment for a term up to fifteen years.
- Article 298
  - Whoever performs adultery or sodomy as a profession or for a living shall be punished with imprisonment for a term up to ten years.
  - The same penalty shall be imposed on any person who exploits another person's immorality and prostitution.
- Article 299
  - In addition to the penalties stipulated in the preceding Articles, the court shall order the closure of the place where the offence is committed, and may only reopen for a legal purpose with the approval of the Office of the Attorney General.

== Sex trafficking ==
Qatar is listed by the US Department of State as a Tier 2 country for trafficking. It is a destination for men and women trafficked for the purposes of involuntary servitude and, to a lesser extent, commercial sexual exploitation. The country is a destination for women from China, Indonesia, the Philippines, Morocco, Sri Lanka, Lebanon, India, Africa, Central Asia and Eastern Europe trafficked for the purpose of commercial sexual exploitation.

The State of Qatar, however, made substantial efforts to eliminate trafficking by increasing the overall anti-trafficking law enforcement efforts. The 2011 anti-trafficking law forbade sex and labor trafficking and suggested penalties of up to seven years imprisonment for the criminal. The government regulated a fine of up to 250,000 Qatari riyal ($68,680) and up to 15 years imprisonment, if the crimes involved adult male victims, and up to 300,000 Qatari riyal ($82,420) in case of an adult female or a child victim.
