= Abortion in Qatar =

Abortion in Qatar is illegal in some circumstances. Under Qatar's penal code, a woman who induces her abortion or who consents to an abortion faces up to five years' imprisonment. Individuals who perform an unauthorized abortion on a woman may face up to five years' imprisonment if she consents, and up to ten years if it is performed without her consent.

== Historical context ==
Historically, abortion was allowed in Qatari society only if the pregnancy was deemed to endanger the mother's life. Qatar's penal code ratified this convention in 1971 by legalizing abortion in cases where the mother's life would be saved. Furthermore, a law formalized in 1983 states that abortions may be legally performed on pregnancies of less than four months' duration if the continuation of the pregnancy were to cause serious harm to the mother's health if continued, or if there is evidence that the child would be born with untreatable mental or physical deficiencies and both parents consented to the abortion.

== Process ==
Before they can be performed, abortions must first be recommended by a medical commission comprising three specialists. By law, abortions must be performed in a government hospital.

Most abortions carried out by residents of Qatar are performed in the country itself rather than abroad. With about 100 expat women being arrested and jailed in Qatar every year for giving birth to a child out of wedlock, unmarried women sometimes feel forced perform abortions, despite their illegality and at times unsafe conditions.

== Women's social role ==
Having children is highly encouraged for women in Qatar, but having them outside of wedlock can result in being imprisoned due to the Zina law, which criminalizes sex outside of a legal marriage, resulting in up to 7 years of imprisonment. It is also known that in Qatari societal standards, women must obtain permission from their husbands or fathers to travel outside of the country.

Women who live in Qatar and experience sexual violence, rape, or any form of sexual assault are at times unable to receive necessary reproductive healthcare, because authorities often require a marriage certification for these procedures.
