= Doha Cultural Festival =

Cultural festival in Doha, Qatar

The Doha Cultural Festival is one of the cultural activities carried out annually by the Qatari Ministry of Culture, Arts and Heritage, which began in 2002 with the aim of spreading Qatari culture inside and outside Qatar. This festival includes various cultural activities, including poetry evenings by Arab and Gulf poets and lasts for 16 days.

== Activities ==
The Doha Cultural Festival includes various activities, including poetry evenings, operas, and various plays as well as Arabic songs. It also hosts a number of folklore and performance troupes, where each troupe embodies its country's folklore heritage as well as representing its country with the clothes it wears from the past. In 2011, there were international artistic performances, a presentation by “Sako” symphony, which is an orchestra consisting of about 60 European players on various musical instruments, led by musician Salem Abdel Karim, who plays solo on the oud, knowing that the evening is a tribute to the Arab lute and is suitable for anyone. The objectives of the festival are to support cultural exchange between peoples.
