= List of banks in Qatar =

This is a list of banks in Qatar.

== Central bank ==
- Qatar Central Bank (QCB)

== Local banks ==
Name	Abbv.	Established	Website
Qatar National Bank	QNB	6 June 1964	qnb.com/qnbqatar
Doha Bank		15 March 1979	qa.dohabank.com
Commercial Bank of Qatar	CBQ	10 April 1975	cbq.qa
Qatar International Islamic Bank	QIIB	1991	qiib.com.qa
Qatar Islamic Bank	QIB	1982	qib.com.qa
Qatar Development Bank	QDB	1997	qdb.qa
Ahlibank		1983	ahlibank.com.qa
Masraf Al Rayan	MAR	January 2006	alrayan.com
Dukhan Bank^{1}		8 October 2020	dukhanbank.com

1. New entity after International Bank of Qatar and Barwa Bank merged.

== Foreign banks ==
Name	Abbv.	Established in Qatar	Majority Owner	Capital	Website
Arab Bank Qatar		1957	Arab Bank	(Jordan)	arabbank.com.qa
Mashreq Bank Qatar		1971	Mashreq	(United Arab Emirates)	mashreqbank.com/qatar
HSBC Bank Middle East	HSBC	1954	HSBC	(United Kingdom)	hsbc.com.qa
BNP Paribas Middle East Africa		1973	BNP Paribas	(France)	mea.bnpparibas.com
Bank Saderat Iran - Qatar	BSI	1970	Bank Saderat Iran	(Iran)	bsi.com.qa
United Bank Limited - Qatar	UBL		United Bank Limited	(Pakistan)	ubldirect.com
Standard Chartered Qatar	SC	1950	Standard Chartered	(United Kingdom)	sc.com/qa

== See also ==
- List of banks in the Arab world
