= Wadi Debayan =

Archaeological site in Qatar

- وادي الضبيعان (Arabic)
- Interactive map of Wadi Debayan
- Type: Settlement
- Periods: Neolithic period
- Cultures: Ubaid
- Location: Northwest Qatar

History
- Built: c. 5500 BC
- Abandoned: c. 2500 BC

Site notes
- Excavation dates: 2009 to 2014
- Management: University of Birmingham

Wadi Debayan (Arabic: وادي الضبيعان, romanized: Wādī aḑ Ḑubay‘ān) is the oldest Neolithic archaeological site in Qatar. It was occupied over a stretch of 3000 years before being abandoned in the Bronze Age. Remnants of marine life, plant material and structural components were among the artifacts excavated. Fragments of pottery originating from the early Ubaid period (the period of Mesopotamia which transpired from ca. 6500 to 3800 BC) were also recovered.

== Etymology ==
The term wadi denotes a valley or dry riverbed commonly found in arid and semi-arid regions, typically characterized by steep, rocky sides and a channel that occasionally carries water following seasonal rainfall. The second element, Debayan, derives from the Arabic word for “two hyenas” (dibʾān), referencing a local tradition that two hyenas once inhabited the adjacent plain. The wadi acquired its name due to its course terminating in this plain, which bears the same name.

== History ==
Settlement commenced around 5500 BC. Although the site is approximately 4 km inland, ancient marine sediments demonstrate that it was situated along the coast during its periods of habitation. Furthermore, soil testing attests to the previously rich soil, high propensity of vegetation and frequent rainfall. Due to the large amount of fish bones discovered in the area, it has been proposed that its inhabitants exported dried fish. Human habitation appears to have abruptly stopped around the third century BC, possibly as a result of a large tsunami.

== Discovery and surveys ==
The site was discovered in 2009 and underwent a magnetic survey in 2010. The survey revealed the site's geologic features and accentuated possible areas of burning. One such area, identified as a hearth, yielded potsherds, lithic debitage and animal remnants. Beads from the hearth were carbon dated to the mid-to-late 14th century. Shortly after, the site was subdivided into sectors to prepare it for excavations.

== Excavations ==
Wadi Debayan was excavated by a team from the University of Birmingham as part of the Qatar Remote Sensing and National Historic Environment Record Project between 2009 and 2014 under the direction of Dr. Richard Cuttler. Over 1500 artifacts were discovered, including 5 obsidian artifacts and 180 Ubaid potsherds. There were approximately nine different types of flint material recovered, all of which were highly weathered. Some of the raw material originated from Al Khor, a city located 40 km from the site. Flakes and scrapers formed the bulk of artifacts. Tools consistent with the Arabian bifacial tradition were discovered in the forms of knives and arrowheads and are dated from 6000 to 3500 BC.

The site yielded the highest proportion of Ubaid pottery and obsidian yet discovered in Qatar. This suggests trade links existed between the inhabitants of Wadi Debayan and Mesopotamia. The assemblages of tools at the site indicate a pattern of recurrent occupation rather than a continuous period of occupation.

Test pitting and geophysical survey towards the base of the wadi revealed a plethora of anthropogenic features associated with a Chénier beach ridge or paleoshoreline, which extended for more than 500 metres around the northern edge of the wadi. The beach ridge was sealed by, and cut by hearths indicative of multiple phases of occupation and Chénier beach ridge accumulation from the middle of the 5th millennium BC. The uppermost layers of the beach ridge are indicative of a high energy event or possible tsunami that coincide with a hiatus in prehistoric occupation around the middle of the 3rd millennium BC.

A burial site dating to c. 3000 BC was discovered to contain four human skeletons.
