= Sport in Qatar =

Sport in Qatar is primarily centred on football in terms of participation and spectators. Additionally, athletics, basketball, handball, volleyball, camel racing, horse racing, cricket and swimming are also widely practised. There are currently eleven multi-sports clubs in the country and seven single-sports clubs.

The largest sporting event hosted in Qatar was the 2006 Asian Games, held in Doha. There were 46 disciplines from 39 events contested. On 2 December 2022, Qatar hosted the 2022 FIFA World Cup, thus becoming the first Arab nation to host the tournament. Qatar will host the 2027 FIBA Basketball World Cup, thus becoming the first Arab nation to host a major basketball tournament.

Two weeks after stripping San Diego as the host of the first World Beach Games, the Association of National Olympic Committees on 14 June 2019 gave Qatar the honour to host the event. ANOC said, "Qatar boasts spectacular oceanfront locations and is ready to provide the perfect setting." The 2019 World Beach Games were held from October 12 to 16.

== Team sports ==
=== Football ===
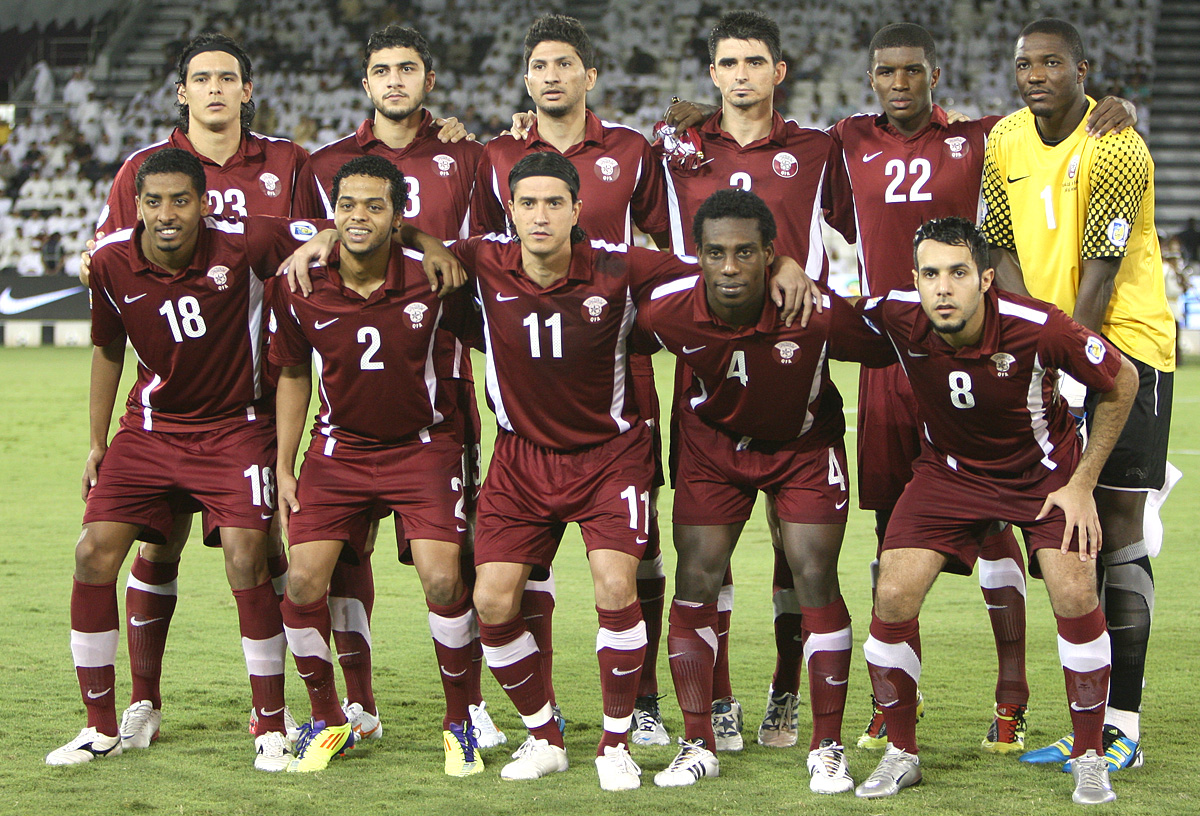
Qatar national football team in 2011.

Football is by far the most popular sport in Qatar and is played and supported by locals and expatriates alike. The country has two tiers of domestic professional football leagues. The top tier, known as the Qatar Stars League, has undergone numerous expansions in the last several years. In 2009, the league expanded from ten to twelve clubs, and again expanded by two clubs in May 2013, bringing the total number of teams in the first division to fourteen. Attendance at QSL matches ranges between 2,000 and 10,000, depending on the popularity of the teams. In a 2014 survey conducted by Qatari government ministries and departments, 65% of the 1,079 respondents indicated that they did not attend a football match in the previous league season.

Al Sadd is the most successful sports club in the country, and has won the continental club competition on two occasions. Former Real Madrid and Spain striker Raúl played for Al Sadd between 2012 and 2014, and in July 2015 the club announced the signing of former FC Barcelona and Spain playmaker Xavi. In May 2019, Xavi was appointed the head coach of the club following his retirement at the end of the 2018–19 season. Other famous footballers to play in Qatar include Pep Guardiola, Gabriel Batistuta, Fernando Hierro, Ronald de Boer, Santi Cazorla and Marco Verratti.

The Qatari national football team have won the Arabian Gulf Cup three times and twice as hosts, first in 1992 and again in 2004 and 2015. The youth team also reached the final of the 1981 FIFA World Youth Championship, where they lost 4–0 to West Germany in the final.

Qatar hosted the AFC Asian Cup in 1988, 2011 and 2023. They won the competition for the first time in the 2019 edition, after defeating Japan 3–1 in the final held in Abu Dhabi. Qatar would successfully retain their title on home soil, following a 3–1 victory against Jordan in the 2023 final held in Lusail.

In June 2019, FIFA awarded Qatar the rights to host the 2019 and 2020 FIFA Club World Cup. On 21 December 2019, Qatar concluded the Club World Cup, which was being looked at as a benchmark for the 2022 FIFA World Cup. However, the tournament was announced as one of the most successful editions in history by Secretary-General of the Supreme Committee for Delivery & Legacy (SC), Hassan al-Thawadi.

==== 2022 FIFA World Cup ====
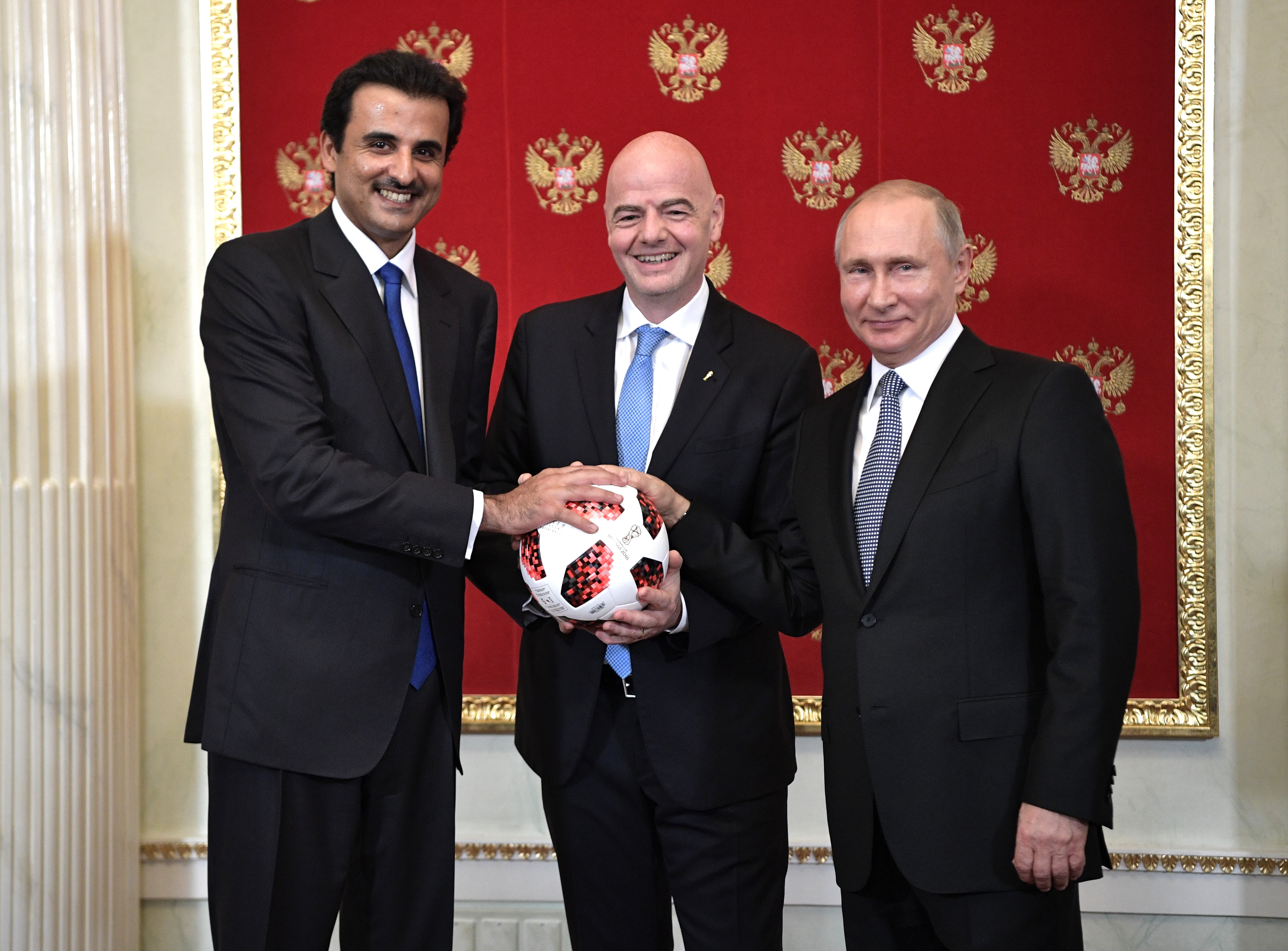
Russia handing over the symbolic relay baton for the hosting rights of the 2022 FIFA World Cup to Qatar in June 2018

On 2 December 2010, Qatar won their bid to host the 2022 FIFA World Cup. Beating rival bids from Australia, the United States, South Korea, and Japan, FIFA stated that the Qatari bid ran on a platform of bringing the World Cup to the only part of the world previously excluded from hosting it, donating parts of stadia to under-developed countries in Africa and Asia after the competition finishes, and allowing fans to watch multiple matches in one day and reduce travel expenses by being the most compact tournament to date.

The local organising committee, the Supreme Committee for Development and Legacy, is planning to build nine new stadiums and expand three existing stadiums for this event. The first stadium to be completed will be the Khalifa International Stadium, due in 2016. Qatar's winning bid for the 2022 World Cup was greeted enthusiastically in the Arab world as it was the first time a country in the Middle East or North Africa had been selected to host the tournament.

The tournament is expected to generate thousands of jobs, with extensive infrastructure required to prepare the country to host the world's biggest sports games. Official Qatari sources have estimated that the country will spend US$138 billion, which will include new motorways, a new deep-water port, a metro system as well as nine stadia and an extensive fan zone.

As of summer 2015, major contracts have been awarded to several international companies, including Foster and Partners, WS Atkins, Arup Associates, and Pascall+Watson.

In addition to the awarding of contracts to international companies, the Supreme Committee announced its intention to support entrepreneurs and small and medium-sized enterprises in the region through the Challenge 22 competition. Held for the first time in June 2015, the competition requires anyone inhabiting a GCC country to submit a business plan. Finalists are invited to Doha for two days of intense coaching, before pitching to judges and winning cash and incubation prizes.

To deliver these projects on time the economy and population are expected to double between 2014 and 2022, with the total number of inhabitants due to exceed four million. The need for new housing has given a boost to the construction and real estate sectors, with growth expected to be 9.5 percent according to the Qatar Statistics Authority.

The emblem for the 2022 FIFA World Cup was revealed in Doha on September 3, 2019. Since the 2022 FIFA would be the first to be played in winter, the emblem depicts a woolen shawl and is inspired by the Arab culture.

Ahead of the World Cup, the United States Men's National Soccer Team (USMNT) announced to hold a training camp in Doha in January 2020. Players like Gyasi Zardes, Jordan Morris, Sebastian Lletget and Aaron Long have been invited to join the camp at Qatar's Aspire Academy.

In October 2021, David Beckham signed a $277 million (£150m) deal with Qatar. Beckham signed a ten-year deal with Qatar to be the face of the Qatar World Cup in 2022.

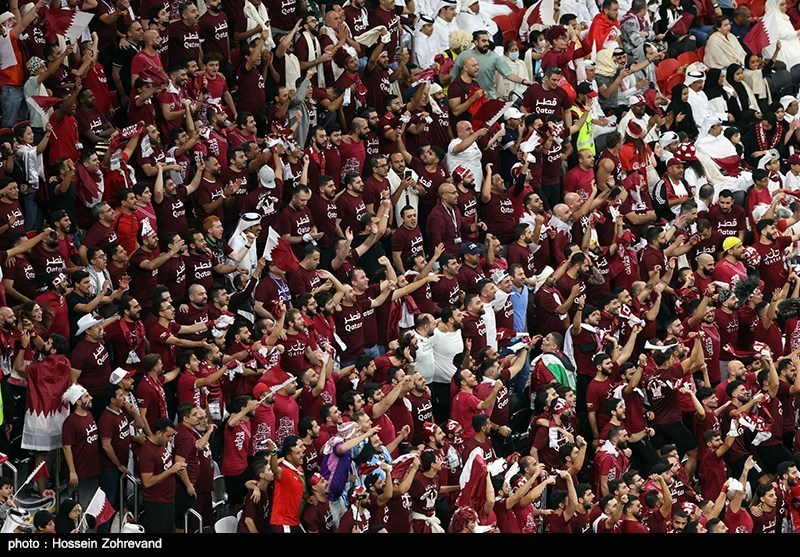
Supporters of the Qatar national team during the opening match of the 2022 FIFA World Cup

Argentina were crowned the champions after winning the final against the title holder France 4–2 on penalties following a 3–3 draw after extra time. It was Argentina's third title and their first since 1986, as well as being the first nation from outside of Europe to win the tournament since 2002.

==== Controversies ====
Shortly after the awarding of the 2022 FIFA World Cup to Qatar, the bid was embroiled in controversy, including allegations of bribery. European football associations have also objected to the 2022 World Cup being held in Qatar for a variety of reasons, including the impact of high temperatures on players' fitness, to the disruption it might cause in European domestic league calendars should the event be rescheduled to take place during winter. In March 2015, FIFA and Qatar agreed that the competition would be held in November and December 2022.

Qatar authorities have also sought to improve the situation by commissioning British law firm DLA Piper to undertake a review of conditions in 2012. Following the recommendations made, Qatar Foundation created the Migrant Workers Welfare Charter which applies minimum requirements to the recruitment, living and working conditions, as well as the general treatment of workers engaged in construction and other projects. The mandatory standards will be incorporated into agreements between Qatar Foundation and all its contractors, who are required to comply with the requirements and rules. Contractors and sub-contractors found to be violating the regulations have been blacklisted from future tenders.

Labour rights have slowly been improving since the review; for example, in August 2015, Qatar announced it would launch a new electronic salary system to guarantee safe and punctual payments directly into workers' bank accounts. Companies that fail to pay their workers on time will be fined and the country maintains that prison sentences could even be handed out. Government ministers also predict that changes to the country's kafala system will be announced later in 2015.

On 31 March 2016, Amnesty International report condemned Qatar for its forced labour and abuses against migrant workers. This report is based on 132 migrant construction workers. According to the report, there were many issues like congested and small accommodations, not being paid for several months, kafala sponsorship system, and many others. In October 2019, Qatari authorities have taken a significant step towards protecting migrant workers. According to the reports the reforms include minimum thresholds for wage, food, and accommodation, totaling QR 1,800. In addition, a Minimum Wage Commission was established to monitor its impact. Between September 2020 and March 2022, over 300,000 workers (including 7,000 domestic workers) changed their jobs. The Worker’s Support and Insurance Fund, established in 2019, has disbursed QAR 358,000,000 (nearly USD 100m) to over 35,000 workers, in March 2022. A non-discriminatory minimum wage came into force in March 2021, and 280,000 workers, or 13% of the workforce received a wage rise. The number of complaints on the online platform was nearly 25,000 in 2021, compared to 11,000 in the previous year. In March 2022, 228 workers’ representatives were elected to represent almost 40,000 employees in 37 enterprises.

=== Basketball ===
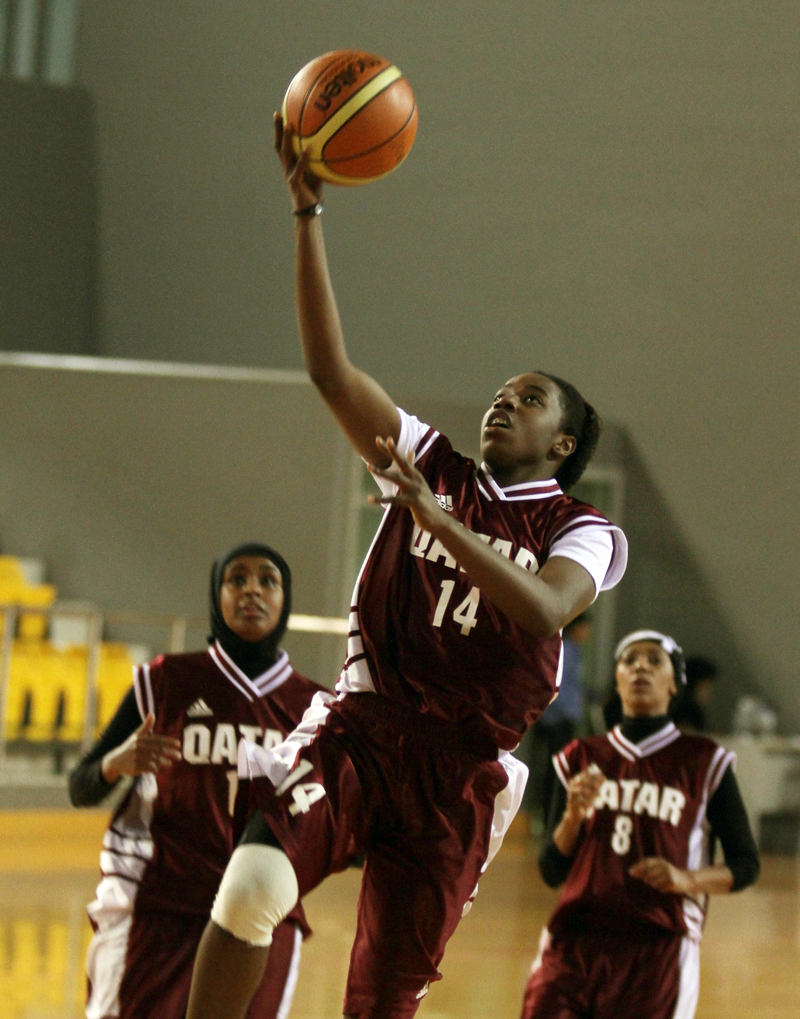
Qatari female basketball players

Basketball is an increasingly popular sport in Qatar. The sport is administered by the Qatar Basketball Federation (QBF). The QBF was established in 1964, but was only admitted into the FIBA Asia and the Organizing Committee of the GCC in 1979.

Qatar's first basketball championship came in the 1995 GCC Youth Championship. The national basketball team won back-to-back bronze medals in the 2003 and 2005 editions of the Asian Basketball Championship and qualified for the FIBA Basketball World Cup for the first time in 2006 held in Japan. Qatar will host the 2027 FIBA Basketball World Cup making Qatar the first FIBA Basketball World Cup in the Middle East or North Africa region.

Club teams compete in the Qatari Basketball League, the top domestic basketball league in the country. Qatar's first women's basketball league was launched in 2012.

On 28 April 2023, during a central board meeting in Manila, FIBA announced that Qatar will host the upcoming 2027 FIBA Basketball World Cup. The 2027 FIBA Basketball World Cup will be the 20th tournament of the FIBA Basketball World Cup for men's national basketball teams. The tournament will be the third to feature 32 teams.

It will be the first FIBA Basketball World Cup to be held in the Arab world, and the third straight to be held in Asia after the 2019 tournament in China and the 2023 edition co-hosted by the Philippines, Japan, and Indonesia. Qatar will also be the second Muslim country to host after the 2010 edition in Turkey.

=== Beach volleyball ===
Qatar featured a men's national team in beach volleyball that competed at the 2018–2020 AVC Beach Volleyball Continental Cup.

=== Cricket ===
Cricket is the second most popular sport in Qatar, albeit one that the local citizens play very little. Despite that, massive numbers of migrant workers and residents from South Asia and the Indian subcontinent play the game that is a national pastime in their countries of origin. Since the subcontinent accounts for nearly half the residents in Qatar, the game is rapidly picking up its pace. Although the local Qatar national team isn't as popular, cricket tournaments such as the ICC World Cup and the ICC World Twenty20 which exclude Qatar but include nations that account for most of the expatriates in the country are one of the most viewed sporting events in the country.

The Qatar Cricket Association (QCA) is set to host the country's first T10 League by the end of 2019.

=== Futsal ===
Futsal became an officially sanctioned sport in 2007, when the fully professional Qatar Futsal League was established. There are two futsal tournaments; the QFA Futsal Cup and the Open Cup, which was inaugurated in 2010. Futsal is overseen by a department of the Qatar Football Association. A women's league was launched in 2009 under the auspices of the Women's Sports Committee.

=== Handball ===
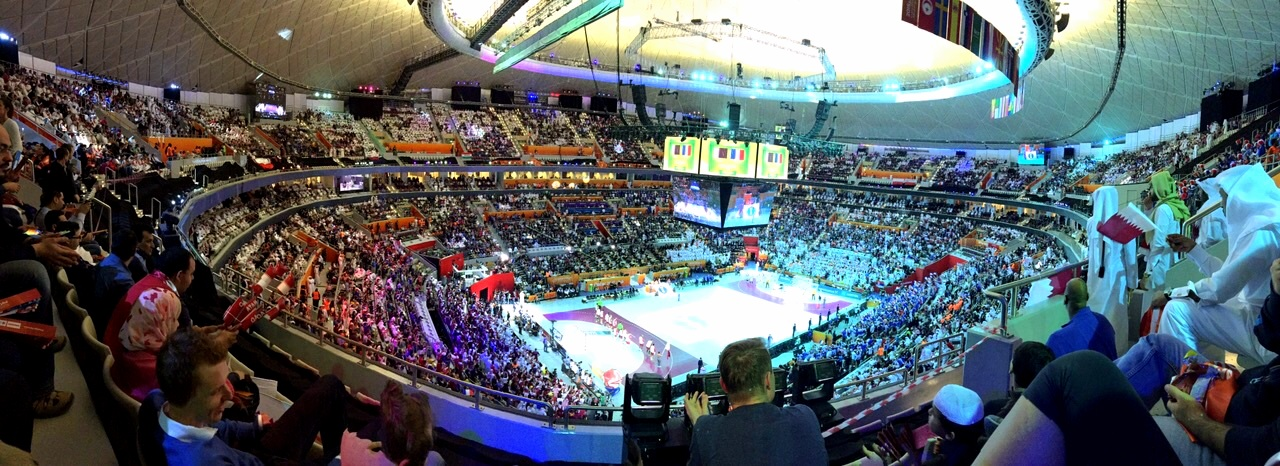
2015 World Men's Handball Championship final, Qatar vs France

Handball is a very popular team sport in Qatar. It was introduced to the country in 1968; however, Qatar did not join the International Handball Federation until the 1970s. The Qatar men's national handball team qualified for the IHF World Men's Handball Championship on four occasions, and automatically qualified for a fifth as host. Qatar came runners-up to France in the 2015 World Handball Championship held on home soil, however the tournament was marred by various controversies.

Qatar has won the Asian Men's Handball Championship title four times in a row in 2014, 2016, 2018 and 2020.

== Individual sports ==
=== Horse racing ===
Horse racing has been increasing in popularity in Qatar since the late 20th century. In 1995, the first edition of the Desert Marathon was held, attracting riders from across the world. Two of the most important horse breeding and indoor racing facilities are Al Shaqab and Al Samriya Equestrian Centre.

=== Golf ===
Qatar has hosted the Commercial Bank Qatar Masters, a European Tour golf event, since 1998.

=== Table Tennis ===
In October 2021, Sultan Khalid Al Kuwari won U-13 World table tennis tournament with 3-2 victory over compatriot Rawad Al Nasser at Sultan Qaboos Sports Complex in Muscat, Oman.

== Motor sports ==
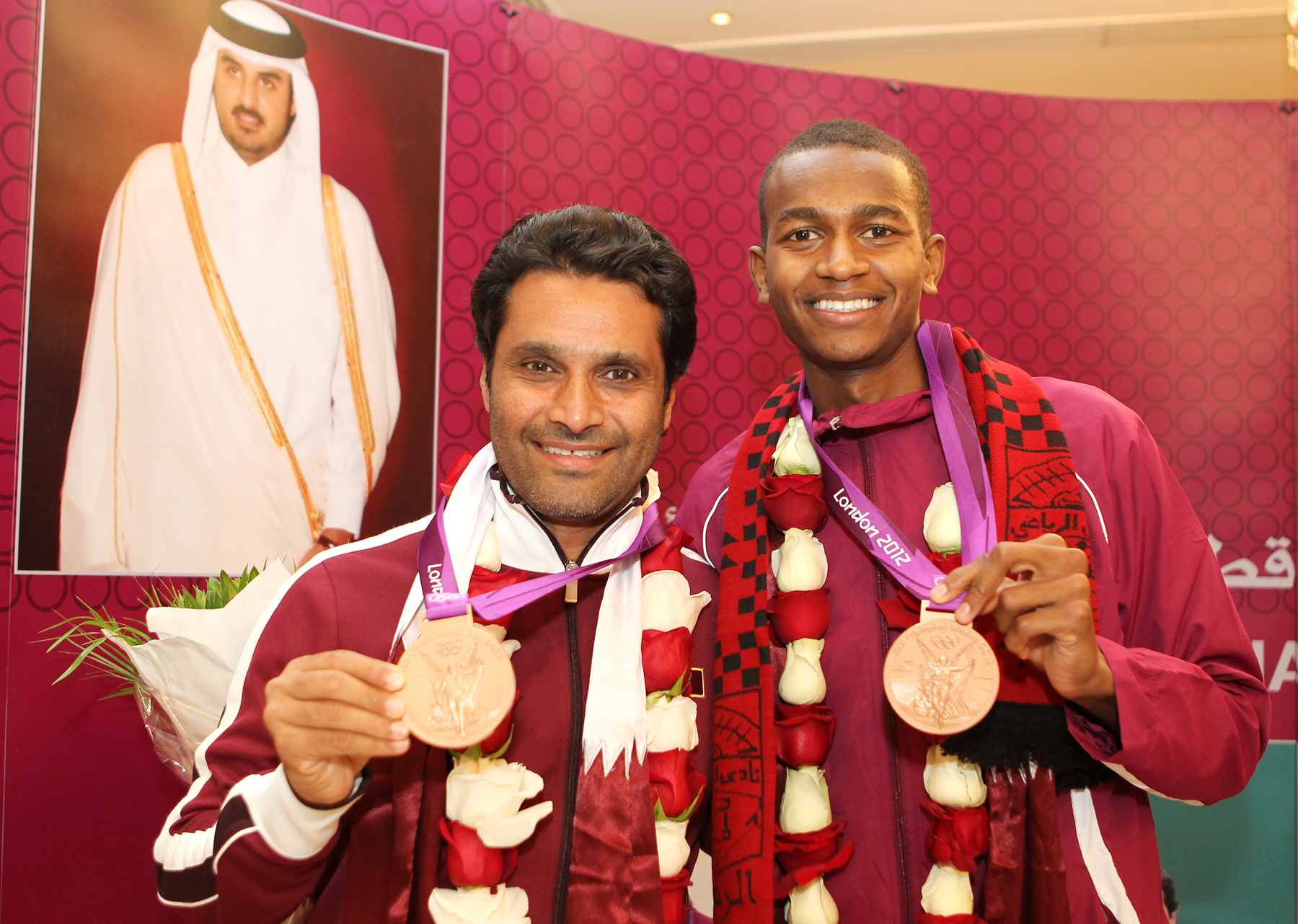
Qatar's two bronze medalists at the 2012 Summer Olympics, Nasser Al-Attiyah and Mutaz Essa Barshim posing for a picture.

=== Motor racing ===
Qatar Racing Club, a drag racing facility where the Arabian Drag Racing League competes, is located in the country's capital Doha on a 150,000 m^{2} area. Its racing track has a capacity for 2,000 people.

Khalid bin Hamad Al Thani, the first Qatari to drive a Formula One car, is involved in the sport and is the owner of Al-Annabi Racing.

Qatari athlete Nasser Al-Attiyah has won 2011, 2015 and 2019 Dakar Rally, the 2008, 2015, 2016 and 2017 FIA Cross Country Rally World Cup, the 2006 Production World Rally Championship, and the 2014 and 2015 World Rally Championship-2.

The Losail International Circuit has hosted the Qatar motorcycle Grand Prix since 2004, a Superbike World Championship round from 2005 to 2009 and since 2014, a Motocross World Championship round since 2013 and hosted its first ever Formula One grand prix on November 21, 2021, with Lewis Hamilton taking the inaugural victory.

=== Powerboat racing ===
The Grand Prix of Qatar, a round in the Formula 1 Powerboat World Championship, was held annually in Doha Bay from 2005 to 2015. In addition, the state-sponsored Qatar Team won four Formula 1 championships with Jay Price (2008) and Alex Carella (2011–2013). Qatar ended their involvement in Formula 1 powerboat racing in early 2015 with the merger of the Qatar Sailing Federation and Qatar Marine Sports Federation (QMSF).

Since November 2009, Qatar has been the host of the Oryx Cup World Championship, a hydroplane boat race in the H1 Unlimited season. The races take place in Doha Bay.

== Traditional sports ==
=== Camel racing ===
Camel racing is a historically important sport in the country, and is considered a tradition among Qatar's Bedouin tribes, occurring during special occasions such as weddings. The Qatari government has invested heavily in the sport through initiatives implemented by the Camel Racing Organizing Committee (Hejan), such as inaugurating the Al-Shahaniya Arena in 1990, which has modern facilities such as illuminated tracks for nighttime races. The committee has also implemented modern registration systems, such as electronic services for camel owners.

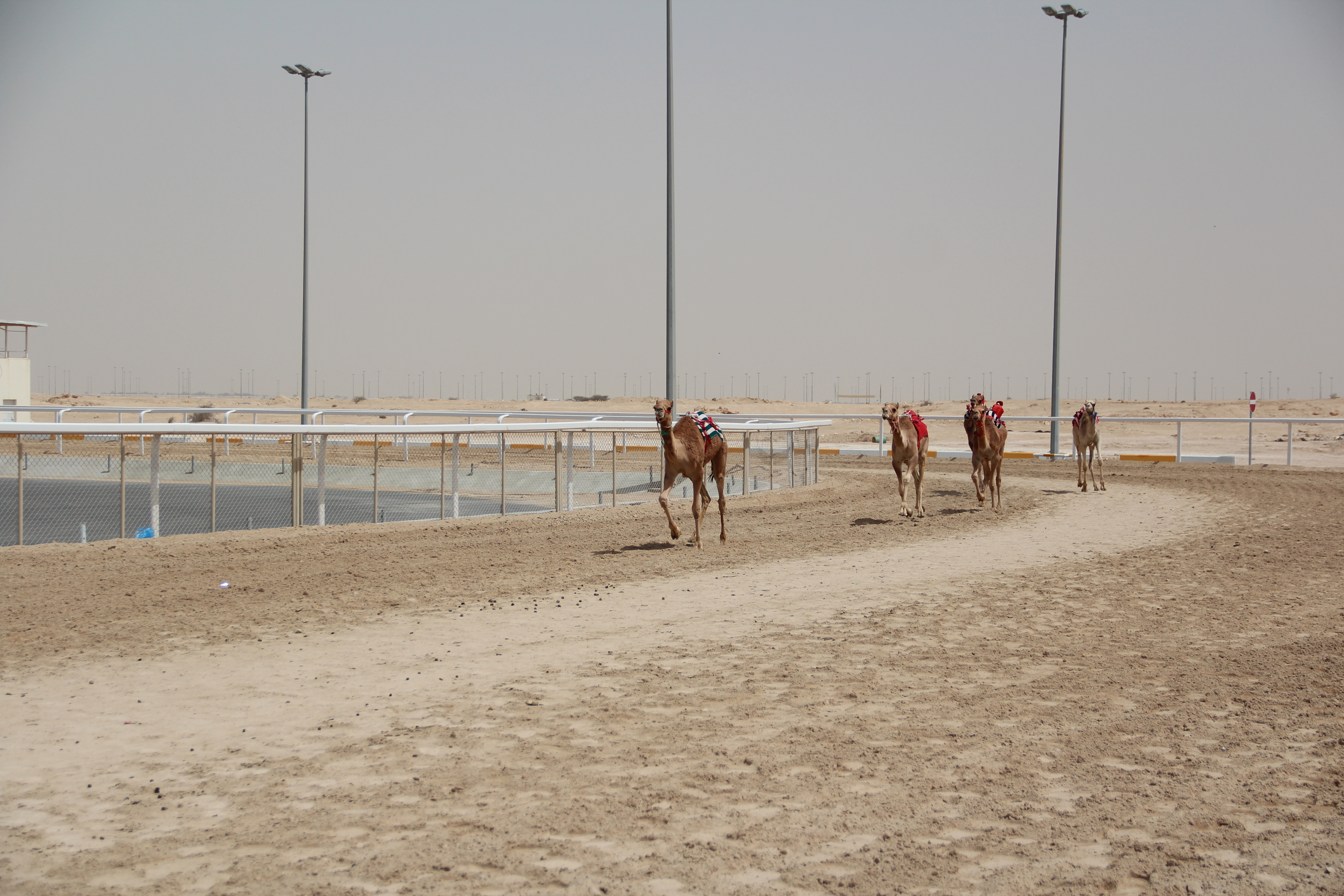
Camels racing down the Al Shahaniya Camel Racetrack

As a competitive sport, camel racing dates back to 1973 when the first camel race was organized in Al-Farra, an area located 9 km west of Al-Shahaniya, featuring 300 camels. Subsequently, new racetracks were inaugurated, such as Al Rayyan Square and Libraqa Square, which hosted races until the late 1980s; these tracks were eventually replaced by the Al-Shahaniya Camel Racetrack in 1990. The two main camel types used for racing in Qatar are Omani camels, known for their robust build and endurance, and the Sudanese camels, known for their speed. Typically, camel racing season takes place from September to March. Approximately 22,000 racing camels are used in competitions which are mainly held at the Al-Shahaniya Camel Racetrack and attended by thousands of spectators. The average distance of such races is usually 4 to 8 km, depending on several factors. The races typically feature large monetary awards for winners, including cars appraised at values upwards of $200,000.

Over the years, the Qatari government organized additional camel racing competitions such as the Grand Annual Festival to showcase camels from Qatar and neighboring Gulf Cooperation Council (GCC) countries. The government has also sponsored efforts to technologically advance the sport as a whole, such as introducing robot jockeys in 2005.

=== Falconry ===
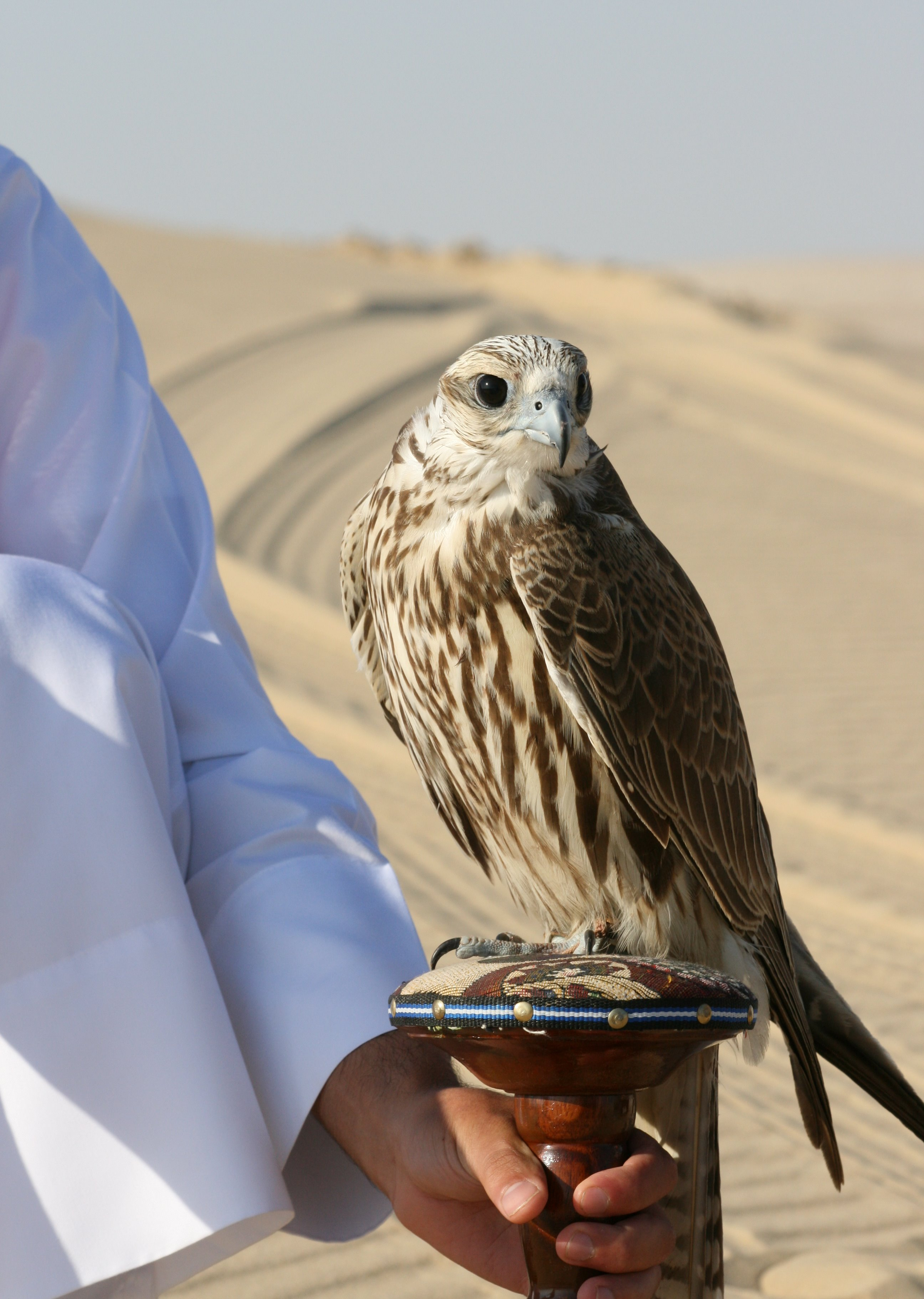
A captive Saker falcon used in falconry in the deserts of Qatar

Falconry has been a popular cultural practice in Qatar for centuries. On average, a falcon can go for anywhere from $4,000 to $10,000; a price of $250,000 was even recorded at an auction in 2022. Due to the high prices of hunting falcons, it is mainly practiced by upper-class citizens able to afford the investment. The only falconry association is Al Gannas, which was founded in 2008 in the Katara Cultural Village and which hosts the Annual Falconry Festival, also known as S'hail. Hunting season extends from October to April.

Falconers are often required to be well-versed in matters such avian anatomy and behavior, as the selection of an efficient hunting falcon is dependent on several physical factors which are not immediately apparent to the layperson, such as feathers and coloration. Furthermore, falconers typically require adequate transportation means to traverse the desert, as they typically travel great distances in search of game, with the plains of Saudi Arabia, Sudan and Pakistan being popular destinations. The most popular local venue for falconry is the Falcon Souq at Souq Waqif in Doha. Among the activities that take place here are auctions for expensive birds, the process of taming, and veterinary care for falcons, which is usually provided at the Souq Waqif Falcon Hospital.

==== Types of falcons ====
The primary variants of falcons are trained for hunting are:

- Saker falcon (Falco cherrug): favored by Bedouins for its endurance, the saker is recognized for its eyesight and intelligence, particularly for handling larger prey like hares.
- Peregrine falcon or Shahin Bahri (Falco peregrinus): Valued for its speed and flight skills, the peregrine is the most expensive due to its rarity and delicate nature.
- Lanner falcon or Shahin Wakri (Falco biarmicus): Though not as fast or powerful as the peregrine and saker, the lanner is hardy, which allows it survive harsh desert conditions.
- Gyrfalcon or Sungur (Falco rusticolus): An imported bird that is often kept as a show bird due to its aesthetics.

==== Acquisition and training ====
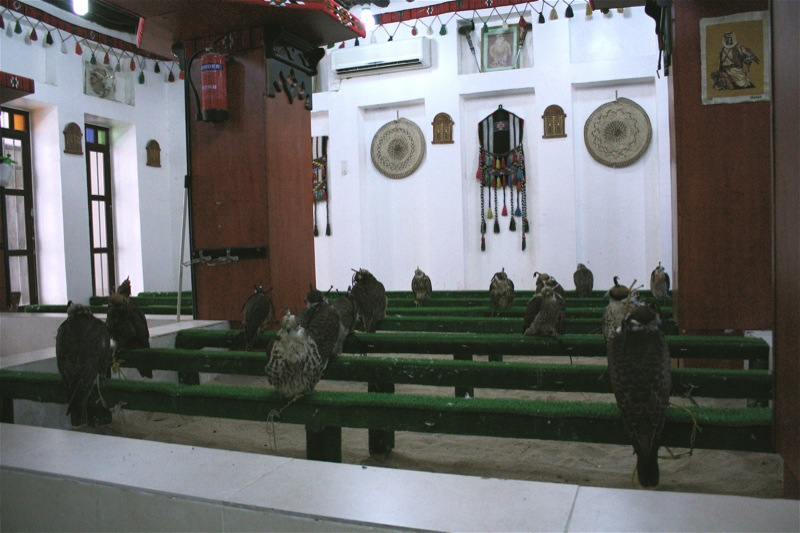
Hooded falcons at Souq Waqif

Falcons are primarily acquired through trapping, with few taken from nests. The area surrounding Al Khor Bay is a popular falcon trapping area. Common methods include using pigeons with nooses or spring-loaded fishing nets around a baited pigeon. Trappers often seek out favorable physical attributes such as pale-colored feathers and a robust size. After being trapped, the falcon's eyes are hooded to prevent visual overstimulation.

=== Fishing and pearl diving ===
Although historically less economically important than pearl hunting, fishing was considered among the cornerstones of Qatar's economy in the past. The two primary methods of fishing were known as hadaq and laffah. Hadaq consisted of fishing during a stationary position, and laffah was performed while moving. In 2012, the first edition of the Senyar Festival was organized by Katara Cultural Village with the aim of preserving Qatar's maritime heritage. During the Senyar Festival, the two fishing competitions held are the Hadaq championship, which is followed by the Laffah championship, and finally the Qaffal, which is the grand ceremony. The team sizes consist of 10 to 13 people. Contestants are only allowed to use traditional fishing methods, with the winning team being selected based on the total weight of their catch. The 2018 edition of the festival saw the eligibility restrictions loosened to allow four GCC nationals or expatriates living in Qatar on each team. Katara also hosted the inaugural edition of the Bilmesan Championship in May 2024, held near Halul Island. It featured the 16 top teams of the 2024 Senyar Festival.

There is also a pearl diving competition held during the Senyar Festival. The 2018 edition featured 15 dhows and 168 pearl divers.

== Sports by number of athletes registered ==
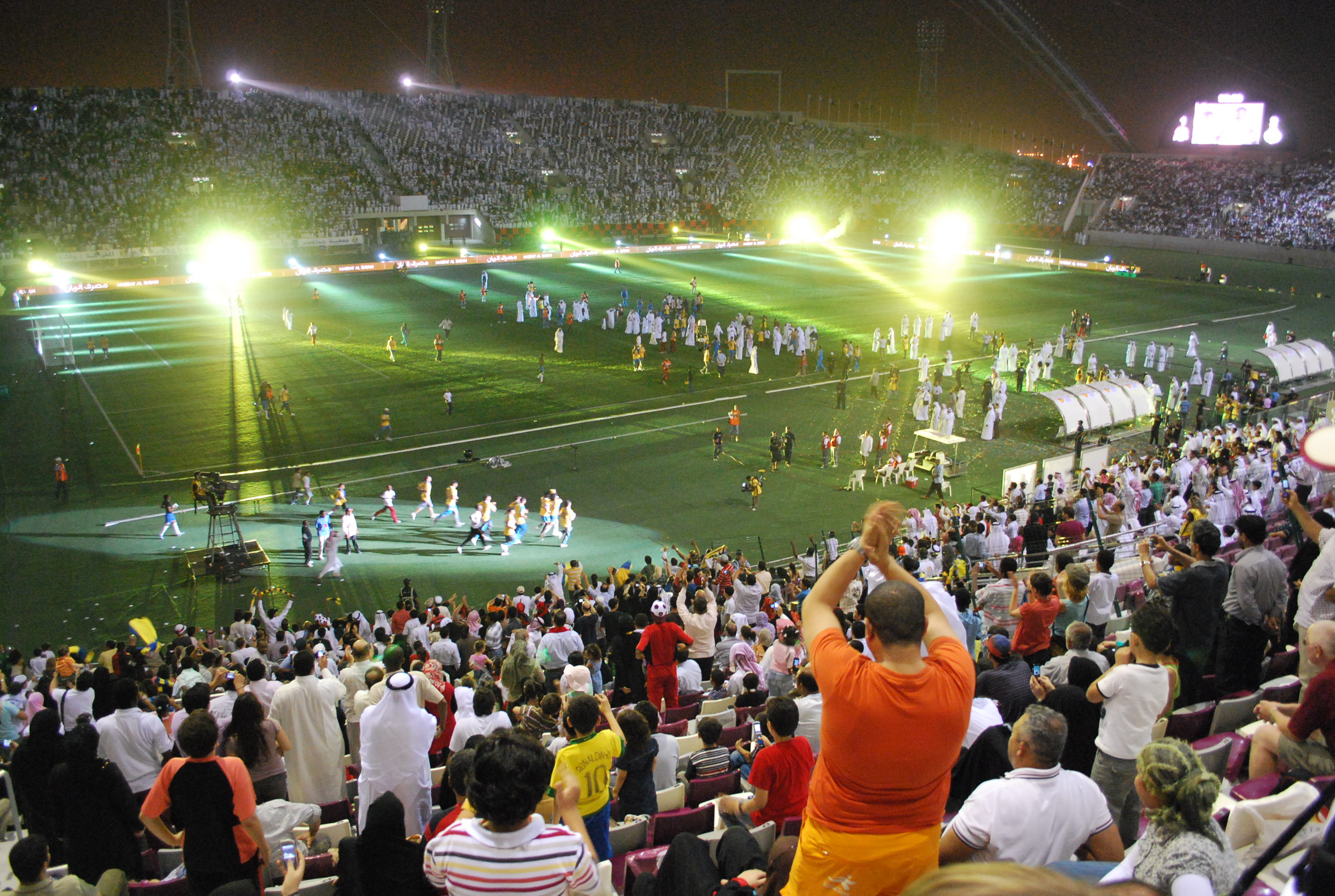
Qatar Emir Cup in 2009

Statistics accurate as of 2013.

Sport	Female	Male	Total
Football	316	5,156	5,472
Swimming	41	2,361	2,402
Athletics	0	2,043	2,043
Handball	53	1,855	1,908
Taekwondo; Judo	295	1,178	1,473
Volleyball	107	1357	1,464
Basketball	43	997	1,040
Fencing	255	499	754
Field hockey	196	481	677
Karate	95	422	517
Table tennis	30	402	432
Tennis	69	211	280
Billiards; Snooker	0	190	190

Sport	Female	Male	Total
Endurance riding	30	118	148
Gymnastics	69	66	135
Bowling	0	122	122
Equestrian sports	13	86	99
Golf	8	57	65
Chess	32	29	61
Wrestling	0	56	56
Boxing	0	56	56
Squash	0	49	49
Sailing; Rowing	4	24	28
Weightlifting; Bodybuilding	0	22	22

== Major sport events in Qatar ==
- 2004 - 2004 Asian Men's Handball Championship - hosted
- 2004 - ITTF World Team Table Tennis Championships - hosted
- 2005 - Asian Basketball Championships - hosted
- 2005 - World Weightlifting Championships - hosted
- 2005 - West Asian Games - hosted
- 2006 - Asian Sailing Championships - hosted
- 2006 - 2006 Asian Games - hosted
- 2008 - Asian Indoor Athletics Championships - hosted
- 2008 - Asian Youth Wrestling Championships - hosted
- 2008 - Asian Optimist Sailing Championships - hosted
- 2009 - Asian Fencing Championships - hosted
- 2009 - FIVB Club World Championships - hosted
- 2009 - ISF World Gymnasiade - hosted
- 2009 - 2009 Asian Airgun Championships- hosted
- 2010 - IAAF World Indoor Championships - hosted
- 2010 - ISAF World Junior 470 Sailing C'ships - hosted
- 2011 - 2011 AFC Asian Cup - hosted
- 2011 - 2011 Pan Arab Games - hosted
- 2012 - 2012 Asian Shooting Championships - hosted
- 2014 - 2014 FINA World Swimming Championships (25 m) - hosted
- 2015 - IHF Handball World Championships - hosted
- 2015 - Doha 2015 IPC Athletics World Championships
- 2015 - World Amateur Boxing Championships - hosted
- 2015 - World Robot Olympiad - hosted
- 2016 - UCI Road Cycling World Championships - hosted
- 2018 - FIG Artistic Gymnastics World Championships - hosted
- 2019 - World Athletics Championships - hosted
- 2019 - 2019 World Beach Games - hosted
- 2019 - FIFA Club World Cup - hosted
- 2019 - 2019 Asian Shooting Championships - hosted
- 2020 - FIFA Club World Cup - hosted
- 2021 - FIFA Arab Cup - hosted
- 2022 - FIFA World Cup - hosted
- 2023 - World Judo Championships - hosted
- 2024 - AFC Asian Cup - hosted
- 2024 - FINA World Aquatics Championships - hosted
- 2024 - FINA Masters - hosted
- 2025 - FIFA Arab Cup - hosted
- 2025 - FIFA U-17 World Cup - hosted
- 2026 - FIFA U-17 World Cup - hosted
- 2027 - FIBA Basketball World Cup
- 2027 - FIFA U-17 World Cup
- 2028 - FIFA U-17 World Cup
- 2029 - FIFA U-17 World Cup
- 2029 - FIFA Arab Cup
- 2030 - Asian Games
- 2033 - FIFA Arab Cup
- 2036 - Olympic Games - bidding

=== Annual Events ===
- since 1993 - ATP Qatar ExxonMobil Open
- since 1998 - European Tour Golf Commercial Bank Qatar Masters
- since 2004 - FIM Moto Racing World Championships
- since 2008 - FEI Equestrian Global Champions Tour
- since 2001 - WTA Qatar Open
- since 2010 - World Athletics Diamond League
- 2002 & 2010-2018 - Handball IHF Men's Super Globe
- 2009-2012 - FIVB Men's Volleyball Club World Championship

=== Failed Bids ===
- 2020 - Olympic Games

== See also ==
- Khalifa International Stadium
- Qatar at the Olympics
- Qatari folk games
