= Economy of Qatar =

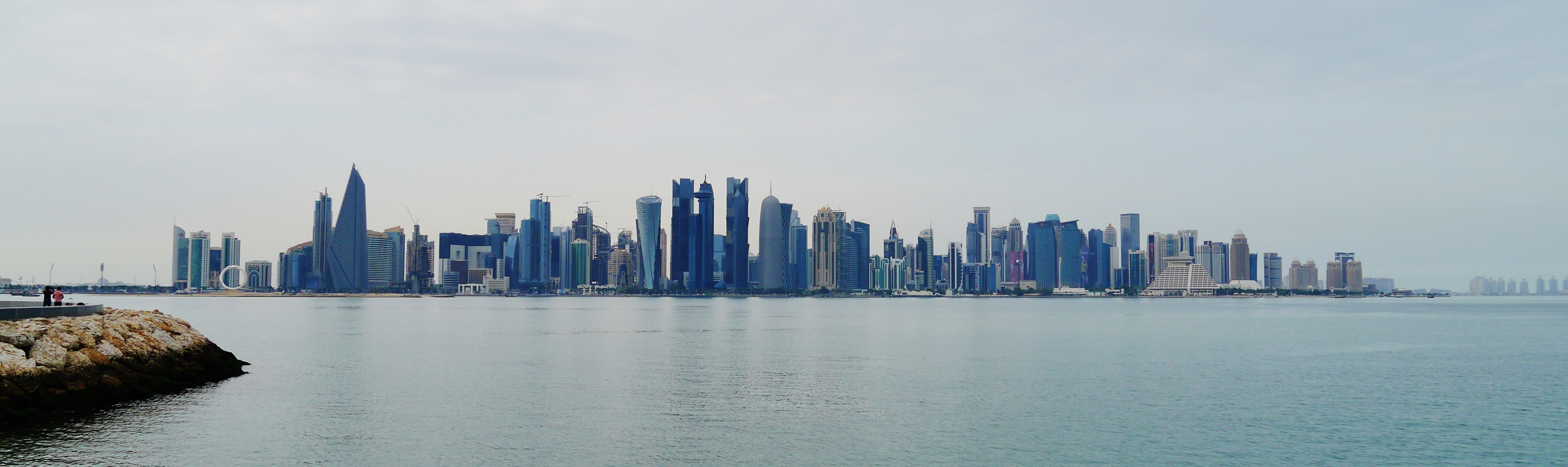
- West Bay, Doha, the financial centre of Qatar
- Currency: Qatari riyal (QAR, QR)
- Trade organisations: WTO and GCC
- Country group: Developing/Emerging; High-income economy

Statistics
- Population: ▲3,370,611 (March, 2026)
- GDP: ▲$240.217 billion (nominal, 2025); ▲$369.24 billion (PPP, 2025
- GDP rank: 55th (nominal, 2024); 60th (PPP, 2024)
- GDP growth: 1.5% (2024f)
- GDP per capita: ▲$72,760 (nominal, 2025); ▲$118,760 (PPP, 2025)
- GDP per capita rank: 8th (nominal, 2024); 4th (PPP, 2024)
- GDP per capita growth: ▼ -4.9% (2024)
- GDP by sector: agriculture: 0.2%; industry: 50.3%; services: 49.5%; (2017 est.)
- Inflation (CPI): ▼3.1% (2023); ▼2.6% (2024f est.)
- Human Development Index: ▲0.886 very high (2023) (40th)
- Labour force: ▲2,035,269 (2023)
- Unemployment: 0.6% (2017 est.)
- Main industries: Liquefied natural gas; crude oil; ammonia; fertilizer; petrochemicals; reinforcing steel; cement; ship repair

External
- Exports: ▲$128.709 billion (2023 est.)
- Export goods: Liquefied natural gas, Petroleum products, Fertilizers, Steel
- Main export partners: Bangladesh 28.75%; Japan 24.06.1%; South Korea22.13%; Hong Kong 13.4%; European Union 7.64%; United Kingdom4.68%(2019)
- Imports: ▼$26.69 billion (2017 est.)
- Import goods: Machinery and transport equipment, Food, Chemicals
- Main import partners: European Union 29.13%; United States23.41%; South Korea 10.75; Hong Kong 8.56%; Pakistan 4.17%; Turkey 3.65%; (2019)
- Gross external debt: $168 billion (31 December 2017 est.)

Public finance
- Government debt: ▼44.5% of GDP (2022)
- Revenue: $297.70 billion (2022)
- Spending: $208.70 billion (2022)
- Credit rating: Standard & Poor's: AA (Domestic); AA (Foreign); AA+ (T&C Assessment); Outlook: Stable; Moody's: Aa2; Outlook: Stable
- All values, unless otherwise stated, are in US dollars.

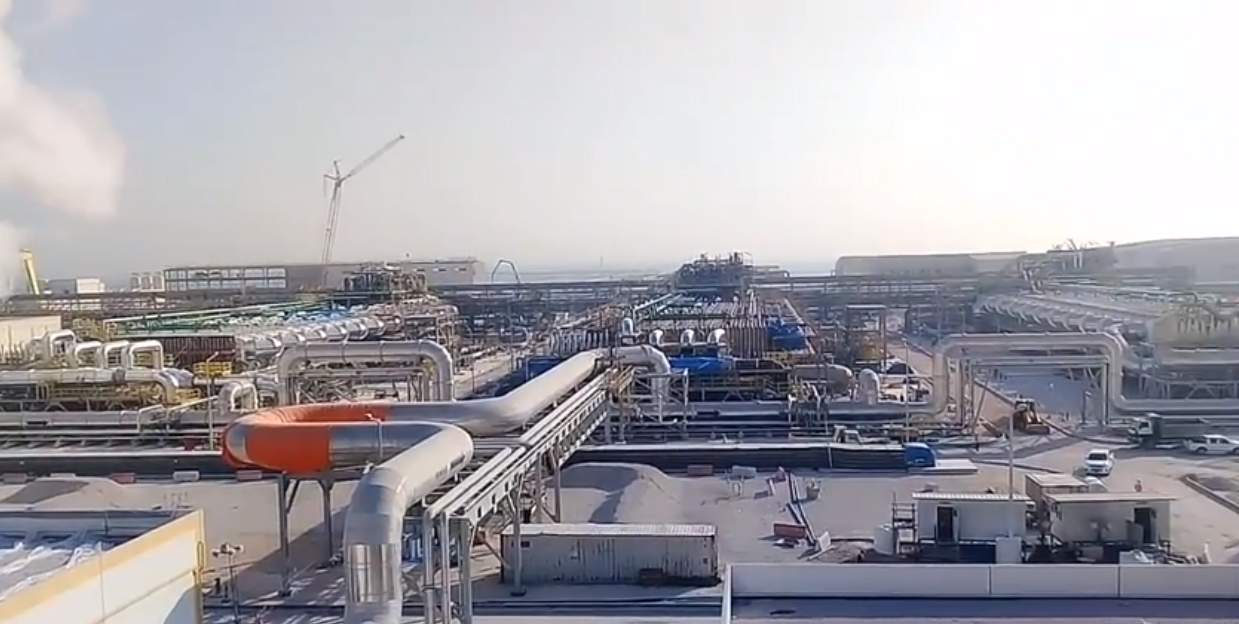
Infrastructure in an industrial area at Doha

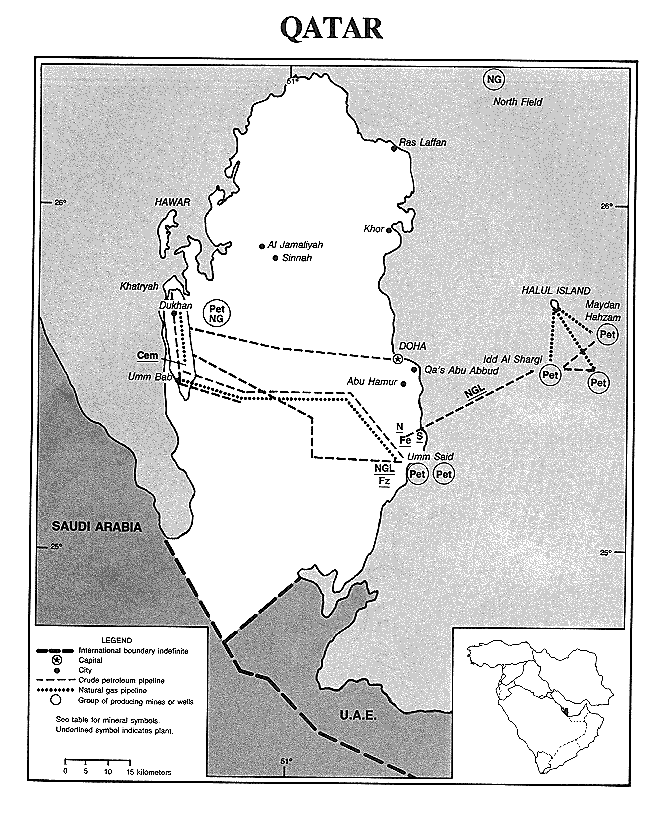
Map showing the mineral resources of Qatar.

The economy of Qatar is one of the highest in the world based on GDP per capita, ranking generally among the top ten richest countries on world rankings for 2015 and 2016 data compiled by the World Bank, the United Nations, and the International Monetary Fund (IMF). Qatar is sometimes considered as having a mixed economy system.

Petroleum and natural gas are the cornerstones of Qatar's economy and account for more than 70% of total government revenue, more than 60% of gross domestic product, and roughly 85% of export earnings. Qatar has the world's third largest proven natural gas reserve and is the third-largest exporter of natural gas.

== History ==
For centuries, Qatar's economy relied heavily on pearl diving, fishing, and nomadic pastoralism. Towns such as Al Zubarah flourished in the 18th century as centers for regional exchange and trade. In 1939, crude oil was first discovered in Dukhan, though commercial extraction and export would only accelerated significantly following World War II. Following independence in 1971, it nationalized its oil operations and achieved steady revenue growth through the 1970s and 1980s. The discovery and development of the colossal offshore South Pars/North Dome Gas-Condensate field changed the economic trajectory of the nation. Massive investments in liquefaction technology transformed Qatar into one of the world's leading exporters of liquefied natural gas (LNG), yielding one of the highest per capita incomes globally. Qatar established major global entities such as Qatar Airways and Al Jazeera, alongside massive infrastructure and educational investments via Qatar National Vision 2030.

== Energy sector ==
Before the emergence of petrol-based industry, Qatar was a poor pearl diving country. The exploration of oil and gas fields began in 1939. In 1973, oil production and revenues increased dramatically, moving Qatar out of the ranks of the world's poorest countries and providing it with one of the highest per capita incomes in the world.

Qatar's economy was in a downturn from 1982 to 1989. OPEC (Organization of Petroleum Exporting Countries) quotas on crude oil production, the lower price for oil, and the generally unpromising outlook on international markets reduced oil earnings. In turn, the Qatari government's spending plans had to be cut to match lower income. The resulting recessionary local business climate caused many firms to lay off expatriate staff. With the economy recovering in the 1990s, expatriate populations, particularly from Egypt and South Asia, have grown again.

Crude oil decline rates from existing fields are high, as all of Qatar’s oil fields are mature. However, large natural gas reserves have been located off Qatar's northeast coast. These offshore gas fields also may contain significant oil and condensate reserves. For example, the state owned QatarEnergy corporation found two offshore oil fields in the 1960s. At the time production was too expensive. However, technological development led to production over 30 years later.

The gas condensate can be refined to usual oil products in specialised refineries. The costs are a bit higher but it is normal today for companies to use the gas condensate too. Oil offshore production in 2008 for PS-2 and PS-3 blocks was about 31.1 million barrels (84,995 b/d). Joint Ventures facilities (PS-1, ALK, K & A): Combined oil production from these three joint venture production facilities in 2008 was 57.4 million barrels (156,873 b/d). Like with gas fields there are more offshore blocks which need to be explored and could increase the oil output. So the 500,000 bpd peak and a depletion in 2023 is delayed. With higher oil prices it is expected that the offshore exploration of oil and/or natural gas fields will go on. Oil production in June 2016 seemed to be around 670,000 barrels per day, a bit down from February 2016 production of 692,000 barrels per day. Taking all liquids together Qatar is already far beyond a million barrels per day.

Qatar's proved reserves of gas are the third-largest in the world, exceeding 7000 km^{3} (250 trillion cubic feet). The economy was boosted in 1991 by completion of the $1.5-billion Phase I of North Field gas development. In 1996, the Qatargas project began exporting liquefied natural gas (LNG) to Japan. Further phases of North Field gas development costing billions of dollars are in various stages of planning and development.

Qatar's heavy industrial projects, all based in Umm Said, include a refinery with a 50,000 barrels (8,000 m^{3}) per day capacity, a fertilizer plant for urea and ammonia, a steel plant, and a petrochemical plant. All these industries use gas for fuel. Most are joint ventures between European and Japanese firms and the state-owned QatarEnergy corporation (formerly QGPC). The U.S. is the major equipment supplier for Qatar's oil and gas industry, and U.S. companies are playing a major role in North Field gas development.

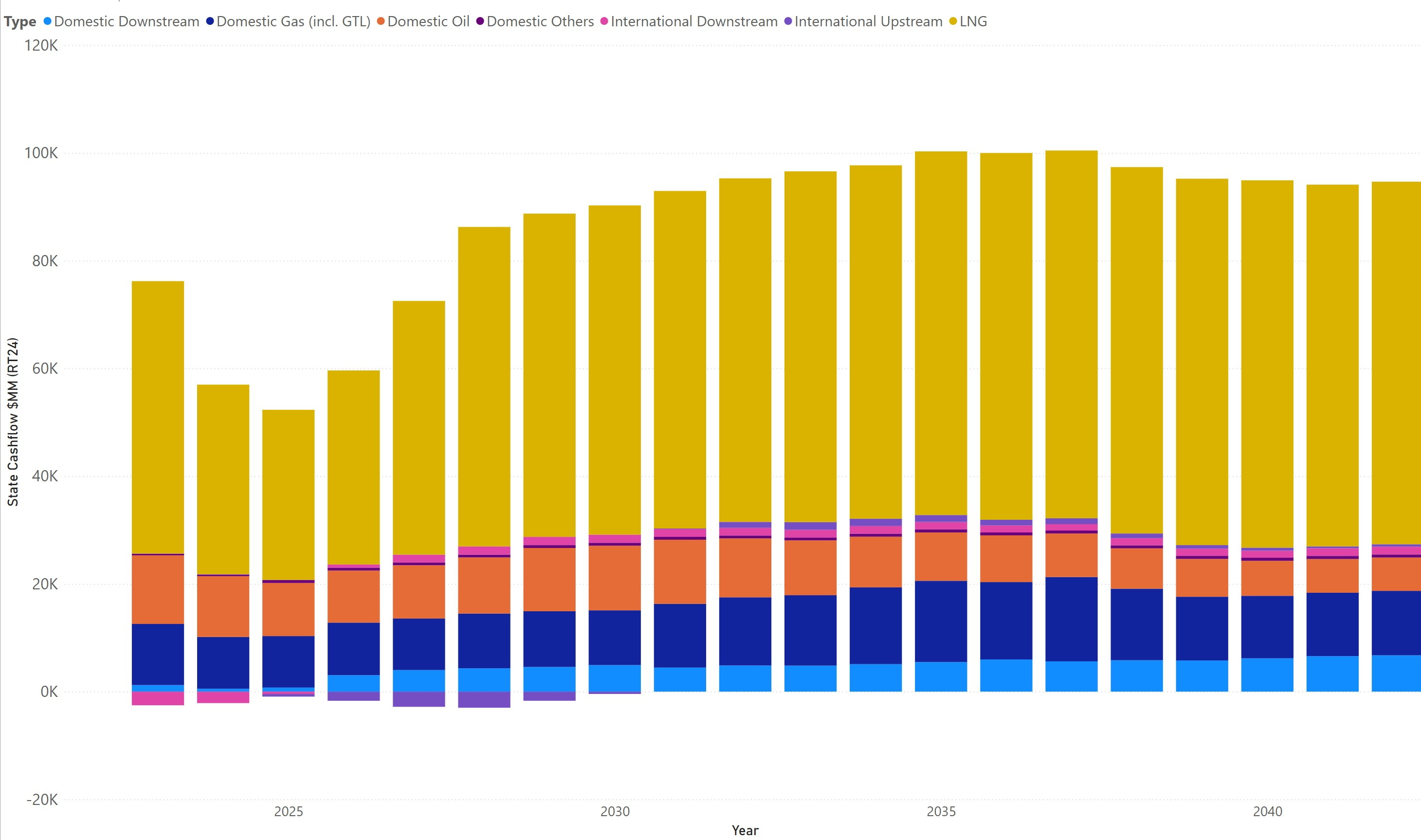
Qatar Energy State Cashflow contribution business plan 2024

== Industry ==
The government considers industry to be an integral part of its plan to diversify the economy and maximize its huge natural gas reserves, which serve as the primary feed stock for the sector. Accordingly, careful planning has gone into industrial development. With an eye towards exports, development has been clustered around the ports of Ras Laffan Industrial City and Mesaieed Industrial Area, which are key centers of energy. The result has seen considerable growth over the years. Industries Qatar (IQ), a producer of petrochemicals, fertilizers and steel, is a regional powerhouse, surpassed only in size by Saudi Basic Industries Corporation (SABIC), the Middle East's largest chemical producer. In 2007 the manufacturing sector made the third-largest contribution to GDP among non-oil and gas sectors, equivalent to about 7.5% of GDP. Industry in Qatar is regulated by the Ministry of Business and Trade.

Petrochemicals and fertilizers supply make up a large portion of the industrial base, along with steel and other construction materials, through Qatar Steel and Qatar Primary Material Company (QPMC). Indeed, over the past few years, demand for construction materials experienced a major surge as the development boom swept the Persian Gulf region. The 2008 financial crisis reduced demand in the region, as project credit lines dry up and investor sentiment remains cautious. The crisis impacted the whole of the industrial sector – IQ saw its net profit drop in the fourth quarter of 2008 more than 90% over the same period the previous year. But in relative terms, the sector has fared better than most and IQ still managed to post an annual profit of $2bn. Large profit chunks from years past have been channeled into capital investments, which should help the sector ride out the storm.

=== North Field LNG project ===
On 8 February 2021, the world's largest LNG supplier, Qatar Petroleum (now QatarEnergy), signed an EPC-contract with Chiyoda and Technip for the North Field East (NFE) expansion project to increase QE's annually LNG output by 40% until 2026. For the $28.7 billion NFE expansion project, QatarEnergy has partnered with five global energy companies that have acquired 25% stake in the project. These include Shell, TotalEnergies and ExxonMobil, each with 6.25%, and Eni and ConocoPhillips, each with 3.125% stakes. In a first phase, LNG export capacity is expected to increase from 77 million tons per year to 110 million tons per year by 2026.

On 20 June 2022, Minister of State for Energy Saad Sherida Al-Kaabi said that the expected production increase from this project will be 32.6 million tonnes annually. Ethane produced from the project would be 1.5 million tonnes per year, LPG 4 million tonnes per year, helium 5,000 tonnes per year, as well as 250,000 barrels of condensate per day.

In a second phase, the North Field South (NFS) project, Shell and TotalEnergies have each acquired 9.375% and ConocoPhillips 6.25% stakes. QatarEnergy plans to increase LNG production with the NFS project to 126 million tons per year beginning in 2028.

In April 2023, Sinopec acquired a 5% stake in an 8 million tonnes per year LNG train.

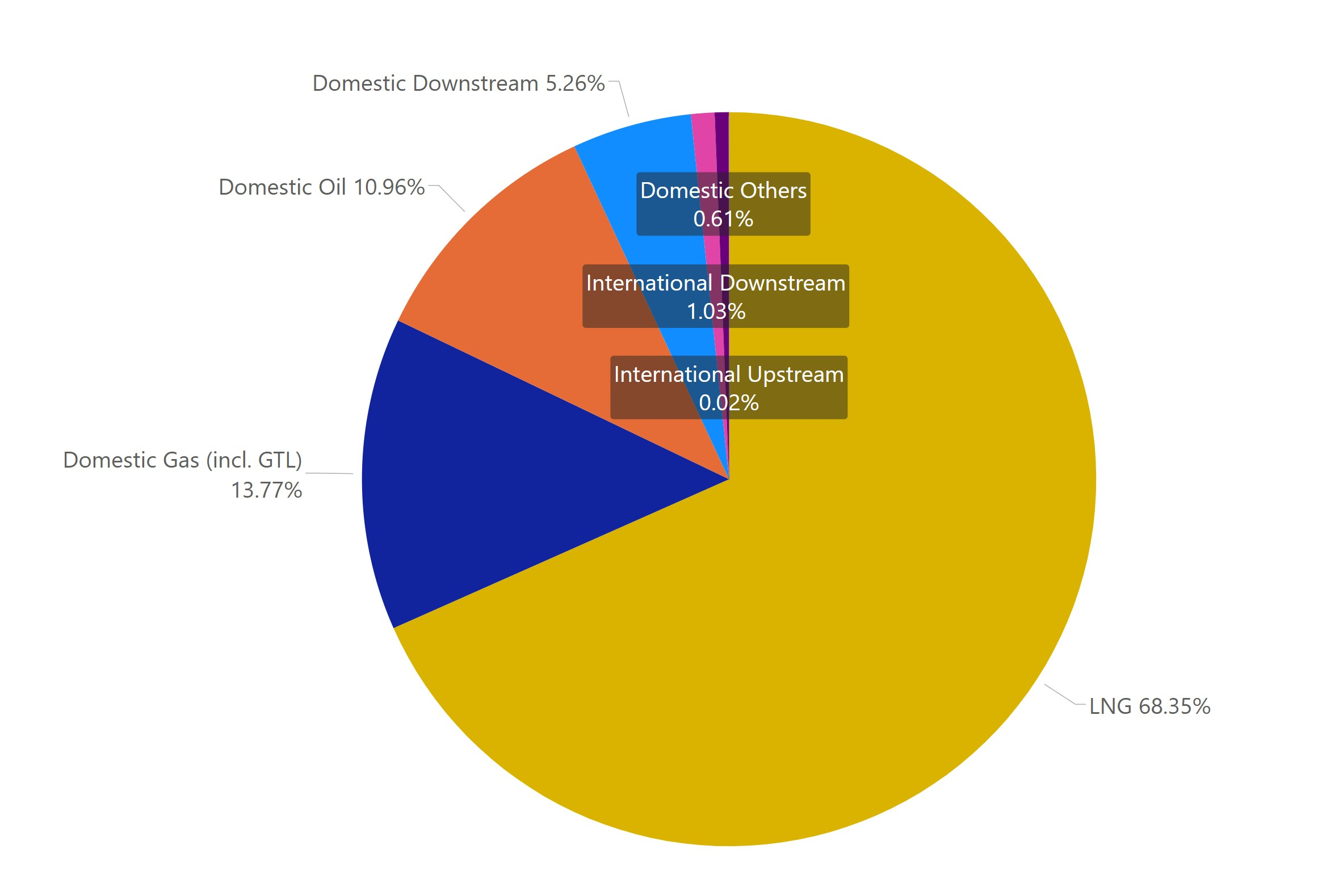
Cashflow contribution to the State of Qatar by energy sector (Qatar Energy BP24)

== Agriculture sector ==
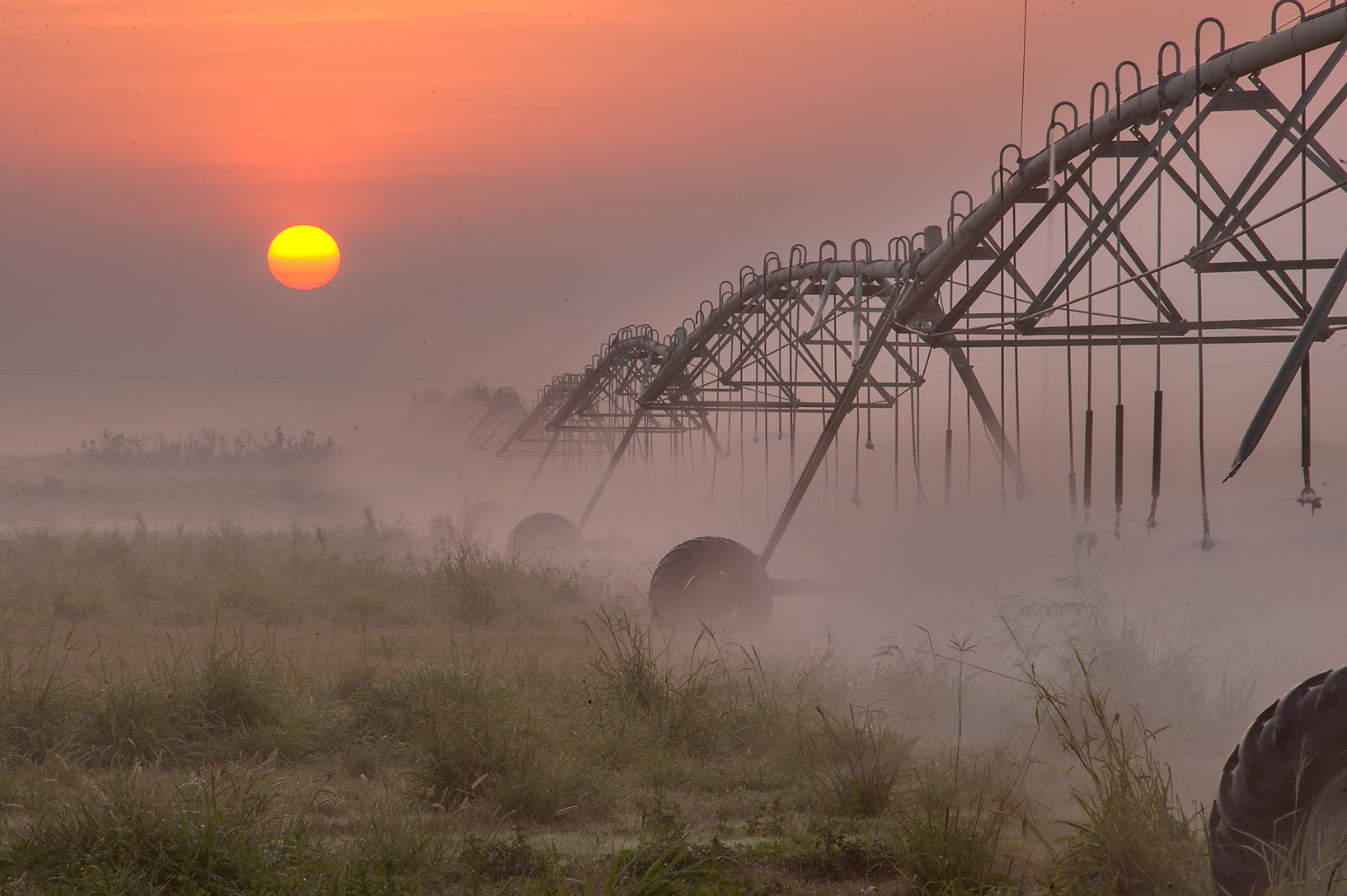
Center-pivot irrigation system at Al Rekayya Farms in central Qatar

Agriculture in Qatar is inherently limited in scope due to the harsh climate and lack of arable land. In spite of this, small-scale farming, nomadic herding, and fishing were the predominant means of subsistence in the region prior to the 20th century. Sea-based activities such as pearling and fishing served as the primary sources of income for Qataris until the commencement of oil drilling in 1939.

Although the relative importance of these activities has declined as a means of livelihood (with commercial pearling disappearing completely), the government has attempted to encourage agriculture and fishing to provide a degree of self-sufficiency in food.

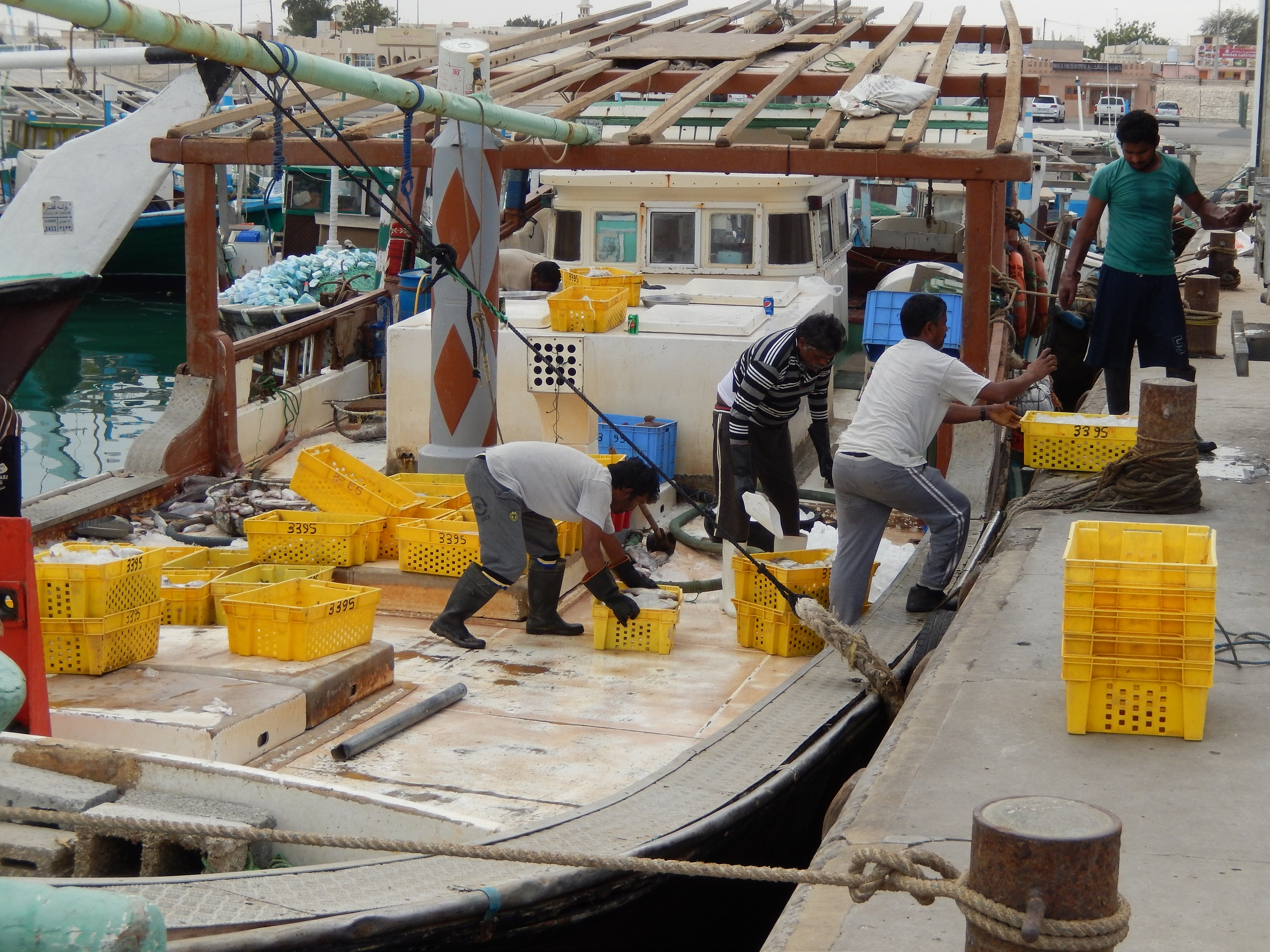
Scene in the harbour of Al Khor. Fisheries is a minor sector in Qatar, and production is almost exclusively for domestic consumption.

== Financial sector ==
The Qatari banking sector managed to escape the direct impact of the global subprime fallout, but was not altogether unscathed by its aftershocks. Overall, it was the best performing of the Gulf Cooperation Council markets in the last quarter of 2008 and most banks posted substantial profits for 2008. But the sector is also facing issues of liquidity, declining customer confidence and a forced reluctance to lend. In a bid to strengthen the banks’ positions, the Qatar Investment Authority (QIA) announced in early 2009 that it was willing to take a 10-20% stake in any interested local listed banks by way of a capital injection, although this was later reduced to 5% stakes and an additional 5% at the end of 2009.

The Qatari government also announced in March 2009 that it was planning to buy the investment portfolio of the banks in the hope this would encourage them to continue lending. Cautious sector sentiment has also been compounded by the Qatar Central Bank's (QCB's) lending restrictions, which demand a loan-to-deposit ratio of 90%. Given the high level of integration between Qatar's economy and the Persian Gulf region, as well as the wider world, a slowdown in business and banking activity seemed inevitable. Nevertheless, Qatar's banking sector has been faring relatively well, considering the strife experienced in other countries, and insiders are confident that activity will return to its previous brisk pace in the second half of 2009 as confidence slowly rebuilds around the globe.

The International Monetary Fund in its spring assessment 2019 said that Qatar has "successfully absorbed the shocks" of the blockade imposed in 2017 and the dropped oil prices from 2014 to 2016. S&P Global had marked Qatar's outlook to negative in 2017, but changed it to stable in 2019.

In August 2019, Qatar Central Bank stated that the country's economic growth will see a boost over the next two years amid expectations of stable oil prices and continued strong exports. The GDP is expected to grow at an average rate of 2.8% between 2018 and 2020, with the budget surplus falling to 4.35 billion riyals in 2019, from a surplus of 15.1 billion riyals in 2018.

Qatar's GDP is anticipated to scale up to $208 billion in 2024 from $162 billion in 2022, according to a report by FocusEconomics. The World Bank has projected Qatar's economy to be the fastest growing in the GCC in 2023 and 2024.

=== Islamic finance ===
The Islamic finance sector enjoyed increased activity in 2008 and is expected to continue to grow into 2009 as more sophisticated financial instruments spark the interest of investors. In addition to Islamic banks, such as Qatar Islamic Bank (QIB), Qatar International Islamic Bank (QIIB) and newcomer Masraf Al Rayyan, conventional banks have also been entering the sharia-compliant sector and are coming to view an Islamic subsidiary as a virtual necessity in order to maintain market standing. Islamic banks currently take the lion's share of sharia-compliant business, though the conventional banks are working hard to take a greater share of market activity. Both Islamic banks and Islamic subsidiaries did remarkably well in the first three quarters of 2008, during which overall financing activity increased by 70.6% compared to the same period in the previous year. The 2008 financial crisis slowed this growth. Poor market conditions have contributed to a marked slowdown of Islamic bond, or sukuk, activity in 2008 throughout the Persian Gulf. But other segments, such as Islamic insurance, or takaful, have not seen a similar downturn. Overall, challenges to further growth remain, including a lack of qualified staff to meet the growing demand for sharia-compliant banking services.

=== Capital market ===
The stock market capitalisation of listed companies in Qatar was valued at $95,487 million in 2007 by the World Bank. As 2008 drew to a close, no capital markets around the globe, including Qatar's, were immune to the effects of the sub-prime fallout. That said, there is considerable optimism that Qatar's bourse, the Doha Securities Market (DSM), will remain relatively resilient to the ongoing international turbulence. It has followed the same peak-trough trajectory as many others around the globe, hitting record highs in mid-2008, before diving in late 2008 and early 2009. Between December 2006 and July 2008 the DSM Index rose about 117% before the 2008 financial crisis wiped out most of these gains. In the first few months of 2009, the DSM lost about 40% of its value. In an effort to stave off further losses, the government announced in February 2009 that it would step in to buy up shares of troubled banks amounting to about 10% of the market's capitalisation. The move improved investor optimism and is hoped to prevent the market from falling further. The proposal to create a single unified regulator as early as 2010 to oversee all banking and financial services is viewed as another promising development that will transform the financial sector for the better.

== Real estate sector ==
Real estate is a significant and increasingly regulated sector of the Qatari economy, encompassing residential, commercial and mixed-use property and centred on the capital, Doha. Ownership of land was historically restricted to Qatari nationals, but reforms from the early 2000s, accelerating after Law No. 16 of 2018 on non-Qatari ownership and use of real estate, opened designated zones to non-Qatari individuals and companies. The sector is overseen by the Ministry of Justice and, since 2023, by a dedicated Real Estate Regulatory Authority known as Aqarat.

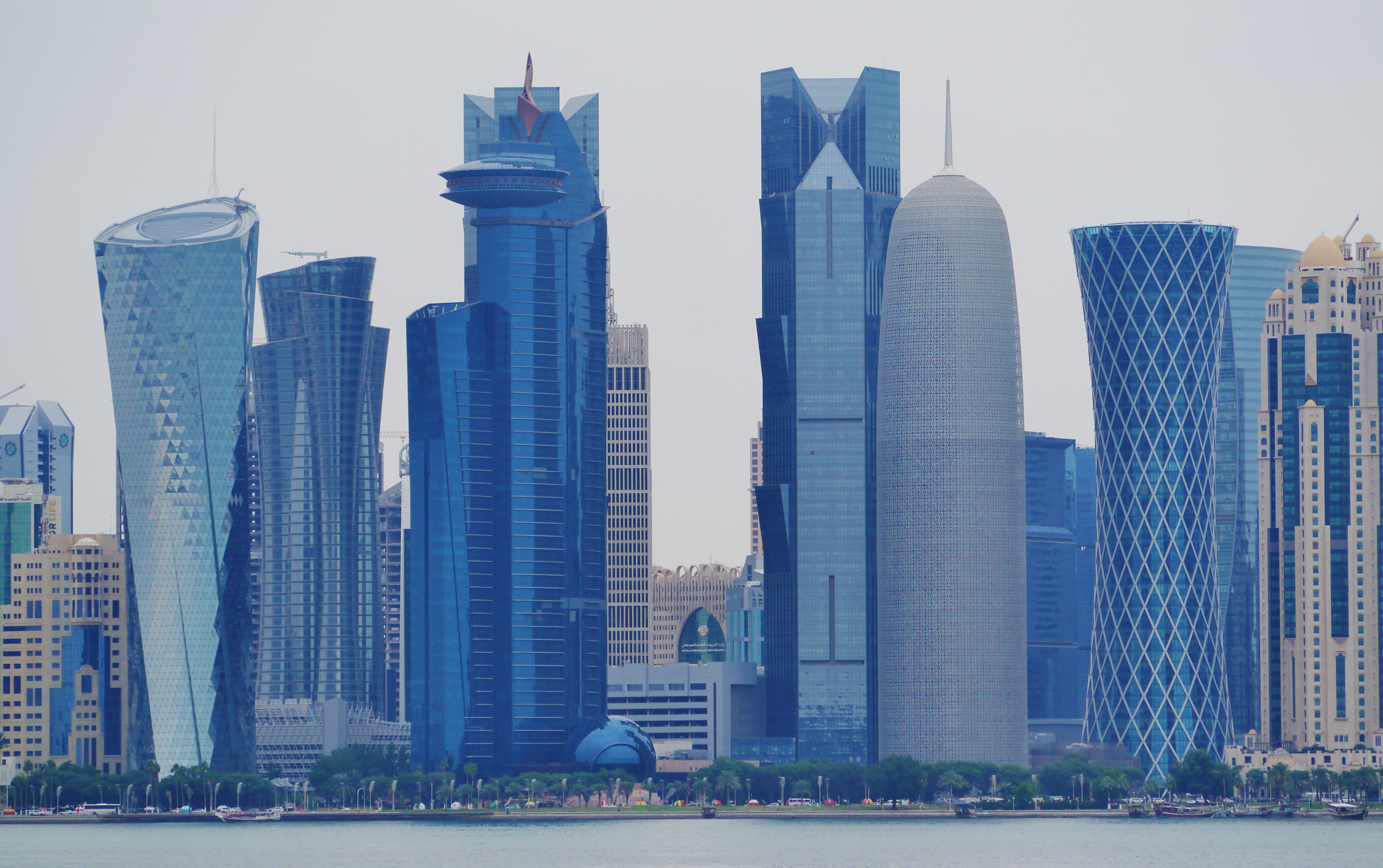
Al Dafna Central business district

=== Non-Qatari ownership ===
Council of Ministers Decision No. 28 of 2020 implemented Law No. 16 of 2018 and designated twenty-five areas for non-Qatari ownership or use: nine freehold areas and sixteen usufruct areas where rights may be granted for up to 99 years, renewable by agreement. Freehold confers full ownership with rights to sell, mortgage and bequeath, while usufruct grants a long-term right to use and exploit the property. The freehold areas include Legtaifiya (West Bay Lagoon), The Pearl, Al Khor resort, Lusail, Al Kharaej, Jebel Thuaileb (Fox Hills), Al Dafna and Onaiza; the usufruct areas include Mushaireb, Freej Bin Mahmoud, Najma, Al Sadd and others within central Doha. Non-Qataris may additionally own a single residential unit in residential complexes and offices or shops in commercial complexes anywhere in the country, and vacant land must be built upon within four years of acquisition. Property ownership confers residency entitlements: holdings worth at least QAR 730,000 entitle the owner to a renewable residency permit without a local sponsor, while holdings of at least QAR 3,650,000 entitle the owner to permanent-residency-type benefits including healthcare, education and certain investment privileges.

=== Regulation and registration ===
All property dispositions creating, transferring or extinguishing real rights must be entered in the Real Estate Register, which is administered by the Real Estate Registration Department of the Ministry of Justice and which charges a transfer fee of 0.25% of the property value on sale. Law No. 5 of 2024 replaced the 1964 registration regime and introduced electronic registration for the first time, giving digital documents and signatures the same legal effect as paper originals; the law is delivered through the ministry's SAK e-services platform, with related online services hosted on the Hukoomi e-government portal. By Amiri Decision No. 28 of 2023 the Real Estate Regulatory Authority (Aqarat) was established under the Ministry of Municipality to license developers, brokers and property managers and to regulate off-plan sales, while the Qatar Central Bank compiles the Real Estate Price Index from Ministry of Justice transaction data.

=== Market and major developments ===
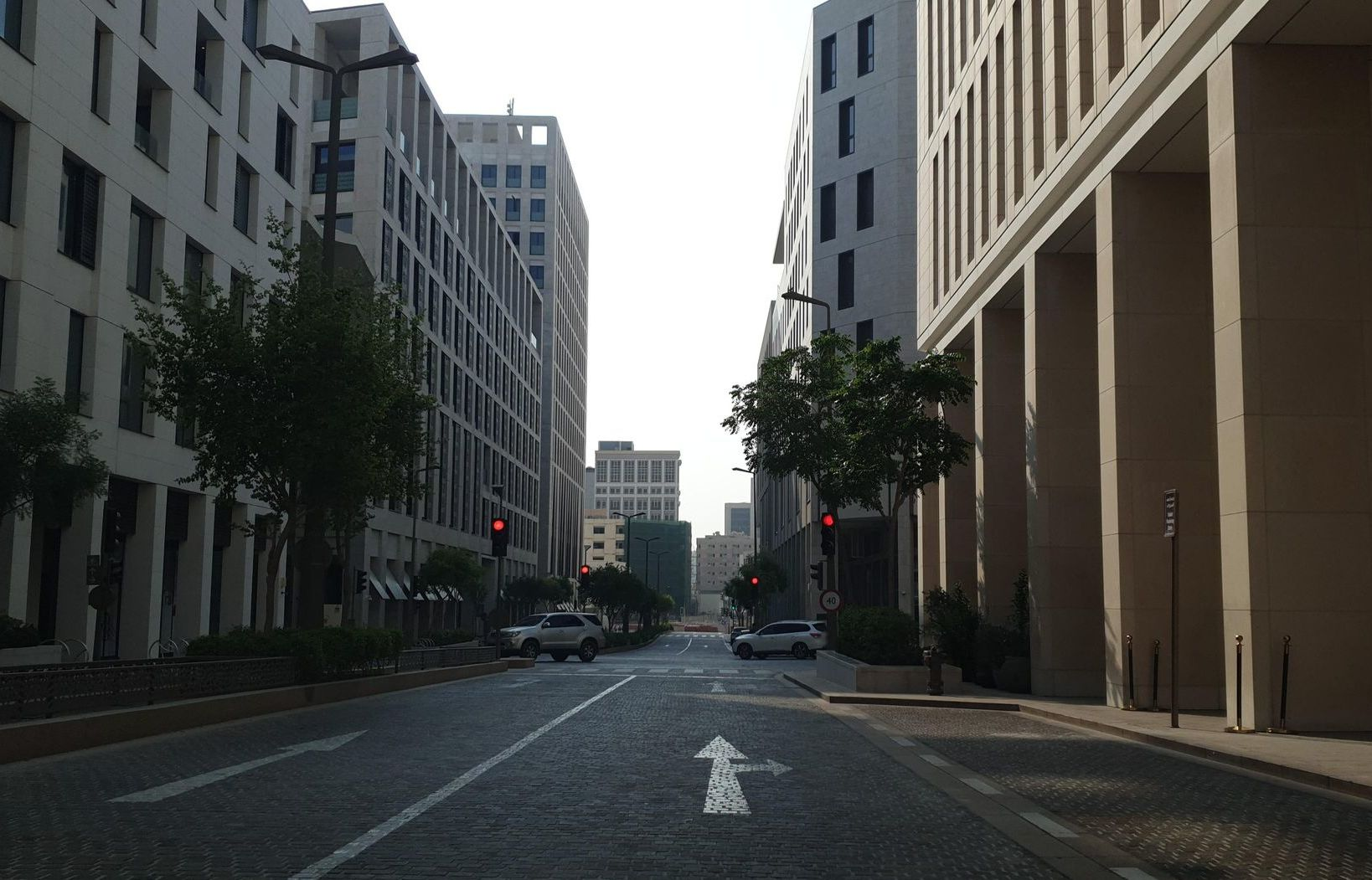
Msheireb Downtown Doha

According to the National Planning Council's National Statistics Center, real estate activities grew by 6.3%, from QR 12.7 billion to QR 13.5 billion, in figures published in its March 2025 release on gross domestic product. Flagship freehold projects include The Pearl, an artificial island off Doha and the first area opened to non-Qatari freehold ownership; Lusail, a planned coastal city developed by real estate firm Qatari Diar; and Msheireb Downtown Doha, a mixed-use regeneration of the historic city centre noted for one of the highest concentrations of LEED-certified buildings worldwide. The largest real estate firm in the country is Barwa Group. Properties for sale and rent are marketed through licensed brokers and online portals, including the regional platform Property Finder and the Qatar-focused listings site Arady Qatar, which organises searches by Qatari municipal zone numbers and publishes indicative per-square-metre prices for land, apartments and villas across Qatar. Ownership and brokerage licensing can be verified through the Ministry of Justice and Aqarat.

== Education sector ==
The education system in Qatar is jointly directed and controlled by the Supreme Education Council (SEC) and the Ministry of Education and Higher Education (MOEHE) at all levels. The SEC is responsible for overseeing independent schools, whereas the MOE is responsible for providing support to private schools. Formal schooling officially began in 1956. Primary schooling is obligatory for every child and is free in public schools.

Education in Qatar is very diverse, with several schools representing a variety of international curriculum systems. There are approximately 338 international schools in the country. Several prestigious universities from around the world have satellite campuses in the country in Education City and within the suburbs of the capital Doha.

== Healthcare sector ==
Sidra Medical and Research Center

Healthcare in Qatar is regulated by the Ministry of Public Health. Healthcare practitioners are regulated by the Department of Healthcare Professions (DHP). The healthcare system can be divided into the public (governmental) sector, and the private sector. Public healthcare is provided by Primary Health Care Corporation (PHCC) for primary healthcare, and Hamad Medical Corporation (HMC) which operate secondary and tertiary healthcare centers, among other services. Specialized centers such as Sidra Medicine and Aspetar are outside the scope of HMC.

Healthcare standards in Qatar are generally high. Approximately 8.4% of GDP goes to health related expenditures. Qatar's healthcare spending per capita is among the highest in the Middle East, with $4.7 billion being invested in healthcare in 2014. This was a $2.1 billion increase from 2010.

In the public sector, the health expenditures of Qatari citizens are covered by the state, in accordance with Article 23 of the Qatari constitution. Expatriates must either receive health insurance from their employers, or in the case of the self-employed, purchase insurance.

== Retail and hospitality sector ==
Qatar's retail market is estimated at around USD 19.44 billion, driven by e-commerce expansion, high-end luxury demand, and smart electronics that underscored the sector's continued resilience and its growing role as one of the country's leading non-hydrocarbon industries.

== Telecommunications sector ==
Telecommunications in Qatar is the development and infrastructure of communication systems in Qatar, including telephones, broadcasting, and internet services.

== Tourism sector ==
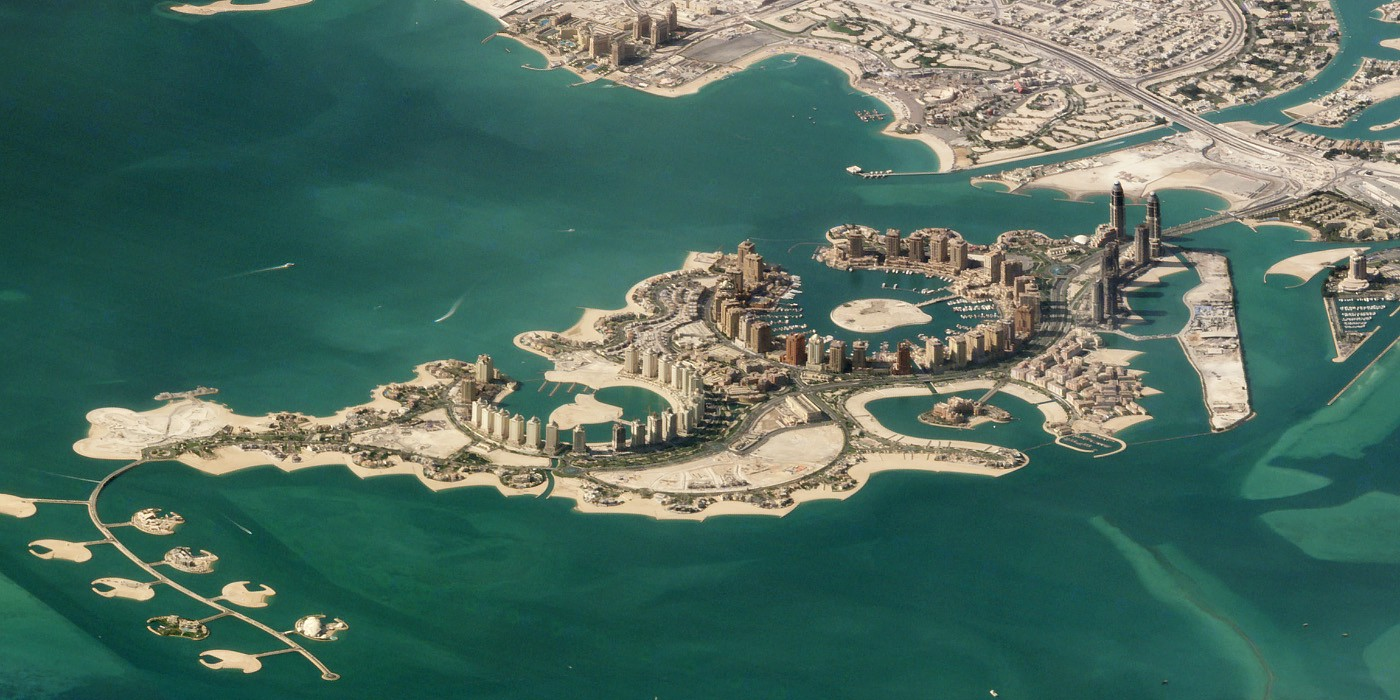
The Pearl Qatar

Under the ambitious five-year development plan of the Qatar Tourism and Exhibitions Authority (QTEA), the government aimed to boost the number of visitors from 964,000 as of 2007 to 1.5m by 2010. The funding required to meet this goal was present in sufficient amounts; in 2008 the state allocated some $17bn for tourism development through 2014, most of which was allocated towards hotels, exhibition space and infrastructure. In order to keep up with a rising number of visitors, the government set a goal of increasing hotel capacity 400% by 2012. In addition to financial support, the government has also worked to ease business regulations in a bid to increase private sector activity. A major aspect of expansion plans is the Hamad International Airport, which has the capacity to handle up to 24m passengers.

Qatar Airways is an airline owned by the Qatar government and was founded in 1993. It travels to over a hundred destinations.

Other niche tourism segments receiving special focus include cultural tourism on the back of the high publicity opening of Doha's Museum of Islamic Art, and sports tourism, initially spurred by the Asian Games, to which Qatar played host in 2006. Qatar hosted the 2022 FIFA World cup.

== Transport sector ==
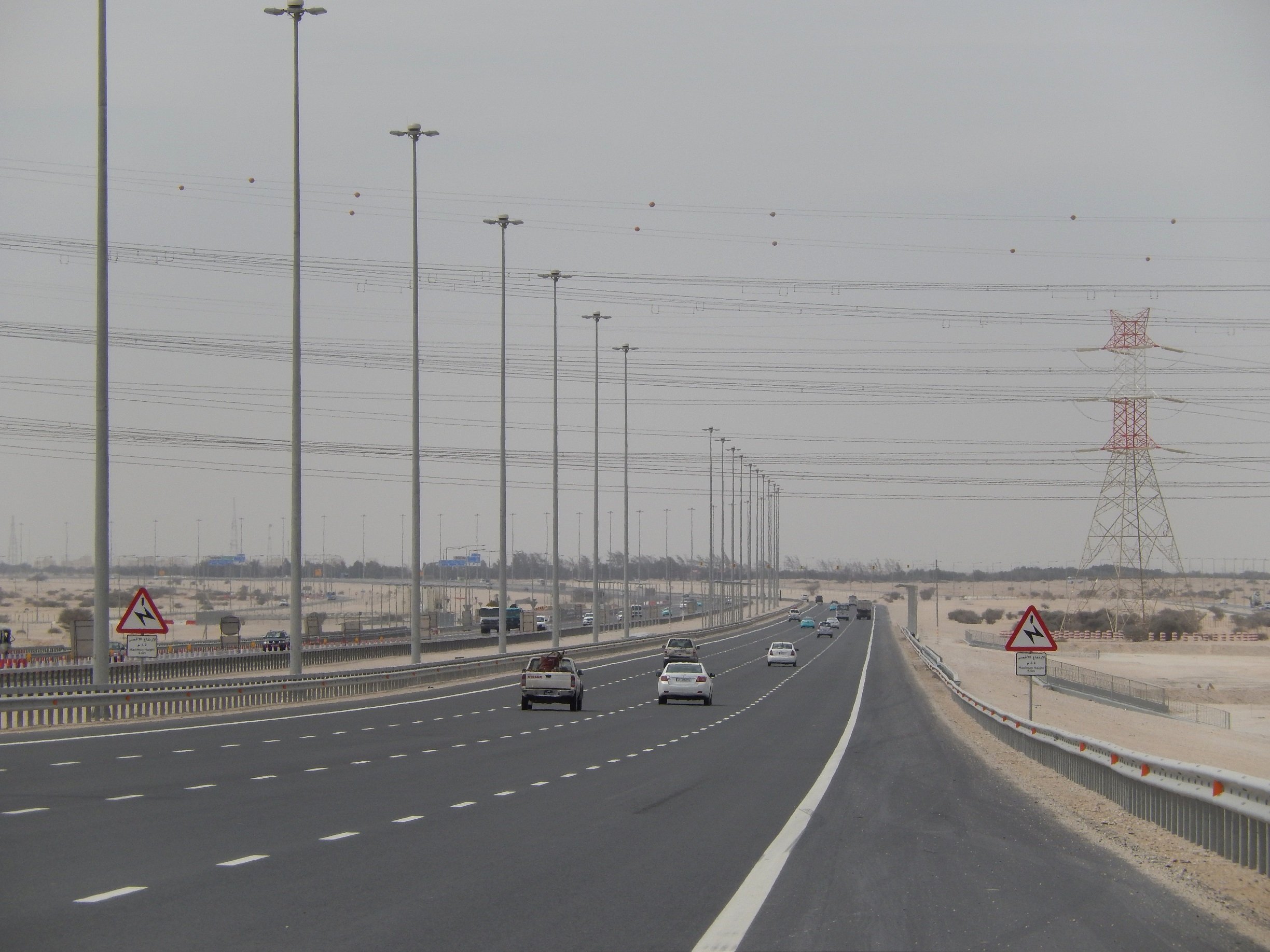
Highway Q3 (from Doha to Dukhan)

With a fast-expanding population and substantial economic growth over the past decade, a reliable and extensive transportation network is becoming increasingly necessary within Qatar. So far the government, the primary transport developer, has done well in terms of keeping up with demand for new transportation options. In 2008 the Public Works Authority (Ashghal), one of the bodies that oversees infrastructure development, underwent a major reorganisation in order to streamline and modernise the authority in preparation for major project expansions across all segments in the near future. Ashghal works in tandem with the Urban Planning and Development Authority (UPDA), the body that designed the transportation master plan, instituted in March 2006 and running to 2025.

As driving is the primary mode of transport in Qatar, the road network is a major focus of the plan. Project highlights in this segment include the multibillion-dollar Doha Expressway and the Qatar Bahrain Causeway, which will connect Qatar to Bahrain and Saudi Arabia and is considered a milestone in regional interconnectivity. Mass-transit options, such as a Doha metro, light-rail system and more extensive bus networks, are also under development to ease road congestion. In addition, the railway system is being significantly expanded and could eventually form an integral part of a GCC-wide network linking all of the six member states. The airport, too, is expanding capacity to keep up with rising visitor numbers. The New Doha International Airport is one of the largest projects in Qatar today and will boast a capacity of 50m passengers upon completion in 2015. Finally, port infrastructure is seen as an integral part of Qatar's economic development as it focuses on LNG and industrial exports. The port at Mesaieed is undergoing expansion. While the 2008 financial crisis may present challenges to infrastructure development, once all projects are completed Qatar will have one of the most advanced and modern transport infrastructures in the region.

== Water supply and sanitation sector ==
The water network in Qatar has been expanded extensively in recent years, the growth of urban areas; industry and agriculture has led to the increase in the length of the water network to 3,622 kilometres (2,251 mi) and expansion in the number of storage reservoirs to 23 with a total capacity of 1,180,000 m^{3} (259 million imperial gallons) of potable water a day.

== Employment ==
Qatar pursues a vigorous program of "Qatarization", under which all joint venture industries and government departments strive to move Qatari nationals into positions of greater authority. Growing numbers of foreign-educated Qataris, including many educated in the U.S., are returning home to assume key positions formerly occupied by expatriates. In order to control the influx of expatriate workers, Qatar has tightened the administration of its foreign manpower programs over the past several years. Security is the principal basis for Qatar's strict entry and immigration rules and regulations.

== Macro-economic statistics ==
Exports of Qatar by product category (2019) Chemical products Transportation Machines Mineral products Plastics and rubbers Metals Foodstuffs Precious metals Textiles Instruments Animal products Vegetable products Paper goods Footwear and headwear Miscellaneous Stone and glass Wood products Animal and vegetable bi-products Animal hides Arts and antiques Weapons

Qatar is now among the richest countries in the world, on a per person basis. Current GDP per capita registered a world record-breaking peak growth of 1,156% in the 70s. This became quickly unsustainable due to the 1980s oil glut, and Qatar's current GDP per capita contracted 53% in the 80s. But rising global oil demand helped current GDP per capita to expand 94% in the 90s. Despite efforts to promote the non-hydrocarbon sectors and diversify the economy from hydrocarbons to knowledge-based sectors, the oil and gas sector has consistently contributed to at least 80 percent of the government of Qatar’s total revenues since 2014, as well as 90 percent of Qatar’s total exports. In 2020 GDP PPP ~260 billion dollars.

This table is of Qatar's gross domestic product at market prices as estimated by the International Monetary Fund with figures in millions of Qatari Rials.

Year	Gross Domestic Product	US Dollar Exchange	Inflation Index (2000=100)	Per Capita Income (as % of USA)
1980	28,631	3.65 Qatari Riyals	53	266.18
1985	22,829	3.63 Qatari Riyals	64	104.82
1990	26,792	3.64 Qatari Riyals	77	67.85
1995	29,622	3.63 Qatari Riyals	85	55.75
2000	64,646	3.63 Qatari Riyals	100	86.03
2005	137,784	3.64 Qatari Riyals	115	127.05

For purchasing power parity comparisons only, the US Dollar is exchanged at 3.67 Qatari Riyals. Mean wages were $59.99 per man-hour in 2009.

In February 2012, the International Bank of Qatar reported that GDP grew by 19.9% in 2011, but estimated that 2012 growth would slow to 9.8%

According to the International Monetary Fund, Qatar's economic performance improved in 2018 despite the economic embargo. The GDP growth is expected to increase to 2.6% in 2019 from 2.2% in 2018.

The following table shows the main economic indicators in 1980–2024. Inflation below 2% is in green.

Year	GDP (in Bil. US$ PPP)	GDP per capita (in US$ PPP)	GDP (in Bil. US$ nominal)	GDP growth (real)	Inflation rate (in Percent)	Government debt (in % of GDP)
1980	13.7	56,086	6.7	▼−1.0%	▲6.8%	n/a
1981	▲14.4	▼54,463	▲7.4	▼−3.9%	▲8.5%	n/a
1982	▼14.1	▼49,289	▼6.5	▼−8.2%	▲5.7%	n/a
1983	▼13.8	▼45,257	▼5.5	▼−5.3%	▲2.7%	n/a
1984	▲16.6	▲50,989	▲5.7	▲16.0%	▲1.1%	n/a
1985	▼14.9	▼43,310	▼5.3	▼−13.0%	▲1.1%	n/a
1986	▲15.8	▲43,626	▼4.2	▲3.7%	▲1.9%	n/a
1987	▲16.3	▼43,280	▲4.4	▲0.9%	▲4.5%	n/a
1988	▲17.7	▲45,085	▼4.3	▲4.7%	▲4.8%	n/a
1989	▲19.4	▲47,486	▲4.5	▲5.3%	▲3.3%	n/a
1990	▼17.1	▼35,983	▲6.3	▼−14.6%	▲3.0%	12.6%
1991	▲17.5	▼35,983	▼5.6	▼−1.5%	▲4.5%	▲21.8%
1992	▲19.7	▲40,268	▲6.4	▲10.4%	▲2.9%	▼19.9%
1993	▲20.0	▲40,657	▼5.8	▼−0.9%	▼-0.7%	▲46.3%
1994	▲20.8	▲42,060	▲5.9	▲1.9%	▲1.4%	▲54.8%
1995	▲21.3	▲42,576	▲6.9	▲0.4%	▲3.0%	▼50.2%
1996	▲22.6	▲44,191	▲7.8	▲4.2%	▲7.0%	▲57.8%
1997	▲29.4	▲55,580	▲10.0	▲27.7%	▲2.7%	▼54.4%
1998	▲32.8	▲59,617	▼8.5	▲10.3%	▲2.9%	▲76.6%
1999	▲34.5	▲60,349	▲11.3	▲3.8%	▲2.2%	▲81.8%
2000	▲37.8	▲63,609	▲18.1	▲6.9%	▲1.6%	▼51.6%
2001	▲40.4	▲65,955	▼17.5	▲4.5%	▲1.7%	▲59.2%
2002	▲43.8	▲69,545	▲19.3	▲6.9%	▲0.2%	▼47.7%
2003	▲46.4	▲70,339	▲23.7	▲4.0%	▲2.3%	▼38.8%
2004	▲56.9	▲78,927	▲30.7	▲19.2%	▲6.8%	▼30.1%
2005	▲63.2	▼76,976	▲44.6	▲7.8%	▲9.0%	▼19.1%
2006	▲83.5	▲86,252	▲58.6	▲28.1%	▲11.7%	▼13.9%
2007	▲101.3	▲87,909	▲76.0	▲18.2%	▲13.7%	▼9.4%
2008	▲121.3	▼78,088	▲112.6	▲17.5%	▲15.1%	▲11.4%
2009	▲138.0	▲84,231	▼88.2	▲13.1%	▼−4.9%	▲36.0%
2010	▲164.5	▲95,908	▲119.7	▲17.7%	▼−2.4%	▼30.4%
2011	▲186.9	▲107,842	▲167.8	▲11.3%	▲2.0%	▲33.5%
2012	▲199.3	▲108,758	▲186.8	▲4.7%	▲1.8%	▼32.1%
2013	▲214.0	▼106,802	▲198.7	▲5.6%	▲3.1%	▼30.9%
2014	▲229.3	▼103,485	▲206.2	▲5.3%	▲4.2%	▼24.9%
2015	▲242.5	▼99,464	▼161.7	▲4.8%	▲0.9%	▲35.5%
2016	▲252.3	▼96,376	▼151.7	▲3.1%	▲2.7%	▲46.7%
2017	▲252.9	▼92,839	▲161.1	▼−1.5%	▲0.6%	▲51.6%
2018	▲284.0	▲102,880	▲183.3	▲1.2%	▲0.1%	▲52.2%
2019	▼283.7	▼101,337	▼176.4	▲0.7%	▼−0.9%	▲62.1%
2020	▼229.5	▼81,003	▼144.4	▼−3.6%	▼−2.5%	▲72.6%
2021	▲292.7	▲106,491	▲179.7	▲1.6%	▲2.3%	▼58.4%
2022	▲326.6	▲111,396	▲235.7	▲4.2%	▲5.0%	▼42.6%
2023	▲342.4	▲111,789	▼213.0	▲1.2%	▲3.1%	▲43.3%
2024	▲356.0	▲115,075	▲221.4	▲1.5%	▲1.0%	▼41.2%

== See also ==
- List of companies of Qatar
- Corruption in Qatar
- Doha Forum
- General Secretariat for Development Planning
- Mayhoola for Investments
- Ministry of Finance (Qatar)
- Qatar Central Bank
- Qatar Chamber of Commerce and Industry
- Qatar Investment Authority
- Trade unions in Qatar
- Economy of the Middle East
