= Healthcare in Qatar =

Healthcare in Qatar is regulated by the Ministry of Public Health. Healthcare practitioners are regulated by the Department of Healthcare Professions (DHP). The healthcare system can be divided into the public (governmental) sector, and the private sector. Public healthcare is provided by Primary Health Care Corporation (PHCC) for primary healthcare, and Hamad Medical Corporation (HMC) which operate secondary and tertiary healthcare centers, among other services. Specialized centers such as Sidra Medicine and Aspetar are outside the scope of HMC.

Healthcare standards in Qatar are generally high. Approximately 8.4% of GDP goes to health related expenditures. Qatar's healthcare spending per capita is among the highest in the Middle East, with $4.7 billion being invested in healthcare in 2014. This was a $2.1 billion increase from 2010.

In the public sector, the health expenditures of Qatari citizens are covered by the state, in accordance with Article 23 of the Qatari constitution. Expatriates must either receive health insurance from their employers, or in the case of the self-employed, purchase insurance.

== History and development ==
=== Traditional medicine ===
Before oil was discovered, healthcare consisted of traditional medicine: barbers performed circumcisions and other minor procedures, and herbalists dispensed natural remedies. Cauterization was a prominent practice in folk medicine. Before embarking on a pearl diving trip, a sailor would often be cauterized to prevent ear problems from developing. The practice was also used to cure a number of illnesses. Abdulaziz bin Ahmed Al Thani, a state official during the 1930s and member of the ruling family of Qatar, was noted for his curing of illnesses by using cauterization. Cupping therapy was also a prominent feature of folk medicine. It was commonly used in conjunction with herbal therapy, a form of treatment which utilized traditional herbs in Islamic medicine. Bitter aloe was the most prized herb. Other natural remedies used by Qataris include incense, thyme and saffron. Locusts were also venerated for their purported healing abilities in local nomadic culture and were considered a delicacy because of their nutritious properties, leading to their additional use as livestock feed. Of all the forms of folk medicine, herbal therapy was the most popular. Traditional practices were seldom documented, instead being passed down through oral methods.

=== First modern hospital and Al Rumailah Hospital ===
In 1943, Sheikh Abdullah bin Jassim opted to establish the country's first hospital in order to provide treatment for his son, Hamad bin Abdullah. Prior to this, Qatari residents had to travel abroad in order to receive treatment for more severe illnesses, most typically going to the American Mission hospitals in Kuwait, Oman, or Bahrain, or to Iran. Because of Abdullah bin Jassim's lack of resources, he sought help from the British political resident in Qatar. The representative rejected his proposal, and he turned to the American Mission, who agreed to help fund and construct a hospital. The hospital opened in 1947 with a 12-bed capacity and was staffed by a single doctor from the American Mission, who was rotated on a recurrent basis. By 1948, it was visited by approximately 75 out-patients per day. The American Mission ceased sending staff members to the hospital in the late 1940s or early 1950s, and as a result, the government assumed full responsibility for its operation.

Al Rumailah Hospital, the first government hospital in the country, was founded in 1957. Plans for its establishment were drawn up in the early 1950s and the patent for its design was awarded by the Royal Institute of British Architects to two British architects in 1952. The hospital subsequently had multiple renovations, and is still open.

=== Hamad Medical Corporation ===
Development in healthcare was expedited accelerated after the accession in 1972 of Khalifa bin Hamad, who dramatically altered the allocation of oil revenues. This included transferring the ruler's 25 percent of oil revenues to the state budget. However, the health budget soon suffered because of the downturns in oil revenues. In 1986, for example, there were cuts of 10 percent in clinic staff.

Hamad Medical Corporation was established as a non-profit healthcare provider by Aimi Decree No. 35 in 1979 . This serves as a point of formalization of the healthcare system and the public health sector. It was initially aimed to inherit the public hospitals (then mainly Hamad General Hospital, Al Rumailah Hospital, and Women's Hospital). However, it later encompassed further hospitals, and most of the public secondary and tertiary care in the country.

=== Recent developments and current goals ===
In 2012, the country announced its plans to introduce a universal health care system. The universal health care program has five stages, to be fully implemented by 2015. In the 2014 GCC Healthcare Report released by Alpen International, Qatar's healthcare sector was ranked as the fastest growing in the GCC.

The Supreme Council of Health, which oversees the health sector, announced the "Qatar Health Facilities Master Plan" (QHFMP) program in 2014. As part of the program, as many as 48 healthcare infrastructure projects are set to be developed in Qatar by 2020. It is intended to foster competition between state and private health providers. A Qatar Medical Research Council has been established. The Sidra Medical and Research Center, planned to open in 2017 is to translate research into practical treatments.

Currently, health coverage is nationwide. Qatar has made developing a world class public health system one of its key goals through its National Vision 2030 initiative. About 10% of the healthcare workforce are Qataris.

== Health Insurance ==
=== Seha ===
The government has established the National Health Insurance Company which manages and operates Seha, the national health insurance scheme. From July 2013 it has covered Qatari females aged 12 and above for gynaecology, obstetrics, maternity and related women’s health conditions. From 30 April 2014, it provides comprehensive insurance coverage to Qatari nationals for basic health care needs, which includes almost all medical, dental and optical treatment except cosmetic surgery, alternative medicine and over-the-counter drugs.

It was intended to extend the scheme to foreign workers from 2016. But, this was dropped in late 2015 due to it becoming too expensive.

=== Mandatory Health Insurance Scheme ===
Aside from transit visitors, temporary entry travelers, and visa on arrival visitors for the first 30 days, all non-Qataris are mandated to acquire insurance coverage, either from national insurance companies or approved international companies. The mandatory health insurance scheme was implemented on the first of February 2023.

== Infrastructure ==
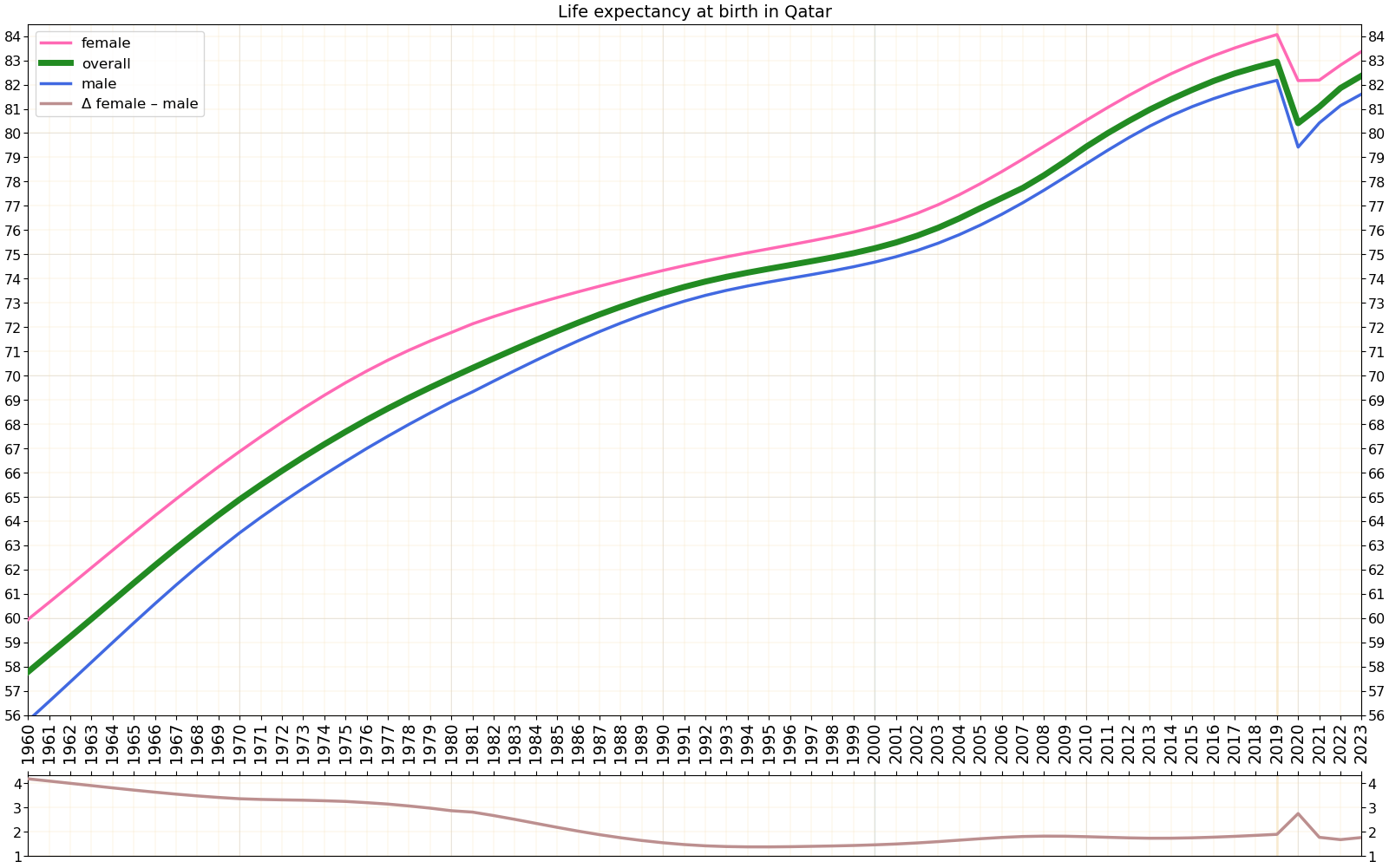
Life expectancy development in Qatar by gender

In 2010, spending on healthcare accounted for 2.2% of the country's GDP; the highest in the Middle East. In 2006, there were 23.12 physicians and 61.81 nurses per 10,000 inhabitants. The life expectancy at birth was 82.08 years in 2014, or 83.27 years for males and 77.95 years for females, rendering it the highest life expectancy in the Middle East. Qatar has a low infant mortality rate of 7 in 100,000.

In 2006, there were a total of 25 beds per 10,000 people, and 27.6 doctors and 73.8 nurses per 10,000 people. In 2011, the number of beds decreased to 12 per 10,000 people, whereas the number of doctors increased to 28 per 10,000 people. While the country has one of the lowest proportions of hospital beds in the region, the availability of physicians is the highest in the GCC.

=== Hamad Medical Corporation ===
Hamad Medical Corporation is the premier healthcare provider in the country. It runs a network of 15 hospitals, an ambulance service and a home healthcare service, all of which are accredited by the Joint Commission. Hamad Medical City is a district in Doha solely dedicated to support HMC infrastructure. There are about 500,000 visits to the emergency room each year.

In 2019, HMC operated a approximately a total of 2,500 beds, which equates to approximately 80% of the in-patient bed capacity in Qatar. The rest of the bed capacity is under the private sector.

HMC growth in service
Measure	2011	2023/24
Outpatient visits	1.4 million	3.3 million
Emergency visits	1.1 million	1.44 million
Surgeries	32,000	58,000
In-patient bed capacity	1,500 beds	3,000 beds

=== Ambulance services ===
The Hamad Medical Corporation Ambulance Service (HMCAS) and the Qatar Red Crescent Emergency Medical Services are the two largest Ambulance services in the country, respectively. The HMC Ambulance Service receives up to 430,000 calls annually. It operates as a hub and spoke model, to ensure minimum response time. The ambulance services are supplemented by a LifeFlight service.

=== Hospitals ===
Qatar had four public and five private hospitals as of 2010. At least eight public hospitals were either opened or renovated in the following 10 years. The main private hospitals in the country are Al Ahli Hospital, Doha Clinic Hospital, Al Emadi Hospital, and The American Hospital.

Sidra Medical and Research Center was set to be the first center of its kind in the Middle East region during its establishment. Endowed with $7.9 billion by Qatar Foundation, it is a large-scale project designed with state-of-the-art healthcare and education facilities intended to provide health services to the whole GCC region. It currently serves as the only pediatric quaternary care hospital in the country.

Souq Waqif Falcon Hospital, located in Doha's old city, is entirely dedicated to treat falcons, the national bird of Qatar. The hospital, which has been subsidized by Sheikh Tamim bin Hamad Al Thani, is set over multiple floors and over 150 falcons are treated each day.

== Medical education ==
Considerable focus was placed to establish an infrastructure for medical education in Qatar from 2008 onwards. This comes as part of Qatar National Vision 2030.

=== Physicianship ===
Weill Cornell Medicine - Qatar and Qatar University College of Medicine are the only medical schools in the State of Qatar. Weill Cornell Medicine - Qatar was established in 2001. Qatar University graduated its first batch in 2021.

Both colleges are affiliated with HMC, PHCC, Sidra Medicine, and other healthcare providers for clinical training. The Medical School at Qatar University is to open in 2015. The Weill Cornell Medical College in Qatar has been training clinicians since 2002.

HMC and Sidra Medicine are the only entities that offer residency programs. Most residency programs and fellowship programs are accredited by the American Council for Graduate Medical Education - International (ACGME-I), which is the international counterpart of the ACGME. In the Gulf, Qatar is the largest hub for post-graduate medical education.

=== Dentistry ===
The College of Dental Medicine in Qatar University serves as the only dental school in the country.

=== Nursing ===
The University of Calgary in Qatar (UCQ) was established in 2006. It later closed in August 2025. The closure came in synchrony with the then recent establishment of The College of Nursing in Qatar University, established in 2022.

=== Allied Health Professionals ===
The College of Health Sciences in Qatar University was established in 2017.

=== Higher medical education and inter-professional education ===
In June 2009, in order to align the country's healthcare professionals, the Qatar Interprofessional Health Council was formed. This led to the implementation of Interprofessional Education (IPE) into existing healthcare programs at various schools.

Itqan Clinical Simulation and Innovation Center is the largest healthcare simulation center in Qatar. It is accredited by the Society for Simulation in Healthcare.

== Administration ==
Created in 2005, the Supreme Council of Health (SCH) is responsible for regulating Qatar's healthcare system. In December 2015, the council published the first patients' right charter in the country.

Healthcare in Qatar continues to grow which has led to more spending. The number of healthcare workers has reached over 11,000. As the development of the healthcare system in Qatar grows, the administration is also undergoing improvements to offer a more global standard of patient care. Incorporating Interprofessional Education (IPE) the administrative members learn to be more collaborative with each other. After IPE, the overall care for the patient was improved and the hospital personnel became more efficient. Existing healthcare professionals in Qatar will learn and implement IPE over time; new healthcare professionals will learn IPE before becoming licensed.

Cultural norms in Qatar make it difficult for women to become healthcare workers. Men in Qatar, husbands and fathers, are more reluctant of the women in their lives to pursue nursing. However, those who enter the nursing field, nearly 93% are very satisfied with their career choice. Although satisfied, the burnout rate is 12.6% with higher female burnouts than male.

== See also ==
- Health in Qatar
- List of hospitals in Qatar
