= Hanan Mohamed al-Kuwari =

Qatari healthcare management professional

- حنان محمد الكواري

Minister of Public Health
- In office January 2016 – 12 November 2024
- Monarch: Tamim bin Hamad Al Thani
- Prime Minister: Abdullah bin Nasser bin Khalifa Al Thani; Khalid bin Khalifa bin Abdul Aziz Al Thani; Mohammed bin Abdulrahman bin Jassim Al Thani
- Preceded by: Abdullah bin Khalid Al Qahtani
- Succeeded by: Mansoor bin Ebrahim bin Saad Al Mahmoud

Personal details
- Education: Brunel University (PhD)

Hanan Mohamed al-Kuwari is a Qatari healthcare management professional. In 2015 she appeared at #20 in the CEO Middle East list of the 100 most powerful Arab women. She had served as Qatar Minister of Public Health from January 2016 until November 2024 and serves on multiple medical boards in Qatar and the United States.

== Early life, education and career ==
She studied at Brunel University in the United Kingdom, earning her PhD in healthcare management in 2002.

Al-Kuwari has worked for the WHO, Reuters and as a freelance health reporter. She entered the field of healthcare management in 1996 by joining the Women's Hospital of Hamad Medical Corporation (HMC).

Since 2007, she has maintained her position as a Managing Director of HMC.

Forbes ranked al-Kuwari 2nd among Middle East's "Top 50 Healthcare Leaders 2022" and 8th among the "100 most powerful businesswomen in the Arab world" 2023.

=== Current positions ===
Al-Kuwari currently holds the following positions:

- Chairperson of the Academic Health System International Advisory Board
- Chairperson of the Hamad Healthcare Quality Institute International Advisory Board
- Co-chairperson of the Joint Advisory Board of Weill Cornell Medicine - Qatar
- Member of the Board of Regents
- Governor on the Board of Governors for Sidra Medicine
- Vice Chair for the Board of the Qatar Precision Medicine Institute
- Member of Board of Directors of Qatar Foundation for Social Work
- Member of Qatar Foundation’s Qatar Research, Development and Innovation Council

As the Minister of Qatar's Public health, al-Kuwari was responsible for the functions of the Ministry of Health. This included overseeing all programs in the public and private sectors. She worked to ensure the efficiency of the service providers and public health service programs, and the growth of Qatar's National Health and Public Health Strategies. Recently, the Joint Committee Meeting on 'Health in All Policies' was participated in by eleven ministries and government entities. Al-Kuwari presided over the meeting, which was held at the Ministry of Public Health headquarters. During this meeting, she encouraged joint participation in order to further the objectives laid out by Qatar's Second National Development Strategy 2018-2022.

In October 2018 she was elected as an international member of the National Academy of Medicine (NAM) of the United States.
