= Food safety in Qatar =

Food safety is the process of ensuring safe food consumption in the country and preventing diseases outbreaks by approving laws that ensure safety and sanitation in food industries. In Qatar, Food safety is a major concern because unsafe food can result in foodborne diseases outbreaks and cause death due to the fact that contaminated food consumption can affect everyone with severe impacts on elderly, children, infants, people with chronic diseases such as diabetes, pregnant women, and people with a compromised immune system. Foodborne illnesses are a result of eating contaminated food with different types of pathogens.

== Food safety overview ==
Food safety is known as the consumption of wholesome food that does not pose a harmful impact on human health. Consuming unsafe food can result in the outbreak of foodborne diseases among people and most foodborne diseases result from improper food handling by the workers in the food industry because of poor knowledge about proper practices and personal hygiene.

Foodborne illnesses happen due to the consumption of hazardous food that is contaminated by toxic chemicals, physical matter, and microbial pathogens such as bacteria and causes food poisoning and diseases. The source of the contamination can come from raw food (meat, fish, and egg), contaminated hands, unclean equipment, untreated water, or pests. Foodborne diseases are affecting nearly all the population in developed and developing countries. According to WHO (2015), 30% of the world population is affected by foodborne diseases that can cause mild to severe illnesses or death. Moreover, Several studies linked the cause of foodborne diseases to the practices of food handlers.

== Food safety in Qatar ==
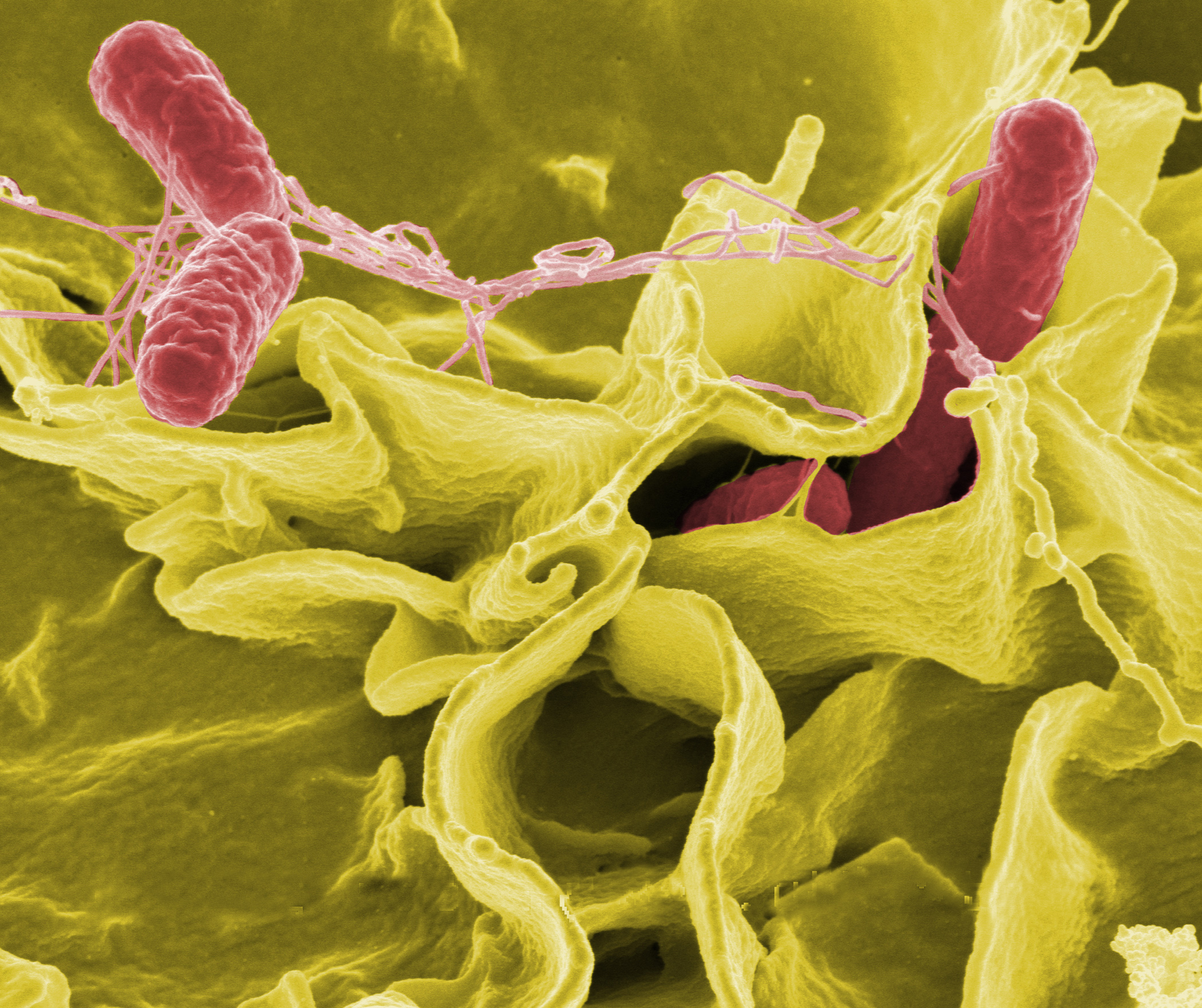
Salmonella

Qatar is an independent state in the Middle East located among the western coast of the Persian Gulf and is considered a peninsula. Qatar has a desert climate that is characterized by high temperature and humidity. In the summer, the temperature can reach 40 °C or more and in the winter, the temperature is approximately around 20 °C or less with infrequent rain.

Due to Qatar's hot weather and high humidity, food poisoning is the most common disease reported at hospitals during the summer because the bacteria that cause it requires a moist environment with warm temperatures to multiply and grow.

As a result of food poisoning, People reported suffering from symptoms such as nausea, vomiting, abdominal cramps, diarrhea, fever, bloody stool, and severe cases that experience shock and collapse. Additional testing demonstrated that the most common pathogens reported at the emergency of Hamad Hospital in Qatar are Campylobacter, Salmonella, norovirus, Escherichia coli, Shigella, and Listeria. These types of pathogens spread through contaminated food and water consumption and unpasteurized milk.

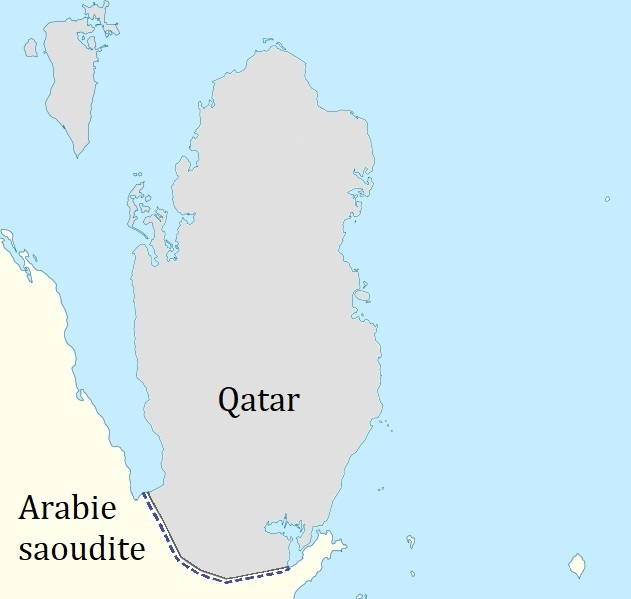
Qatar's Map

== Food safety awareness in Qatar ==
Food safety awareness is the main pillar in regulating food establishments and facilities by spreading public awareness which helps provide workers in food sectors with indicative information that demonstrates the correct methods and health conditions that must be followed during food usage in order to avoid the factors that lead to food poisoning and foodborne diseases. In Qatar, food safety practices are not taught in schools and the majority of students gain their knowledge about food safety from outside sources or follow the practices that their parents do. Furthermore, most of the programs that spread awareness about food focus on safe eating such as the impacts of healthy food and unhealthy food on the body or the type of food that contains more vitamins and minerals. However, there are some food safety awareness programs provided by the department of public awareness in the Ministry of municipality and environment. These programs target multiple groups in society such as workers in food establishments, school students, and housewives.

== Food safety departments and laws in Qatar ==
Food safety control plays a critical role in quality assurance and observance of standards for importing, producing, processing, preparing, and disposing of food products. Food safety control is particularly necessary given that approximately 90% of food in Qatar is imported and due to the increasing pressure on food inspection services and port authorities the ministry of public health and the ministry of municipality and environment work on continually regulating food safety, managing, and controlling the potential risk of foodborne disease outbreaks and promoting public awareness.

These departments work on achieving the following goals:

- Promoting public awareness of nutritional and health risks from consuming unsafe foods.
- Strengthening the capabilities of the food safety management system to provide services that conform to international best practices in all important functional areas, such as inspection services, laboratory services, risk analysis, and setting standards for oversight, supervision, and regulation.
- Creating an integrated food safety device whose work is in line with international best practice standards for food safety management throughout the food supply chain, "from farm to consumer".
- Creating an integrated risk-based inspection service that is in line with relevant international standards, such as ISO / IEC 17020: 2012 specifications for imported, home-made and exported food products, backed by modern electronic management systems, effective diagnostic services, and control and supervision systems.
- Promoting a culture of food safety among all parties involved in the food supply chain through the implementation of effective public-private partnership programs, aimed at enhancing awareness of the need to take responsibility for managing food risks.

The Food Safety Department plays an effective role in implementing the health policy in all food safety-related matters and carries out the powers entrusted to the Ministry of Public Health under Law No. 8 of 1990 regarding regulating the human food control. The department conducts food control and inspection, in places where food is being handled and food traders to ensure its safety and validity. It also prohibits handling any food that does not meet the specifications and requirements in cooperation with competent authorities. In addition, it responds to emergency cases related to food safety and validity in partnership with more than one entity, manages and operates laboratories to examine and analyze food samples.
