= Victor Dzau =

Chinese-American doctor and academic

Victor J. Dzau PBM
- 曹文凱
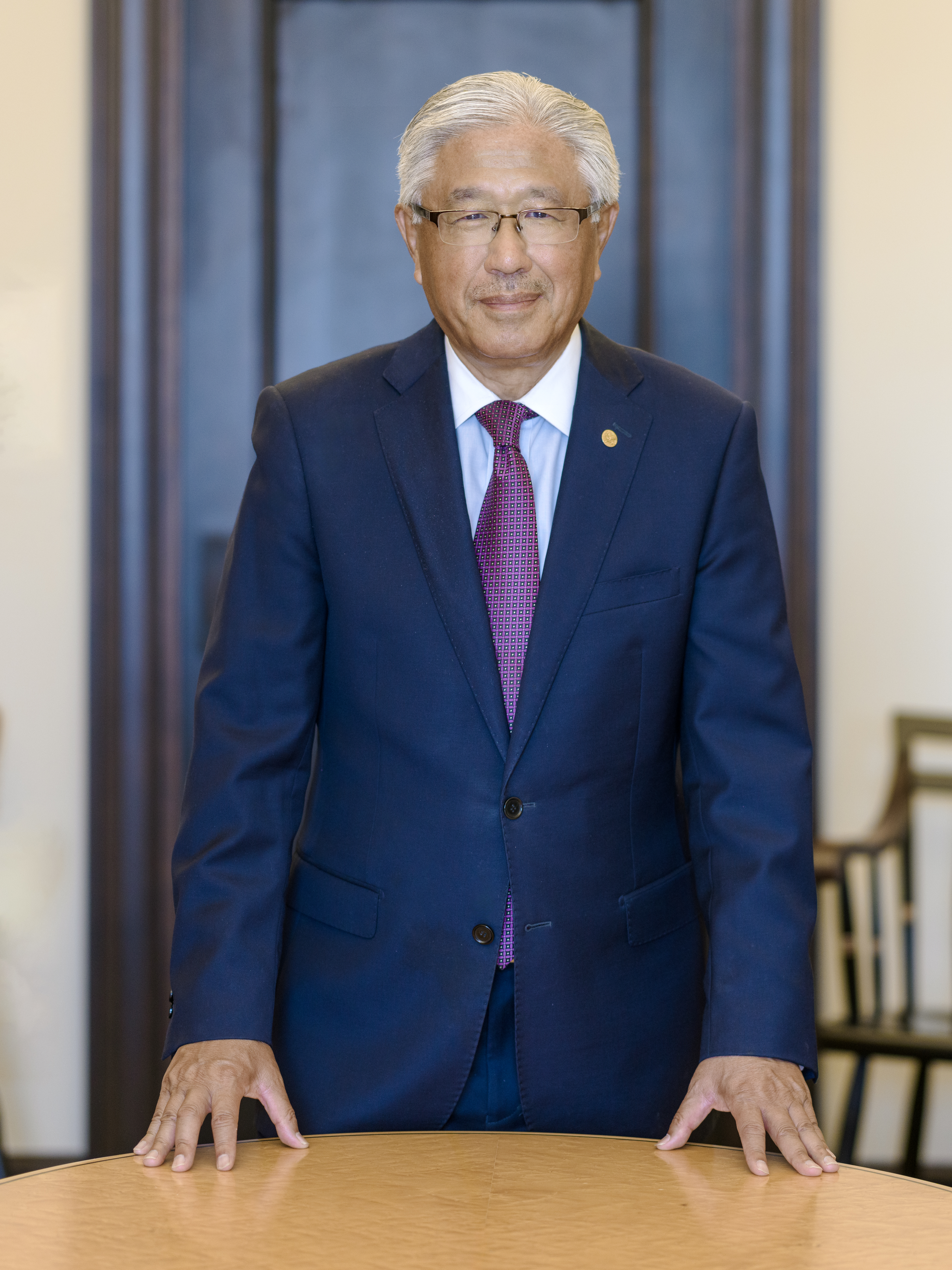
- Born: Victor Joseph Dzau; 23 October 1945 (age 81); Shanghai, China
- Education: McGill University (BSc, MD)
- Known for: Development of angiotensin-converting-enzyme (ACE) inhibitors Pioneer in gene therapy for vascular disease
- Spouse: Ruth Cooper
- Children: 2
- Scientific career
- Fields: Cardiovascular medicine and genetics
- Workplaces: Duke University

Victor Joseph Dzau PBM (Chinese: 曹文凱; pinyin: Cáo Wénkǎi; born 23 October 1945) is a Chinese-American physician and academic. He serves as the President of the United States National Academy of Medicine (formerly the Institute of Medicine) of the United States National Academy of Sciences and Vice Chair of its National Research Council. He is Chancellor Emeritus and James B. Duke Professor of Medicine at Duke University and former president and chief executive officer of Duke University Medical Center.

== Scientific career ==
Dzau received a Bachelor of Science degree in biology and an M.D. (in 1972) from McGill University in Montreal, Canada. He was the Hersey Professor of the Theory and Practice of Medicine at Harvard Medical School and served as Chairman of the Department of Medicine at Harvard Medical School's Brigham and Women's Hospital (1996–2004), as well as Chief of the Division of Cardiovascular Medicine and later Chairman of the Department of Medicine at Stanford University (1990–1996). He then became the Chancellor for Health Affairs at Duke University and president and chief executive officer of the Duke University Medical Center. Dzau is currently the James B. Duke Professor of Medicine at Duke University.

Dzau is known for his work on the renin–angiotensin system (RAS) and his investigations into gene therapy for vascular disease. His research laid the foundation for the development of ACE inhibitors, a class of drugs used to treat high blood pressure and congestive heart failure. Dzau was the first to introduce DNA decoy molecules to block transcription as gene therapy in humans. His research in cardiovascular regeneration led to the Paracrine Hypothesis of stem cell action and the therapeutic strategy of direct cardiac reprogramming. He was previously the Chairman of the National Institutes of Health Cardiovascular Disease Advisory Committee, and he served on the Advisory Committee to the Director of the National Institutes of Health.

He is a member of the National Academy of Medicine, American Academy of Arts and Sciences, European Academy of Sciences and Arts, Academia Sinica, Chinese Academy of Engineering, and Japan Academy.

On May 3, 2025, Dzau received an honorary Doctor of Science degree from the University of Michigan, having delivered a speech at the Rackham Graduate Exercises the previous day.

== Health care innovation ==
Dzau created Duke University's Institute of Health Innovation and Translational Medicine Institute. In 2011, he co-founded the non-governmental organization Innovations in Healthcare in partnership with the World Economic Forum (WEF) and McKinsey & Company. In 2016, he was named by Modern Healthcare as one of the 50 most influential physician executives.

Dzau has published and spoken extensively on reimagining the future of academic medicine and medical training. In 2010, he proposed an evolution from “bench to bedside” to a “bench to bedside to population” model, which would encompass the entirety of the discovery to care continuum. This model is an approach to closing the gaps in traditional medicine and increasing integration from research to care to population: first, minimizing the gap between scientific discovery and clinical translation (bench to bedside), and second, closing the gap between clinical best practices and community dissemination and adoption (bedside to population). In 2021, Dzau revised the model to reflect a “bench to bedside to population to society” approach. The updated version speaks to the current need for convergence of care delivery with public health, as well as the importance of data science, the significant contributions of social determinants of health, and the impact of health and social inequities.

== Leadership of the National Academy of Medicine ==
In July 2014, Dzau was appointed for a six-year term as President of the then Institute of Medicine (now the National Academy of Medicine). He was the first person of color and the first immigrant to lead any of the three Academies that make up the U.S. National Academies of Sciences, Engineering and Medicine. He oversaw the reconstitution in 2015 of the Institute of Medicine as the National Academy of Medicine, establishing a novel operational and programmatic infrastructure for the organization. In 2020, he was elected to a second six-year term by members of the National Academy of Medicine, becoming the organization's first president to be elected rather than appointed by the president of the National Academy of Sciences.

Dzau launched numerous programs and initiatives at the National Academy of Medicine, including:

- Human Genome Editing Initiative, an international effort to guide the development and application of novel gene editing technologies such as CRISPR-Cas9, in collaboration with the National Academy of Sciences, the Chinese Academy of Sciences, and the Royal Society.
- Committee on Emerging Science, Technology, and Innovation in Health and Medicine, which brings together experts in diverse fields to assess the landscape of emerging scientific advances and technologies in health and medicine and address the potential societal, ethical, legal, and workforce implications of such technologies, with the goal of developing a cross-sectoral governance framework.
- Action Collaborative on Clinician Well-Being & Resilience, a public-private partnership to mitigate burnout among health professionals and medical students. In 2022, the Action Collaborative produced a National Plan for Health Workforce Well-Being.
- Culture of Health Program, an effort to advance the evidence base around drivers of health inequities and strategies to advance health equity in the United States.
- Healthy Longevity Global Grand Challenge, a worldwide initiative to improve physical, mental, and social well-being for people as they age. In 2022, the initiative produced the Global Roadmap for Healthy Longevity report, which describes scalable strategies for world societies to benefit from the contributions of older people while avoiding predicted challenges of population aging. The initiative also includes a multiyear, international competition to accelerate breakthroughs in healthy longevity through a series of monetary awards and prizes. The competition involves partnerships from the United States, United Kingdom, European Union, Japan, Singapore, China, Hong Kong, Taiwan, Chile, and Canada and covers more than 50 countries and territories.
- Grand Challenge on Climate Change, Human Health, & Equity, an initiative to reverse the negative effects of climate change on health and social equity by activating the entire health community; communicating and educating the public; driving changes through research, innovation, and policy; and decarbonizing the health care sector. The program includes the Action Collaborative on Decarbonizing the US Health Sector, a public-private partnership of leaders from across the U.S. health system – including the federal government, industry, hospital systems, private payers, clinicians, and academia.
- Action Collaborative on Countering Substance Use and Opioid Crises, a public-private partnership to accelerate solutions to addiction crises in the United States.
- Global Health Risk Framework for the Future, an effort to increase preparedness for pandemic disease outbreaks following the 2013–2016 Ebola outbreak in Guinea.
- Vital Directions for Health and Health Care, a collection of expert guidance to inform incoming U.S. presidential administrations about health policy priorities.

Focus on health equity and social issues

Under Dzau's tenure as president, the National Academy of Medicine added “accelerating health equity” to its mission statement. Dzau secured a $10 million endowment from the Robert Wood Johnson Foundation to enable the Academy to advance the science of equity and engage with communities.

In 2022, Dzau launched a Task Force on Preventing Firearm-Related Injuries and Deaths, stating that "firearm violence is a public health crisis. Our inaction has allowed it to spread through this nation like a deadly virus. We must find the courage — and the creativity — to stop it." Dzau is the author of op-eds and articles encouraging further research into strategies for preventing firearm injuries and deaths.

Following the Dobbs v. Jackson Women’s Health Organization decision, Dzau made a statement alongside National Academy of Sciences president Marcia McNutt asserting that "the U.S. Supreme Court’s ruling to overturn Roe v. Wade will likely make it even more difficult for women to access high-quality health care in this country. The risks are especially acute for women of color, women from low-income backgrounds, and women living in rural areas." Following this statement, the National Academies of Sciences, Engineering, and Medicine established a Standing Committee on Reproductive Health, Equity, and Society.

== Global health leadership ==
Dzau created Duke University's Institute of Global Health and the Duke NUS Graduate Medical School in Singapore. He also founded the Division of Global Health Equity at Harvard Brigham and Women’s Hospital and chairs the International Advisory Board of McGill University's School of Population and Global Health. Dzau served on the Board of Health Governors for the World Economic Forum and chaired its Global Futures Council on Healthy Longevity and Human Enhancement. Dzau is co-chair of the Healthy Brains Global Initiative, which aims to improve the lives of people living with mental and neurological health conditions worldwide.

Dzau serves on the board of the Imperial College Health Partners and the Health and Biomedical Sciences International Advisory Council of Singapore. He also chairs scientific advisory committees for the Qatar Precision Health Institute and the Qatar Genome Programme, the Scientific Boards of the Peter Munk Cardiac Center of University of Toronto, and the Institute of Cardiovascular and Medical Sciences of University of Glasgow. He is a member of the board of directors of the Institute of Health Evaluation and Metrics and served on the board of the Coalition for Epidemic Preparedness Innovations.

In 2019, Dzau received Singapore's Honorary Citizen Award, "the highest form of recognition bestowed by the Singapore Government for outstanding contributions by individuals to the country’s growth and development."

Three Global Health Lectureships have been established in Dzau's name:

- The Victor Dzau and Ruth Cooper-Dzau Distinguished Lectures in Global and Population Health at McGill University
- The Victor Dzau Lecture in Global Health Equity at Brigham and Women's Hospital (Harvard University)
- The Victor J. Dzau Distinguished Lecture in Global Health at Duke University

=== Global leadership during the COVID-19 pandemic ===
Dzau was outspoken in calling for ongoing U.S. support for the World Health Organization during the COVID-19 pandemic after funding was withdrawn by the Trump administration in 2020. In 2021, he delivered a letter to the Biden administration urging allocation of a portion of the U.S. supply of COVID-19 vaccines for developing nations, stating, "the success of global SARS-CoV-2 vaccination will depend entirely on the leadership and investment of wealthy nations. The United States should be leading this charge."

Dzau helped to initiate the Coronavirus Global Response Pledging Conference hosted by the European Commission on 4 May 2020, which set the goal of raising €7.5 billion to develop diagnostics, treatments, and a vaccine. He addressed world leaders at the event, saying "This is about solidarity – we cannot let the poorest and most affected countries struggle alone. Infectious disease outbreaks like COVID-19 are among the most complex challenges we face as a global society. We need to work together to accelerate the development of vaccines and treatments and ensure that they will be available to everyone.”

Dzau is a member of the Global Preparedness Monitoring Board co-convened by the World Health Organization (WHO) and the World Bank. He serves as a principal of the Access to COVID-19 Tools Accelerator, which includes COVAX, the global collaboration for accelerating the development, manufacture, and equitable distribution of COVID-19 vaccines. He co-chaired the G20 Scientific Expert Panel on Global Health Security. He helped to develop the Science and Technology Expert Group of the International Pandemic Preparedness Secretariat, and is engaged with the 100 Day Mission, "an international effort to ensure that safe, effective vaccines, diagnostics, and therapeutics are available within 100 days of the onset of future pandemic threats." He co-chairs the World Economic Forum's Regionalized Vaccine Manufacturing Collaborative to develop distributed regional manufacturing capacity. Dzau was appointed to the G7 Health Task Force under the Japan Presidency in 2023.

== Personal life ==
Dzau was born in Shanghai, Republic of China. His father owned a chemical manufacturing company. He and his family fled to Hong Kong to escape from the Chinese Civil War.

Dzau's wife, Ruth Cooper-Dzau, is the president of The Second Step, a nonprofit charitable organization that provides housing and transnational programs for domestic violence victims. They have two daughters, Jacqueline and Merissa. Dzau is on the honor roll of the Jewish Federation of Durham Chapel Hill and has been a speaker at the Federation's Ignite talks.

== Honors and awards ==
- Eighteen honorary doctorate degrees
- Distinguished Scientist of the American Heart Association (2004)
- Max Delbrück Medal, Berlin, Germany (2004)
- Ellis Island Medal of Honor (2005)
- Henry Freisen International Prize (2012)
- Singapore Public Service Medal (2014)
- Honorary Citizen Award (Singapore) (2019)
- Gustav Nylin Medal from the Swedish Royal College of Medicine
- Poulzer Prize from the European Academy of Sciences and Arts
- Order of the Rising Sun from the Government of Japan (2025)
