= Weill Cornell Medicine - Qatar =

Branch of Weill Cornell Medicine in Doha, Qatar

Weill Cornell Medicine-Qatar
- Logo of Weill Cornell Medicine - Qatar
- Type: Private, nonprofit medical school
- Established: 2001; 25 years ago
- Parent institution: Cornell University
- Affiliations: Weill Cornell Medicine; Hamad Medical Corporation; Qatar Foundation
- Endowment: Parent Institution, US$10 Billion
- Dean: Javaid I. Sheikh, M.D.
- Faculty: 77 full-time, 690 affiliated
- Students: 322
- Location: Education City, Doha, Al Rayyan, Qatar; 25.3180°N 51.4389°E
- Campus: Education City
- Website: qatar-weill.cornell.edu

Weill Cornell Medicine-Qatar (WCM-Q) is a branch of Cornell University's Weill Cornell Medicine, established on April 9, 2001, following an agreement between Cornell University and the Qatar Foundation for Education, Science and Community Development (Qatar Foundation). It is located in Education City, Qatar, near Doha, the capital of Qatar.

WCM-Q offers undergraduate and graduate-entry medical programmes leading to a Doctor of Medicine degree awarded by Cornell University.

== History ==
WCM-Q was established in 2001 as part of Education City, Qatar Foundation's development in Al Rayyan for educational and research institutions. Before WCM-Q opened, Qatar had no medical schools, and Qatari citizens wishing to study medicine were generally sponsored to study abroad. WCM-Q became the country's first medical school.

Under an agreement between Cornell University and Qatar Foundation, Cornell retained control over key academic matters including admissions, curriculum, and the selection of academic staff, while Qatar Foundation funded the costs associated with establishing and operating the campus, including buildings, faculty salaries, and management fees. The WCM-Q programme was established with the same admission standards and curriculum as Weill Cornell Medical College in New York. More broadly, institutions participating in Education City's branch-campus model were expected to maintain academic equivalence with their home campuses in areas including curriculum, admissions, grading, faculty recruitment, and academic governance.

The college's operating budget was reported to average approximately US$68 million annually over an eleven-year period. An additional initial payment, estimated at between US$10 million and US$50 million, was reportedly made to cover costs in New York associated with the operation of the Qatar campus.

WCM-Q initially operated from temporary facilities in Education City while its permanent campus was being developed. Construction was scheduled to begin in January 2002 with completion expected in summer 2003. The school's pre-medical program opened in fall 2002, and WCM-Q was reportedly the first coeducational institution of higher education in Qatar. The college moved to its permanent Education City building in summer 2003.

The medical programme accepted its first intake of 16 students in September 2004. In the same year, plans were reported for a teaching hospital in Education City that would initially focus on women's health and paediatrics and was intended to serve as WCM-Q's primary teaching hospital. In October 2004, Weill Cornell Medical College, NewYork-Presbyterian Hospital, and Hamad Medical Corporation signed an affiliation agreement establishing Hamad Medical Corporation's hospitals and primary care facilities as clinical training sites for WCM-Q students.

In 2006, WCM-Q's first medical class began clinical clerkships at Hamad Medical Corporation, marking the beginning of hospital-based clinical training for its medical students.

In 2007, WCM-Q introduced its Foundation Programme to provide additional academic preparation for students entering university-level medical studies. The inaugural medical class graduated in May 2008.

Founding dean Daniel R. Alonso retired in January 2009. Deputy dean Javaid Sheikh succeeded him as interim dean and was appointed to the role of dean permanently in March 2010. WCM-Q entered into a clinical training agreement with Aspetar in 2009, providing opportunities for training in primary care and musculoskeletal medicine. The agreement was renewed and expanded in 2014.

Qatar Foundation and Weill Cornell signed an affiliation agreement concerning Sidra Medical and Research Centre (Sidra Medicine) in 2010. WCM-Q students subsequently undertook clinical training at Sidra Medicine.

In 2014, WCM-Q announced that its separate two-year pre-medical and four-year medical programmes would be combined into a single six-year medical programme. The unified programme took effect for students entering in September 2015, allowing those who met the required standards to progress from the pre-medical phase into the medical curriculum without submitting a separate application.

In 2015, the institution changed its name from Weill Cornell Medical College in Qatar to Weill Cornell Medicine-Qatar, in conjunction with the renaming of its parent institution in New York.

WCM-Q introduced a revised four-year medical curriculum in September 2016, based on that of its New York counterpart. The revision included earlier clinical training, close integration of scientific and clinical education, and a longitudinal research component. Also in 2016, The Washington Post reported that Weill Cornell Medicine-Qatar's estimated annual operating expenses for 2014 were $121.7 million, the highest among the six US branch campuses in Qatar's Education City.

WCM-Q graduated 52 physicians in 2026, its largest class to that date, including a record 22 Qatari nationals. To that date, WCM-Q had awarded 693 medical degrees to graduates since its first graduating class in 2008.

== Academics ==
Weill Cornell Medicine - Qatar in 2009

The school offers a six-year undergraduate-entry medical program, as well as a four-year graduate-entry program for students who have previously completed undergraduate degrees elsewhere. Students who complete the program are awarded the Doctor of Medicine (MD) degree by Cornell University.

A premedical Medical Ethics and Humanities course was first offered in 2003, with teaching adapted to the cultural and educational context of Qatar.

Following the introduction of clinical clerkships in 2006, WCM-Q developed medical interpreter training and cultural competence initiatives to address communication and care in Qatar's multilingual clinical environment. These developments included the establishment of a Centre for Cultural Competence in Health Care.

In 2017, WCM-Q reopened its expanded Clinical Skills and Simulation Lab, which incorporated additional simulation equipment and twice the previous number of clinical examination rooms.

WCM-Q has 33 clubs, sports teams, and student organizations, some of which compete against teams from other universities in Education City.

=== Clinical affiliations ===
Its clinical affiliates include the Hamad Medical Corporation's General Hospital and Women's Hospital and Sidra Medicine. Students undertake clinical clerkships in disciplines including internal medicine, surgery, paediatrics, obstetrics and gynaecology, psychiatry, and primary care.

Clinical training is also provided at primary care centres operated by the Primary Health Care Corporation and at Aspetar Orthopaedic and Sports Medicine Hospital.

=== Postgraduate training ===
Graduates can pursue postgraduate medical training in Qatar and abroad, including residency programmes at Hamad Medical Corporation, Sidra Medicine and hospitals in the United States.

=== Governance ===
WCM-Q's academic courses are overseen by Cornell University, while Qatar Foundation is responsible for oversight of the campus facilities. A joint advisory board comprising representatives appointed by Cornell and Qatar Foundation, along with selected independent members, provides advice to the institution's leadership. Cornell University is accredited by the Middle States Commission on Higher Education, with the WCM-Q recognised as an additional location.

== Research ==
WCM-Q launched its biomedical research programme in 2008. Its research activities encompass basic, translational, and clinical biomedical research, supported by specialist laboratories and shared research facilities.

=== Biomedical and precision medicine ===
Research at WCM-Q includes genomics, proteomics, and metabolomics, with studies examining relationships between genetic variation, molecular characteristics, and disease. The institution has participated in the Qatar Genome Programme Research Consortium, which has investigated genetic variation in the Qatari population. Other research has addressed diabetes and its complications, including studies using corneal confocal microscopy to investigate diabetic peripheral neuropathy, as well as tumour metabolism and resistance to chemotherapy.

=== Infectious disease epidemiology ===
WCM-Q's Infectious Disease Epidemiology Group (IDEG) conducts research on the transmission and control of infectious diseases. In 2020, WCM-Q's IDEG was designated a World Health Organisation Collaborating Centre for work on COVID-19 and other selected infectious diseases.

=== Population Health ===
In 2011, WCM-Q established the Division of Global and Public Health, which was subsequently renamed the Institute for Population Health. The institute conducts population-health research and undertakes public health initiatives addressing non-communicable diseases, lifestyle-related health risks, and disease prevention.

=== Research collaborations and training ===
WCM-Q has collaborated with other research and healthcare institutions in Qatar, including Qatar Biobank, Qatar Biomedical Research Institute, and Qatar University. Joint initiatives have included national genomic research projects.

The college also operated research training programmes. Its Biomedical Research Training Programme for Nationals, established in 2011, provides Qatari nationals and longterm residents with training in laboratory research, clinical studies, and research administration.

Medical students can participate in supervised research through initiatives including the Medical Student Research Award, and the premedical Student Research Mentorship Award.

In 2026, WCM-Q and Qatar University signed an agreement enabling students in Qatar University's PhD in Health Sciences course to undertake dissertation research in WCM-Q laboratories, under joint faculty supervision.

== Financial aid and scholarships ==
=== Financial Aid ===
Students and applicants who are citizens of the State of Qatar are required to contact the scholarship office of the Higher Education Institute (HEI) or Sidra Medicine for information on securing funding for their education. International students have the opportunity to receive need-based financial aid through the Qatar Foundation in the form of a zero-interest loan.

=== Scholarships ===
==== Qatar Foundation Scholarship ====
Each year, the scholarship office at Qatar Foundation awards a limited number of scholarships to students based on their exceptional academic performance.

== Architecture ==
WCM-Q's permanent building in Education City was designed by Japanese architect Arata Isozaki and his iNet team, and was completed in 2003. Isozaki was also involved in the early master planning of Education City, placing the medical college within the campus's wider collection of educational buildings.

The complex consists of two parallel elongated halls, approximately 200 metres in length, that are connected by bridges, and contain faculty and student spaces. Parts of the main halls extend through much of the building's height, creating tall internal spaces, which in places exceed 40 feet in height. Its design incorporates references to traditional architecture.

The regional climate also influenced aspects of the building's design. Cornell describes its exterior envelope as using double-layered walls, with glass fibre-reinforced concrete outer panels separated from insulated inner walls, together with a double-layered roof and elevated aluminium louvres intended to reduce solar heat gain. Skylights and ceiling fabric are used to filter and diffuse daylight, while shaded openings limit direct solar exposure. Three approximately 80-foot-high wind towers in the courtyards reference traditional Gulf badgirs, which historically directed cooling breezes into buildings.

== See also ==
- List of universities and colleges in Qatar
- Weill Cornell Medicine, the school's main campus in New York City
