= Mansoor bin Ebrahim bin Saad al-Mahmoud =

Qatari politician

Minister of Public Health
- Incumbent
- Assumed office 12 November 2024
- Monarch: Tamim bin Hamad Al Thani
- Prime Minister: Mohammed bin Abdulrahman Al Thani
- Preceded by: Hanan Mohamed al-Kuwari

Personal details
- Education: George Washington University (B)

Mansoor bin Ebrahim bin Saad al-Mahmoud is the Qatari Minister of Public Health. He was appointed as minister on 12 November 2024.

== Education ==
Al-Mahmoud holds a Bachelor in Business Administration and Finance from George Washington University.

== Career ==
Al-Mahmoud held positions as the head of risk management at Qatar Investment Authority (QIA), the office director of investment affairs for the prime minister and minister of foreign affairs, and the CEO of Qatar Development Bank.

In 2014, al-Mahmoud became Special Advisor to Qatar Museums’ Chairperson al-Mayassa bint Hamad Al Thani. He was also CEO of Qatar Museum and a member of the Board of Qatar National Bank and Qatari Diar. From 2018 until 2024, al-Mahmoud served as the CEO of QIA. He is president of the National Museum of Qatar.

Since 2024, al-Mahmoud has served as Minister of Public Health.
