= Health in Qatar =

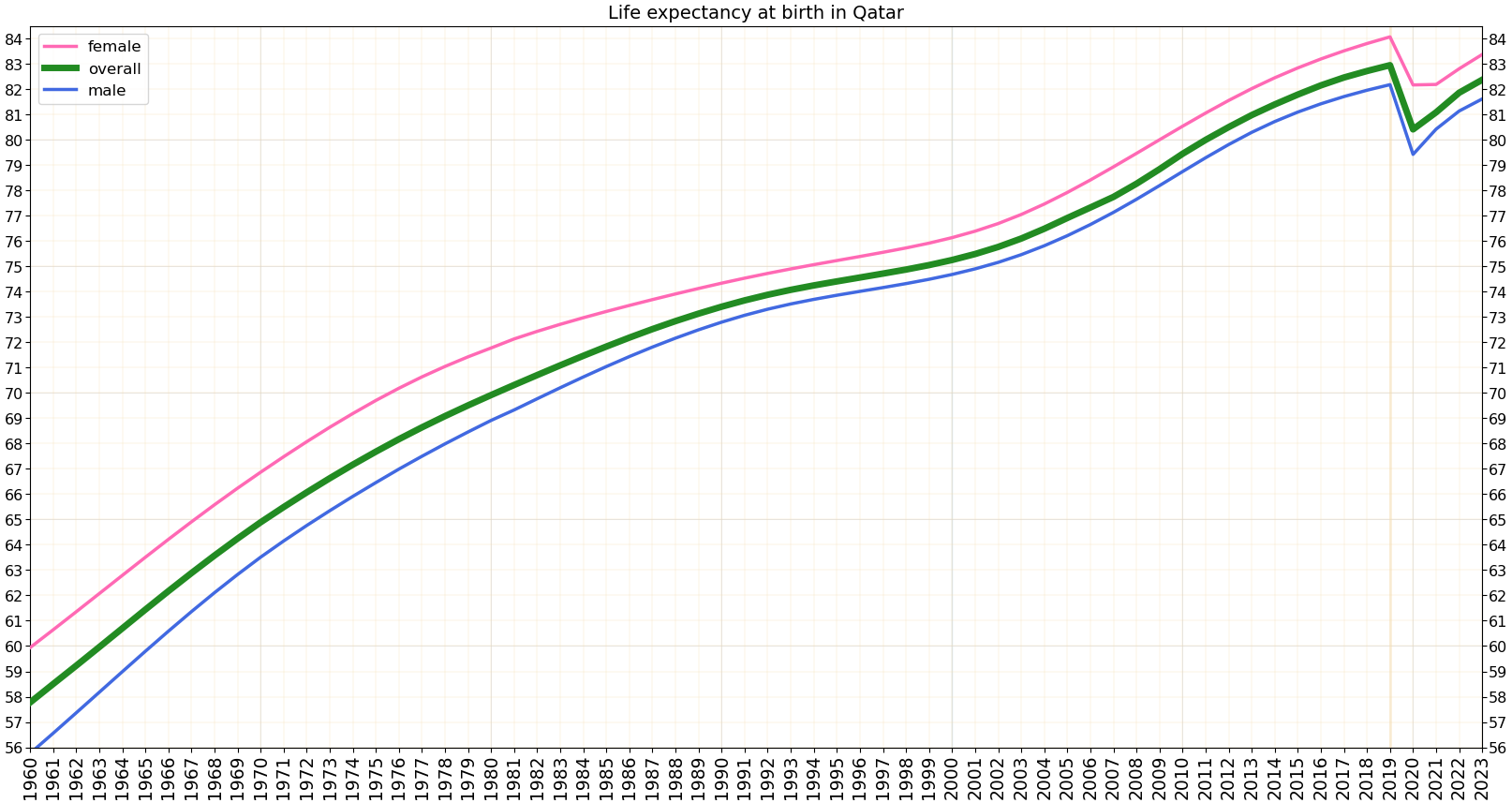
Life expectancy in Qatar

Health in Qatar refers to the overall health status of the population in Qatar, including healthcare services, life expectancy and health issues such as obesity and diabetes. Over recent decades Qatar has increased investment in healthcare, and data shows the changes in life expectancy, infant mortality rate and access to medical services. At the same time, non communicable diseases such as obesity, diabetes and genetic disorders remain a big health concern. Child mortalities have been reduced by over fifty percent since the 1990s. Qatar's healthcare spending per capita is the highest in the Gulf Cooperation Council, standing at $1827 in 2024. The country's progress in health is hampered by exceedingly high rates of obesity, diabetes and genetic disorders.

Currently, health coverage is nationwide. In 2023, the infant mortality rate was 4.9 per 1,000 live births, and life expectancy was 82.7 years.

== Demographics ==
As of 2025, the population of 3.1 million is 76.8% male, and 88.4% are expatriates, with only about 360,000 Qatari citizens. The overall average income is about $76,700 per annum in 2024.

== Healthcare system ==
Qatar's healthcare system is mainly funded and regulated by the government through the Ministry of Public Health. Public healthcare services are provided by organizations such as Hamad Medical Corporation and the Primary Healthcare Corporation, which offer hospital care, primary care and preventive services.

== Health concerns ==
=== Obesity and thinness ===
Historically, obesity has been a significant public health issue in Qatar. In 1980, it was the fourth most obese nation in the world, with 43% of adults being obese. A 2024 report ranked Qatar 17th globally in terms of adult obesity rates in 2022, but still with a rate of 44%. It also found that Qatar had among the highest rates of combined prevalence of underweight and obesity in adults in the world, and the highest in the Middle East and north Africa region for men.

A 2023 report showed that in the academic year 2019-2020 49.3% of children 5-14 were overweight or obese (with 27.7% being obese and 21.6% overweight), an increase from the 44% measured in the academic year 2016–2017. While rates of obesity rose for both citizen and non-citizen children in Qatar, the increase was more dramatic among Qatari citizen children, of whom 53.8% were overweight or obese (with 20.1% being obese and 33.7% overweight). The 2024 report also found that Qatari school-age boys had the highest combined prevalence of obesity and unhealthy thinness in the world, tied with Chile.

Several factors contribute to high obesity rates in Qatar, including limited physical activity due to urban environments that rely heavily on car use. Other contributing factors include genetic predispositions common in Gulf populations, cultural norms that favor calorie-dense diets, junk food ads targeting children, and disrupted sleeping patterns, which are common among Gulf youth "due to erratic bedtimes and screen overuse".

=== Diabetes ===
The country has among the highest rates of obesity, diabetes and genetic disorders in the world. It has the highest rate of obesity among boys in the MENA region.

As of 2024, 24.6% of the adult population in Qatar are estimated to have diabetes, with an estimated 46.4% being undiagnosed. The government has launched numerous campaigns and initiatives to combat the rise in diabetes; the establishment of the Qatar Diabetes Association being one of its most notable initiatives.

Diabetes in Qatar is closely associated with obesity and lifestyle factors such as physical inactivity and diet. Some cases remain undiagnosed which affects early treatment and management

=== Birth defects ===
According to March of Dimes's global report on birth defects published in 2006, Qatar ranked in the top 20 countries globally for the number of birth defects per 1,000 births. The rate stands at 73.4 per 10,000 live births. According to March of Dimes, Qatar ranked 16th globally for the number of birth defects per 1,000 births; this is in part due to the high degree of consanguinity in marriages (marriage between relatives).

=== Mental health ===
In Qatar, mental health typically has a stigma around it. Studies have been done on the three groups that make up Qatar, which are the labor migrants, white collar migrants, and non-migrants. The odds of depression are significantly increased in the labor migrant and white-collar migrant groups compared to the non-migrant group. One of the explaining factors behind this difference is the quality of life. The thought process is that migrants have to face major life changes and have to adapt to living in Qatar. The 'culture shock' migrants experience is a major contributor to declining mental health. In 2014, about 0.36% of the healthcare budget was spent on mental health services, which is seven times lower than the median for upper-middle-income nations. Major depressive disorder (20.4%) and generalized anxiety disorder (19.1%) are the most frequent cases seen.

== See also ==
- Healthcare in Qatar
- List of countries by Body Mass Index (BMI)
