= The Miraculous Journey =

Series of bronze sculptures by Damian Hurst

Coordinates: 25.320907°N 51.444655°E

The Miraculous Journey (2005 to 2013) is a series of 14 bronze sculptures by the artist Damien Hirst. The sculptures are situated outside the Sidra Medical and Research Center in Doha, Qatar. The sculptures show the development of a human foetus in the womb, ending with a 46 feet (14 m) tall sculpture of a baby boy. Hirst said that his fascination with childbirth began after the birth of his own children, saying that "Everyone talks about our life's journey, but we have a whole journey before you're born".

The work was originally unveiled in 2013, but was covered up until November 2018. At its 2013 unveiling each sculpture was covered with a balloon that slowly opened to reveal each piece.

The intermediate sculptures vary from 5 metres (16 ft) to 11 metres (36 ft) in height and collectively weigh 216 tonnes, with the final piece reaching a height of 14 metres (46 ft). The piece is believed to have cost $20 million.

The chairperson of Qatar Museums, Al-Mayassa bint Hamad bin Khalifa Al-Thani, visited Hirst's studio in Gloucestershire, England, and was shown drawings from 2005 that Hirst had made of prenatal development. Hirst had intended them to be monumental sculptures, and Al-Mayassa imagined situating them in front of the Sidra Medical Center.
