= Trade unions in Qatar =

Qatar has been a member of the International Labour Organization since 1972, but has not ratified the Freedom of Association and Protection of the Right to Organise Convention, 1948, or the Right to Organise and Collective Bargaining Convention, 1949.

Trade unions were outlawed by the government in 1957 in response to a large number of recurrent strikes being carried out by workers in the Qatar Petroleum Company (today QatarEnergy). In May, 2004, the Emir ruled that workers were allowed to form trade unions and professional associations. Additional reforms saw the right to strike, a ban on employment of youths under 16, an eight-hour working day, and equal labour rights for women legislated as part of a general reform process in Qatar. The International Transport Workers' Federation and the International Trade Union Confederation have alleged that the Qatari government fails to enforce its 2004 labor law on a consistent basis, with the former criticizing Qatar Airways' treatment of its female employees, and the latter challenging Qatar's treatment of migrant workers.
