= Qatar Genome Programme =

The Qatar Genome Programme aims to sequence the genomes of 350,000 inhabitants of Qatar. Supported by the Sidra Medical and Research Center, the program is managed by Qatar Genome Committee and wants to eventually offer personalized healthcare in Qatar to its population with advances in genomics. The Qatar Genome Programme published its first genome-wide association study with 45 clinically relevant traits in 2021

Apart from the Qatar Genome Programme, a number of other genome-scale studies have emerged from Qatar, including ones looking at the pharmacogenetic map of Qatar from genome and exome sequences available in public domain. The availability of population-scale genomes from Qatar has also enabled the evaluation of Incidental genetic findings which provides an estimate of the pathogenicity and frequency of such variants in the population, thereby forming the basis of genomic medicine in Qatar. Genetic epidemiological studies by integrating genomic data and variant annotations are also underway for autoinflammatory diseases

The allele frequencies of population-scale genomes are also available

== See also ==
- Estonian Genome Project
