= Sidra Medicine =

Coordinates: 25°19′22.0″N 51°26′41.6″E

- Qatar Foundation

Geography
- Location: Education City, Al Rayyan Municipality, Qatar

Organisation
- Affiliated university: Weill Cornell Medical College in Qatar

Services
- Beds: 400

History
- Founded: December 2006

Links
- Website: http://www.sidra.org/

Sidra Medicine (formerly known as Sidra Medical and Research Centre) is a 400-bed hospital and research center in Doha, Qatar. It forms part of Qatar Foundation's Education City campus and provides specialised tertiary healthcare for women, children, and adolescents. Sidra Medicine is also a clinical affiliate and teaching hospital of Weill Cornell Medicine-Qatar.

The hospital first opened its outpatient facility in May 2016 and its inpatient hospital in January 2018. Its specialised clinical services include paediatric medicine and surgery, women's health, renal transplantation, gene therapy, and haematopoietic stem cell transplantation.

== Location and site ==
Sidra Hospital as seen from Education City Mosque

Sidra Medicine is located in Al Gharrafa, Al Rayyan, and forms part of Qatar Foundation's Education City campus, a city-scale initiative. The medical centre was positioned as a gateway to Education City, with a tunnel linking it directly to Weill Cornell Medicine-Qatar.

The complex was designed by Pelli Clarke & Partners. Its three atriums were inspired by the sails of traditional dhows.

Outside the hospital is a series of 14 giant bronze sculptures by Damien Hirst called The Miraculous Journey, graphically charting the development of a baby in the uterus from conception to birth. It is owned by the Qatar Foundation. The installation was first unveilled in 2013, subsequently covered during construction of the hospital, and returned to public view in 2018 around Sidra Medicine's official inauguration.

== History ==
The building project for Sidra Medicine was announced in June 2004 as a specialty teaching hospital for Education City. In February 2007, the project was formally named Sidra Medical and Research Centre. The hospital was to provide a clinical affiliate teaching environment for Weill Cornell Medicine-Qatar (WCM-Q).

Qatar Foundation, a quasi-government organization, supported the hospital construction project with a $7.9 billion endowment. In 2008, Qatar Foundation awarded the construction contract to a joint venture of OHL International and Contrack. After the project missed earlier completion targets, Qatar Foundation terminated the contract with in July 2014 and appointed Midmac-Consolidated Contractors Company joint venture to complete the facility.

Outpatient care facilities and services were opened in May 2016. In October 2017, Sidra Medical and Research Centre was renamed Sidra Medicine as the institution announced plans for a phased opening of its inpatient hospital, beginning in January 2018.

Sidra opened its main 400-bed hospital to its first patients on 14 January 2018, with services introduced throughout the year. The Children's Emergency Department opened in July, and Sidra Medicine was formally inaugurated on 12 November 2018. Roughly 3,900 staff members were retained by Sidra at the time of inaugurating its inpatient hospital.

On 24 September 2018, a multidisciplinary team at Sidra Medicine separated four-month old conjoined twins in a nine-hour operation, reported as the first conjoined-twin separation performed in Qatar.

In 2019, Sidra Medicine and Hamad Medical Corporation jointly performed Sidra's first two living-donor paediatric kidney transplants, marking the launch of paediatric renal transplant services at the hospital.

On 13 May 2024, Sidra and the Children's Hospital of Philadelphia announced they had entered into a Memorandum of Understanding to establish the first-ever pediatric bone marrow transplant program in Qatar. Sidra Medicine opened a dedicated paediatric haematopoietic stem cell transplant (HSCT) ward in June 2025. In december 2025, it performed Qatar's first reported paediatric allogeneic HSCT.

== Clinical services ==
Sidra Medicine provides specialised tertiary care for women, children, and adolescents, including paediatric medical and surgical services and women's health services. Sidra opened its outpatient clinic in May 2016. Throughout 2017, more than 25,000 people were treated at the hospital's outpatient clinic and by 2018, Sidra provided more than 50 outpatient clinics and services.

Its specialised paediatric services include renal transplantation, developed in partnership with Hamad Medical Corporation (Qatar's public health provider), following the introduction of living-donor paediatric kidney transplantation at Sidra in 2019.

Sidra has also developed gene and cell-based clinical services. Its Duchenne muscular dystrophy programme began administering Elevidys gene therapy in 2024 and subsequently expanded this to include children over six years old.

Paediatric haematopoietic stem cell transplantation is provided through a dedicated HSCT service established in 2025.

== Research ==
By 2015, Sidra's research branch was participating in the pilot phase of the Qatar Genome Project, carrying out whole genome sequencing and data generation for a planned cohort of 3000 Qataris.

Sidra Medicine's pathology laboratories received College of American Pathologists accreditation in 2019. In 2020, the hospital introduced a digital anatomical pathology platform, reported as the first fully digital anatomical pathology laboratory in the Middle East.

During the COVID-19 pandemic, Sidra Medicine's laboratory participated in Qatar's PCR-testing effort.

In November 2023, Sidra Medicine opened a Good Manufacturing Practice facility licensed by Qatar's Ministry of Public Health to support the manufacture and processing of individualised biopharmaceutical, cell, and gene therapies.

== Education and accreditation ==
Sidra Medicine is a clinical affiliate and teaching hospital of Weill Cornell Medicine-Qatar, which is located in Education City. The relationship formed part of Sidra's development as an academic medical centre, with the hospital intended to provide clinical training for WCM-Q students. An affiliation agreement between Qatar Foundation and WCM-Q was signed in October 2010, under which WCM-Q was designated Sidra's primary partner. WCM-Q students subsequently undertook clinical rotations at Sidra, while Sidra physicians have held affiliate faculty appointments at the medical college.

Sidra Medicine received institutional accreditation from ACGME International for graduate medical education effective 1 July 2019. By 2021, ACGME-I-accredited fellowship programmes at Sidra included paediatric surgery, radiology, nephrology, neonatal-perinatal medicine, in addition to pre-existing accreditations for paediatric pulmonology, cardiology, neurology, and child and adolescent mental health.

The hospital and academic medical centre received Joint Commission International (JCI) accreditation in February 2010 and was reaccredited in March 2023.

In 2024, Sidra Medicine received institutional accreditation from the Royal College of Physicians and Surgeons of Canada for postgraduate medical education, enabling it to seek Royal College accreditation for individual residency programmes.

== See also ==
- List of hospitals in Qatar
