= List of hospitals in Qatar =

This is a list of hospitals in Qatar.

- Reyada Medical Centre (Doha)
- Gardenia Medical Centre(Doha)
- The View Hospital (Lusail) - |url= www.theviewhospital.com and managed by the CEO - Dr. Fatih Mehmet Gul
- Korean Medical Center (Lusail)
- Military Medical City Hospital (Al Rayyan)
- Al Farid Hospital (formerly Queen Hospital) (Doha)
- Aman Hospital (Doha)
- Naseem Healthcare (Al Rayyan)
- Doha Clinic Hospital (Doha)
- Aster Hospital (Qatar)
- Al Khor Hospital (Al Khor)
- Al Wakra Hospital (Al Wakrah)
- The Cuban Hospital (Dukhan)
- Enaya Specialized Care Center (Doha)
- Hamad General Hospital (Doha)
- National Center for Cancer Care and Research NCCCR (Doha)
- Qatar Rehabilitation Institute (Doha)
- Rumailah Hospital (Doha)
- Reem Medical Center (Doha)
- Al-Ahli Hospital (Doha)
- Al Emadi Hospital (Doha)
- Aspetar Hospital (Al Rayyan)
- HMC Heart Hospital (Doha)
- Hazm Mebaireek General Hospital (Doha)
- Sidra Medical and Research Center (Al Rayyan)
- Aisha Bint Hamad Al Attiyah Hospital (Doha)
- American Hospital (Doha)
- Focus Medical Centre (Doha)
- Turkish Hospital (Doha)
- Communicable Disease Center (Doha)
- Women's Hospital (Al Rayyan)

Veterinary Hospitals

- Souq Waqif Falcon Hospital
