= Hamad Medical Corporation =

Hamad Medical Corporation مؤسسة حمد الطبية

Geography
- Location: Doha, Qatar

Organisation
- Care system: Public hospital

Services
- Emergency department: Yes

Links
- Website: https://www.hamad.qa/
- Lists: Hospitals in Qatar

Hamad Medical Corporation (HMC) is Qatar's main not-for-profit health care provider, and is based in Doha. It was established by Emiri Decree No. 35 in 1979. HMC manages several hospitals, as well as emergency, specialized, and ambulatory care centers, and operates both the national ambulance service and a home healthcare service.

HMC is the only healthcare organization outside the United States to receive simultaneous Joint Commission International (JCI) re-accreditation for all its hospitals, and in 2011 the ambulance service and home healthcare service also received JCI accreditation.

== Facilities ==
=== Rumailah Hospital ===
Opened in 1957, the Rumailah Hospital is a 644-bed hospital offering rehabilitative services for disabled children, adults and elderly people. The hospital has seven operating rooms, a laboratory, and a radiology unit with MRI, ultrasound, and bone densitometry equipment.

=== Hamad General Hospital ===
Hamad General Hospital is a 603-bed facility in Doha that offers trauma, emergency medicine, pediatrics, critical care, specialized surgery, specialized medicine, laboratory medicine, and radiology services. Expansions are being made to accommodate the increasingly large population of the city, and a diabetes unit is being created within the hospital to treat the large numbers of diabetic patients in Qatar.

=== Women's Wellness and Research Center ===
The center provides specialized care for women and infants, currently providing obstetrics, gynecology, neonatal care, emergency care, and newborn screening services.

The center opened in 2017 and in 2018 superseded the Women's Hospital, established in 1988, with all services except in vitro fertilization, infertility, and pediatric audiology clinics moving.

=== National Center for Cancer Care and Research (NCCCR) ===
Formerly known as Al Amal Hospital, the NCCCR is an 86-bed research facility opened in 2004 that offers treatment for cancer patients.

=== Heart Hospital ===
A cardiology specialty facility adjacent to Rumailah Hospital, the Heart Hospital facility was opened in 2010, and has 116 beds.

=== Al Wakra Hospital ===
Opened in December 2012, this 325-bed hospital serves the rapidly growing towns of Al Wakrah and Mesaieed in southern Qatar. Areas of specialty include general medicine, general surgery, pediatrics and pediatric emergency, obstetrics and gynecology.

=== Al Khor Hospital ===
Serving the community in the country's north, Al Khor Hospital opened in 2005. The hospital has 115 beds, including 10 for pediatrics. The hospital offers general medical care, general surgery, emergency medicine, obstetrics, pediatrics, and neonatal care.

=== Enaya Specialized Care Center ===
The Enaya Specialized Care Center is a support facility that works with Hamad General Hospital and Rumailah Hospital. Its stated purpose is providing 24-hour care to long-term patients who are in a stable condition. The center has 156 patient beds.

=== Hazm Mebaireek General Hospital (HMGH) ===
HMGH is a community general hospital for adult males living and working in the Industrial Area of Doha. It offers a range of inpatient and outpatient care. Some surgical cases such as general surgery or less complex orthopedics, plastics or urology procedures will also be seen. The hospital also houses an Emergency Department for walk-in patients as well as HMC, Primary Health Care Corporation, and Qatar Red Crescent referrals and ambulance transfers.

=== Cuban Hospital ===
The Cuban Hospital is a Dukhan-based joint venture between the Qatari government and the government of Cuba via its policy of medical internationalism. It was officially opened on 10 January 2012, and is staffed by over 400 medical professionals from Cuba, supported by local staff and contractors.

=== Aisha Bint Hamad Al Attiyah Hospital (AAH) ===
AAH, located south of Al Khor, began a phased opening in 2022, scheduled for completion in mid-2023. It is set to have 300 single-occupancy inpatient beds, with 232 reserved for general and acute patients and the remainder for critical care patients. In addition to emergency services, it will also contain "operating theaters, obstetrics and gynecology service, neonatal intensive care, outpatient clinics, robotic pharmacy, laboratory services, and purpose-built VIP inpatient and critical care rooms."

== Academic Health System ==
Launched in August 2011, the Academic Health System (AHS) is an initiative formed in close collaboration with Weill Cornell Medical College in Qatar, as well as other academic, healthcare and research partners such as Qatar University, the University of Calgary – Qatar, College of the North Atlantic – Qatar, Sidra Medical and Research Center, the Primary Health Care Corporation, and the Qatar Biomedical Research Institute (QBRI). The purpose of the initiative is to integrate health, education, and research through collaboration between each partner institution, in order to achieve the highest possible quality healthcare in Qatar. The Qatar Metabolic Institute operates under the umbrella of the AHS.

== Acknowledgments ==
Hamad has the following accreditations:

- Joint Commission International
- Accreditation Canada International
- College of American Pathologists
- American Nurses Credentialing Center
- International Academy of Emergency Dispatch
- European Aero Medical Institute

== See also ==
- List of hospitals in Qatar
