= Ministry of Public Health (Qatar) =

Qatar governmental body responsible for public health

The Ministry of Public Health of Qatar sets the national strategy for health care in the country and also provides Qatari citizens with free national health insurance. The current minister is Mansoor bin Ebrahim bin Saad Al Mahmoud.

== Ministry tasks ==
The Ministry of Public Health is concerned with everything related to public health affairs, and in particular it shall have the following:

- Supervising the provision of health care services.
- Providing preventive and curative health services
- Spreading and developing health awareness.
- Organizing and supervising the establishment of health facilities by the private sector.
- Supervising the health insurance system.
- Supervising hospitals and primary health care centers.
- Supervising the practice of medical, paramedical and pharmacy professions.
- Developing electronic medical strategies and capabilities.
- Supporting health care research.
- Maintaining a system for preparedness and response to national health emergencies.
- Supervising the treatment of citizens abroad.
- Regulating food safety issues.

== Ministry achievements ==
During 2019, the scope of health care services provided in the country expanded, as:

- The opening of the Emergency and Accident Center at Hamad General Hospital in September, which was equipped with medical equipment for the care and diagnostic services and an oxygen therapy room.
- The opening of a new stroke department, which combines urgent health care services for stroke patients.
- Completing the second phase of the expansion of surgical services, which helped improve patient flows by adding new patient rooms and recovery rooms.
- The opening of the emergency department at the Women's Wellness and Research Center, where patients were transferred from the neonatal intensive care unit of the former Women's and Maternity Hospital to the new facility.
- Inauguration of the Cardiac MRI unit at the Heart Hospital.

=== Maternal and child health ===
The Ministry of Health launched home care services for new mothers and their children after childbirth, which is the first of its kind in Qatar, and is available to new mothers who have had a high-risk pregnancy or caesarean section and need intensive care.

=== Care programs for the elderly ===
The health sector has made improvements in the curative care programs for the elderly, as Hamad Medical Corporation established geriatric advisory services in the emergency department, in addition to the opening of the elderly clinic, which aims to facilitate access to care services, support their exit and refer critical cases to specialized care services. It also launched a specialized fall prevention clinic for the elderly at Rumailah Hospital, and established the Senior Orthopedic Service at Hamad General Hospital.

=== Develop health care cadres ===
The percentage of the workforce in the public health sector increased to 3.7 percent in 2019, equivalent to 36,554 employees, in order to meet the requirements of providing health care services.

=== Electronic drug and food control systems ===
In 2019 the electronic food control system launched. And a chemical department was opened to detect pesticides, and the Central Food Laboratory succeeded in passing the evaluation of the American National Accreditation Council. The electronic system project for pharmacy management and drug control was also developed, which is an electronic system designed for the registration of pharmaceutical products.

=== COVID-19 ===
Since the beginning of the year 2020, the health sector in Qatar has faced COVID-19 pandemic and provided the necessary health care services for COVID-19 patients.

Some of the most important factors that contributed to the success of Qatar's experience in addressing the pandemic and reducing its effects are:

- Qatar has established a governance structure for crisis and emergency management.
- The government established a plan for response and communication, and increased the capacity of health care facilities.
- Adopting strict travel policies that take into account the nature of the spread of infection, and the ability of the health system to absorb it.
- The state's commitment to its social and humanitarian role, and its contribution to supporting humanitarian and medical initiatives with the aim of alleviating the repercussions of the epidemic on humanity.

=== Other programs ===
- A project to implement the plans of the National Oral and Dental Health Program.
- Launched a guide to provides all the information that may need to access the health care services.
- Establishment of a scientific committee to look into the water fluoridation policy in Qatar.
- Organizing the mechanism of updating the nutritional label components of bottled water to indicate the percentage of fluoride.
- Launching the Qatar National Dementia Plan, as the plan was prepared to meet the global directives of the World Health Organization.
- Collaborate with communications and technology service providers to make improvements to internal and government communications systems.
