= Emblem of Qatar =

- Armiger: State of Qatar
- Adopted: 2022 (current version)
- Shield: A dhow sailing on waves, behind it two palm trees and all gules
- Supporters: Two scimitars gules
- Motto: دولة قطر; State of Qatar
- Earlier version
- Designer: Fouad Mohammad Ahmad Al Shibiny

The national emblem of Qatar (Arabic: شعار قطر) is one of the official symbols of the state of Qatar. The emblem was initially adopted six years after the termination of the British protectorate, with the gained independence as a country under Sheikh Ahmad bin Ali Al Thani, and was designed by Egyptian designer Fouad Mohammad Ahmad Al Shibiny, under the reign the Emir of Qatar Khalifa bin Hamad Al Thani in 1976.

The latest version of the national emblem was unveiled on 15 September 2022 at the National Museum of Qatar. The new emblem also features the historical Qatari symbols found on the previous emblem: the founder's sword, palm trees, sea and the traditional boat, except all in the maroon colour placed against a white backdrop.

The official interpretation published by the Amiri Diwan (the sovereign body and the administrative office of the Emir) is as follows.

The Coat of Arms of the State of Qatar depicts a variety of meanings and values of different geographical and cultural connotations. It reflects an interactive and harmonious interface between wild and marine lives. It also depicts the palm tree height and its sense of giving, recalling of Arab mightiest swords, the sense of dignity and safe haven.

— Amiri Diwan, Coat of Arms of the State of Qatar

== Previous version as a national seal (1976–2022) ==
The previous national seal of Qatar shows two crossed white curved Arab swords in a yellow circle. Between the swords there is a sailing boat (Dhow) sailing on blue and white waves beside an island with two palm trees. The circle is surrounded by an additional circle, which is divided horizontally between the two colours of the flag. In the white section, the name of the state of Qatar is written in black and in Arabic, while in the maroon section, the country's official name is written in a white Old English font.

== National colour of Qatar ==
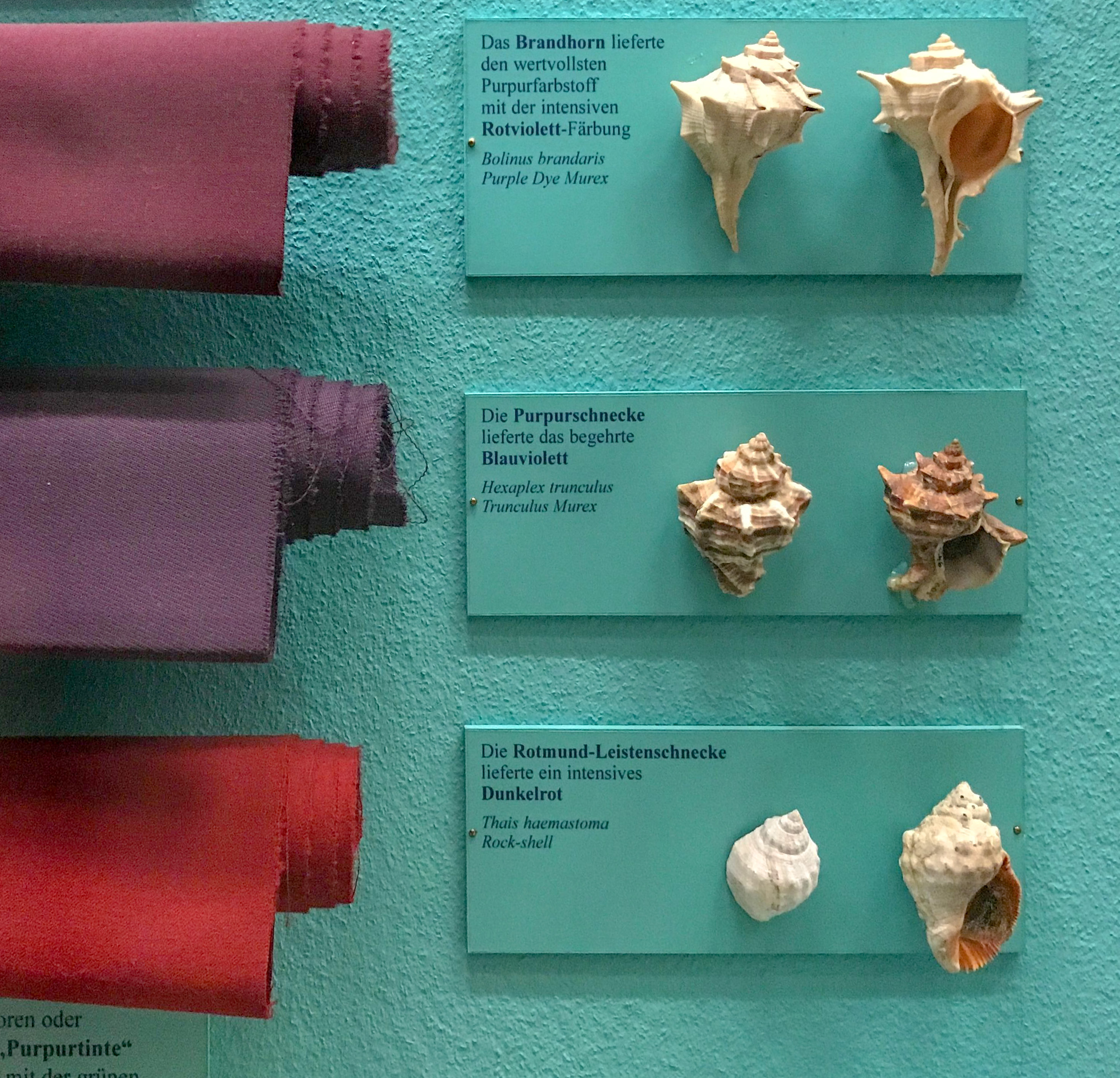
Fabrics of different colour next to their corresponding sea snail. The German texts labels them as red-violet, blue-violet, and dark red respectively.

The national colour of the state of Qatar, outlined in 2015 by the Qatari government as Pantone 1955 C Maroon, is rooted in the origins of Qatar's history, and the factors that made it an independent nation. Being the first known place to mass-produce shellfish dye, where large amounts were known to be initially found in Khor Ile-Sud, modern day Qatar. The current colour used in the emblem and flag is the same to the original purple dye that was sourced, and distributed in Khor Ile-Sud. The dye was obtained from the Murex snail and was known as "Tyrian purple". Before the state of Qatar's conception, the purple dye was a valuable commodity and the area surrounding Al Khor Island and was under contention of the Sasanian Empire, gaining control over much of the Persian Gulf. In his History of Animals, Aristotle described the shellfish from which Tyrian purple was obtained and the process of extracting the tissue that produced the dye.

The adoption of this maroon began with Sheikh Mohammed bin Thani in 1932, when Qatar shifted from using a more traditional red, which was too similar to the flag of the neighbouring country Bahrain. This change allowed Qatar's flag to become more distinguished, and also gave national identity to the new colour maroon that was then adopted, as by 1932, the area in the Persian Gulf surrounding the city of Al Khor, referred to as Khor-Shaqiq, was the largest source of the Tyrian purple shellfish dye in the world.

== Symbolism ==
The emblem of Qatar contains symbolic references to its history and culture, and each item in the emblem has some reference when looking at the inception of Qatar as an independent state. The emblem's design is primarily based on the trinity of sand, sea and sky—three elements that are closely associated with Qatar's history.

=== The Dhow ===
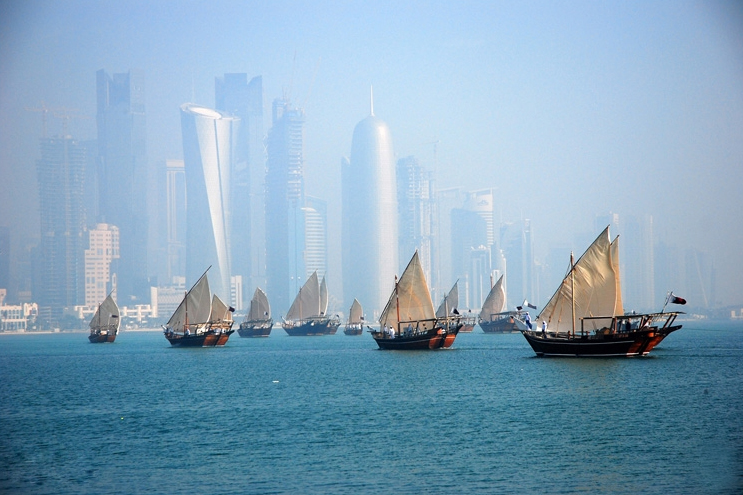
Traditional Arabic dhows during a celebration of National Day (Qatar)

The dhow on the insignia is a reference to the pearling industry as the main factor in the stimulation of the economic and social growth of Qatar as a nation. The boat played a large part in the creation of the state as an economically sound country and is to this day is a part of Qatar's economic stability, with imports and exports in 2018 accounting for over 54% of the county's GDP thus making the state of Qatar financially reliant on the seas and their assets.

During the ascendancy of the Abbasid caliphate in Baghdad, Qatar's surrounding bodies of water became famed for their riches, as the pearling industry grew larger, and the demand for Qatari pearl increased in the East, which extended as far as China. These waters also became one of the main sources for the production of Tyrian Purple which had gained popularity throughout the East for its symbolic value in royalty and its artistic references from the likes of Theodoor van Thulden in Hercules' Dog Discovers Purple Dye.

The dhow on the new national emblem is called Fath al-Khair, named after the first traditional wooden, motor-powered ship in Qatar's history. Built in 1900, the dhow was owned by Sheikh Hamad bin Abdullah Al Thani, and was usually used for pearl diving and trading trips.

=== Two Date Palms ===
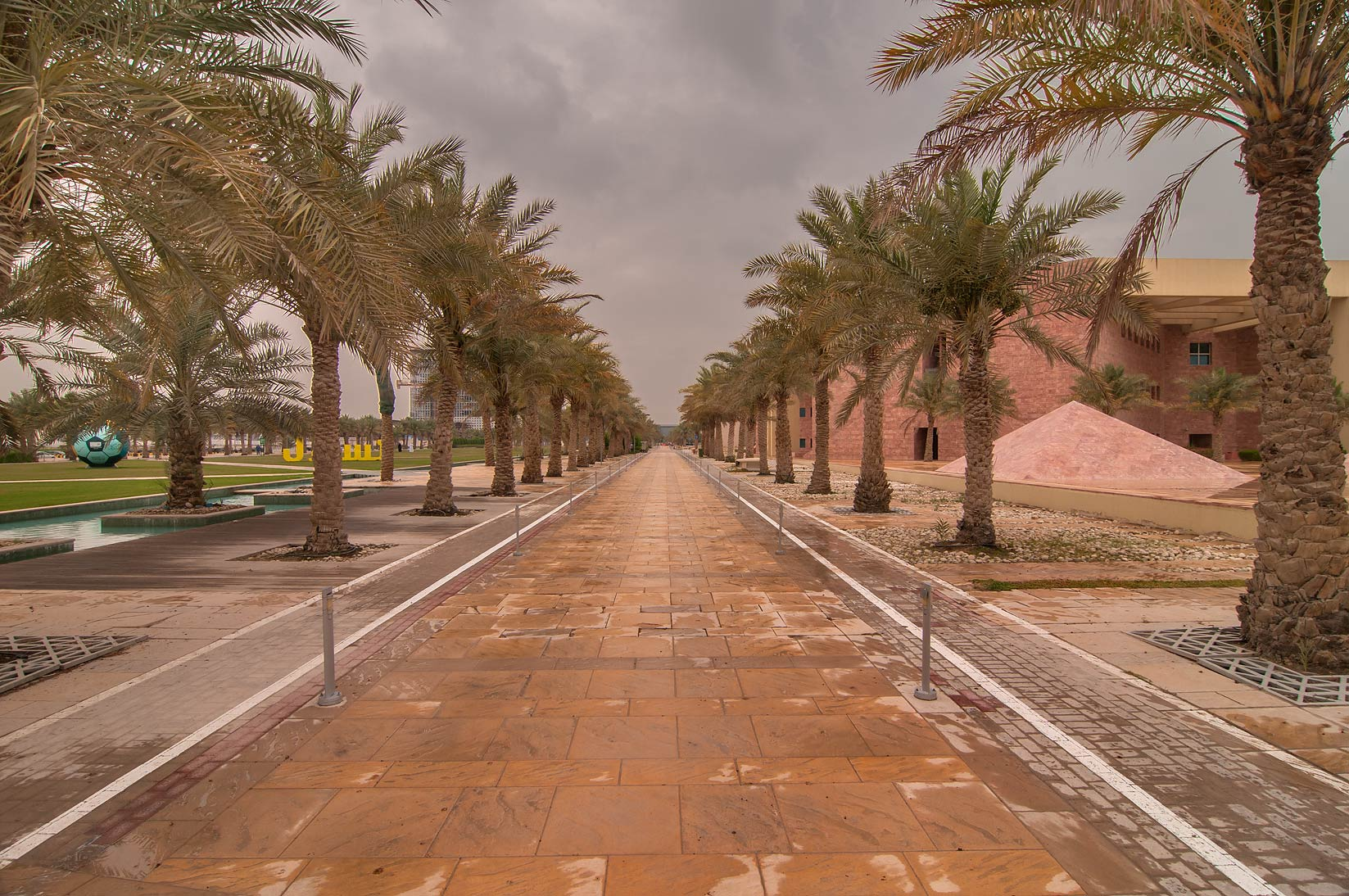
Long walkway shaded by palm trees during rainy day in Education City, Qatar

With dates being the mainly cultivated fruit by the countries of the Middle East and North Africa, Qatar officially recognises the two date palms as a symbol of giving and the Arab dignity, with its height in the emblem being equal to that of the dhow, to reflect the state's generosity in giving. The edible fruits of date palms are popular local delicacies, especially during Ramadan and at majlis gatherings. Date palm syrup manufacturing was also a traditional practice; with the syrup being popular due to its high-calorie content and nutrient density; it was a cheap and quick source of energy for the locals, particularly pearl divers.

Qatar has also played a role in the research of the Phoenix dactylifera (date palm). In 2009 a team of researchers from the Weill Cornell Medical College in Qatar published their findings on the Date palm Genome, by using "whole genome shotgun next generation DNA sequencing". According to one of the researchers who had established the genomics laboratory in 2008

"We have increased the publicly available knowledge of the date palm gene by about 1,000 fold."

— Weill Cornell Medicine, Qatar - Cornell University

The palm tree on the new national emblem is inspired by a tree on the farm of the late Grandfather Amir Sheikh Khalifa bin Hamad Al Thani in Al Ashra.

=== Two Scimitars Gules ===
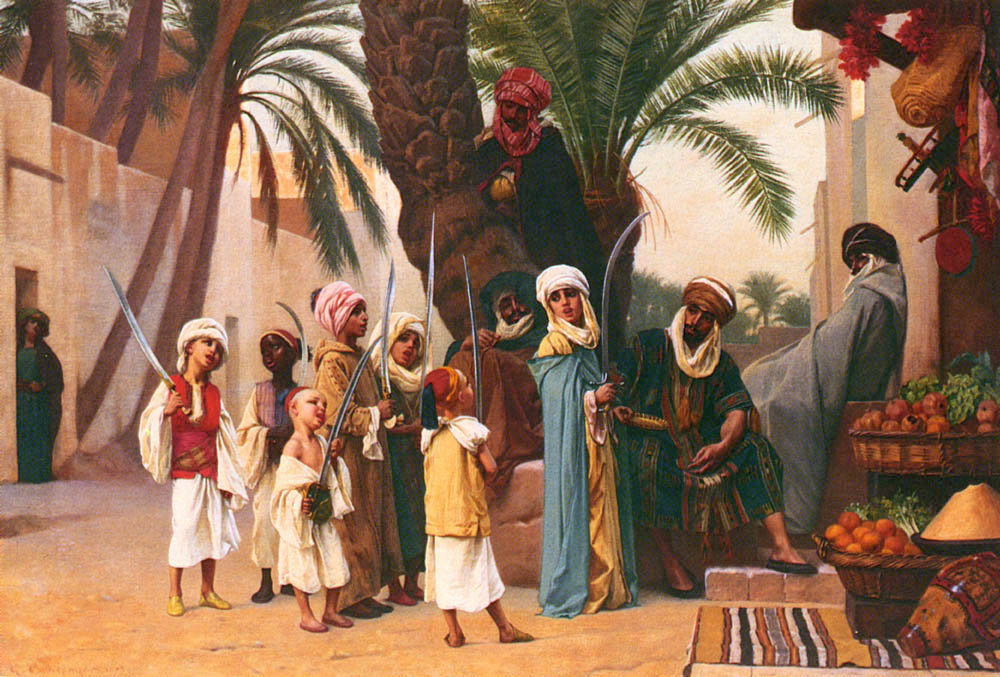
Arabs with scimitars from Boulanger's painting of One Thousand and One Nights

Officially known as a scimitar, the curved sword is known to be a depiction of Qatar's "might as an Arab country" and a “safe haven” for its people. The two crossed scimitars are a feature shared with the Emblem of Saudi Arabia, as is the palm tree, likely due to the weapon's role in Arabian history, and the date palm being the most cultivated fruit in the Arab peninsula. The curved sword or "scimitar" was widespread throughout the Middle East from at least the Ottoman period until the age of smokeless powder firearms had relegated swords to dress and ceremonial function.

Additionally, the Arabian Scimitar has presence in Islamic history, with the most famed being that of Ali Ibn Abi Talib, the first imam in the Shia school of thought and fourth Sunni Caliph. With Zulfiqar being the name of the double bladed sword that was wielded by Ali, as depicted by Islamic scholars.

On the new national emblem, the sword has been redesigned to be as close as possible to the original description of the Founder Sheikh Jassim bin Mohammed Al Thani's sword.

=== The Sea ===
The sea is a symbol of Qatari heritage. Sailing, fishing and pearl diving are among the country's richest traditions. History recalls a time that these traditions also formed the main sources of income in Qatar. Waves have been drawn using the nine-point serrated edges of Qatar's flag, which also symbolise the sea's strength. Three lines represent waves to symbolize Qatar's three-sided encirclement by water.

== Usage ==
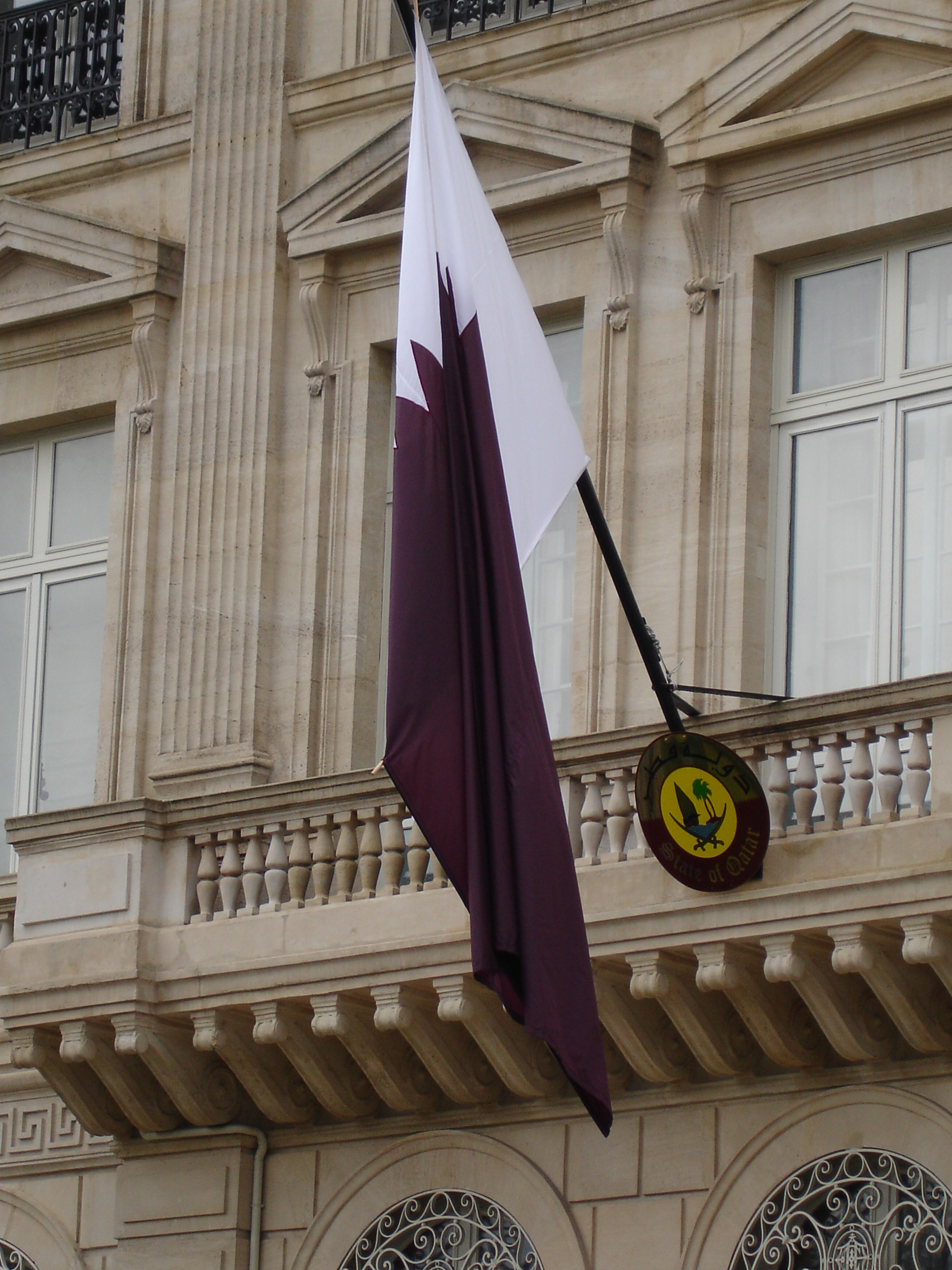
Flag and emblem of Qatar, displayed above the entrance of the Qatari Embassy in Paris

The emblem of Qatar is used across departments of government and in official documents, its mark is a symbol of authority and power used by various bodies of government. The emblem carries presence in statutory and non-statutory authorities included. The current Qatar emblem can be found on the front of the Qatari passport, birth certificates, some official university documents and other non-official documents used throughout the state.

Additionally, the emblem is printed on Qatari riyal notes, and embossed on the Hamad and Tamim coins.

Different parts of the emblem are occasionally used independently in different government branches. The two crossed scimitars are used in the Qatar Armed Forces for the types of Military ranks of the state. As per the states rank insignia's, the highest-ranking officials in the Navy and Air Force are those with the two crossed scimitars taken from the emblem.

In 2022, the Government Communications Office created a Government Brand Assets team dedicated to assisting all government entities in adopting the new government brand identity.

== Historical emblems ==
1966–1976

1976–2022

== See also ==
- Flag of Qatar
