= Qatari nationality law =

Qatari Citizenship Act

Parliament of Qatar
- Long title: An Act relating to Qatari citizenship
- Enacted by: Government of Qatar
- Status: Current legislation

Qatari nationality law is based mostly on jus sanguinis. Qatari citizens enjoy freedom of movement between other Gulf Cooperation Council member states. For a period of time though, this was stopped unless there were extenuating circumstances.

== By birth ==
Children born in Qatar do not automatically acquire Qatari citizenship by virtue of their place of birth.

== By descent ==
- Any person who can demonstrate Qatari descent may apply to be a citizen of Qatar, depending on certain conditions.
- Any person born to a Qatari father irrespective of their place of birth are Qatari citizens by descent.

== By naturalization ==
There is no defined process for applying for Qatari citizenship by naturalization. Grants are rare, and since 2005, there has been a cap of a maximum of 50 people per year.

Foreigners may be granted citizenship if they fulfil the following conditions

- Lawful residence in the State of Qatar for no less than 25 consecutive years before applying for citizenship.
- Availability of legitimate means to earn one's living and meet one's needs.
- Good conduct and behavior, in addition to absence of previous conviction by final ruling in a crime of dishonor or mistrust, whether inside or outside Qatar.

== By marriage ==
The wife of a naturalized person may be, by an Emiri decision, granted Qatari nationality by virtue of her husband, provided that her stay with him in Qatar extends for a period of at least five years from the date her husband acquired Qatari nationality. The wife will not lose her citizenship in the event that the marriage contract is broken.

== Dual citizenship ==
Qatar does not recognize dual citizenship. Holding another citizenship that's not allowed may lead to the revoking of Qatari citizenship.

== Loss of Qatari citizenship ==
The person may lose Qatari citizenship in the following cases:

- the person joins the military service of a foreign country.
- the person works for a foreign government that is in war with Qatar.
- the person takes up a foreign nationality.

Citizens are allowed to voluntarily give up Qatari citizenship.

== Travel freedom ==
In 2025, Qatari citizens had visa-free or visa on arrival access to 111 countries and territories, ranking the Qatari passport 48th in the world according to the Visa Restrictions Index.
