= Visa policy of Qatar =

Policy on permits required to enter Qatar

Visitors to Qatar must obtain a Hayya e-Visa unless they are citizens from one of the visa-exempt countries or citizens who may obtain a visa on arrival.

All visitors must hold a passport valid for at least 6 months from the date of arrival.

== Visa policy map ==
Visa policy of Qatar Qatar Freedom of movement Free visa on arrival / Hayya eVisa Visa on arrival / Hayya eVisa Hayya eVisa

== Visa exemption ==
=== Ordinary passports ===
Citizens of the following Gulf Cooperation Council countries enjoy freedom of movement in Qatar. They do not require a visa under any circumstances, and are permitted to use a national ID card in lieu of a passport to enter Qatar:

- Bahrain
- Kuwait
- Oman
- Saudi Arabia
- United Arab Emirates

=== Non-ordinary passports ===
Holders of diplomatic or official / service category passports of the following countries may enter Qatar without a visa for up to 30 days (unless otherwise noted):

- Algeria
- Andorra
- Angola
- Argentina^{1}
- Azerbaijan
- Austria^{1}
- Belarus
- Belgium^{1}
- Brazil
- Brunei
- Bulgaria^{1}
- Croatia^{1}
- Colombia
- Cyprus^{D 1}
- Czech Republic^{1}
- Denmark^{1}
- Ecuador
- El Salvador^{D}
- Estonia^{1}
- France^{1}
- Georgia^{1}
- Germany^{1}
- Greece^{1}
- Iceland^{1}
- India
- Indonesia
- Italy^{1}
- Japan
- Jordan^{1}
- Kazakhstan
- Kyrgyzstan^{D}
- Liechtenstein^{1}
- Malta^{1}
- Mauritius^{1}
- Moldova
- Monaco
- Morocco
- Norway^{1}
- Portugal^{1}
- Romania^{1}
- Russia
- San Marino
- Singapore
- South Korea^{1}
- Sri Lanka
- Switzerland^{1}
- Tajikistan
- Tunisia
- Turkey
- Ukraine
- United Kingdom^{1}
- Vatican City

_{D - Diplomatic passports only.}
_{1 - 90 days}

=== Future changes ===
Qatar has signed visa exemption agreements with the following countries, but they have not yet entered into force:

Country	Passports	Agreement signed on
Philippines	Diplomatic, service	22 April 2024
Ghana	Diplomatic, service	March 2022
Dominican Republic	Diplomatic, official, service	January 2022
Nepal	Diplomatic, service	October 2018
Ethiopia	Diplomatic, service	November 2017

== Visa on arrival ==
=== Free visa on arrival ===
Citizens of the following countries may obtain a free tourist visa on arrival for stays up to the duration listed below. However, some nationalities must meet additional criteria in order to be granted a free tourist visa on arrival:

90 days

- European Union member states (except Ireland)

- Antigua and Barbuda
- Argentina
- Armenia
- Bahamas
- Brazil
- Dominican Republic
- Iceland
- Liechtenstein
- Malaysia
- Norway
- Russia
- Serbia
- Seychelles
- South Korea
- Switzerland
- Turkey
- Ukraine^{1}
- United States^{2}

30 days (Note: The stay may be extended for an additional 30 days.)

- Andorra
- Australia
- Azerbaijan
- Bolivia
- Bosnia and Herzegovina
- Brunei
- Canada
- Chile
- China
- Colombia
- Costa Rica
- Cuba
- Ecuador
- Georgia
- Guyana
- Hong Kong
- India^{1}
- Indonesia
- Ireland
- Japan
- Kazakhstan
- Lebanon
- Maldives
- Mexico
- Moldova
- Monaco
- New Zealand
- North Macedonia
- Pakistan^{1} ^{3}
- Panama
- Paraguay
- Peru
- Rwanda
- San Marino
- Singapore
- South Africa
- Suriname
- Thailand^{1}
- United Kingdom
- Uruguay
- Uzbekistan
- Vatican City
- Venezuela

_{1 - Must present a confirmed hotel reservation in one of the designated VOA hotels booked through Discover Qatar for the period of stay.}
_{2 - Citizens of U.S. may receive a visa valid for 2 years, which allows multiple times for up to 90 days each, by paying a visa fee of USD 21 on their initial entry.}
_{3 - Must present a polio vaccination certificate.}

=== Visa on arrival ===
Citizens of the following countries may obtain a visa on arrival. The fee is QR 100, and they must hold passports valid for at least 3 months from the date of arrival, as well as a return or onward ticket.

30 days

- Belarus^{2}
- Falkland Islands^{4}
- French Guiana^{4}
- Iran^{1} ^{3}
- Macau^{4}
- Mauritius^{4}
- Montenegro^{4}
- Taiwan^{4}

_{1 - Must present a confirmed hotel reservation in one of the designated VOA hotels booked through Discover Qatar for the period of stay.}
_{2 - Must present either a credit card or a debit card with a balance of at least USD 1000.}
_{3 - If entering Qatar for tourist purposes, a credit card or at least QAR 5000 in cash must be presented. If entering Qatar for business, an invitation letter from a company certified by the Qatari government must be presented.}
_{4 - Qatar-Oman Joint on-Arrival Tourist Visa only.}

== Electronic visa (e-Visa) ==
Citizens of all countries and territories may obtain a Hayya e-Visa.

=== Hayya Entry Permit ===
There are some types of Hayya Entry Permit:

Hayya Entry Permit	Description
A1	For all citizens of countries and territories.
A2	For GCC residents. They must have a residence permit issued by a GCC country for at least 3 months and their profession must match the one stated on the permit.
A3	Electronic Travel Authorization (ETA). Travelers must have a valid visa or residence permit issued by any Schengen Area member state, Australia, Canada, New Zealand, the United Kingdom or the United States.
A4	For companions of GCC Citizen or Resident. They must have a residence permit issued by a GCC country for at least 3 months and they must be accompanied by the sponsor or his/her first or second degree family member.

== Transit ==
Regardless of nationality, travelers who are in transit through Hamad International Airport do not require a visa if they depart within 24 hours.

On 26 September 2016, the Ministry of the Interior announced the issuance of free transit visas for passengers of any nationality transiting through Hamad International Airport.

Only travellers travelling on Qatar Airways, with layovers between 5 and 96 hours are eligible.

== Visitor statistics ==
Most visitors arriving in Qatar were from the following countries of nationality:

Country	2023	2022	2021	2020	2019	2018	2017	2016	2015
India	419,722	272,987	166,000	92,000	385,148		333,708	340,104	375,910
United Kingdom	159,500	113,001	19,000	35,000	133,418		120,495	132,301	135,645
United States	165,024	107,335	16,000	28,000	127,271		101,144	102,774	93,174
Pakistan	90,242		19,000	18,000	68,216		49,510	49,012	86,670
China	54,693				62,786		45,627	—N/a	—N/a
Germany	168,891			23,000	90,352		44,440	—N/a	—N/a
Egypt	79,079	51,787					43,614	81,283	92,036
Australia	51,148				55,047		42,765	—N/a	—N/a
France	55,387	47,635		16,000	51,007		42,026	—N/a	—N/a
Italy	72,598			33,000	58,656		37,436	—N/a	—N/a
Saudi Arabia	1,022,747	595,066	116,000	12,000			—N/a	949,145	855,555
Bahrain	140,258	84,988					—N/a	135,202	132,913
United Arab Emirates	126,706	66,659					—N/a	134,578	117,575
Oman	136,393	105,685	29,000	17,000			—N/a	98,617	102,332
Kuwait	140,607	101,357	26,000	25,000			—N/a	93,115	91,843
Total	4,054,000	2,540,000	611,000	581,659	2,136,504	1,819,344	2,256,490	2,938,096	2,941,130

== See also ==
- Visa requirements for Qatari citizens
