= Qatari passport =

Passport of the State of Qatar issued to Qatari citizens

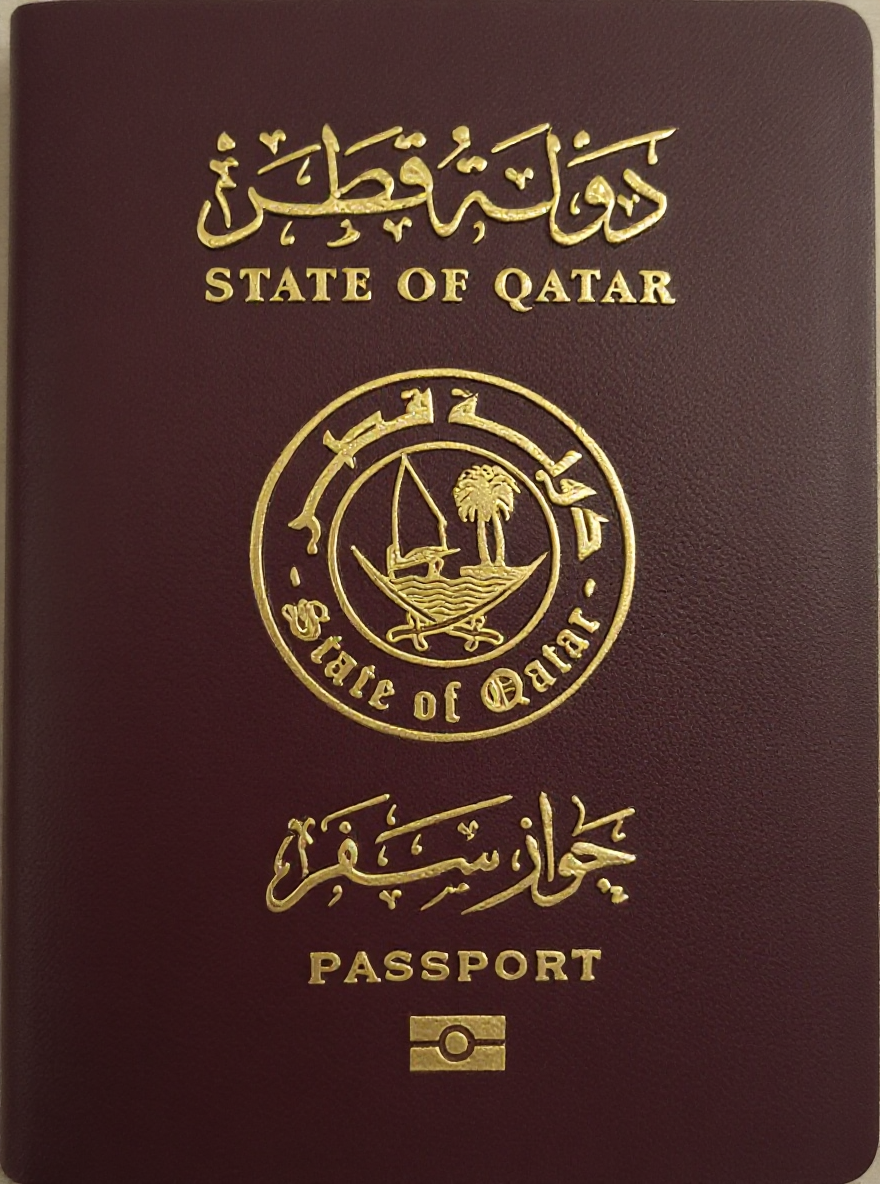
- The front cover of a contemporary Qatari biometric passport.
- Type: Passport
- Issued by: Qatar
- Purpose: Identification
- Eligibility: Qatari citizenship

The Qatari passport (Arabic: جواز السفر القطري) is a passport document issued to citizens of Qatar for international travel. Qatari passports are only issued to full Qatari citizens, with just over 10% of its 3 million population being eligible to hold Qatari passports. Often sportspeople who naturalise in Qatar in order to represent them internationally only get issued "mission passports". These specific kind of passports are treated under Qatari law as being temporary documents with a fixed time period, thus the sportsperson does not actually gain full Qatari citizenship and retains their original nationality.

== Visa requirements ==
As of April 2024, Qatari citizens had visa-free or visa on arrival access to 111 countries and territories, ranking the Qatari passport 47th in terms of travel freedom, according to the Henley Passport Index. As citizens of a GCC member country, citizens of Qatar are permitted free movement within the GCC member states, in a manner similar to that of the European Union.

Countries and territories with visa-free or visa on arrival entry for holders of regular Qatari passports Qatar Freedom of movement Visa free access Visa on arrival eVisa Visa available both on arrival or online Visa required

From 1 December 2024, Qatar has been added to the United States Visa Waiver Program, therefore Qatari passport holders will be able to travel to the United States for a maximum 90 days stay without the requirement of a visa. Qatar has become the first Arab country whose citizens have the right to travel to the United States without a previously arranged travel visa and one of only two Muslim-majority countries, along with citizens of Brunei.

== See also ==
- Visa policy of Qatar
- Qatari nationality law
