= Qatari riyal =

Currency of Qatar

ريال قطري (Arabic)

ISO 4217
- Code: QAR (numeric: 634)
- Subunit: 0.01

Units of account
- Base unit: riyal
- Plural: riyālāt (Arabic)
- Symbol: QR and ر.ق
- Subunit
- 1/100: dirham
- Plural
- dirham: darāhim (Arabic)

Denominations
- Banknotes
- Freq. used: QR 1, QR 5, QR 10, QR 50, QR 100, QR 200, QR 500
- Rarely used: QR 22 (commemorative)
- Coins
- Freq. used: 25, 50 dirhams
- Rarely used: 1, 5, 10 dirhams

Demographics
- User(s): Qatar

Issuance
- Central bank: Qatar Central Bank
- Website: www.qcb.gov.qa

Valuation
- Inflation: 5.42%
- Source: Qatar Central Bank, 2022
- Pegged with: US dollar (USD); US$1 = QR 3.64

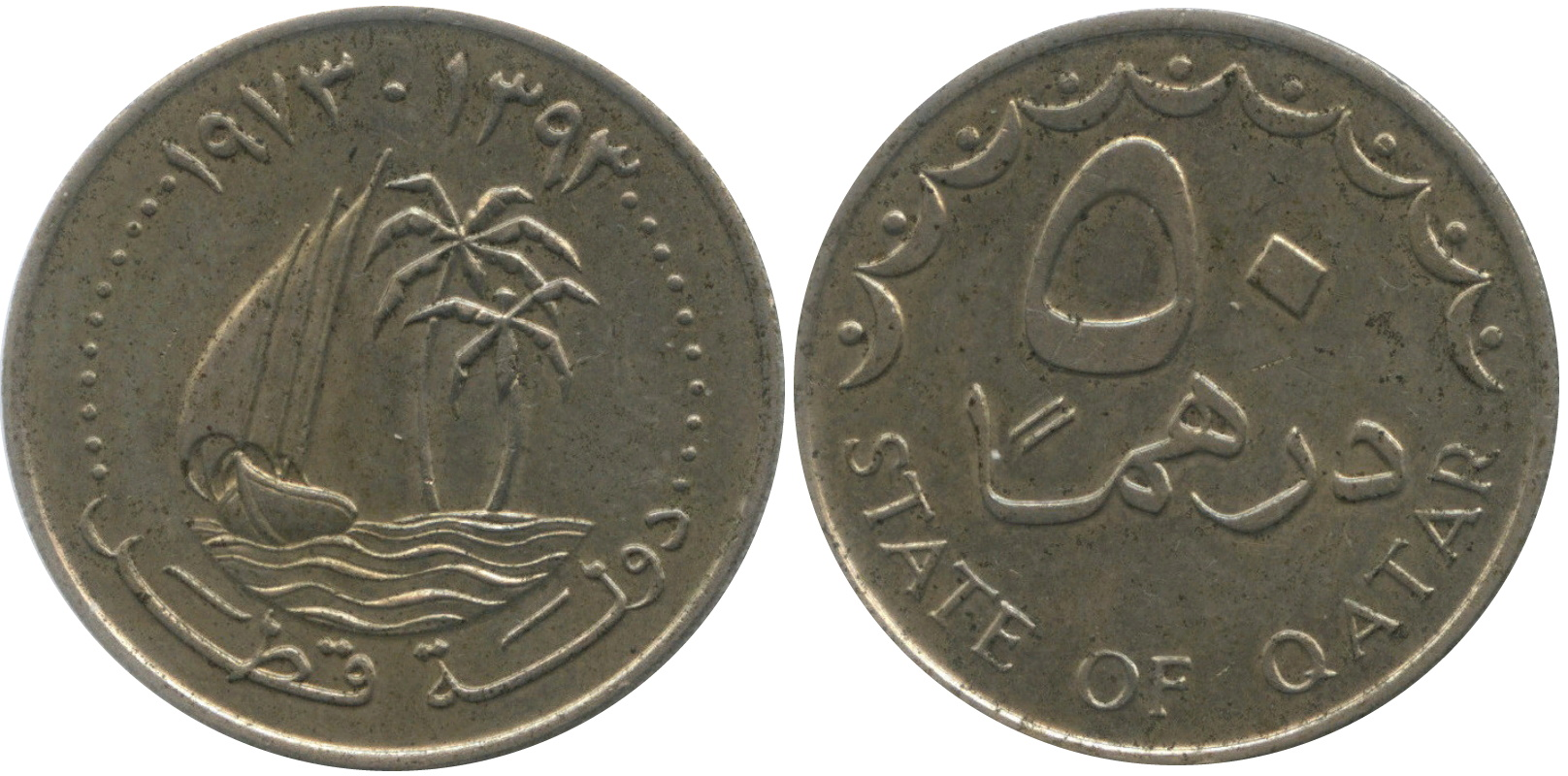
Qatar: 50 dirham, 1973

The Qatari riyal (Arabic: ريال قطري; sign: QR in Latin, ر.ق in Arabic; ISO code: QAR) is the official currency of the State of Qatar. Each riyal, the base unit, is divided into 100 dirhams (Arabic: درهم).

== History ==
Until 1966, Qatar used the Indian rupee as its currency, in the form of Gulf rupees. When India devalued the rupee in 1966, Qatar, along with the other states using the Gulf rupee, chose to introduce its own currency.

Before doing so, Qatar briefly adopted the Saudi riyal, then introduced the Qatar and Dubai riyal following the signing of the Qatar-Dubai Currency Agreement on 21 March 1966. The Saudi riyal was worth 1.065 Gulf rupees, whilst the Qatar and Dubai riyal was equal to the Gulf rupee prior to its devaluation. Initially pegged with sterling at one shilling and six pence (1s. 6d.) per riyal, its value was changed to one shilling and nine pence (1s. 9d.) when sterling was devalued in 1967.

Following Dubai's entry into the United Arab Emirates, Qatar began issuing the Qatari riyal separate from Dubai on 19 May 1973. The old notes continued to circulate in parallel for 90 days, at which time they were withdrawn.

== Coins ==
In 1966, coins were introduced in the name of Qatar and Dubai for 1, 5, 10, 25, and 50 dirhams. In 1973, a new series of coins was introduced in the same sizes and compositions as the earlier pieces but in the name of Qatar only. Only 25 and 50 dirham coins are now circulated, although smaller coins remain legal tender.

Image		Value	Diameter	Mass	Composition	Edge	Obverse	Reverse	Year of	
Obverse	Reverse	Value	Diameter	Mass	Composition	Edge	Obverse	Reverse	first minted	withdrawal
		1 dirham	15 mm	1.4 g	Copper-clad Steel	Smooth	Mintage dates both the Gregorian and Lunar Hijri calendars on top, the Emblem of Qatar at the center, and the lettering: "دولة قطر" in the bottom.	The lettering "ONE DIRHAM", below that is the value (Older versions use Eastern Arabic numerals while newer ones use Western Arabic numerals), below that is the lettering "درهم", and below that is the lettering "STATE OF QATAR"	1973	
		5 dirhams	22 mm	2.83 g	Copper-clad Steel	Smooth	Mintage dates in both the Gregorian and Lunar Hijri calendars on top, the Emblem of Qatar at the center, and the lettering: "دولة قطر" in the bottom.	The lettering "FIVE DIRHAMS", below that is the value (Older versions use Eastern Arabic numerals while newer ones use Western Arabic numerals), below that is the lettering "دراهم", and below that is the lettering "STATE OF QATAR"	1973	
		10 dirhams	27 mm	7.52 g	Copper-clad Steel	Smooth	Mintage dates in both the Gregorian and Lunar Hijri calendars on top, the Emblem of Qatar at the center, and the lettering: "دولة قطر" in the bottom.	The lettering "TEN DIRHAMS", below that is the value (Older versions use Eastern Arabic numerals while newer ones use Western Arabic numerals), below that is the lettering "دراهم", and below that is the lettering "STATE OF QATAR"	1973	
		25 dirhams	20 mm	3.2 g	Nickel-clad Steel	Reeded	Mintage dates in both the Gregorian and Lunar Hijri calendars on top, the Emblem of Qatar at the center, and the lettering: "دولة قطر" in the bottom.	The lettering "TWENTY FIVE DIRHAMS", below that is the value (Older versions use Eastern Arabic numerals while newer ones use Western Arabic numerals), below that is the lettering "درهماً", and below that is the lettering "STATE OF QATAR"	1973	
		50 dirhams	25 mm	5.8 g	Nickel-clad Steel	Reeded	Mintage dates in both the Gregorian and Lunar Hijri calendars on top, the Emblem of Qatar at the center, and the lettering: "دولة قطر" in the bottom.	The lettering "FIFTY DIRHAMS", below that is the value (Older versions use Eastern Arabic numerals while newer ones use Western Arabic numerals), below that is the lettering "درهماً", and below that is the lettering "STATE OF QATAR"	1973	

== Banknotes ==
On September 18, 1966, the Qatar & Dubai Currency Board introduced notes for 1, 5, 10, 25, 50, and 100 riyals. These were replaced on 19 May 1973 by notes of the Qatar Monetary Agency in denominations of 1, 5, 10, 100, and 500 riyals; a 50 riyal note was issued in 1976. The Qatar Central Bank was established by decree 15 on 5 August 1973. All coins and notes issued by the Qatar Monetary Agency became the property of the bank but continued to circulate for several years. In 2003, the Fourth Series was issued and on September 26, 2007, the revised of 100 and 500 riyal was issued, follow the revised of the 1, 5, 10, 50 on September 15, 2008. On December 13, 2020, the Qatar Central Bank issued its fifth series of banknotes for circulation. Included in this series is the 200 riyal banknote. The front side of the notes share a common design based on traditional geometric patterns, the Flag of Qatar, Qatari flora and a gate representing historic Qatari architecture. The fifth series was revised since 2025 to improve the banknotes, starting from the 1 riyal banknote on July 2, 2025.

Qatar issued a commemorative 22 riyal note for the 2022 FIFA World Cup.

First series (1973–76)
Image		Value	Main Color	Description		Date of	
Obverse	Reverse	Value	Main Color	Obverse	Reverse	Issue	Withdrawn
		QR 1	Red	Coat of arms of Qatar	Port of Doha	May 19, 1973	Unknown
		QR 5	Brown and Purple	Coat of arms of Qatar	National museum	May 19, 1973	Unknown
		QR 10	Green	Coat of arms of Qatar	Qatar Monetary Agency building	May 19, 1973	Unknown
		QR 50	Blue	Coat of arms of Qatar	Oil rig	1976	Unknown
		QR 100	Olive Green	Coat of arms of Qatar	Ministry of Finance	May 19, 1973	Unknown
		QR 500	Olive Green	Coat of arms of Qatar	Mosque of the Sheikhs	May 19, 1973	Unknown

Second series (1981)
Image		Value	Main Color	Description		Date of	
Obverse	Reverse	Value	Main Color	Obverse	Reverse	Issue	Withdrawn
		QR 1	Brown	Coat of arms of Qatar	Doha (Then changed to Dhow, Ministry of Finance, Emir's palace since 1985)	July 7, 1981	Unknown
		QR 5	Purple, Red, Green and Blue	Coat of arms of Qatar	Sheep	July 7, 1981	Unknown
		QR 10	Green and Yellow	Coat of arms of Qatar	National museum	July 7, 1981	Unknown
		QR 50	Blue	Coat of arms of Qatar	Furnace in steel factory	July 7, 1981	Unknown
		QR 100	Olive Green	Coat of arms of Qatar	Qatar Central Bank building	July 7, 1981	Unknown
		QR 500	Green and Blue	Coat of arms of Qatar	Oil rig	July 7, 1981	Unknown

Third series (1996)
Image		Value	Main Color	Description		Date of	
Obverse	Reverse	Value	Main Color	Obverse	Reverse	Issue	Withdrawn
		QR 1	Brown	Coat of arms of Qatar	Dhow, Ministry of Finance, Emir's palace	June 22, 1996	Unknown
		QR 5	Purple, Red, Green and Blue	Coat of arms of Qatar	Sheep	June 22, 1996	Unknown
		QR 10	Green and Yellow	Coat of arms of Qatar	National museum	June 22, 1996	Unknown
		QR 50	Blue	Coat of arms of Qatar	Furnace in steel factory	June 22, 1996	Unknown
		QR 100	Olive Green	Coat of arms of Qatar	Qatar Central Bank building	June 22, 1996	Unknown
		QR 500	Green and Blue	Coat of arms of Qatar	Oil rig	June 22, 1996	Unknown

Fourth series (2003)
Image		Value	Main Color	Description		Date of	
Obverse	Reverse	Value	Main Color	Obverse	Reverse	Issue	Withdrawn
		QR 1	Gray & Blue	Coat of arms of Qatar	A European bee-eater, a crested lark, and a kentish plover.	June 15, 2003	July 1, 2021
		QR 5	Green	Coat of arms of Qatar	National Museum of Qatar, Camel, oryxes	June 15, 2003	July 1, 2021
		QR 10	Orange	Coat of arms of Qatar	Dhow, Sand Dunes	June 15, 2003	July 1, 2021
		QR 50	Pink	Coat of arms of Qatar	The Pearl Monument and a view of the Qatar Central Bank building	June 15, 2003	July 1, 2021
		QR 100	Green & Gold	Coat of arms of Qatar	Old Mosque and Al-Shaqab Institute	June 15, 2003	June 15, 2009
		QR 500	Blue	Coat of arms of Qatar	Falcon, with a view of the Amiri Diwan of Qatar which serves as the government building for the State of Qatar	June 15, 2003	June 15, 2009

Revised Fourth series (2007-2008)
Image		Value	Main Color	Description		Date of	
Obverse	Reverse	Value	Main Color	Obverse	Reverse	Issue	Withdrawn
		QR 1	Gray & Blue	Coat of arms of Qatar	A European bee-eater, a crested lark, and a kentish plover.	September 15, 2008	July 1, 2021
		QR 5	Green	Coat of arms of Qatar	National Museum of Qatar, Camel, oryxes	September 15, 2008	July 1, 2021
		QR 10	Orange	Coat of arms of Qatar	Dhow, Sand Dunes	September 15, 2008	July 1, 2021
		QR 50	Pink	Coat of arms of Qatar	The Pearl Monument and a view of the Qatar Central Bank building	September 15, 2008	July 1, 2021
		QR 100	Green & Gold	Coat of arms of Qatar	Old Mosque and Al-Shaqab Institute	September 26, 2007	July 1, 2021
		QR 500	Blue	Coat of arms of Qatar	Falcon, with a view of the Amiri Diwan of Qatar which serves as the government building for the State of Qatar	September 26, 2007	July 1, 2021

Fifth series (2020)
Image		Value	Main Color	Description		Date of	
Obverse	Reverse	Value	Main Color	Obverse	Reverse	Issue	Withdrawn
		QR 1	Green	Flag of Qatar; Dreama flower; gate representing historical Qatari architecture	Traditional Dhow (Bateel) and the Oyster and Pearl Monument	December 18, 2020	Current
		QR 5	Brown	Flag of Qatar; Dreama flower; gate representing historical Qatari architecture	Traditional desert scene comprising fauna (Arab horses, Camel, Oryxes), flora (Al Qataf) and ‘hair tent (buryuut hajar)	December 18, 2020	Current
		QR 10	Blue	Flag of Qatar; Dreama flower; gate representing historical Qatari architecture	Lusail Stadium, Torch Tower (Aspire Zone), Sidra Medicine and Education City (Qatar Foundation)	December 18, 2020	Current
		QR 50	Red	Flag of Qatar; Dreama flower; gate representing historical Qatari architecture	Qatar Central Bank building and Ministry of Finance building	December 18, 2020	Current
		QR 100	Cyan	Flag of Qatar; Dreama flower; gate representing historical Qatari architecture	Abu Al Qubaib Mosque	December 18, 2020	Current
		QR 200	Orange	Flag of Qatar; Dreama flower; gate representing historical Qatari architecture	Palace of Sheikh Abdullah bin Jassim Al Thani, Qatar National Museum and Museum of Islamic Art	December 18, 2020	Current
		QR 500	Violet	Flag of Qatar; Dreama flower; gate representing historical Qatari architecture	Ras Laffan LNG refinery and LNG canter ship	December 18, 2020	Current

Commemorative Banknotes
Image		Value	Main Color	Description		Date of	
Obverse	Reverse	Value	Main Color	Obverse	Reverse	Issue	Withdrawn
		QR 22	Brown, green, blue, orange, and purple	Doha, Lusail Stadium	Tower, dhow, Al Bayt Stadium, globe	November 9, 2022	Current

Fifth series (revised, 2025–present)
Image		Value	Main Color	Description		Date of	
Obverse	Reverse	Value	Main Color	Obverse	Reverse	Issue	Withdrawn
		QR 1	Green	Flag of Qatar; Dreama flower; gate representing historical Qatari architecture	Traditional Dhow (Bateel) and the Oyster and Pearl Monument	July 2, 2025	Current

== Fixed exchange rate ==
The Qatari riyal is pegged to the US dollar at a fixed exchange rate of US$1 = QR 3.64. This rate was enshrined into Qatari law by Royal Decree No.34 of 2001, signed by Hamad bin Khalifa Al Thani, Emir of Qatar, on 9 July 2001.

Article (1) states that the Qatari riyal exchange rate shall be pegged against the US dollar at QR 3.64, and sets upper and lower limits of QR 3.6415 and QR 3.6385 for the Qatar Central Bank's purchase and sale of dollars with banks operating in Qatar. Article (2) provides the Qatar Central Bank with the authority to determine the volume and the time of sale of US dollars and the associated conditions of such sales and payments. Article (3) cancels the earlier Royal Decree No.60 of 1975, by which the riyal was officially pegged to the IMF's special drawing rights (SDRs).

Current QAR exchange rates
From Google Finance:	AUD CAD CHF CNY EUR GBP HKD JPY USD INR KRW
From Yahoo! Finance:	AUD CAD CHF CNY EUR GBP HKD JPY USD INR KRW
From XE.com:	AUD CAD CHF CNY EUR GBP HKD JPY USD INR KRW
From OANDA:	AUD CAD CHF CNY EUR GBP HKD JPY USD INR KRW

Note: Rates obtained from these websites may contradict with pegged rate mentioned above

=== Effect of the 2017 Qatar diplomatic crisis ===
In response to the 2017 Qatar diplomatic crisis, banks in the countries blockading Qatar had to stop trading with Qatari banks. This led to a fall in liquidity offshore and a move away from the fixed exchange rate outside of Qatar, with up to QR 3.81 being required to buy 1 US dollar in late June 2017, a situation that continued until December 2017.

This also led to cessation of trading of Qatari banknotes outside of Qatar with certain banks in certain countries such as the UK.

Within Qatar itself, however, the Central Bank of Qatar has continued to buy and sell US dollars at the fixed rate.

== See also ==
- Cooperation Council for the Arab States of the Gulf
- Economy of Qatar
- Qatar Central Bank

Preceded by: Saudi riyal Reason: delivery of local currency Ratio: 1.065 Qatari and Dubai riyal = 1 Saudi riyal, or 1 Qatari and Dubai riyal = 1 pre-devalued Gulf rupee	Currency of Qatar; 1966 – 1973	Succeeded by: Qatari riyal Reason: withdrawal of Dubai from common currency Ratio: at par
Preceded by: Saudi riyal Reason: delivery of local currency Ratio: 1.065 Qatari and Dubai riyal = 1 Saudi riyal, or 1 Qatari and Dubai riyal = 1 pre-devalued Gulf rupee	Currency of Trucial States except for Abu Dhabi; 1966 – 1973	Succeeded by: United Arab Emirates dirham Reason: formed United Arab Emirates (in 1971); Ratio: at par
Preceded by: Qatari and Dubai riyal Reason: withdrawal of Dubai from common currency Ratio: at par	Currency of Qatar; 1973 –	
