= Embassy of the United Arab Emirates, Doha =

Diplomatic mission of the United Arab Emirates to Qatar

Embassy of the United Arab Emirates in Doha
- Emblem of the United Arab Emirates
- Location: Doha, Qatar
- Address: Diplomatic Area, West Bay, P.O. Box 3099
- Coordinates: 25°19′42.5″N 51°32′16.3″E
- Ambassador: Zayed bin Khalifa bin Sultan Al Nahyan (since September 2023)
- Website: www.mofa.gov.ae/en/missions/doha

The Embassy of the United Arab Emirates in Doha is the diplomatic mission of the United Arab Emirates (UAE) to the State of Qatar. It is located in the Diplomatic Area of West Bay, Doha.

The current ambassador, Sheikh Zayed bin Khalifa bin Sultan Al Nahyan, has held the post since September 2023.

== History ==
The UAE and Qatar have shared diplomatic relations since the formation of the UAE in 1971. However, on 5 June 2017, as part of the Qatar diplomatic crisis, the UAE cut diplomatic relations with Qatar.

On 6 January 2021, Qatar and the UAE agreed to fully restore diplomatic ties.

On 19 June 2023, the Qatari embassy in Abu Dhabi, a consulate in Dubai, and the Emirati embassy in Doha reopened and resumed work.

== Ambassador ==
Zayed bin Khalifa bin Sultan Al-Nahyan presented his credentials to Tamim bin Hamad Al Thani, the emir of Qatar, in September 2023. Prior to his appointment in Qatar, the ambassador held various advisory positions in the government.

== See also ==
- Foreign relations of the United Arab Emirates
- Foreign relations of Qatar
- List of diplomatic missions of the United Arab Emirates
- List of diplomatic missions in Qatar
