= Foreign relations of Qatar =

Foreign relations of Qatar are conducted through its Ministry of Foreign Affairs. Arab states were among the first to recognize Qatar, and the country gained admittance to the United Nations and the Arab League after achieving independence in 1971. The country was an early member of OPEC and a founding member of the Gulf Cooperation Council (GCC). Diplomatic missions to Qatar are based in its capital, Doha.

Qatar's regional relations and foreign policies are characterized by a strategy of balancing and alliance building among regional and great powers. It maintains an independent foreign policy and engages in regional balancing to secure its strategic priorities and to have recognition on the regional and international level. As a small state in the gulf, Qatar has an "open-door" foreign policy in which Qatar maintains ties with all parties and regional players in the region, including organizations such as Taliban and Hamas. However, Washington Institute published a report in August 2021 stating that Qatar's connections with the Taliban have made the country a potential contact for regions seeking negotiations with Afghanistan. Qatar has also been key to negotiating cease-fires between Israel and Hamas that have restored calm after four wars, last seen in 2021. At the same time, Qatar was one of the main supporters of Hamas, both economically and in terms of propaganda. Qatar used to express support for movements associated with the Muslim Brotherhood.

== Multilateral relations ==
Sheikh Hamad bin Khalifa Al Thani, the emir of Qatar from 1995 to 2013, helped establish Qatar's reputation as an influential player in Middle East politics. The first major move in this regard was the founding of Al Jazeera, a state-owned news media company.

Qatar has also cultivated close relationships with Western powers, particularly the United States and the United Kingdom. Al Udeid Air Base hosts American and British air forces. Qatar has invested extensively in London real estate, and the country has also made donations to prominent research centers in the United States. At the same time, Qatar maintains ties to Western adversaries, including Iran, Hamas, the Muslim Brotherhood, and extremist elements in Syria. Although according to a report by The Economist in December 2021, Qatar has modified its anti-Islamist policies and demanded Brotherhood activists leave.

In an attempt to quell mounting criticism of the human rights of foreign workers in the country, Qatar has announced and enacted many steps of reform, including announcing multiple times that the Kafala system was effectively abolished. Despite these steps, in their reports for the year 2025 both Human Rights Watch and Amnesty International have found that foreign labourers in Qatar continue to face widespread abuses under a "restrictive" and "exploitative" Kafala system. The Guardian noted that while some of these reforms won praise from FIFA, the UN and the International Labour Organization, most of the foreign workers they spoke with said that little had changed for them in practice.

It is also one of the few countries in which citizens do not have to pay any taxes.

Qatar is a strategic ally of China, with relationship between the two countries growing stronger. Qatar is a member of Organisation of Islamic Cooperation, Gulf Cooperation Council, OPEC and the Council of Arab Economic Unity.

=== Regional relations ===
In September 2014. QFFD contributed in enhancing stability for Syrian refugees. Qatar Charity facilitated access to quality education through the rehabilitation of 6 Formal schools in Turkey, Gaziantep, Urfa, Kilis, targeting a total number of 13,540 beneficiaries and 12,860 girls and boys.

On 10 July 2017, according to documents obtained by Al Arabiya, Qatar agreed to quit supporting the Muslim Brotherhood. In order to avoid undermining relations with the Gulf, it also removed non-citizens from Qatar and refused to provide shelter to anyone from a GCC nation.

On 27 March 2022, The United Nations Office of Counter-Terrorism (UNOCT) and Qatar on their fourth high-level strategic discussion, discussed strategic priorities and worked together to ensure that the UN effectively supports member states in their efforts to combat terrorism. Out of a total of 35 other contributors, the state of Qatar is the second greatest contributor to the UN trust fund for counter-terrorism.

Some financial economists have interpreted the 2014 Saudi-Qatari rift as the tangible political sign of a growing economic rivalry between oil and natural gas producers, which could "have deep and long-lasting consequences" beyond the Middle East.

In March 2014 Qatar made overtures to Oman in order to counteract the influence of Saudi Arabia on politics in the region.

In May 2017, an alleged hack of state media led to stories quoting the Emir as enquiring US resentment towards Iran and remarking on Hamas. Doha reported it as false and gave no indication on where it originated. However, news organizations in the region reported the emir's comments as fact. This led to Saudi Arabia, UAE, Egypt and Bahrain cutting diplomatic ties with Qatar on 5 June 2017.

Qatar voiced support for the Turkish invasion of northern Syria aimed at ousting U.S.-backed Syrian Kurds from the enclave of Afrin. Spokeswoman of Ministry of Foreign Affairs, Lulwah Rashif Al-Khater said that: "The launching of the Turkish military operation last Saturday was motivated by legitimate concerns related to its national security and the security of its borders, in addition to protecting Syria's territorial integrity from the danger of secession. Turkey, a NATO member, has always been a stabilizing factor in the region."

In 2022, four people were arrested for corruption in the European Parliament. This came to be known as the Qatar corruption scandal at the European Parliament.

In mid-March 2024, the Emir of Qatar, HH Sheikh Tamim bin Hamad Al-Thani and President of the European Council, HE Charles Michel, discussed about enhancing cooperation between Qatar and the European Union, as well as addressing key regional and global issues, with specific focus on the situation in the Gaza Strip and the Occupied Palestinian Territories.

=== Peace brokering and peacekeeping activities ===
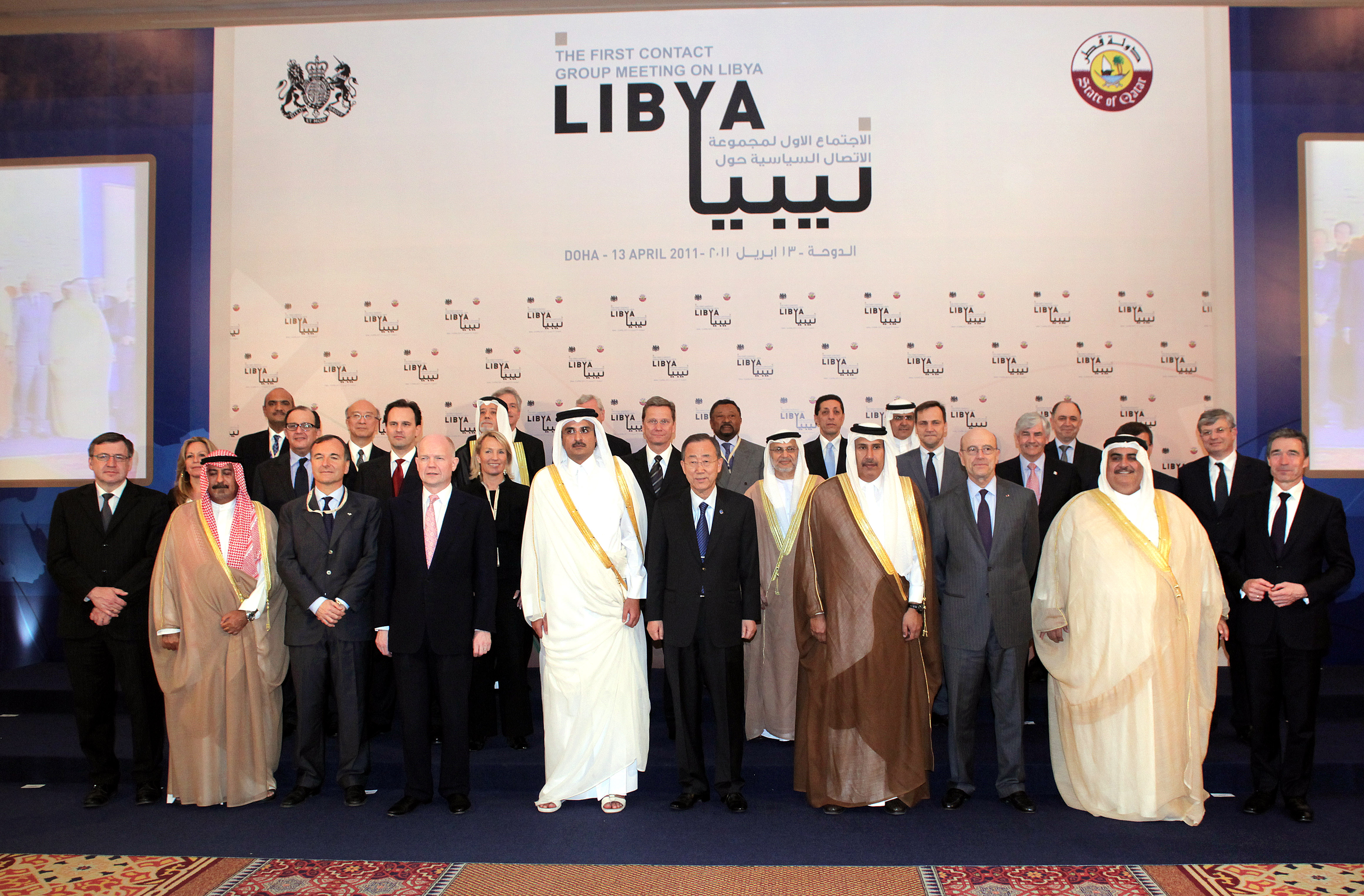
The First Contact Group Meeting on Libya was held in Doha, Qatar on 3 April 2011

The onset of the Arab Spring in January 2011 complicated Qatar's ability to mediate having forced Gulf leaders to side with revolutionaries or the longstanding autocratic regimes. Sheikh Hamad stated in that Qatar would support the uprisings, a position that clashed with neighboring Saudi Arabia and the United Arab Emirates. Qatar provided extensive support, in funding and weapons, to Libyan revolutionaries and aided in the removal of Muammar Gaddafi by mobilising Arab support behind NATO airstrikes. In Egypt, Qatar supported President Mohamed Morsi and has suffered from strained relations with President Abdel Fattah el-Sisi following Morsi's removal.

In Syria, Qatar has provided arms and funding to various opposition groups. Other discoveries from the research claimed that Qatar supported the US against the Assad government. Additionally, the nation supported efforts to mediate a conflict-ending political transition in Syria. In March 2021, Qatar, Russia, and Turkey also started a different track of talks on the Syrian peace process.

According to the Royal United Services Institute, Qatar plays an important role in Syria and Iraq as an interlocutor between Western powers and resistant groups that cannot be engaged directly. This role is consistent with Qatar's efforts as an interlocutor with the Taliban in Afghanistan, hosting a small embassy in Doha where US officials are able to meet with the Taliban behind closed doors.

Prior to the abdication of Emir Sheikh Hamad, Qatar's mediation was fronted by the Qatari Minister of State for Foreign Affairs Ahmad Abdullah Al Mahmud. On 4 May 2009, the Qatari Minister of State for Foreign Affairs Ahmad Abdullah Al Mahmud announced that Chad and Sudan had agreed to end hostilities against each other and to normalize relations during Qatari-mediated talks in Doha; however the agreement quickly broke down. Qatar also brokered an agreement between the Sudanese government and the strongest Darfur rebel group, the Justice and Equality Movement, in Doha in February 2010. The agreement fell apart in May 2010 and the conflict is ongoing.

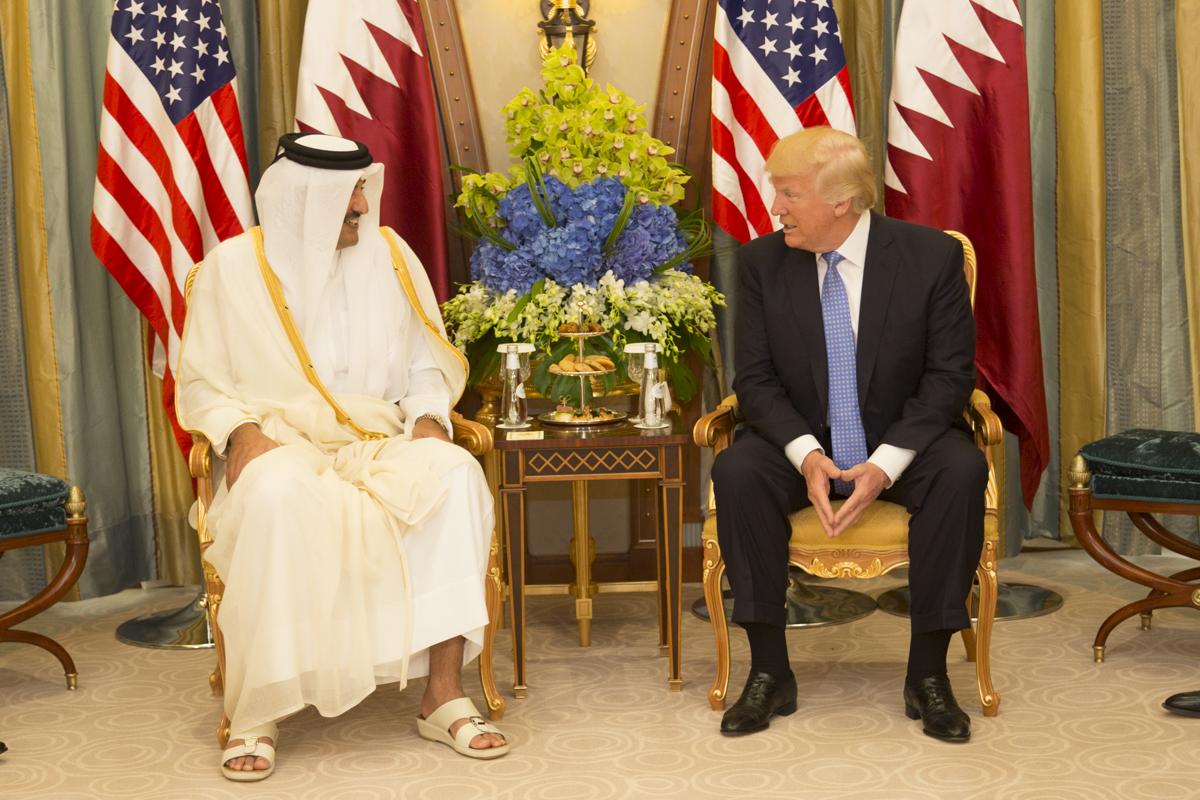
U.S. President Donald Trump with the Emir of Qatar Tamim bin Hamad Al Thani, May 2017

Qatar hosted a donors conference to help rebuild war-ravaged Darfur in April 2013.

In June 2010, Qatari peacekeeping forces deployed in the disputed Ras Doumeira area on the border between Djibouti and Eritrea after the latter withdrew from the area. The intention was to help start bilateral negotiations and solve the territorial dispute which had turned violent. Qatar withdrew its 450 troops from the Djibouti-Eritrea border in June 2017 after the two countries severed ties with Qatar.

On 1 February 2023, in an interview, Qatar's foreign minister, Sheikh Mohammed bin Abdulrahman Al-Thani, stated that his country is actively utilizing its established communication channels with both Washington and Tehran in order to foster a greater alignment of their respective perspectives.

In September 2023, it was reported that Iran expressed its readiness to execute a Qatar-mediated agreement with the United States. The Iranian foreign minister made this announcement on 14 September 2023. According to the terms of the agreement, both Washington and Tehran would release five prisoners, while $6 billion worth of Iranian assets held in South Korea would be released.

The broad outlines of the U.S.-Iran deal, which pertain to the potential release of U.S. citizens detained by Iran, were publicly disclosed on 10 August. As part of this agreement, it has been proposed that the funds be transferred to banks in Qatar while simultaneously releasing five Iranians who are currently held in the United States.

In June, it was reported that secret talks took place between Venezuela and the United States, with Qatar serving as the host for these discussions. Qatar has been known for its significant involvement in supporting the United States during delicate negotiations, which notably encompassed a recent prisoner exchange with Iran and facilitated backchannel communications between the U.S. and the Taliban.

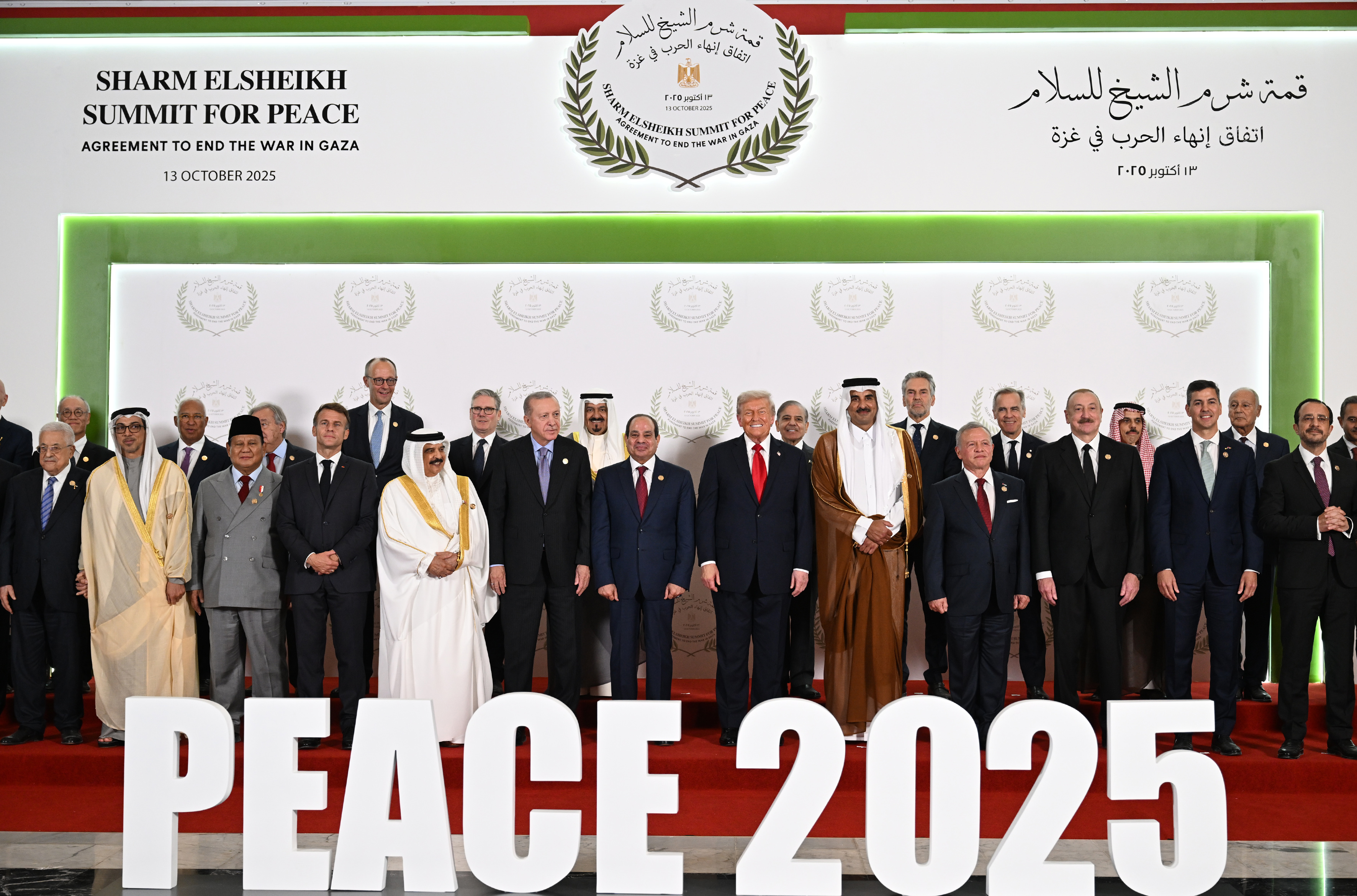
Qatari Emir Tamim bin Hamad Al Thani at the Gaza peace summit in Egypt, 13 October 2025

On 7 October 2023, Israel and Hamas started an extensive armed conflict. Due to its escalation, On 9 October 2023, Qatari mediators made urgent talks to attempt to arrange the release of 36 Palestinian women and children from Israeli prisons in exchange for the release of Israeli women and children held by the militant group that were being detained in Gaza. Positive progress is being made in the ongoing negotiations, which Qatar has been undertaking in collaboration with the United States. Qatar has played a crucial role in facilitating the release of American and Australian hostages who were stranded in Israel and Palestine.

In October 2023, Qatar's mediation efforts led to the reunion of four Ukrainian children with their families. By December 2023, an additional six Ukrainian children were scheduled to be repatriated from Russia to Ukraine under a Qatar-brokered agreement. In February 2024, a third group of 11 children was successfully returned to their Ukrainian families with the assistance of Qatar's mediation. On 21 March 2024, a new batch of children exchange between Moscow and Kyiv took place at Qatar's Embassy in Moscow, facilitated by Qatar and attended by Ambassador Sheikh Ahmed bin Nasser bin Jassim Al Thani, as confirmed by Russian Children's Ombudswoman Maria Lvova-Belova. Furthermore, the ambassador Sheikh Ahmed expressed gratitude to Russian President Vladimir Putin and Qatari Emir Sheikh Tamim bin Hamad Al Thani for their support throughout this process.

Qatar has actively extended its role as a global mediator under the leadership of Prime Minister Sheikh Mohammed bin Abdulrahman Al Thani. In May 2025 interview with The Washington Post, Sheikh Mohammed emphasized Qatar’s “technocratic” approach to negotiations, citing successful mediation in high‑profile conflicts such as the release of over 130 hostages from Gaza, talks involving Hamas and Israel, negotiations in Afghanistan and the war in Ukraine, and reunification of Ukrainian children taken to Russia.

=== Cultural and religious activities ===
Qatar is an Islamic state with multi-religious minorities like most of the Persian Gulf countries with waves of migration over the last 30 years. The official state religion is Wahhabi Sunni Islam. The community is made up of Sunni and Shi'a Muslims, Christians, Hindus, and small groups of Buddhists and Baha'is. Muslims form 65.5% of the Qatari population, followed by Hindus at 15.4%, Christians at 14.2%, Buddhists at 3.3% and the rest 1.9% of the population follow other religions or are unaffiliated. Qatar is also home to numerous other religions mostly from the Middle East and Asia.

=== Foreign aid ===
Qatar's international aid program has expanded dramatically since the beginning of 2010, and focuses heavily on the Arab world, most notably in the humanitarian crises in Syria and Gaza.

According to the UN OCHA's Financial Tracking Service, Qatar's international aid increased from less than $10 million annually in the pre-Arab Spring period to the hundreds of millions following the event.

For example, in 2012, according to the Qatari Ministry of Foreign Affairs, the country donated more than QAR3 billion (or c. £524 million) through governmental and non-governmental aid to nearly 100 countries across the globe.

Qatari leadership has since pledged publicly to reduce suffering of victims and to achieve and support global partnerships for the achievement of foreign countries' Millennium Development Goals. The state is engaged in investments in a wide range of humanitarian and developmental sectors. Qatar pledged $50 million in support to United Nations humanitarian response plan as well as the regional refugee plan for Sudan, during a donor conference in Geneva on 19 June 2023. "Based on our fraternal responsibility and our moral and human duty towards our brothers in Sudan, and as a continuation of our continuous humanitarian and development efforts in brotherly Sudan, we announce the State of Qatar's pledge of $50 million to support the efforts of the Humanitarian Response Plan and the Regional Refugee Plan," Sheikh Mohammed bin Abdulrahman Al Thani announced.

On 24 September 2023, Qatar dispatched a significant quantity of humanitarian and relief aid, amounting to 58 tonnes, to assist the city of Derna in Libya, which had been severely impacted by flooding. This recent contribution elevates the total amount of aid provided by Qatar to support those affected by the floods to an impressive 267 tonnes. Aid typically encompasses a range of essential provisions, including but not limited to shelter essentials, electricity generators, food, and medical commodities.

Recently, Qatar Charity (QC) launched the 'Libya Appeal' campaign, aimed at providing aid to the Libyan population grappling with the consequences of severe floods. These floods have resulted in the loss of numerous lives and the displacement of a significant number of individuals.

Sheikh Tamim Bin Hamad Al Thani also conveyed his heartfelt condolences to the victims affected by the catastrophic floods in Libya through a message posted on the social media platform Twitter. "I extend to our brothers in Libya my sincere condolences and sympathy for the victims of the catastrophic floods, and we in Qatar declare our complete solidarity with the Libyan people to overcome this painful ordeal, and we ask God to have mercy on the dead, bring back the missing, and heal the wounded,". He wrote.

== Diplomatic relations ==
List of countries which Qatar maintains diplomatic relations with:

#	Country	Date
1	Saudi Arabia	12 October 1971
2	Iran	16 October 1971
3	Egypt	1 November 1971
4	Kuwait	15 December 1971
5	Bahrain	1971
6	France	5 January 1972
7	Syria	19 January 1972
8	Iraq	6 March 1972
9	United States	19 March 1972
10	Lebanon	11 April 1972
11	India	12 April 1972
12	Sudan	30 April 1972
13	Japan	9 May 1972
14	Jordan	18 May 1972
15	Yemen	20 May 1972
16	United Kingdom	24 May 1972
17	Netherlands	15 June 1972
18	Tunisia	20 June 1972
19	Oman	27 June 1972
20	Morocco	4 September 1972
21	Chad	13 December 1972
22	Pakistan	16 December 1972
23	Spain	22 December 1972
24	Germany	15 January 1973
25	Afghanistan	16 January 1973
26	Italy	15 February 1973
27	Austria	5 March 1973
28	Mauritania	16 March 1973
29	Turkey	20 March 1973
30	Sweden	29 March 1973
31	Venezuela	24 May 1973
32	Senegal	5 June 1973
33	Norway	9 June 1973
34	Algeria	18 July 1973
35	Switzerland	12 September 1973
36	Belgium	21 November 1973
37	Greece	November 1973
38	Canada	2 February 1974
39	Somalia	3 February 1974
40	Finland	1 April 1974
41	South Korea	18 April 1974
42	Brazil	20 May 1974
43	Argentina	15 June 1974
44	Malaysia	26 June 1974
45	Ireland	September 1974
46	Burundi	26 October 1974
47	Denmark	15 December 1974
48	Cameroon	27 February 1975
49	Malta	18 June 1975
50	Ecuador	20 June 1975
51	Bangladesh	25 June 1975
52	Mexico	30 June 1975
53	Libya	19 November 1975
54	Uganda	1975
55	United Arab Emirates	1975
56	Sri Lanka	13 June 1976
57	Indonesia	10 November 1976
58	Nepal	21 January 1977
59	Mali	1977
60	Gambia	22 January 1978
61	Gabon	25 November 1979
62	Australia	1 May 1980
63	Luxembourg	3 May 1980
64	Thailand	7 August 1980
65	Sierra Leone	1980
66	Philippines	5 May 1981
67	Ghana	25 July 1981
68	Portugal	1 May 1982
69	Chile	9 June 1982
70	Zambia	25 June 1982
71	Niger	14 September 1982
72	Tanzania	13 December 1982
73	Seychelles	7 April 1984
74	Maldives	26 May 1984
75	New Zealand	10 November 1984
76	Singapore	24 November 1984
—	Comoros (suspended)	1984
77	Central African Republic	1 August 1985
78	Mauritius	1986
79	Uruguay	16 March 1987
80	Guinea	1 January 1988
81	China	9 July 1988
82	Russia	1 August 1988
83	Burkina Faso	23 October 1988
—	State of Palestine	7 January 1989
84	Serbia	24 August 1989
85	Poland	16 October 1989
86	Peru	7 November 1989
87	Cuba	13 December 1989
88	Czech Republic	14 October 1990
89	Bulgaria	16 October 1990
90	Hungary	18 October 1990
91	Romania	22 October 1990
92	Nicaragua	15 August 1991
93	Brunei	2 October 1991
94	Guinea-Bissau	27 July 1992
95	Albania	26 August 1992
96	Lithuania	25 November 1992
97	Croatia	5 December 1992
98	Slovenia	15 December 1992
99	Slovakia	1 January 1993
100	North Korea	11 January 1993
101	Bosnia and Herzegovina	22 January 1993
102	Vietnam	8 February 1993
103	Georgia	16 March 1993
104	Ukraine	13 April 1993
105	Kazakhstan	1 July 1993
106	Eritrea	5 July 1993
107	South Africa	10 May 1994
108	Mozambique	11 June 1994
109	Ivory Coast	29 July 1994
110	Azerbaijan	14 September 1994
111	Tajikistan	13 December 1994
112	Ethiopia	16 July 1995
113	Colombia	5 September 1995
114	Angola	1995
115	Belarus	16 January 1996
116	North Macedonia	25 June 1996
117	Guyana	23 August 1996
118	Namibia	16 October 1996
119	Turkmenistan	22 November 1996
120	Latvia	10 December 1996
121	Estonia	24 April 1997
122	Togo	16 May 1997
123	Moldova	13 June 1997
124	Suriname	24 October 1997
125	Armenia	5 November 1997
126	Uzbekistan	27 November 1997
127	Mongolia	21 January 1998
128	Kyrgyzstan	3 March 1998
129	Zimbabwe	11 June 1998
130	Benin	2 November 1999
131	Dominican Republic	19 January 2000
132	Republic of the Congo	25 April 2000
133	Cyprus	21 February 2001
134	Lesotho	10 April 2001
135	Iceland	24 January 2002
136	Panama	8 February 2002
137	Grenada	28 March 2002
138	Belize	17 May 2002
139	Timor-Leste	May 2002
140	Vanuatu	16 September 2002
141	Eswatini	31 October 2002
142	Paraguay	8 November 2002
—	Holy See	18 November 2002
143	San Marino	3 May 2003
144	Jamaica	27 June 2003
145	El Salvador	24 September 2003
146	Kenya	28 December 2003
147	Dominica	20 February 2004
148	Costa Rica	17 March 2004
149	Bolivia	6 July 2004
150	Laos	3 February 2005
151	Palau	17 February 2005
152	Cape Verde	23 March 2005
153	Myanmar	26 September 2005
154	Antigua and Barbuda	9 October 2006
155	Montenegro	16 November 2006
156	Botswana	20 November 2006
157	Monaco	26 December 2006
158	Guatemala	27 February 2007
159	Andorra	15 May 2007
160	Barbados	4 December 2007
161	Cambodia	1 April 2008
162	Liberia	3 November 2009
163	Fiji	20 October 2010
164	Nigeria	2010
—	Kosovo	7 January 2011
165	Solomon Islands	8 February 2011
166	Samoa	9 March 2011
167	Tuvalu	29 March 2012
168	Honduras	17 May 2012
169	Malawi	26 September 2012
170	Saint Lucia	1 March 2013
171	Bahamas	1 August 2013
172	Haiti	5 August 2013
173	Liechtenstein	26 June 2014
174	Kiribati	28 March 2016
175	Papua New Guinea	22 February 2017
176	Saint Vincent and the Grenadines	20 March 2017
177	Rwanda	4 May 2017
178	Saint Kitts and Nevis	16 August 2017
179	Trinidad and Tobago	6 June 2019
180	Democratic Republic of the Congo	6 November 2019
181	South Sudan	10 September 2020
182	Equatorial Guinea	7 April 2021
183	São Tomé and Príncipe	4 May 2021
184	Madagascar	24 September 2021
185	Marshall Islands	12 July 2023
186	Tonga	17 February 2024
187	Bhutan	16 October 2025
188	Federated States of Micronesia	8 June 2026
189	Nauru	14 September 2026
190	Djibouti	Unknown

== Bilateral relations ==
=== Africa ===
Country	Formal relations began	Notes
Algeria		See Algeria-Qatar relations: Algeria has an embassy in Doha.; Qatar has an embassy in Algeria.
Benin		Benin has an embassy in Doha.; Qatar has an embassy in Cotonou.
Burkina Faso	1988	Relations between the two countries were inaugurated in 1988. Qatar agreed to donate $13.8 million towards the construction of a cancer hospital in Burkina Faso in December 2017. The same month, the Qatar Development Fund allocated $814,000 towards the commencement of humanitarian projects in Burkina Faso.
Chad		Qatar shuttered the Chadian embassy in Doha in August 2017, two months after Chad broke off diplomatic ties with Qatar over the Qatar diplomatic crisis, with Chad claiming that Qatar was attempting to destabilize it via Libya. Bilateral relations were returned to normal in February 2018 after a memorandum of understanding was signed.
Comoros		See Comoros–Qatar relations On 7 June 2017, Comoros cut ties with Qatar, following the lead of several other countries led by a quartet composed of Saudi Arabia, Bahrain, Egypt and the United Arab Emirates. After Comoros severed ties, local media reported that two local Qatari charities had suspended their activities in the country and that the $37 million under-construction hospital in Anjouan was put on hold. It was speculated that the cessation of philanthropic activities by Qatar was a retaliatory measure against Comoros' alignment with the Saudi-led quartet. Qatar also expelled Comoran representatives in the country on 19 June, giving them 48 hours to leave the country.
Cote D'Ivoire	1994	Both nations developed bilateral ties in 1994. In December 2017, during a visit to Abidjan by Emir Tamim bin Hamad Al Thani, Qatar pledged a $6 million donation for Côte d'Ivoire's development.
Djibouti		The Qatari embassy in Djibouti City was inaugurated in December 2005, shortly after the establishment of Djibouti's embassy in Doha. Qatari peacekeepers were deployed to help mediate a border dispute between Djibouti and Eritrea in June 2010. After it was reported that Djibouti had sided with the Saudi-led bloc in the 2017–18 Qatar diplomatic crisis, Qatar pulled its peacekeepers from the area.
Egypt		See Egypt–Qatar relations In recent years, relations have been tense. The main issue between the two governments is the Qatari support to the Muslim Brotherhood in Egypt. The Egyptian government, along with those of Saudi Arabia, Bahrain, and the United Arab Emirates, broke off diplomatic relations with Qatar on 5 June 2017. Egypt and Qatar resumed diplomatic relations on 20 January 2021.
Eritrea		Qatari peacekeepers were deployed to help mediate a border dispute between Djibouti and Eritrea in June 2010. During the Qatar diplomatic crisis, Eritrea was asked to sever ties with Qatar by the Saudi-led camp, but on 10 June 2017 it refused, claiming it had strong bonds with Qatar. Despite this, some news outlets later reported that Eritrea did in fact cut ties, though this was denied by the Eritrean government. In March 2018, Eritrea accused Qatar and Sudan of jointly funding rebel groups in its country. After this accusation, Qatar summoned the Eritrean ambassador and handed the Eritrean Ambassador a note of protest against the contents of the press statement issued by Eritrea.
Eswatini	2002	Both countries agreed to form diplomatic relations in 2002.: Eswatini has an embassy in Doha.; Qatar has an embassy in Mbabane.
Ethiopia		See Ethiopia–Qatar relations: Ethiopia has an embassy in Doha.; Qatar has an embassy in Addis Ababa.
Ghana	1982	Ghana has an embassy in Doha.
Kenya	2003	See Kenya–Qatar relations Diplomatic relations started in 2003.: Kenya has an embassy in Doha.; Qatar has an embassy in Nairobi.
Liberia	2009	Liberia has an embassy in Doha.; Qatar has an embassy in Monrovia.
Mali	1977	Relations between Mali and Qatar started in 1977. In December 2017, Emir Tamim bin Hamad Al Thani visited Mali and agreed to finance a program for the education of nearly 600,000 Malian children to the tune of $40 million.
Mauritania	1974	On 6 June 2017, Mauritania followed the lead of Saudi Arabia, the United Arab Emirates, Bahrain and Egypt in severing ties with Qatar. Mauritania's Foreign Ministry justified the decision by citing Qatar's alleged "support of terrorism" which has "resulted in heavy losses of human lives" throughout the region and beyond.: Mauritania has an embassy in Doha.; Qatar has an embassy in Nouakchott.
Morocco	1972	See Morocco–Qatar relations Qatar and Morocco formed diplomatic relations in 1972.: Morocco has an embassy in Doha.; Qatar has an embassy in Rabat.
Niger		Niger has maintained an embassy in Doha since 2015. On 10 June 2017, five days after the start Qatar diplomatic crisis, Niger sided with the Saudi-led camp and recalled its ambassador from Doha.
Nigeria		There are over 7,000 Nigerian citizens in Qatar.: Nigeria has an embassy in Doha.
Rwanda	4 May 2017	Qatar and Rwanda officially formed relations on 4 May 2017. In December 2019, Rwanda hosted the annual Sheikh Tamim Bin Hamad Al Thani International Anti-Corruption Excellence Award. The Emir of Qatar visited Rwanda for the same.
Senegal	10 February 1975	Qatar and Senegal formed diplomatic relations 10 February 1975. Senegal sided with the Saudi-led bloc and withdrew its ambassador from Doha after the onset of the Qatar diplomatic crisis in June 2017 but recalled its ambassador in August 2017, expressing its desire for a resolution to the crisis.: Senegal has an embassy in Doha.; Qatar has an embassy in Dakar.
Somalia	1970	See Somalia–Qatar relations The two countries formally established diplomatic ties in 1970. Somalia allegedly refused Saudi Arabia's offer to join it in severing ties with Qatar in June 2017 and instead opted to stay neutral.
South Africa	10 May 1994	See Qatar–South Africa relations Diplomatic relations between Qatar and South Africa were initiated on 10 May 1994, the same day that Nelson Mandela was sworn in as President of South Africa.: South Africa has an embassy in Doha.; Qatar has an embassy in Pretoria.
Sudan	1972	See Qatar–Sudan relations Relations between Qatar and Sudan were first established in 1972, when Qatar inaugurated its embassy in Sudan's capital city, Khartoum. Qatar remains one of the largest foreign investors in Sudan, and has helped broker peace agreements between the Sudanese government and rebel factions in Darfur.
Tanzania	13 December 1982	Bilateral relations between the two countries date back to 13 December 1982.: Tanzania has an embassy in Doha.; Qatar has an embassy in Dar es Salaam.
Tunisia		See Qatar–Tunisia relations Qatar is among the largest Arab investors in Tunisia. Relations between Qatar and Tunisia improved immensely between 2011 and 2013, when Ennahda Movement-affiliated candidate Hamadi Jebali was declared Prime Minister of Tunisia in the 2011 Tunisian Constituent Assembly elections. Cooperation in all fields gradually started picking up traction; for instance, the two governments signed ten bilateral agreements in 2012.

=== Americas ===
Country	Formal Relations Began	Notes
Argentina	15 June 1974	Argentina and Qatar's relations date back to 15 June 1974 when they signed joint agreement in New York.: Argentina has an embassy in Doha.; Qatar has an embassy in Buenos Aires.
Brazil	5 November 1974	See Brazil–Qatar relations Both countries formally established bilateral relations on 5 November 1974 – three years after Qatar gained its sovereignty.: Brazil has an embassy in Doha.; Qatar has an embassy in Brasília.
Canada		See Canada–Qatar relations: Canada has an embassy in Doha.; Qatar has an embassy in Ottawa.
Costa Rica	January 2010	Bilateral relations began after then-Emir Hamad bin Khalifa Al-Thani visited Costa Rica from 24 to 25 January 2010.: Costa Rica has an embassy in Doha.; Qatar has an embassy in San José.
Cuba	1989	Formal ties between Cuba and Qatar were established in 1989.: Cuba has an embassy in Doha.; Qatar has an embassy in Havana.
Dominican Republic	2000	In 2000, an agreement was signed between the Dominican Republic and Qatar to commence diplomatic relations.: The Dominican Republic has an embassy in Doha.; Qatar has an embassy in Santo Domingo.
Ecuador		Ecuador has an embassy in Doha.; Qatar has an embassy in Quito.
El Salvador	24 September 2003	Relations began on 24 September 2003.: El Salvador has an embassy in Doha.; Qatar has an embassy in San Salvador.
Guyana	23 August 1996	Diplomatic relations commenced on 23 August 1996. They are both members of the Organisation of Islamic Cooperation.: Guyana has an embassy in Doha.; Qatar has an embassy in Georgetown.
Mexico	30 June 1975	See Mexico–Qatar relations: Mexico has an embassy in Doha.; Qatar has an embassy in Mexico City.
Paraguay		Paraguay has an embassy in Doha.; Qatar has an embassy in Asunción.
Peru	1989	Main article: Peru–Qatar relations At an official level, both countries began diplomatic relations in 1989.: Peru has an embassy in Doha.; Qatar has an embassy in Lima.
St. Kitts and Nevis	16 August 2017	Both countries forged diplomatic relations on 16 August 2017 in a ceremony held in New York.
United States	19 March 1972	See Qatar–United States relations Embassy of Qatar in Washington, D.C. The United States formed diplomatic relations with Qatar on 19 March 1972, when diplomat William Stoltzfus met with Qatari government officials and submitted his credentials.: Qatar has an embassy in Washington, D.C. and consulates-general in Houston, Los Angeles and New York.; United States has an embassy in Doha.
Uruguay	16 March 1987	On 16 March 1987, the two countries officially inaugurated diplomatic relations.: Qatar has an embassy in Montevideo.; Uruguay has an embassy in Doha.

=== Asia ===
Country	Formal Relations Began	Notes
Afghanistan		During the waning years of Operation Enduring Freedom in 2010 the United States and the Taliban initiated exploratory talks in regards to ending the conflict in Afghanistan after the latter announced its intention to open an office in Doha. Though they were halted later amid Taliban accusations of malfeasance by the United States. In December 2011, Afghanistan recalled their envoy from Qatar in protest of the newly opened Taliban office. An Afghan government official later claimed that Qatar had not consulted with them prior to the inauguration of the office.
Armenia	5 November 1997	See also: Armenians in Qatar Both countries established diplomatic relations on 5 November 1997. Approximately 5,500 Armenians live in Qatar, mostly in the capital Doha.: Armenia has an embassy in Doha.; Qatar has an embassy in Yerevan.
Bahrain		See Bahrain-Qatar relations Both had a dispute over ownership of the Hawar Islands and the maritime boundary which was solved by the International Court of Justice (ICJ) in The Hague in 2001. On 5 March 2014, Bahrain withdrew its ambassadors from Qatar to protest Qatar's non-compliance with a November 2013 agreement not to "interfere" in countries' internal affairs. The widely accepted cause for this move was Qatar's alleged support for the organization, the Muslim Brotherhood. On 5 June 2017, Bahrain, along with Saudi Arabia, Egypt and the United Arab Emirates, announced that it would cut ties with Qatar. As of September 2023, all four countries had restored diplomatic ties with Qatar.
Bangladesh	25 January 1978	See Bangladesh–Qatar relations On 25 January 1978, an agreement on the commencement of diplomatic relations was signed. Approximately 123,000 Bangladeshi expatriates were working in Qatar in 2015, mainly in the construction sector. In June 2017, Bangladesh signed an agreement with Qatari company Qatargas, today QatarEnergy LNG, to receive 2.5 million tonnes of LNG annually for the following 15 years.
Brunei	2 October 1991	See Brunei–Qatar relations Relations between the two countries were established on 2 October 1991.: Brunei has an embassy in Doha.; Qatar has an embassy in Bandar Seri Begawan.
China	July 1988	See China–Qatar relations China and Qatar formed relations in July 1988. Emir Tamim bin Hamad made his first visit to China in November 2014. While there, he signed a number of accords with the Chinese leader Xi Jinping, one of which entailed the formation of a China-Qatar Strategic Partnership.: China has an embassy in Doha.; Qatar has an embassy in Beijing and a consulate-general in Guangzhou.
India	1973	See India–Qatar relations Indian Prime Minister Narendra Modi with Emir Tamim Bin Hamad Al Thani in Doha, June 2016 India and Qatar began bilateral relations in 1973. Both countries signed a maritime defence agreement and an information-sharing agreement in November 2008. As part of these agreements, the inaugural India-Qatar Joint Committee on Defence Co-operation meeting was hosted in the Qatari capital Doha in 2008.: India has an embassy in Doha.; Qatar has an embassy in New Delhi and a consulate-general in Mumbai.
Indonesia	1976	See Indonesia–Qatar relations Indonesia and Qatar established bilateral relations in 1976. The two countries have signed a number of memorandums of understanding in the fields of air transport, tourism, and agriculture.: Indonesia has an embassy in Doha.; Qatar has an embassy in Jakarta.
Iran	October 1971	See Iran–Qatar relations Qatar and Iran signed an agreement on setting up diplomatic relations in October 1971, only one month after Qatar gained its independence. The two countries have close ties. Both are members of OPEC, the Non-Aligned Movement, and the Organization of the Islamic Conference. Unlike fellow GCC member states Saudi Arabia and the UAE, Qatar generally refrains from criticizing Iran's domestic and foreign activities. Qatar has also held several high-level meetings with Iranian officials to discuss security and economic agreements. They jointly control the world's largest gas field. In addition to ties in the oil and natural gas arena, Iran and Qatar also cooperate in the shipping sector. In January 2016, as a result of the attack on the Saudi diplomatic missions in Iran by Iranian protesters, Qatar recalled its ambassador to Tehran and denounced the attack. On 23 August 2017, Qatar announced it would return its ambassador to Iran.
Iraq		Following the 1990–91 Gulf War, in which Qatar and Iraq were on opposing sides, Qatar closed their embassy in Baghdad. Relations gradually improved between the two countries in the late 1990s. Qatar reopened its embassy for the first time twenty-five years in mid-2015, and in September 2015, appointed its ambassador to Iraq. In June 2023, during a state visit to Baghdad, Qatar's Emir Sheikh Tamim bin Hamad Al Thani met with Iraqi Prime Minister Mohammed Shia al-Sudani and pledged to make a $5 billion investment in Iraq.
Israel	(Relations severed 2009)	See Israel–Qatar relations Qatar established trade relations with the State of Israel in 1996. Despite Qatar's alleged support of Hamas, Israeli leaders have maintained direct contact with the emirate. In January 2007, in his last months as vice premier, Shimon Peres paid a high-profile visit to the capital city of Doha. Peres also visited Qatar in 1996, when he launched the new Israeli trade bureau there. The bureau was closed in February 2009. In 2010, Qatar twice offered to restore trade relations with Israel and allow the reinstatement of the Israeli mission in Doha, on condition that Israel allow Qatar to send materials and money to Gaza for its infrastructure, and that Israel make a public statement expressing appreciation for Qatar's efforts. Israel refused on the grounds that Qatari materials could be used by Hamas against Israel, and that Israel did not want to get involved in the competition between Qatar and Egypt over mediation.
Japan	1972	See Japan–Qatar relations Diplomatic relations between Qatar and Japan were established in 1972. The two countries share strong economic ties, with Japan being Qatar's foremost trading partner, and Qatar ranking as Japan's sixth most significant import partner in 2016. Japan has an embassy in Doha.
Jordan	1972	See Jordan–Qatar relations Qatar and Jordan had turbulent relations since the 2000s. Authorities in Qatar arrested and tried a Jordanian journalist working for Qatar TV named Firas Majali on charges of espionage in February 2002 and in August 2002, Jordan closed Al Jazeera's Amman bureau over a segment deemed insulting towards its ruling family. Additionally, Jordan recalled its ambassador to Doha that month. A Qatari court sentenced Firas Majali to death in October 2002, but in March 2003, the Qatari emir granted Majali a pardon after meeting with King Abdullah II of Jordan. This prompted Jordan to reinstate Al Jazeera's Amman bureau that year. On 6 June 2017, one day after the beginning of the 2017 Qatari diplomatic crisis, Jordan announced that it would be cutting back ties with Qatar in solidarity with the blockading countries as well as shuttering the Al Jazeera bureau based there. Bilateral trade between Qatar and Jordan improved by the end of the third quarter of 2019, with the number of joint Qatari-Jordanian companies established in the Qatari market exceeding 1,700 as compared to 1,550 firms at the end of 2018.
Kazakhstan	July 1993	See Kazakhstan–Qatar relations Kazakhstan and Qatar signed an official agreement formalizing diplomatic relations in July 1993.: Kazakhstan has an embassy in Doha.; Qatar has an embassy in Astana.
Kuwait		See Kuwait–Qatar relations In 1990, at the beginning of the Gulf War, Qatar was among the Arab countries to condemn Iraq's occupation of Kuwait. It also pledged military support to Kuwait. Qatari soldiers participated in the Battle of Khafji, the first major ground engagement in the Gulf War. Amir Sabah Al-Sabah was recognized as chief mediator of the 2017 Qatari diplomatic crisis. Kuwait's neutrality and good relations with both parties were the main reasons behind its status as mediator.
Lebanon		Qatar mediated negotiations between leading Lebanese political parties in 2008 during the backdrop of the 2006–08 Lebanese protests. The Doha Agreement was signed by all parties in May after five days of negotiations, resolving the crisis. In 2010, the Qatari emir became the first Arab leader to tour South Lebanon and view the various projects it funded following the 2006 Lebanon War. Qatar contributed $3mn in funding to the restoration of Lebanon following the war, and financed the reconstruction of over 12,000 residential units and a number of buildings in 195 villages in southern Lebanon. The emir visited a hospital in Bint Jbeil and a nearby mosque and church which he funded the reconstruction of, while being accompanied by Lebanon's President Michel Sleiman and Prime Minister Saad al-Hariri. In January 2019, the Qatari government pledged to invest in Lebanon by purchasing government bonds worth $500 million in order to improve Lebanon's economic situation.
Malaysia	1974	See Malaysia–Qatar relations The two countries formalized diplomatic relations in 1974.: Malaysia has an embassy in Doha.; Qatar has an embassy in Kuala Lumpur.
Maldives	26 May 1984	The two countries initiated relations on 26 May 1984. On 5 June 2017, in solidarity with Saudi Arabia, Bahrain, the United Arab Emirates and Egypt, Maldives decided to sever ties with Qatar.
Mongolia	21 January 1998	The inception of Mongolia–Qatar relations dates back to 21 January 1998. Qatar donated $10 million to Mongolia for its Millennium Road Project in 2006. In February 2020, Qatar and Mongolia signed a memorandum of understanding to establish political consultations between the foreign affairs ministries of both the countries.
Nepal	21 January 1977	Diplomatic relations were inaugurated on 21 January 1977. The Nepali ambassador to Qatar, Maya Kumari Sharma, described the emirate as an "open jail" in reference to the working conditions of migrant Nepali laborers.: Nepal has an embassy in Doha.; Qatar has an embassy in Kathmandu.
Oman	1970	See Oman–Qatar relations Formal diplomatic relations date back to 1970. Oman helped facilitate shipping to Qatar after several Arab countries cut sea routes to Qatar during the 2017 Qatar diplomatic crisis. Following the onset of the crisis in June 2017, most Qatari-destined goods flowed through the Port of Salalah and Sohar Port. Two direct shipping lines between the aforementioned ports and Qatar's Hamad Port were launched the same month. When Qatar Airways was banned from Saudi airspace, Oman stepped in and transported Saudi-based Qataris back to Doha. At the official level, Oman remained uninvolved in the dispute, but its status as an alternative transit route has helped Qatar bypass the blockade imposed by its neighbors.
Pakistan	1972	See Pakistan–Qatar relations Formal diplomatic ties were formed in 1972.: Pakistan has an embassy in Doha.; Qatar has an embassy in Islamabad and a consulate-general in Karachi.; Qatar invested $500 million in Pakistan in June 2019 as part of a planned $3 billion investment in the country.
Philippines	5 May 1981	See Philippines–Qatar relations The Philippines and Qatar established diplomatic relations on 5 May 1981. As of 2014, about 200,000 Filipinos live in Qatar.
Saudi Arabia		See Saudi Arabia-Qatar relations and Qatar–Saudi Arabia proxy conflict In September 1992, tensions arose between Qatar and Saudi Arabia when Saudi forces allegedly attacked a Qatari border post, resulting in the death of two Qatari soldiers and the imprisonment of a third. Saudi Arabia withdrew its ambassador from Doha due to some reservations over Al Jazeera content in 2002. It was not until 2008 that Saudi Arabia reinstated its ambassador to Qatar. On 5 March 2014, Saudi Arabia once again withdrew its ambassador from Qatar, this time to protest Qatar's non-compliance with a November 2013 agreement not to "interfere" in countries' internal affairs. The widely accepted cause for this move was Qatar's alleged support for the Muslim Brotherhood. On 5 June 2017, Saudi Arabia cut diplomatic relations with Qatar. The move was followed by a number of other countries in the region and beyond.
Singapore	1984	Diplomatic ties between the two were created in 1984.: Singapore has an embassy in Doha.; Qatar has an embassy in Singapore.
South Korea	April 1974	Qatar and South Korea established diplomatic relations in 1974. On 8 March 2015, Qatari foreign minister Khalid bin Mohammad Al Attiyah and his South Korean counterpart, Yun Byung-se signed a memorandum of understanding entailing joint diplomatic training between the Diplomatic Institute of Qatar and the Korea National Diplomatic Academy. Emir Tamim bin Hamad Al Thani and South Korean president Park Geun-hye attended the signing ceremony held in Doha.: South Korea has an embassy in Doha.; Qatar has an embassy in Seoul.
Syria	19 January 1972	See Qatar–Syria relations: Both countries established diplomatic relations on 19 January 1972.; Relations were totally cut off between 18 July 2011 and 14 December 2024.; Qatar has again an embassy in Damascus since 21 December 2024.; Syria has an embassy in Doha.
Thailand	1980	See Qatar–Thailand relations Qatar and Thailand formed relations in 1980. Their cooperation mainly revolves around tourism and energy. In 2019, considering Qatar's advancements in the field of sports, Thailand signed a MoU with Qatar for sports cooperation and exchange.
Turkey	1973	See Qatar–Turkey relations The history of bilateral relations between Qatar and Turkey dates back to the 1973. In the 1980s, the two nations began signing bilateral agreements with one another. Relations gained further traction in the 2000s with the signing of a further number of bilateral agreements. Qatar and Turkey share similar positions on the Syrian Civil War and the Egyptian Crisis. Their coordination in regional politics has been described as an alliance. On 2 December 2015, during a Turkish presidential visit to Qatar, Tamim bin Hamad and Tayyip Erdoğan announced the planned creation of a Turkish military base in Qatar; a first for Turkey in the Persian Gulf. As part of their foreign policy priorities, both countries overtly provide region-wide support for the Muslim Brotherhood.: Qatar has an embassy in Ankara and a consulate-general in Istanbul.; Turkey has an embassy in Doha.
United Arab Emirates		See Qatar–United Arab Emirates relations In 1995, after Hamad bin Khalifa deposed his father to become emir of Qatar, UAE granted asylum to the deposed Khalifa bin Hamad. Qatar accused UAE, along with Saudi Arabia and Bahrain, of plotting against the new emir, to which the accused countries denied all charges. Several hundred arrests were made in relation to the incident throughout the next two years, and in February 1996, the Qatar Amiri Guard was mobilised. UAE was one of the three countries which withdrew their ambassadors from Qatar in 2014. On 5 June 2017, UAE, along with Saudi Arabia, Bahrain and Egypt, cut diplomatic ties with Qatar, giving the country's diplomats 48 hours to leave the country. UAE was implicated in the hacking of the Qatar News Agency, which set off the diplomatic crisis. In January 2021, UAE and Qatar agreed to resume diplomatic relations. In June 2023, both countries reopened their embassies and appointed ambassadors in July and August.
Uzbekistan	27 November 1997	In a meeting in Ankara on 27 November 1997, Qatar and Uzbekistan released a joint statement formally declaring the commencement of diplomatic relations.
Vietnam	8 February 1993	See Qatar–Vietnam relations Qatar and Vietnam formed ties on 8 February 1993.: Vietnam has an embassy in Doha.; Qatar has an embassy in Hanoi.

=== Europe ===
Country	Formal Relations Began	Notes
Austria		Austria has an embassy in Doha.; Qatar has an embassy in Vienna.
Belgium		Belgium has an embassy in Doha.; Qatar has an embassy in Brussels.
Bosnia and Herzegovina		Bosnia and Herzegovina has an embassy in Doha.; Qatar has an embassy in Sarajevo.
Cyprus		See Cyprus–Qatar relations: Cyprus has an embassy in Doha.; Qatar has an embassy in Nicosia.
Czech Republic	1990	Czech Republic has an embassy in Doha.; Qatar has an embassy in Prague.
France		See France–Qatar relations France maintains an embassy in Doha, while Qatar maintains an embassy in Paris. The first bilateral agreement was signed in 1974. Qatar is an associate member of the Organisation internationale de la Francophonie. Both countries share strong economic and military ties. France and Qatar signed a defense pact since 1994, and a significant portion of Qatar's military equipment is imported from France. In 2012, Qatar became France's seventh largest customer and sixth largest supplier in the Near East. Exports from France focus mainly on the supply of capital goods, deliveries of Airbus aircraft, and trade. Qatar's sovereign wealth fund holds stakes in Vivendi, Lagardère Group, and Vinci SA.
Germany	1973	See Germany–Qatar relations Qatari embassy in Berlin Qatar has had an embassy in Berlin since 2005, and Germany has an embassy in Doha. Bilateral ties were formed in 1973. In regards to economic relations, Qatar has made large-scale investments in some of Germany's most prominent companies, including Volkswagen, Siemens and Deutsche Bank. On 6 June 2017, German FM Sigmar Gabriel condemned the Saudi-led boycott of Qatar. In July, he called on the blockading countries to respect Qatar's rights as a sovereign nation, and applauded its prudence in responding to the blockade.
Greece	1973	See Greece–Qatar relations Greece and Qatar officially formed relations in 1973.: Greece has an embassy in Doha.; Qatar has an embassy in Athens.
Italy		See Italy–Qatar relations: Italy has an embassy in Doha.; Qatar has an embassy in Rome and a consulate-general in Milan.
Kosovo	7 January 2011	The Qatari Ministry of Foreign Affairs announced to Kosovan government officials that it would be recognizing the country's sovereignty on 4 January 2011, being the 73rd country to do so. Diplomatic relations between the two were formalized on 7 January 2011.
Malta		Qatar has an embassy in Valletta.
Netherlands		The Netherlands has an embassy in Doha.; Qatar has an embassy in The Hague.; On 12 January 2023, Dutch Foreign Minister Wopke Hoekstra tweeted about meeting the Emir of Qatar, Sheikh Tamim bin Hamad Al Thani, where they discussed Ukraine, global energy security, and regional developments. Hoekstra also tweeted that this meeting worked to reaffirm the "good bilateral relations" between both countries, as Qatar "helps foster stability" in an "unpredictable geopolitical landscape." He further added that the Netherlands "greatly values Qatar's support in facilitating the safe passage of people from Afghanistan via Doha to the Netherlands,".; On 24 June 2024, Emir Sheikh Tamim bin Hamad Al Thani visited the Netherlands at the invitation of King Willem-Alexander. Both nations showed dedication to strengthening bilateral connections and collaboration in multiple sectors, as discussed. The dialogues focus on enhancing cooperation across a spectrum of critical sectors, such as sustainable energy, water management, and food security.
North Macedonia	25 June 1996	Both countries initialized relations on 25 June 1996 in a public ceremony held in New York.: Qatar has an embassy in Skopje.; North Macedonia has an embassy in Doha.
Portugal		Portugal has an embassy in Doha.
Romania	22 October 1990	Ties between Qatar and Romania were established on 22 October 1990.: Qatar has an embassy in Bucharest.; Romania has an embassy in Doha.
Russia	1988	See Qatar–Russia relations Russian President Vladimir Putin meets with Qatar's Emir Sheikh Tamim bin Hamad Al Thani, Moscow, January 2016 Qatar–Russia relations started in 1988 during the Soviet Union era.: Qatar has an embassy in Moscow.; Russia has an embassy in Doha.
Spain	December 1972	See Qatar–Spain relations: Qatar has an embassy in Madrid.; Spain has an embassy in Doha.
Sweden		See Qatar–Sweden relations: Qatar has an embassy in Stockholm.; Sweden has an embassy in Doha.
Ukraine	1993	Qatar has an embassy in Kyiv.; Ukraine has an embassy in Doha.; In June 2023, Qatar pledged $100 million in reconstruction assistance for health and education sectors, as well as for humanitarian demining. Qatar mediated an agreement in April 2024 between Russia and Ukraine to exchange nearly 50 displaced children from Moscow's invasion. Maria Lvova-Belova, the Kremlin's commissioner for children's rights, announced in Doha.
United Kingdom	1971	See Qatar–United Kingdom relations Qatar established diplomatic relations with the United Kingdom on 24 May 1972.: Qatar maintains an embassy in London.; The United Kingdom is accredited to Qatar through its embassy in Doha.; The UK governed Qatar from 1916 to 1971, when it achieved full independence. Both countries share common membership of the World Trade Organization. Bilaterally the two countries have a Climate Technology Partnership, a Security Pact, a Strategic Investment Partnership, and have signed an Investment Agreement. The UK and the Gulf Cooperation Council, of which Qatar is a member, are negotiating a free trade agreement.

=== Oceania ===
Country	Formal Relations Began	Notes
Australia		See Australia–Qatar relations: Australia has an embassy in Doha.; Qatar has an embassy in Canberra.
Fiji	20 October 2010	Qatar and Fiji officially formed diplomatic relations on 20 October 2010 in a public ceremony held in New York. In a 2014 incident where 45 Fijian peacekeepers were kidnapped and confined for two weeks in Syria by militants with connections to Al Qaeda, Qatar's government claimed responsibility for successfully negotiating the safe release of the peacekeepers. It was reported in April 2017 that Fijian officials met with the Qatari government to discuss the possibility of turning the emirate into a refuge for Fijian peacekeepers in emergency situations.

== See also ==
- List of diplomatic missions in Qatar
- List of diplomatic missions of Qatar
- Territorial disputes in the Persian Gulf
- Visa requirements for Qatari citizens
- Qatar corruption scandal at the European Parliament
