= Kazakhstan–Qatar relations =

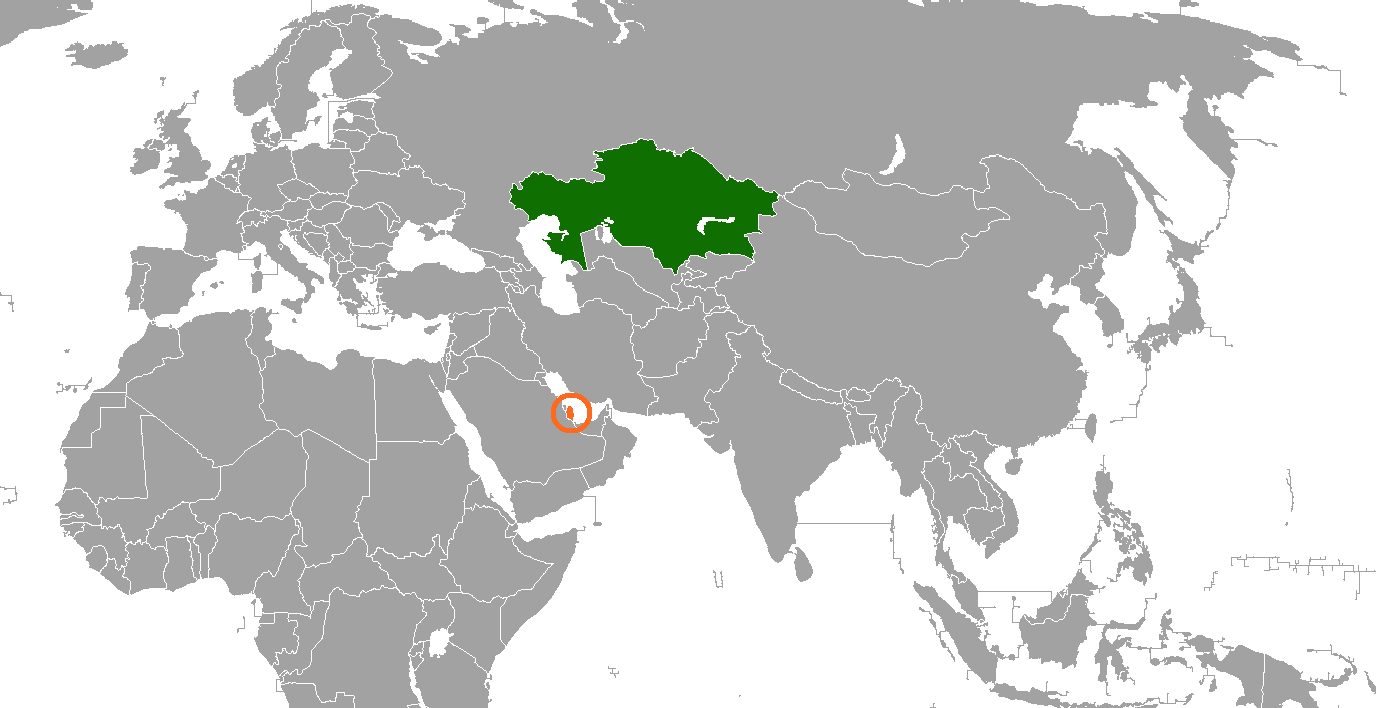

- Kazakhstan: Qatar

Kazakhstan–Qatar relations are the bilateral relations between the Republic of Kazakhstan and the State of Qatar. Diplomatic relations were established in 1993. Kazakhstan has an embassy in Doha. Qatar has an embassy in Astana. Both countries are members of Organisation of Islamic Cooperation.

== Diplomatic relations ==
Kazakhstan and Qatar signed an official agreement formalizing diplomatic relations in July 1993. Kazakhstan established an embassy in Doha in May 2007; this was reciprocated by the opening of a Qatari embassy in Astana in October 2016. Ahmed bin Ali Al Tamimi served as Qatar's first resident ambassador to Kazakhstan.

== High level visits ==
In May 1997, Kazakh Foreign Minister K. Tokayev visited Qatar, marking the first high-level exchange to occur between the two countries. Qatar sent its Foreign Minister Hamad bin Jassim Al Thani on an official visit to Kazakhstan in April 1998. In the following month, President Nursultan Nazarbayev arrived in Doha and stayed from May 23 to May 25.

Former Emir of Qatar Hamad bin Khalifa Al-Thani toured Kazakhstan for the first time in April 1999. In doing so, he also became the first GCC leader to travel to the country on official capacity. Nazarbayev's second presidential trip to Qatar would take place in March 2007, while Hamad bin Khalifa would make his second visit to Kazakhstan in March 2008.

In January 2014, Emir Tamim bin Hamad Al Thani made his first official visit to Kazakhstan. Several agreements were signed during this visit, including an agreement on the avoidance of double taxation, a cooperation agreement by QatarEnergy and the Kazakhstan National Mining Company, and a cooperation agreement between the Qatar Investment Authority and the Samruk-Kazyna. The third presidential visit by Nazarbayev occurred in December 2015.

On 7 June 2023, the Emir Tamim bin Hamad Al Thani visited President Kassym-Jomart Tokayev in Astana, which was the Emir's third visit to Kazakhstan. They discussed regional and international developments and expressed their wish to further develop the cooperation between the two countries. The leaders also mentioned the 30th anniversary of the establishment of bilateral relations. The meeting took place prior to the Astana International Forum.

== Economic relations ==
Construction of the new Kazakh capital city of Astana was assisted by Qatari funds. Specifically, $6.8 million was donated by Qatar to fund the construction of an Islamic Center in the city.

To help improve bilateral relations between Kazakhstan and Qatar, the Kazakhstan-Qatar Joint Intergovernmental Commission was set up. Only four meetings have been held; in June 2000, May 2001, October 2009, and October 2015.

The Qatar-Kazakhstan Business Council held its first meeting in October 2008. During the meeting, business opportunities in Qatar's gas & oil sector and construction sector as well as possible joint ventures were discussed.

Both countries are cooperating in Islamic banking, with Qatar's Financial Center and the Astana International Financial Centre signing a memorandum of understanding in August 2016.

It was announced in May 2017 that Qatar agreed to fund two maternity hospitals in Almaty and a school in Astana at the cost of $35 million. The school would be named after Emir of Qatar, Tamim bin Hamad Al Thani.

Current trade volume between the two countries is low mainly due to issues concerning the transportation of materials. Efforts have been made to create a trade route running through Iran. Trade turnover has seen some improvements since the 2010s; for example, trade volume was raised from $463,500 in 2015 to $746,500 in 2016.

== Media relations ==
Qatari conglomerate Al Jazeera opened its first Central Asian branch in Almaty in February 2008.

== Cultural relations ==
Following an agreement reached during the 2nd meeting of the Kazakhstan-Qatar Joint Intergovernmental Commission, "Days of Culture of Kazakhstan" were held in Doha from March 19 to March 31, 2002. During this event, Kazakh actors and singers performed in concerts and Kazakh culture was showcased in exhibitions.

A similar event known as "Days of Culture of Qatar" was held in Almaty from June 10 to June 15, 2008. This event featured exhibitions with Qatari handicrafts and traditional cuisine, movie viewings of Qatari films, the distribution of leaflets by Qatar's Ministry of Culture, and concerts featuring authentic Qatari dance troupes, instruments and singers.

== Migration ==
There are roughly 200 Kazakh citizens living in Qatar as of 2015. Most are employed within Qatar's gas and oil industry.

== Resident diplomatic missions ==
- Kazakhstan has an embassy in Doha.
- Qatar has an embassy in Astana.

== See also ==
- Foreign relations of Kazakhstan
- Foreign relations of Qatar
