= Australia–Qatar relations =

Bilateral relations

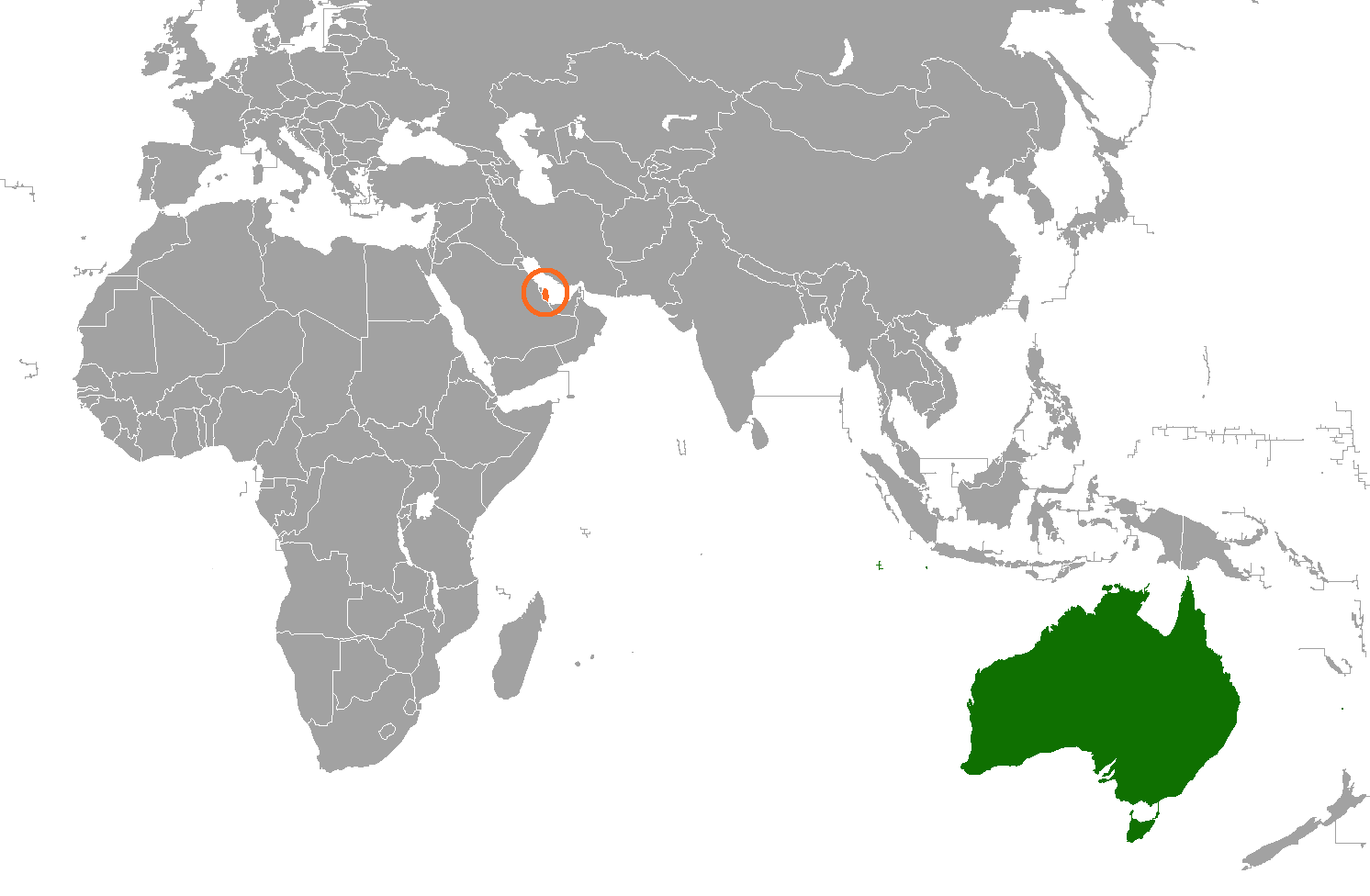

- Australia: Qatar

Bilateral relations between Australia and Qatar are focused on trade, investment, aviation, and humanitarian ties. Australia recognized Qatar on its independence in 1971, with formal diplomatic relations established in 1980. Resident embassies were established in Canberra in 2012 and Doha in 2016. In August 2024, the Prime Minister of Qatar visited Australia.

The two countries are active trading partners despite competing in the global liquefied natural gas (LNG) export market. Two-way trade totalled A$3.5 billion in 2024–25, with Australia exporting alumina, meat, and engineering services, and Qatar supplying aviation services and refined petroleum. State-backed Qatari investment in Australia is estimated at A$4 billion, spanning agricultural landholdings, airport infrastructure, and renewable energy.

Humanitarian and consular cooperation is a significant component of the relationship. During the COVID-19 pandemic, Qatar Airways maintained continuous commercial routes to Australia, repatriating thousands of stranded citizens. The Qatari government has also provided critical logistical and diplomatic support to Australian evacuations from conflict zones, including chartering flights for Australian evacuees following the 2021 fall of Kabul, and mediating border agreements to allow Australian citizens to escape the 2023–24 Gaza crisis.

Relations were tested after an October 2020 incident in which Australian women transiting Hamad International Airport were subjected to strip searches, later influencing the Australian Government's decision to block a Qatar Airways route expansion in 2023.

== Trade and investment ==
Qatar is one of Australia's largest trading partners in the Middle East and North Africa region. Two-way goods and services trade totalled A$3.5 billion in 2024–25, an increase of 12.8 per cent over five years. Australia's primary exports to Qatar include alumina, meat, and engineering services, while imports from Qatar are dominated by aviation services and refined petroleum.

Qatari foreign direct investment in Australia spans agriculture, infrastructure, commercial real estate, and renewable energy, with public estimates placing its value at approximately A$4 billion.

In agriculture, Hassad Food—an investment arm of the Qatar Investment Authority (QIA)—initially invested more than A$500 million to acquire pastoral and cropping properties across five Australian states. In 2018, Hassad restructured this holding, transferring direct ownership of more than 100,000 hectares of farmland to Macquarie Group in exchange for a reinvestment into Macquarie's broader agricultural portfolios.

In the infrastructure and energy sectors, Qatari investment has expanded into airport, electricity, and renewable energy assets. In 2020, Nebras Power acquired a 49 per cent stake in the 527 MW Stockyard Hill Wind Farm in Victoria, which at the time of construction was the largest wind farm in the Southern Hemisphere. In April 2025, Qatar Airways and Virgin Australia announced a partnership with Renewable Developments Australia to support the development of a sustainable aviation fuel project in Charters Towers, Queensland, designed to produce up to 96 million litres annually.

== Aviation relations ==
In July 2023, the Australian Government denied a request by Qatar Airways for 28 additional weekly flights, citing national interest grounds. The decision prompted the establishment of a Senate Select Committee, which concluded in October 2023 that the rejection cost the Australian economy up to $1 billion and alleged the decision had been influenced by lobbying from then-Qantas CEO Alan Joyce. The committee recommended an immediate review of the decision; however, Transport Minister Catherine King dismissed the inquiry as a "ridiculous farce", and a subsequent motion to restart the hearings was defeated in early 2024.

On 1 October 2024, Qatar Airways announced its intention to acquire a 25 per cent cornerstone stake in Virgin Australia. The acquisition was approved by Treasurer Jim Chalmers in February 2025 on the advice of the Foreign Investment Review Board, with the Australian Competition and Consumer Commission subsequently authorising a five-year integrated alliance. Under this arrangement, Virgin Australia commenced 28 weekly flights to Doha from Sydney, Melbourne, Brisbane, and Perth, utilising aircraft and crew wet-leased from Qatar Airways.

In May 2026, the Australian Government signed expanded bilateral air service agreements with Qatar and the United Arab Emirates. The agreement granted airlines from those nations an additional seven weekly passenger services exclusively through the new curfew-free Western Sydney International Airport, which is scheduled to open to passengers in October 2026.

== Humanitarian cooperation and evacuations ==
Qatar has provided repeated assistance to the Australian Government in repatriating citizens during global crises and regional conflicts.

During the COVID-19 pandemic, when Australia implemented strict border closures and arrival caps, Qatar Airways was one of the few international airlines to maintain continuous scheduled and charter passenger flights to Australia. According to Australian government aviation data, the airline accounted for a significant proportion of international passenger movements during the peak of the repatriation effort.

Qatar served as a critical transit hub and mediator during the 2021 Kabul airlift following the Taliban takeover of Afghanistan. Qatar Airways operated charter flights to assist the Australian Government in evacuating 405 Australians and vulnerable Afghans.

Following the outbreak of the Israel–Hamas war in October 2023, Qatar Airways operated a chartered flight from Dubai to Sydney to repatriate 222 Australians escaping the conflict. In October 2024, at the request of the Australian Government, the airline operated two free repatriation charter flights from Cyprus to Sydney, evacuating approximately 700 Australians fleeing the conflict in Lebanon. During the 2026 Iran War, the Australian Government coordinated closely with Qatar Airways and other Gulf carriers to secure commercial flight seats and arrange ground transport out of Doha for stranded Australian citizens.

Diplomatically, Australia and Qatar have engaged in bilateral discussions regarding the humanitarian crisis in the Gaza Strip. Following talks between Australian Assistant Minister for Foreign Affairs Tim Watts and Qatari Minister of State Lolwah Al Khater, Australia formally commended Qatar's role as a primary mediator in ceasefire and hostage negotiations between Israel and Hamas. When a ceasefire agreement was reached in early 2025, the Australian Government explicitly thanked Qatar for its mediation efforts.

In September 2025, following Israeli airstrikes against Hamas targets within Qatar, Australian Foreign Minister Penny Wong publicly condemned the action as a "violation of Qatar's sovereignty" that imperilled ceasefire negotiations. Later that year, Qatar formally joined the Declaration for the Protection of Humanitarian Personnel, a global policy initiative spearheaded by Australia to uphold international humanitarian law.

== 2020 Hamad International Airport incident ==
On 2 October 2020, a newborn infant was found abandoned in a toilet at Hamad International Airport in Doha. In response, Qatari security officials removed female passengers from several departing aircraft, including Qatar Airways flight QR908 to Sydney, and directed that some be subjected to non-consensual physical examinations. Thirteen Australian women were removed from QR908.

The incident became a significant consular and diplomatic issue in Australia–Qatar relations. Qatar apologised, said the actions taken by officials violated Qatari laws and values, referred responsible officials to the Public Prosecution Office, and announced a review of airport procedures. Australian officials later told a Senate inquiry that a Qatari official had been prosecuted, convicted and sentenced for their role in incident.

Five Australian women later brought civil proceedings in the Federal Court of Australia against Qatar Airways, the Qatar Civil Aviation Authority and MATAR, the airport operator. In 2025, the Full Court of the Federal Court allowed claims against Qatar Airways and MATAR to proceed, while upholding dismissal of the claim against the Qatar Civil Aviation Authority on foreign state immunity grounds. The claims against Qatar Airways and MATAR were reported to have settled in June 2026.

== 2023 lost documents incident ==
In October 2024, Australian media reported that a locked bag containing federal cabinet documents had been lost by an Australian government staffer while transiting Hamad International Airport in July 2023. The staffer, who worked for Minister Murray Watt, reportedly left the bag on an aircraft after disembarking in Doha. According to the reports, the staffer realised the error shortly afterward, but a search of the aircraft and inquiries with the airport's lost property office failed to locate the bag. The Australian Embassy in Qatar was subsequently notified of the loss.

== Expatriate communities ==
Qatar hosts an estimated several thousand Australian expatriates. Australian professionals in Qatar are predominantly employed in the aviation, engineering, construction, education, and healthcare sectors, supported by consular services from the Australian Embassy in Doha. The Qatari diaspora in Australia is small by comparison. It consists primarily of tertiary students—many supported by Qatari government scholarships—alongside diplomatic personnel and corporate representatives.

== Diplomatic representation ==
Prior to 2012, Qatar managed its relationship with Australia via non-resident accreditation through the Embassy of Qatar in Jakarta, Indonesia. In 2012, Qatar established its resident representation in Canberra, Australia, with its first resident ambassador presenting credentials on 17 April 2012.

Similarly, before 2016, Australia did not maintain a resident embassy in Doha. The bilateral relationship was managed through non-resident accreditation by the Australian Ambassador to the United Arab Emirates, based in Abu Dhabi. In 2016, Australia established a resident embassy in Doha, which was officially opened by then-Minister for Foreign Affairs Julie Bishop.

=== Australian Ambassadors to Qatar ===
Ambassador	Term start	Term end	Notes
Axel Wabenhorst	July 2016	July 2019	First resident ambassador.
Jonathan Muir	July 2019	July 2023	Awarded the Al Wajbah Decoration by the Emir of Qatar in June 2023 for services to the bilateral relationship.
Shane Flanagan	July 2023	Incumbent	

=== Qatari Ambassadors to Australia ===
Ambassador	Term start	Term end	Notes
Yousef Ali Al-Khater	17 April 2012	September 2014	First resident ambassador.
Nasser bin Hamad Al Khalifa	21 June 2016	Mid-2018	
Saad Abdulla Al Mahmoud	28 August 2018	May 2024	
Ali Saad M.H. Al-Hajri	7 August 2024	Incumbent	

== See also ==
- 2017 Qatar diplomatic crisis
- Foreign relations of Australia
- Foreign relations of Qatar
