= Brazil–Qatar relations =

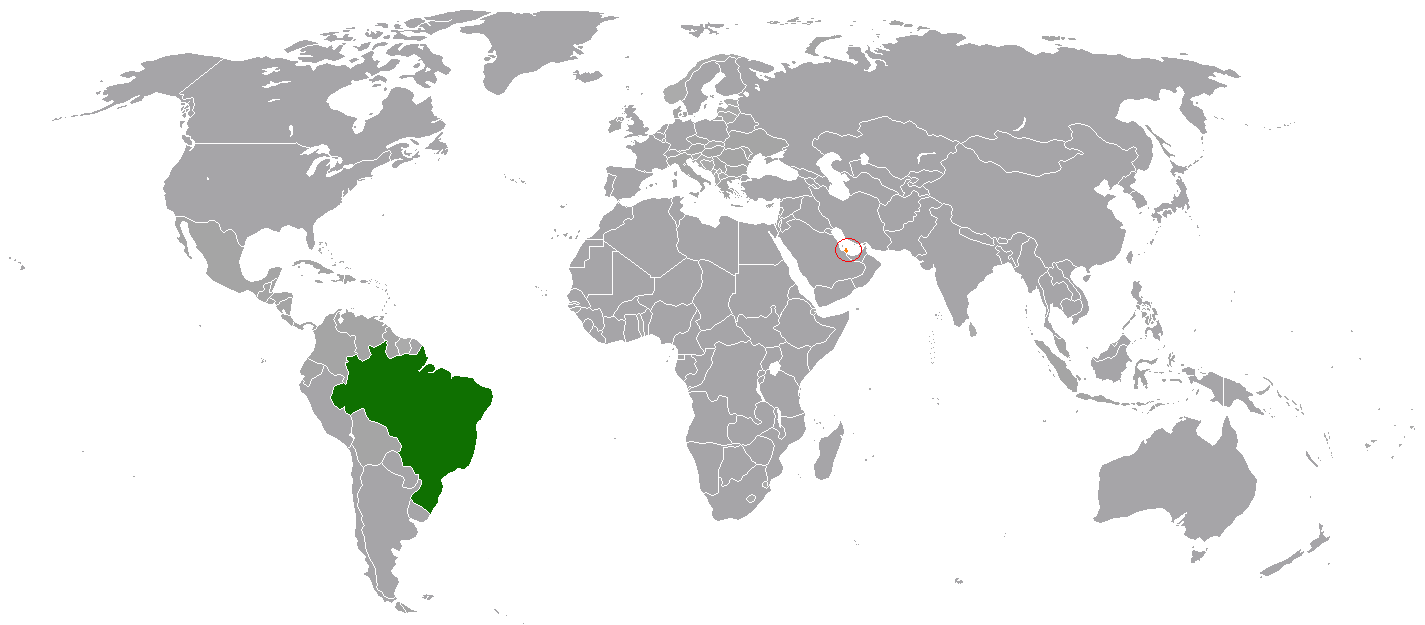

- Brazil: Qatar

Brazil–Qatar relations are the bilateral relations between Brazil and Qatar. Diplomatic relations were formed in 1974.

== History ==
Brazil and Qatar formally established bilateral relations on 5 November 1974 – three years after Qatar gained its sovereignty. As neither country had a resident embassy at that time, Qatar was represented through its Permanent Mission to the U.N. in New York, while Brazil maintained representation via at its embassy in Abu Dhabi.

Qatar opened an embassy in Brasília in January 1997, but it was shut down in March 1999 due to Brazil’s lack of funds to establish its own embassy in Doha. In February 2005, Foreign Minister Celso Amorim visited Qatar to announce plans for a Brazilian embassy in Doha. The plan materialized in May of that year. Two years later, in June 2007, the Qatari embassy in Brasília was reinstated.

== High level visits ==
In January 1994, Qatari Foreign Minister Hamad bin Jassim Al Thani visited Brazil, marking the first high-level exchange between the two countries and the only official visit of the 20th century. The mutual opening of embassies was among the topics discussed during the visit.

In January 2010, Emir of Qatar Hamad bin Khalifa Al-Thani became the first Head of State to make an official visit to Brazil. Brazilian President Luiz Inácio Lula da Silva made a return visit to Qatar in May of the same year.

Brazilian Foreign Minister Antonio Patriota visited Doha in March 2011, where he met with Qatari Emir Hamad bin Khalifa, Foreign Minister Hamad bin Jassim, and officials from Al Jazeera Network.

In November 2021, Brazilian President Jair Bolsonaro also made an official visit to Qatar.

== Economic relations ==
In 2006, Qatar’s national air carrier and Brazilian airlines agreed to establish regular flights between their respective capitals. An economic cooperation committee subsequently formed in 2010.

Trade between the two countries has grown significantly since the early 2000s. In 2003, bilateral trade amounted to just only $37 million. By 2012, bilateral trade volume had surged by 435%, from $199 million in 2007 to over $1 billion. Brazil’s key exports to Qatar include poultry, beef, and vegetables, while Qatar primarily exports fossil fuels and fertilizers. In 2015, Brazil ranked as Qatar’s 18th most important supplier.

== Cultural relations ==
In January 2014, Qatar Museums launched the Qatar–Brazil Year of Culture, an initiative aimed at strengthening cultural ties between the two countries. The inauguration featured Qatari government officials and ambassadors from both nations, with entertainment that included capoeira performances and live music by the Qatar-based Doha Jazz band. Planned events throughout the year included Brazilian film screenings, culinary exhibitions, and art and fashion showcases.

== Diaspora ==
There are around 900 Brazilian citizens living in Qatar as of 2014.

== Resident diplomatic missions ==
- Brazil has an embassy in Doha.
- Qatar has an embassy in Brasília.

== See also ==
- Foreign relations of Brazil
- Foreign relations of Qatar
