= Armenians in Qatar =

Total population
- 800-5,500

Regions with significant populations
- Doha

Languages
- Armenian, Arabic

Religion
- Armenian Apostolic Church

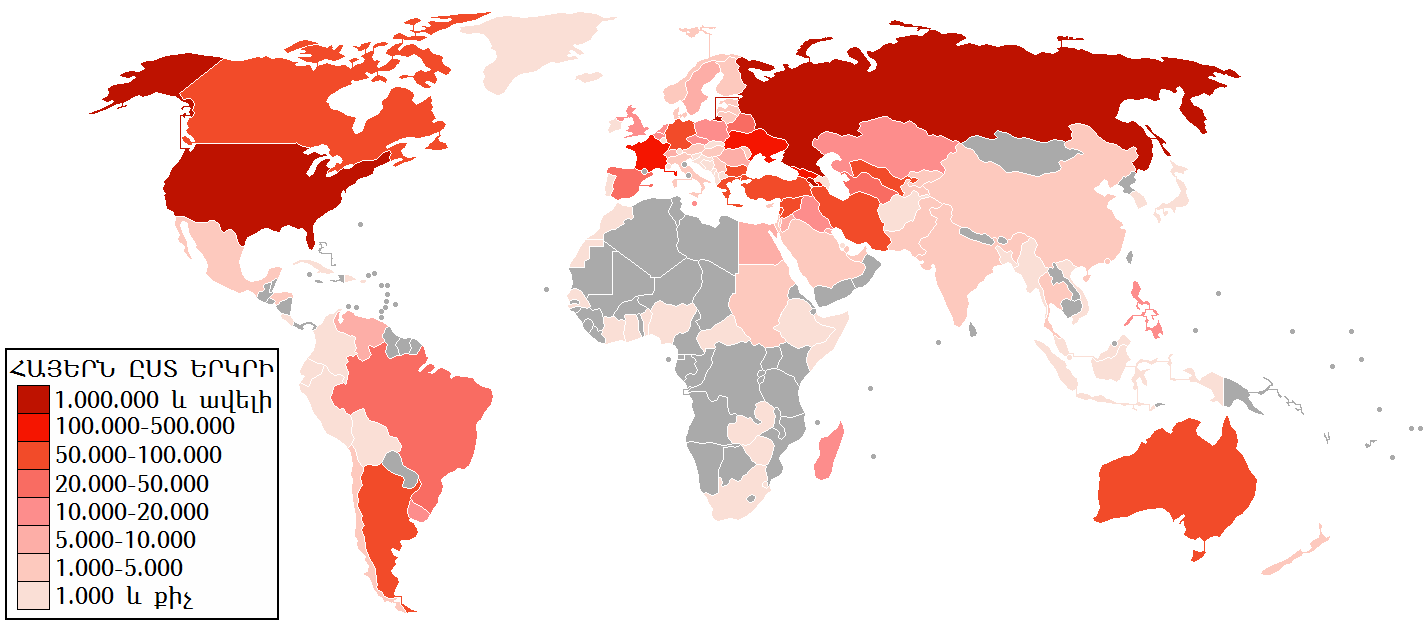
Armenian diaspora map in Armenian

Ethnic Armenians in Qatar number between 800 and 1,500 and live mainly in the capital Doha. Unofficial sources place them at around 5,500.

Many Armenians originating from Lebanon, Syria and other Arab countries were attracted by the economic opportunities provided by Qatar, and they came to Qatar for jobs. Since the 1990s, economic migrants to Qatar have included people from Armenia and Armenians from Russia.

== Religion ==
Armenians in Qatar are Christian, the majority of them belong to the Armenian Apostolic Church and are under the jurisdiction of the Holy See of Cilicia.

The Catholicossate of the Great House of Cilicia (also known as the Holy See of Cilicia) has established the "Diocese of Kuwait and the Arabian Gulf Countries" headquartered in Kuwait, but also serving the Armenians in the Persian Gulf including Qatar.

== See also ==
- Armenia–Qatar relations
- Armenian diaspora
- Armenians in the Middle East
- Armenians in Lebanon
- Armenians in Syria
