= Italy–Qatar relations =

- Qatar: Italy

Italy–Qatar relations are the bilateral relations between Italy and Qatar. Italy has an embassy in Doha and Qatar has an embassy in Rome.

== Diplomatic visits ==
Then Qatari Emir Hamad bin Khalifa Al-Thani visited Italy on an official capacity in July 2005 and April 2012.

Italian President Giorgio Napolitano became Italy's first-ever leader to visit Qatar in November 2007. He held discussions with Qatar's emir over Iran's nuclear program and ways in which to boost bilateral relations.

A meeting was held between Qatari Emir Tamim bin Hamad Al Thani and Italian Prime Minister Paolo Gentiloni in November 2017 to discuss diplomatic relations and the recent Qatar diplomatic crisis.

On 14 June 2023, Qatari Emir Sheikh Tamim bin Hamad Al Thani attended the funeral of former Italian Prime Minister Silvio Berlusconi and described him as a friend of Qatar, who was invested in developing the bilateral relationship between the countries.

== Political cooperation ==
Both countries opened embassies in each other's capitals in 1992. They signed a technology and economy agreement in 1996.

== COVID-19 pandemic ==
During the COVID-19 pandemic, Qatar provided urgent medical assistance to Italy in April 2020. The Qatari Emiri Air Force delivered two field hospitals with a capacity of 1,000 beds equipped for treatment of people with COVID-19.

== Economic relations ==
Trade turnover between Qatar and Italy have dropped in recent years. It was at its highest in 2012 when it reached €3.4 billion. By 2016, this figure decreased to €1.75 billion. This is attributed to less imports of Italian goods into Qatar and a lower demand of Qatari hydrocarbons by Italy, which constitute most of Qatar's exports to the country. Nonetheless, bilateral trade volume is still relatively high, with Italy being Qatar's 7th largest supplier.

In 2017, the value of Qatari investments in Italy was at roughly €2 billion and was mostly centered in Italy's tourism industry.

On 23 October 2023, Italy’s Eni SpA signed a 27-year liquefied natural gas deal with QatarEnergy.

== Military relations ==
Qatar is an important customer for Italy's defense industry. Italian shipbuilding company Fincantieri reached a €4 billion agreement with Qatar's government in June 2016 to construct vessels for its navy. Also included in the deal were support services and construction of a dock. In August 2017, Qatar purchased seven navy ships from Italy at a cost of €5 billion. A massive deal was concluded between Qatar and defense company Leonardo S.p.A. in March 2018 in which Qatar would buy 28 NH90 helicopters along with flight simulators for these helicopters. Shortly after the deal, Qatar and Italy carried out joint naval exercises in the Persian Gulf.

In 2024, Fincantieri signed a Memorandum of Understanding with Qatar's BQ Solutions to develop Italian-led training programs for the Qatar Emiri Naval Forces. The agreement, announced during the MILIPOL Qatar conference, builds on Fincantieri’s existing contract with Qatar, expanding training and operational support for Qatari naval personnel.

== Cultural relations ==
Cultural collaboration agreements have been signed between the two countries first in January 2007, effective starting October 2011, and in January 2016, effective from 2016 to 2018.

The Italian Embassy in Doha is active in organizing cultural events in Qatar, mostly at the Katara Cultural Village. There was an Italian presence at both the 1st Katara European Jazz Festival and 2nd Katara European Jazz Festival in 2014 and 2015, respectively. In January 2016, as part of the cultural collaboration agreement signed that month, the Italian Embassy hosted the "Pesci fuor d’acqua" (Fish Out of Water) photo gallery in Katara.

== Italian Embassy ==
The Italian embassy is located in Doha.

- Ambassador Alessandro Prunas

== Qatari Embassy ==
The Qatari embassy is located in Rome.

- Ambassador Abdul Aziz Ahmad Al-Maliki Juhani

== Migration ==
There are approximately 8,000 Italian citizens living in Qatar as of 2023.

== See also ==
- Foreign relations of Italy
- Foreign relations of Qatar
