= Qatar–South Africa relations =

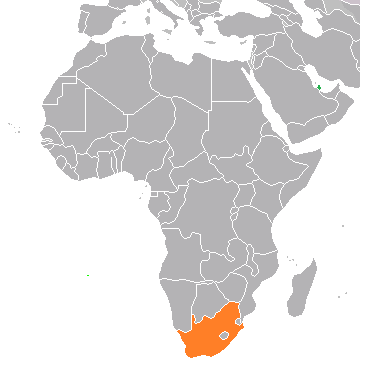

- Qatar: South Africa

Qatar–South Africa relations are the bilateral relations between the State of Qatar and the Republic of South Africa. Formal relations began on 10 May 1994, the same day that Nelson Mandela was sworn in as President of South Africa.

== Diplomatic representation ==
Qatar opened an embassy in the suburb of Brooklyn in Pretoria in January 2003. South Africa's embassy in Doha was established in September 2002.

== High level visits ==
President Nelson Mandela made his first visit to Qatar in April 1995. The first Qatari head of state to visit South Africa was Hamad bin Khalifa Al-Thani, who did so in May 2002.

Qatar was visited by South African President Jacob Zuma twice in 2012; the first visit coming in January followed by a visit in May. Emir Tamim bin Hamad Al Thani made a trip to South Africa in April 2017.

== Diplomatic cooperation ==
=== Economic ===
The Qatar–South Africa Business Forum was established to facilitate trade discussions between the two countries.

In 2016, South African exports to Qatar were valued at $104 million while Qatari exports to South Africa were worth $390 million. Qatar's primary exports are chemicals and plastics while South Africa's chief exports are machinery, mechanical appliances and metals.

South Africa has invested close to $8.9 billion in Qatar's energy sector. Notably, South African chemical company Sasol has entered in a joint venture with QatarEnergy to establish Oryx GTL, a large-scale GTL plant in Ras Laffan, Qatar. Furthermore, in 2003, South Africa's PetroWorld and QatarEnergy agreed to jointly develop a massive methanol project in Ras Laffan.

=== Military ===
In 1991, Qatar purchased 12 G5 howitzers from South Africa.

It was reported in November 2017 that South Africa was in negotiations with Qatar over the sale of a stake in South African defense company Denel.

=== Sports ===
South Africa, hosts of the 2010 FIFA World Cup, has expressed its willingness to share its expertise and skills in regards to Qatar's hosting of the 2022 FIFA World Cup.

== Migration ==
There are roughly 5,000 South Africans living in Qatar as of 2016.

== Resident diplomatic missions ==
- Qatar has an embassy in Pretoria.
- South Africa has an embassy in Doha.

== See also ==
- Foreign relations of South Africa
- Foreign relations of Qatar
