= Qatar–Spain relations =

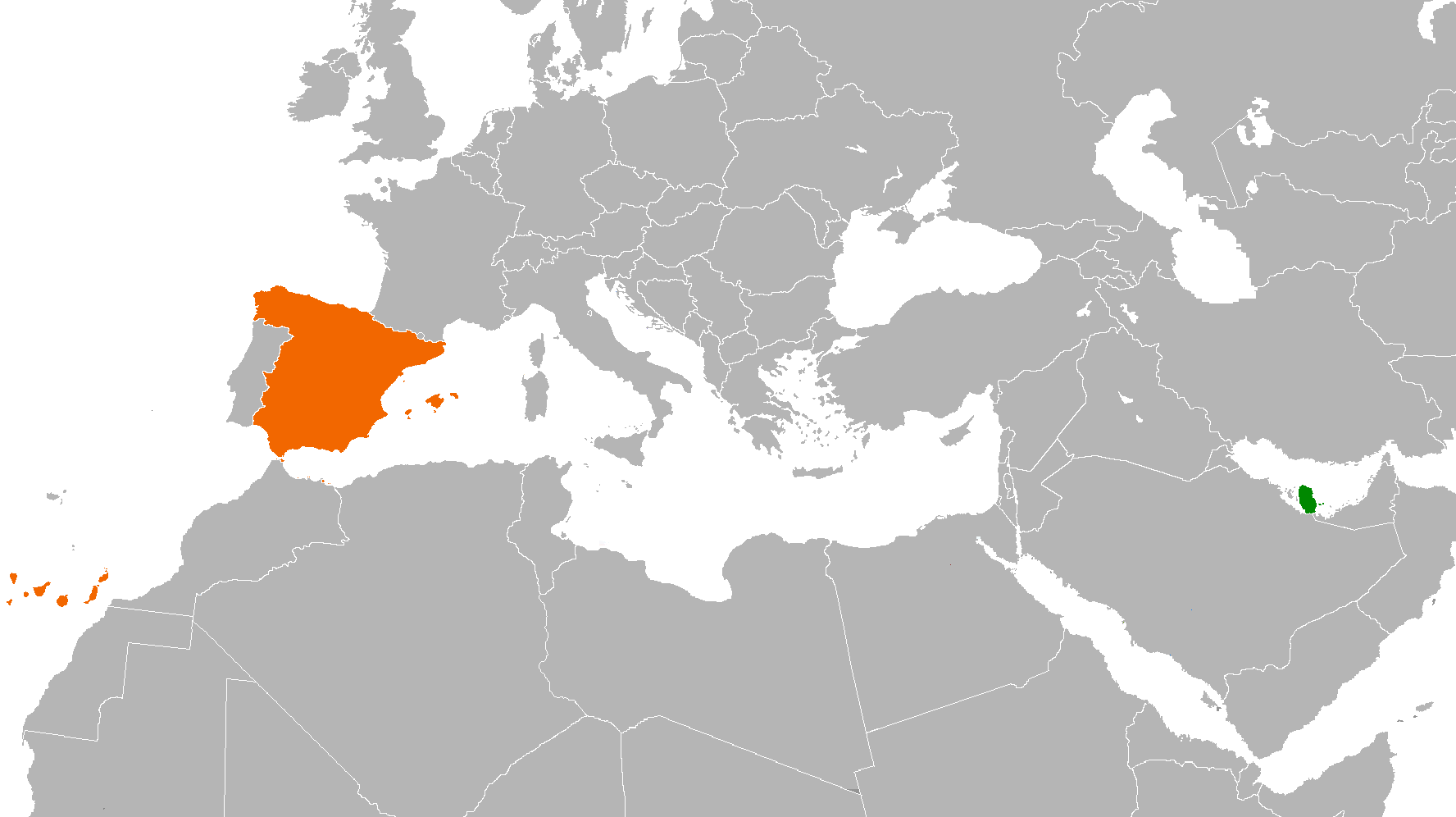

- Qatar: Spain

The State of Qatar and the Kingdom of Spain formed diplomatic relations in December 1972. Qatar maintains an embassy in Madrid, while Spain has an embassy in Doha.

Qatar opened its embassy in Madrid in 1981. After temporarily closing in 1999, the embassy was reinstated in 2004. Spain's embassy in Doha was established in 2003.

== Diplomatic visits ==
Juan Carlos I of Spain was the first Spanish head of state to visit Qatar, doing so in 1980. He also visited in November 2003 in order to inaugurate the newly constructed Spanish embassy. Emir Hamad bin Khalifa Al-Thani made a return visit to Spain in September 2004.

Spanish King Juan Carlos I made his third visit to Qatar in April 2006. He toured Doha's historical Souq Waqif.

On two separate occasions in 2010 and 2011, Emir Hamad bin Khalifa visited Spain to meet with Prime Minister José Luis Rodríguez Zapatero.

== Economic relations ==
In 2010, Qatar was the third most important supplier of natural gas for Spain, with transactions reaching €1.2 billion. During the same period, there were around seventeen Spanish companies with active operations in Qatar.

The Qatari government purchased a 5% stake in Banco Santander's Brazilian branch for a reported $2.7 billion in October 2010.

In the aftermath of a trip to Doha by José Luis Rodríguez Zapatero in February 2011, Qatar pledged to invest €300 million in Spain through the Qatar Investment Authority. During the meeting, the two countries also signed economic and transport agreements. Two months later in April 2011, both countries signed agreements on air transport, security and the creation of a Qatari–Spanish Business Council.

Direct foreign investment between the countries is low. In 2014, the value of Spanish direct foreign investments in Qatar stood at €102 million, while Qatari foreign direct investments in Spain amounted to €90 million. The situation improved over the following years due to increased investment in Spain by Qatar Airways.

Trade turnover was €854 million in 2016. The following year, the trade volume was valued at over €1 billion, increasing by 37%. Qatar's exports are mainly fossil fuels, while Spain's chief exports are mechanical appliances, clothing and furniture.

The Qatar Financial Centre held a workshop on Qatari-Spanish business ties in April 2018, shortly after the signing of a bilateral agreement on the avoidance of double taxation. Over 70 representatives of Qatari and Spanish companies took part in the workshop.

On 18 May 2022, during a two-day visit to Spain, Emir Tamim bin Hamad Al Thani met with Spanish King Felipe VI and Prime Minister Pedro Sánchez. Tamim announced a US$5 billion investment of Qatar Investment Authority into Spanish technology and environmental projects. In addition, both countries signed mutual agreements regarding science and education, military cooperation, and health.

== Cultural relations ==
The Qatari Embassy in Madrid is responsible for arranging cultural activities in Spain. It has organized four Qatari cultural weeks, during which concerts and exhibitions were organized to showcase Qatar's culture.

== Resident diplomatic missions ==
- Qatar has an embassy in Madrid and a consulate-general in Barcelona.
- Spain has an embassy in Doha.
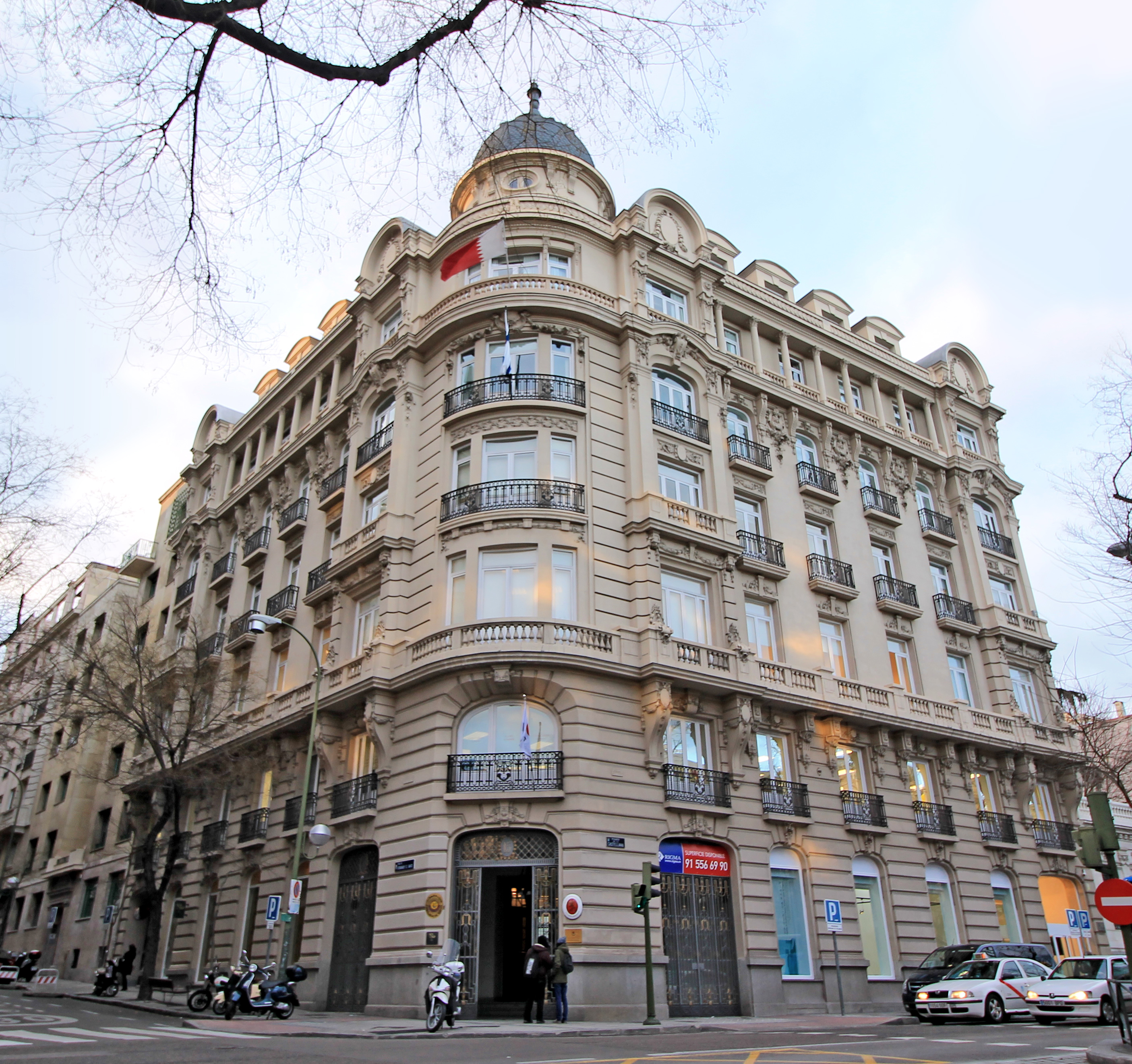
Embassy of Qatar in Madrid

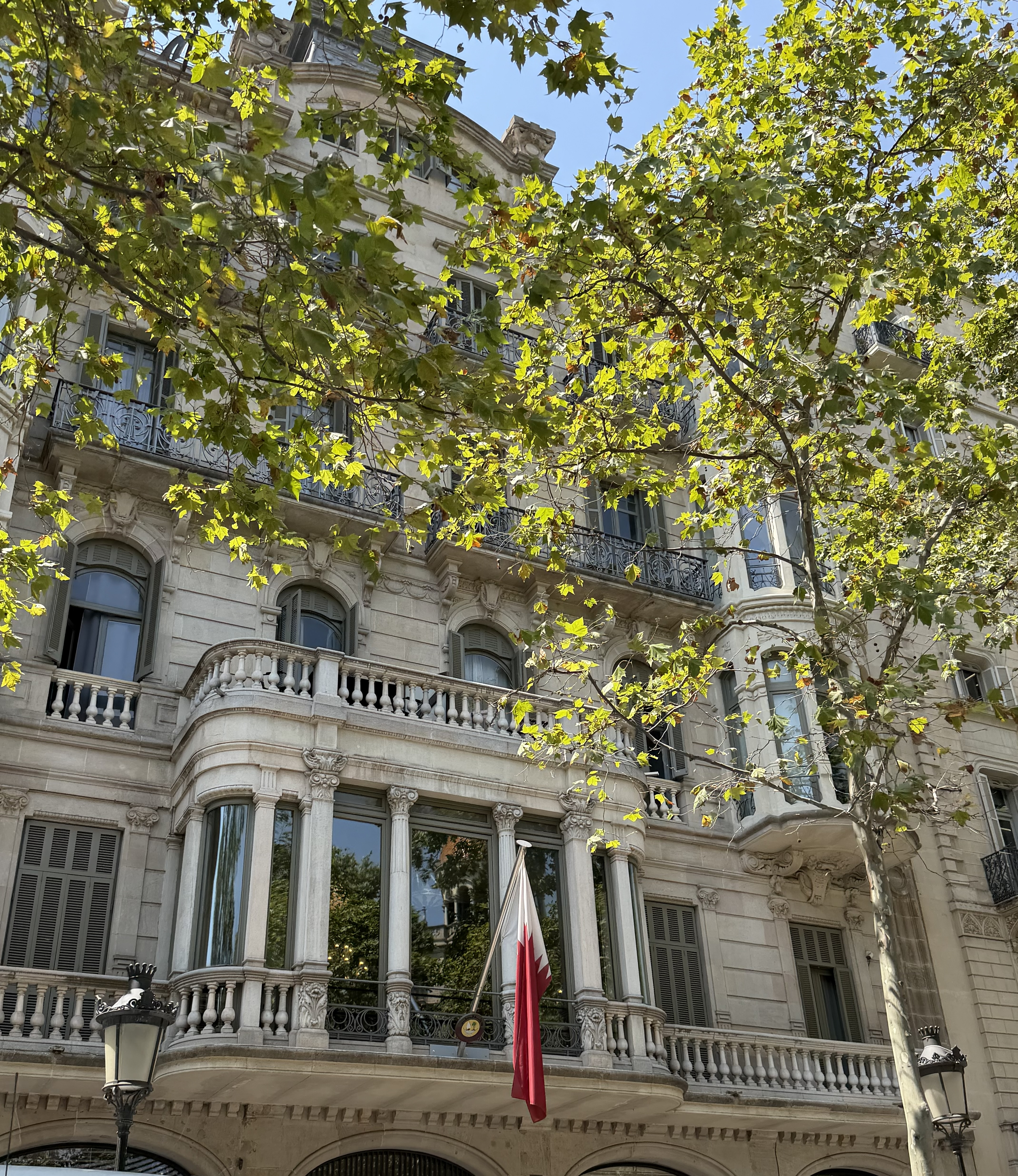
Consulate-General of Qatar in Barcelona

== See also ==
- Foreign relations of Qatar
- Foreign relations of Spain
