= Qatar–Sweden relations =

- Qatar: Sweden

Qatar–Sweden Relations are the bilateral relations between the Kingdom of Sweden and the State of Qatar. The relations are based on trade between the countries.

Sweden has an embassy in West Bay in Doha, Qatar and the ambassador of Sweden to Qatar is Gautam Bhattacharyya. The embassy opened on May 14, 2014.

Qatar has an embassy in Stockholm, Sweden and the ambassador of Qatar to Sweden is Nadya bint Ahmad Al Sheebi.

== Economic relations ==
It was pointed out by the State Secretary of the Minister of Foreign Affairs in Sweden in June 2022 that the volume of trade between the two countries is constantly developing, as Swedish exports to Qatar rose from QR556 million in 2020 to about QR1.112 billion in 2021. The Chairman of Qatar Chamber of Commerce and Industry, also lauded the flourishing relations between Qatar and Sweden on May 29, 2024, underscoring the substantial increase of 79% in trade volume from QR866 million in 2022 to QR1.55 billion in 2023.

The main products exported from Qatar to Sweden are refined petroleum, ethylene polymers, and video recording equipment. Meanwhile, the main products exported from Sweden to Qatar are iron ore, iron pipes, and gas turbines. Qatar has the 31st highest trade volume with Sweden among all countries globally.

The economic relations between the countries are based on cooperation between Swedish and Qatari companies, mainly in the oil and the natural gas sector as well as the wood and iron industries.

In September 2025, Qatar and Sweden signed an agreement establishing a joint business council to deepen private sector cooperation and to expand investment and trade links.

== See also ==
- Foreign relations of Qatar
- Foreign relations of Sweden
