= Philippines–Qatar relations =

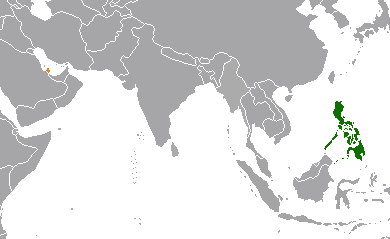

- Philippines: Qatar

Diplomatic mission
- Embassy of the Republic of the Philippines, Doha: Embassy of the State of Qatar, Makati

Envoy
- Ambassador Mardomel Celo D. Melicor: Ambassador Ahmed bin Saad Al Homidi

The Philippines–Qatar relations refers to the bilateral relations between the Republic of the Philippines and State of Qatar

== History ==
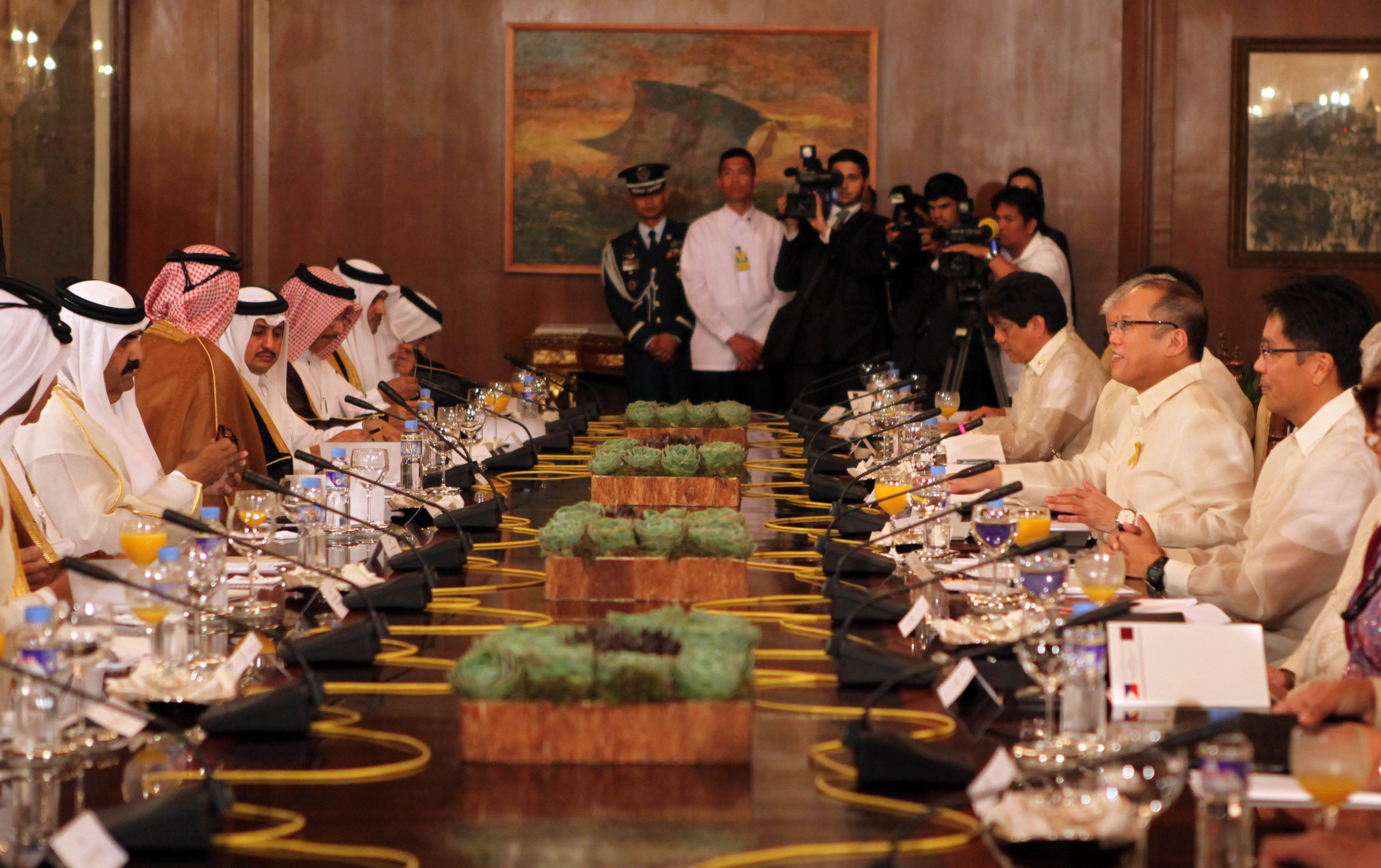
Bilateral meeting between Sheik Hamad bin Khalifa Al Thani and President Benigno Aquino III, August 10, 2012

Diplomatic relations between the Philippines and Qatar formally began on May 5, 1981. The Philippines maintained relations with Qatar through its embassy in the United Arab Emirates until May 1992, when it opened an embassy in Doha.

== Economic relations ==
Qatar serves as the third-largest destination for Overseas Filipino Workers (OFW). There are approximately 250,000 OFW's staying in Qatar or about 17 percent of Qatar's 2.7 million population. A number of them are employed in construction, tourism, information technology, telecommunications, hotels, banks, and as domestic helpers. There are also 44 Filipino organisations in Doha.

== See also ==
- Foreign relations of the Philippines
- Foreign relations of Qatar
