= Greece–Qatar relations =

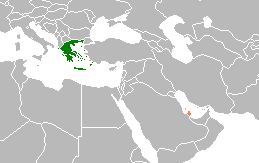

- Greece: Qatar

Greece–Qatar relations are the bilateral relations between Greece and Qatar. Relations were established in 1973.

== Diplomatic representation ==
Greece opened its embassy in Doha in 2007. Qatar has had an embassy in Athens since 2008.

After Egypt closed its embassy in Qatar in 2017, the Greek embassy in Doha agreed to diplomatically represent Egyptian citizens.

== Diplomatic visits ==
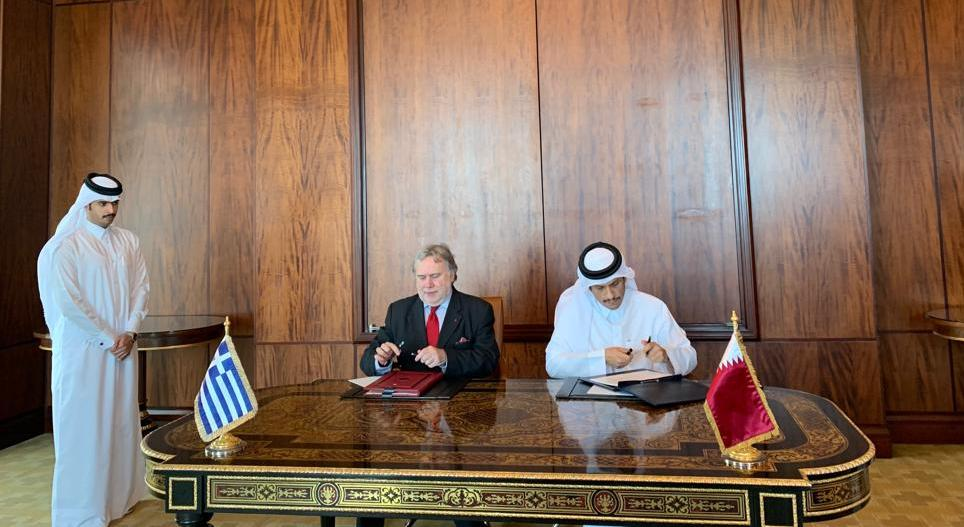
Greek FM Georgios Katrougalos signing agreements with his Qatari counterpart, Mohammed bin Abdulrahman Al Thani.

In March 2009, Greek Deputy Prime Minister Theodoros Pangalos paid a visit to Qatar.

On May 29, 2024, Emir Tamim bin Hamad Al Thani met with PM Kyriakos Mitsotakis in Athens. During the visit, two cooperation agreements were signed: one between the Hellenic Ministry of National Defense and the Ministry of Defense of Qatar, and another between the Greek Ministry of Foreign Affairs and the Qatari Ministry of Foreign Affairs.

== Military relations ==
Several military agreements between Qatar and Greece have been signed, such as an agreement on joint training exercises and a tripartite memorandum of understanding between Qatar's government, the Hellenic Vehicle Industry and the Hellenic Aerospace Industry.

== Economic relations ==
Both countries signed a deal on the avoidance of double taxation in 2008. Qatar signed an agreement in 2010 in which it would invest $5 billion in Greece over the following years.

In January 2013, Qatar Investment Authority's real estate arm Qatari Diar had been involved in a bid to redevelop Ellinikon International Airport but decided to withdraw from the tender. Later that month, the company recanted its withdrawal after a visit to Doha by Prime Minister Antonis Samaras. Furthermore, during the visit, the Qatari government agreed to create a $1.34 billion joint fund to assist small-to-medium businesses in Greece to aid its recession-struck economy. Also in 2013, another section of the Qatar Investment Authority, Qatar Holding, invested €1.2 billion in northern Greece's gold mining industry.

Former Emir of Qatar Hamad bin Khalifa Al-Thani purchased six islets in Greece for a sum of €8.5 million in 2013. He was reportedly interested in constructing a massive palace on one of the islets, but would be challenged by the Greek legal system due to its laws regarding the size of residences.

A joint business council was established in 2015. Trade turnover is low. In 2017, the total bilateral trade volume was $372 million.

In terms of cooperation between companies, Greek company Anangel Maritime Services signed a joint venture agreement with Qatar-based Nakilat to employ ten of its ships to transport LNG. There were approximately seven Greek companies operating in Qatar in 2017.

== Migration ==
According to the Qatari Ministry of Interior, there are 2,200 Greek migrants in Qatar as of 2016.

== Cultural relations ==
In April 2021, a replica of the Charioteer of Delphi was unveiled at Doha Metro station.

== See also ==
- Foreign relations of Greece
- Foreign relations of Qatar
