= List of diplomatic missions in Qatar =

This is a list of diplomatic missions in Qatar. The capital, Doha, hosts 129 embassies. Several other countries are accredited to Qatar from other capitals.

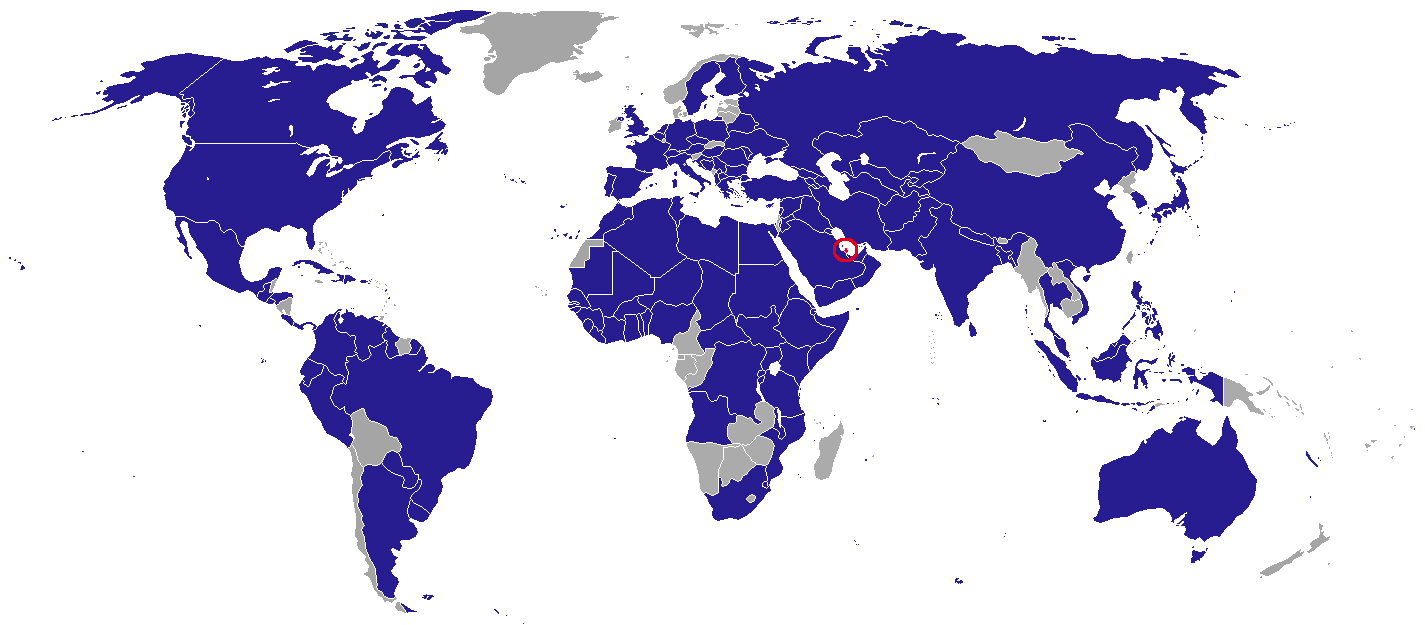
Map of countries that maintain diplomatic missions in Qatar

== Embassies in Doha ==
1. Afghanistan
2. Albania
3. Algeria
4. Angola
5. Argentina
6. Armenia
7. Australia
8. Austria
9. Azerbaijan
10. Bahrain
11. Bangladesh
12. Belarus
13. Belgium
14. Benin
15. Bosnia and Herzegovina
16. Brazil
17. Brunei
18. Bulgaria
19. Burkina Faso
20. Burundi
21. Canada
22. Central African Republic
23. Chad
24. China
25. Colombia
26. Congo-Kinshasa
27. Costa Rica
28. Croatia
29. Cuba
30. Cyprus
31. Czech Republic
32. Djibouti
33. Dominican Republic
34. Ecuador
35. Egypt
36. El Salvador
37. Eritrea
38. Eswatini
39. Ethiopia
40. Finland
41. France
42. Gambia
43. Georgia
44. Germany
45. Ghana
46. Greece
47. Guatemala
48. Guinea
49. Guinea Bissau
50. Guyana
51. Haiti
52. Honduras
53. Hungary
54. India
55. Indonesia
56. Iran
57. Iraq
58. Italy
59. Ivory Coast
60. Japan
61. Jordan
62. Kazakhstan
63. Kenya
64. Kosovo
65. Kuwait
66. Kyrgyzstan
67. Lebanon
68. Liberia
69. Libya
70. Malawi
71. Malaysia
72. Maldives
73. Mali
74. Malta
75. Mauritania
76. Mexico
77. Moldova
78. Morocco
79. Mozambique
80. Nepal
81. Netherlands
82. Niger
83. Nigeria
84. North Macedonia
85. Oman
86. Pakistan
87. Palestine
88. Panama
89. Paraguay
90. Peru
91. Philippines
92. Poland
93. Portugal
94. Romania
95. Russia
96. Rwanda
97. Saudi Arabia
98. Senegal
99. Serbia
100. Sierra Leone
101. Singapore
102. Somalia
103. South Africa
104. South Korea
105. South Sudan
106. Spain
107. Sri Lanka
108. Sudan
109. Sweden
110. Switzerland
111. Syria
112. Tajikistan
113. Tanzania
114. Thailand
115. Togo
116. Tunisia
117. Turkey
118. Turkmenistan
119. Uganda
120. Ukraine
121. United Arab Emirates
122. United Kingdom
123. United States
124. Uruguay
125. Uzbekistan
126. Venezuela
127. Vietnam
128. Yemen
129. Zambia

== Other missions or delegations ==
- European Union (Delegation)
- Northern Cyprus (Representative Office)

== Gallery ==
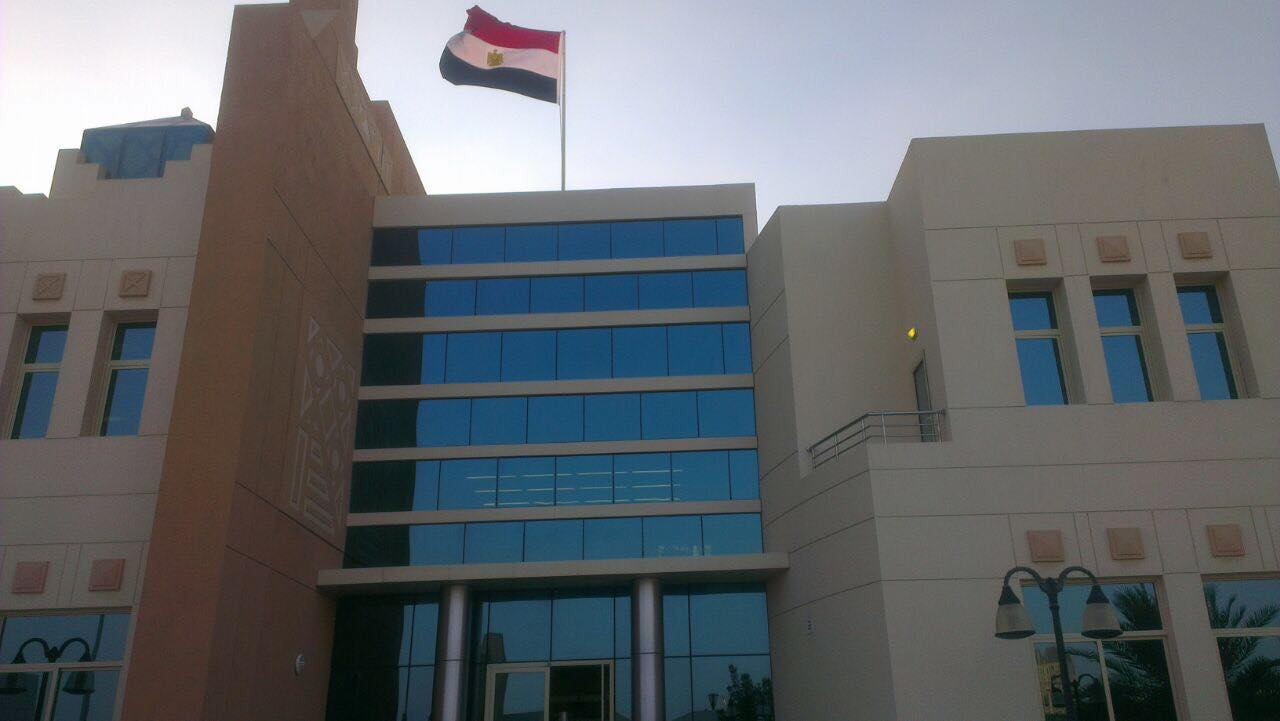
Embassy of Egypt

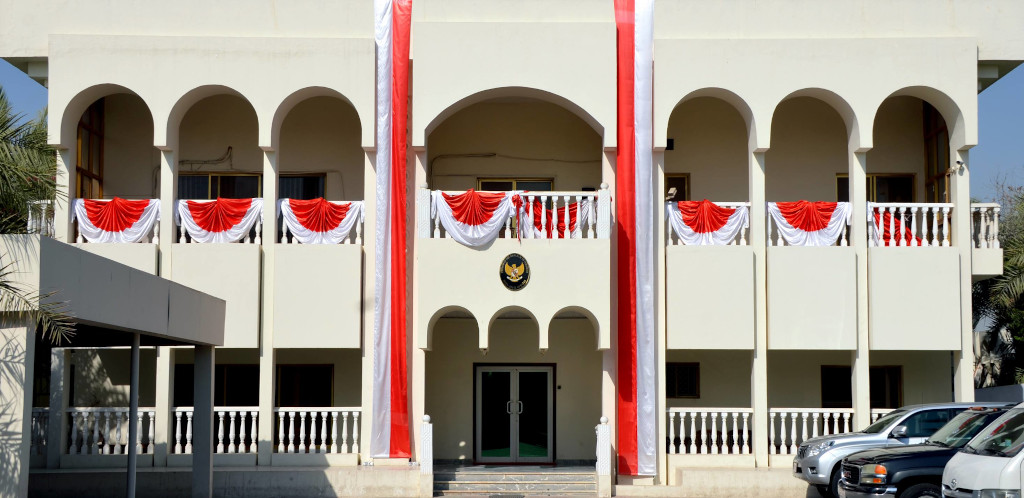
Embassy of Indonesia

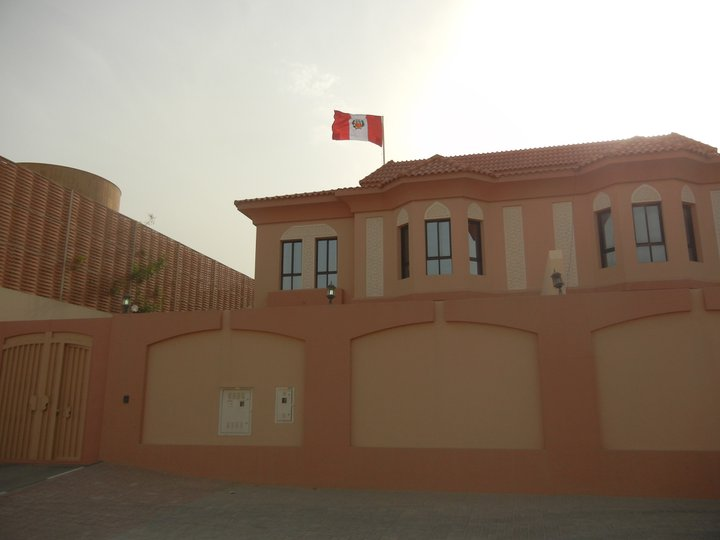
Embassy of Peru

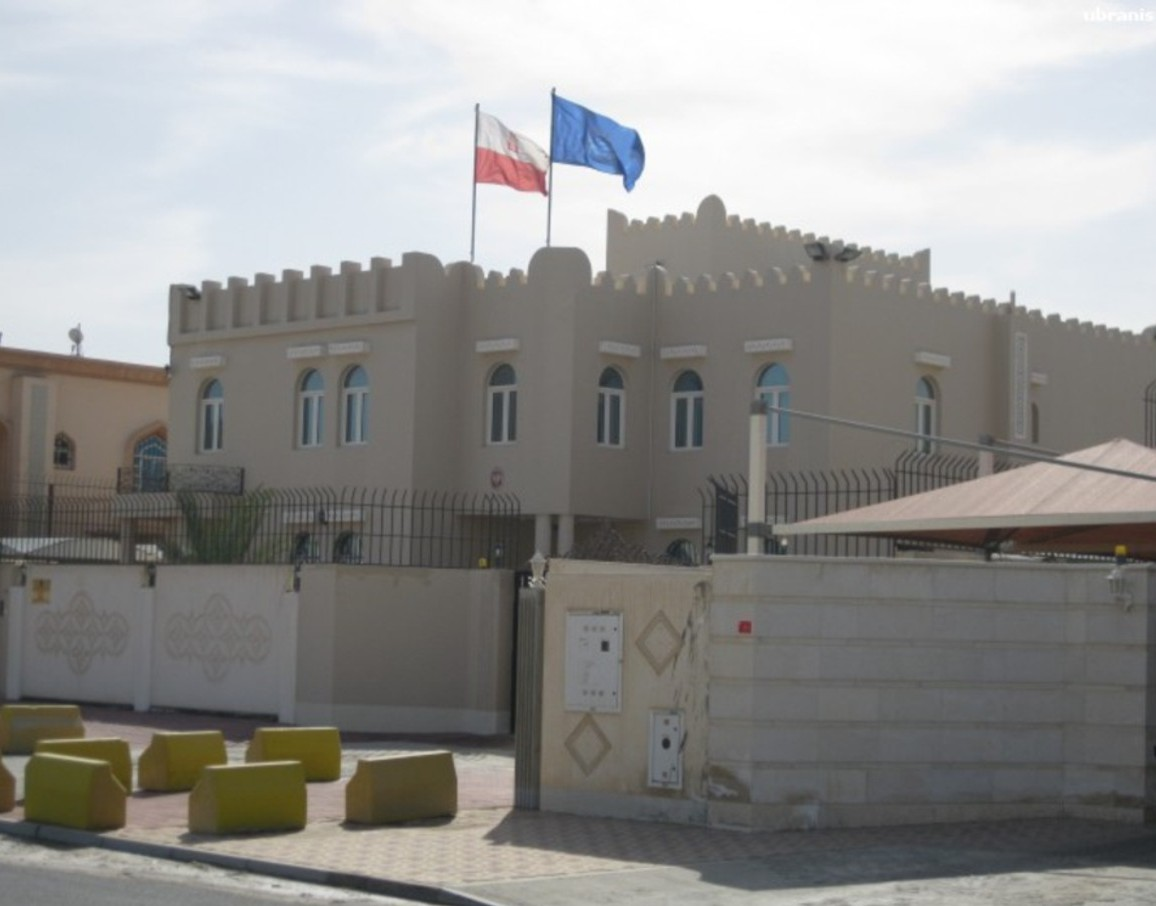
Embassy of Poland

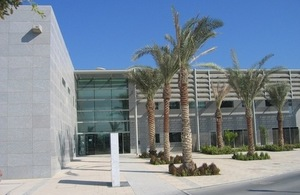
Embassy of the United Kingdom

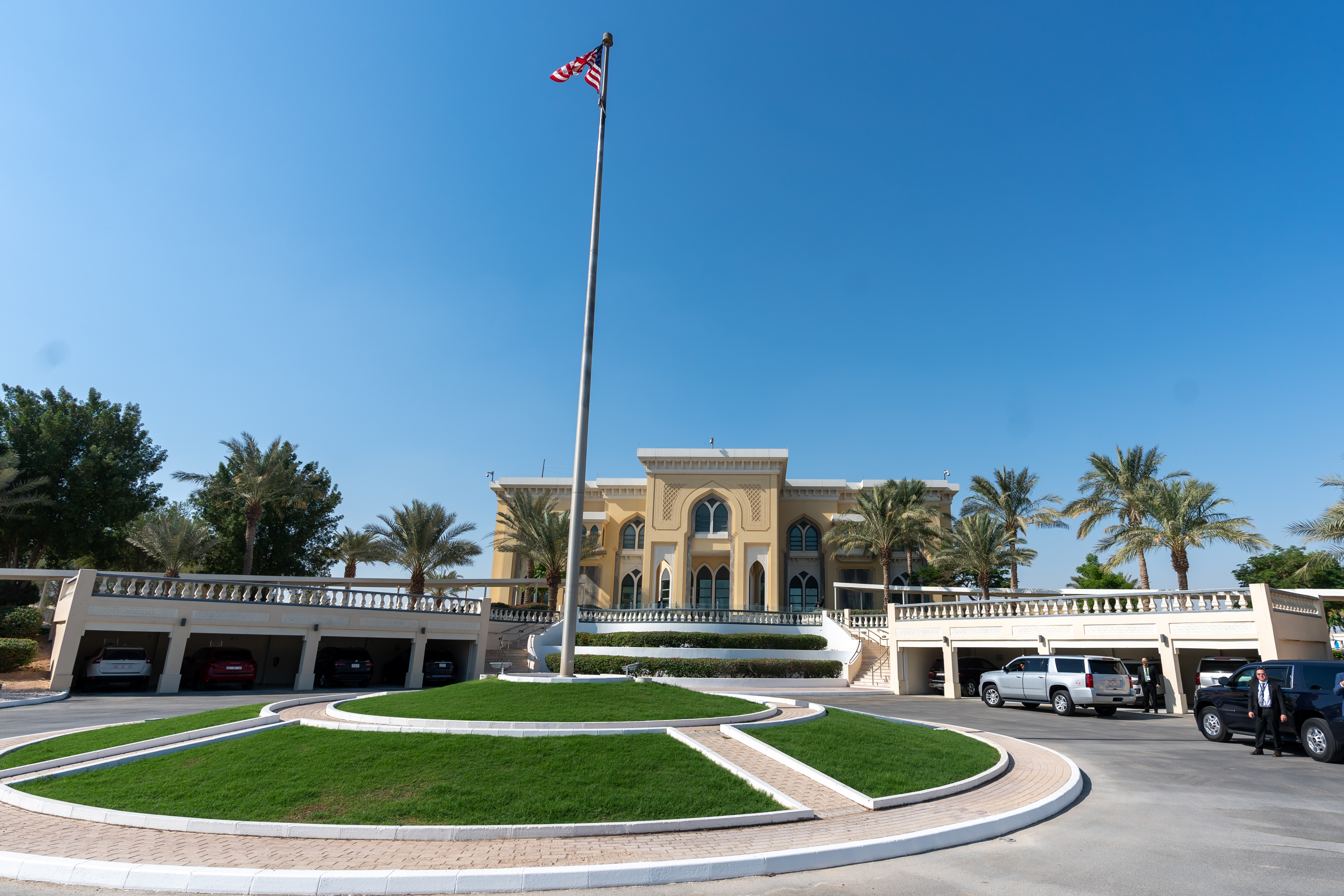
Embassy of the United States

== Accredited embassies ==
Resident in Riyadh unless otherwise noted

- Bhutan (Kuwait City)
- Botswana (Kuwait City)
- Cambodia (Kuwait City)
- Cameroon
- Chile (Abu Dhabi)
- Congo (Cairo)
- Denmark (Abu Dhabi)
- Equatorial Guinea (Riyadh)
- Fiji (Abu Dhabi)
- Gabon
- Laos (Kuwait City)
- Lesotho (Kuwait City)
- Lithuania (Cairo)
- Mongolia (Kuwait City)
- New Zealand (Abu Dhabi)
- Nicaragua (Kuwait City)
- North Korea (Kuwait City)
- Norway (Abu Dhabi)
- San Marino (Madrid)
- Seychelles (Abu Dhabi)
- Slovakia (Kuwait City)
- Slovenia (Cairo)
- Zimbabwe (Kuwait City)

== Former Embassies ==
Comoros (Doha) (Embassy) (Closed 7 June 2017)

== See also ==
- Foreign relations of Qatar
- Visa requirements for Qatari citizens
