= Comoros–Qatar relations =

- Qatar: Comoros

Comoros–Qatar relations are the bilateral relations between the Comoros and Qatar.

== Diplomatic representation ==
Qatar established an embassy in Moroni, Comoros in 2014. The country's inaugural ambassador to Comoros, Mubarak bin Abdulrahman Al Nasser, presented his credentials to the president of Comoros in November 2014.

Comoros maintains an embassy in Doha, Qatar. It appointed its first ambassador to Qatar, Hadji Abdallah Abdoulhamid, in January 2014. His tenure ended in January 2016.

Qatar expelled Comoros' representatives in the country on 19 June 2017, after it severed ties with Doha, giving them 48 hours to leave the country.

== High level visits ==
On 22 April 2010, Emir Hamad bin Khalifa Al-Thani became the first Arab head of state to pay an official visit to Comoros. While there, he extended an offer of 20 million euros to the Comoros government for it to pay the salaries of its civil servants. President Ahmed Sambi confirmed that the money was deposited into the Comoros central bank in May 2010.

== Diplomatic relations ==
=== 2017 Qatari diplomatic crisis ===
On 7 June 2017, Comoros cut ties with Qatar, following the lead of several other countries led by a quartet composed of Saudi Arabia, Bahrain, Egypt and the United Arab Emirates. Shortly after, there were some demonstrations held in the Comoros capital of Moroni which protested against this decision. Five members of the Comoros-Qatar Friendship Association were arrested by Comoran authorities on 19 June, but were released after 24 hours.

Former president Ahmed Sambi condemned the decision to sever ties, saying that Qatar was a "friendly country".

=== Foreign aid and investments ===
Qatar hosted a donors conference in March 2010, during which $540 million was pledged for the development of Comoros by Arab-based donors. Qatari-based organizations pledged $200 million towards Comoros' development during the conference. In the aftermath of the conference, Qatar National Hotels Company, a government-owned organization, signed a deal with the Comoran government to build a $70 million hotel resort in Comoros in April 2010.

Qatar Charity became the first philanthropic organization to open a field office in Moroni, the capital city of Comoros, in 2010. At a meeting held by the Arab Committee for Development and Investment in the Comoros in February 2011, Qatar Charity stated that it was executing QR10 million worth of projects, and said it would donate an additional QR55 million towards social development, education and health projects within the upcoming years. In the following years, Qatar Charity spent QR2 million on refurbishing health clinics and schools in Mohéli.

Jassim and Hamad bin Jassim Charitable Foundation announced it would be constructing a $37 million hospital in Anjouan in 2011. Furthermore, the organization launched a QR4 million cultural complex in Comoros in September 2014. The complex was planned to feature Arabic as well as local Comoran architectural elements.

Following Comoros' severing of ties with Qatar in June 2017, local media reported that two local Qatari charities, RAF and Qatar Charity, were suspending their activities in the country. Reports also claimed that the $37 million under-construction hospital in Anjouan was put on hold for the time being. It was presumed by Comoran media that the cessation of philanthropic projects by Qatar was a retaliatory measure against Comoros' alignment with the Saudi-led quartet in their diplomatic spat.
