= Morocco–Qatar relations =

- Qatar: Morocco

The Kingdom of Morocco and the State of Qatar formed diplomatic relations in 1972. There is substantial economic cooperation between the two countries, with Qatar being one of the largest foreign investors in Morocco. A $2 billion joint venture between Qatar's sovereign wealth fund and Morocco was established in 2011.

Politically, Qatar supports Moroccan claims on Western Sahara, although political relations have historically been sporadic due to Qatar's cordial relations with Algeria and perceived biases perpetuated by its global news corporation, Al Jazeera. During the 2017 Qatari diplomatic crisis, Morocco offered to mediate the dispute, and even sent humanitarian aid to Qatar, which had been banned from using the land, air and sea routes belonging to several of its neighboring countries.

Morocco has an embassy in Doha and Qatar has an embassy in Rabat. Both countries are members of the Arab League, Organisation of Islamic Cooperation, Group of 77 and Non-Aligned Movement.

== Diplomatic visits ==
King Mohammed VI of Morocco, who assumed power in 1999, made his first official visit to Qatar in June 2002.

Emir Hamad bin Khalifa Al-Thani made his first visit to Morocco in October 2002. In July 2005, he traveled to Morocco for an official two-day visit.

== Diplomatic cooperation ==
=== Western Sahara ===
Qatar has confirmed its support for Morocco over Western Sahara, however their support is sporadic and unstable due to perceived bias news from Al Jazeera and its interview with a number of Sahrawi dissidents opposing Moroccan Government. However, with the Qatar crisis occurred in 2017, Al Jazeera has shifted into a more pro-Moroccan stance, in line with the Qatari Government.

=== Political ===
After Hamad bin Khalifa Al-Thani successfully deposed his father Khalifa bin Hamad Al Thani in 1995, he was not immediately accepted by Hassan II. Qatar had uncertain relations with Morocco in the years proceeding Hamad's succession, mainly due to Qatar's existing relations with Algeria and Al Jazeera's unfavorable coverage of Morocco.

In June 2000, Morocco withdrew its ambassador to Doha in response to Qatar casting a vote for Germany rather than Morocco in the host selection for the 2006 FIFA World Cup. The two countries agreed to resume normal diplomatic relations in October 2000. Nonetheless, relations continued to experience highs and lows. Qatar's purchase of British-made weapons for Algeria was not received well by Rabat, and Moroccan media criticized Qatar-based Al Jazeera for producing programs that were dubbed "anti-Moroccan".

In August 2023, Qatar expressed interest in helping to mediate between Morocco and Algeria. According to a statement by the Qatari Ministry of Foreign Affairs, mending the relationship between the two countries "represents a major concern of the State of Qatar".

==== 2017 Qatari diplomatic crisis ====
On 5 June 2017, a number of states led by Saudi Arabia cut ties with Qatar. Morocco stated that it would remain neutral in the crisis, and on 11 June, extended an offer for mediation of the dispute. On 13 June, Morocco stated that it would send food aid to Qatar amidst its isolation from the sea, air and land routes belonging to the blockading countries. The Moroccan Ministry of Foreign Affairs claimed that the food aid was sent in line with the spirit of the holy month of Ramadan.

Although the Moroccan government has maintained a neutral stance, Morocco's leading party, the Justice and Development Party, proclaimed its support for Qatar in the dispute.

Displeased with Morocco's neutrality, certain media outlets in Saudi Arabia and the UAE, two of the blockading countries, have brought up the issue of Western Saharan independence in an attempt to influence Morocco to support the boycott of Qatar.

=== Foreign aid ===
In December 2013, Qatar pledged $1.25 billion to Morocco in foreign aid. The aid is part of a five-year package deal arranged by four members of the GCC to supply $5 billion worth of aid to Morocco, in an attempt to bolster its political security.

=== Economic ===
A joint venture fund was set up between Morocco and Qatar's sovereign wealth fund in November 2011. It was reportedly valued at $2 billion, with both partners contributing equal funding.

Morocco and Qatar's trade volume was valued at $70 million in 2015.

In 2016, Qatar ranked fifth in direct foreign investment in Morocco.

=== Media ===
In 1981, Qatar and Morocco signed a media agreement which entailed co-operation and exchange of news and data between the two countries' media organizations.

Morocco was selected as host of Al Jazeera's North African news show, Al-Hasad al-Magharibi, in 2006. It was deemed an appropriate venue for the show's base of operations due to Morocco's lenient media laws relative to its neighbors. At the beginning of 2008, Moroccan authorities rescinded the network's permission to broadcast the show in the country under the pretense of technicalities. They then withdrew the accreditation of journalist Hassan Rachidi in June 2008 when he reported on a report released by a Moroccan-based human rights organization. This was followed by the revocation of two more journalists' accreditation in 2009, and in October 2010, the authorities officially revoked the accreditation of all of Al Jazeera's Morocco-based journalists. On 29 October, Morocco announced it would be shutting down all of Al Jazeera's operations in the country. The main reason cited by authorities was the perceived favoritism towards Western Saharan independence. Bilateral relations between the two countries did not suffer from the incident.

In a broadcasting of the 2011 Pan Arab Games by Qatar-based Al Kass Sports Channels, the map displayed on the screen depicting Morocco's territories did not include the disputed Western Sahara due to an alleged technical error. Despite Qatar's previous affirmations recognizing Moroccan sovereignty over Western Sahara, a group of Moroccan hackers launched an operation called 'Moroccan Vengeance', in which they would target websites belonging to the Qatari government. Qatar's 2022 World Cup Facebook page and the official page of the Pan-Arab Games were among the hacked websites.

== Diplomatic missions ==
The Moroccan embassy is located in Doha.

The Qatari embassy is located in Rabat.
