= Qatar–Saudi Arabia diplomatic conflict =

Diplomatic issue between Qatar and Saudi Arabia

- Part of the Iran–Saudi Arabia proxy conflict
- Qatar (center) Countries which have cut off diplomatic ties with Qatar during the Qatar diplomatic crisis Countries which reduced diplomatic ties with or recalled ambassadors from Qatar during Qatar diplomatic crisis Libya. UN/Qatar-backed first and second government opposed by UAE/Egypt-backed government.
Date	2011–2021
Location	Middle East and North Africa, especially Bahrain (from January–March 2011), Egypt (prior to 2013), Yemen (until 2017), Syria and Libya (until 2020)
Result	Relations restored in 2021 Arab Spring proxy conflicts: 2011 Tunisian Revolution sparks Arab Spring. Saudi-led interventions in Bahrain (2011) and Yemen (2015), KSA/UAE-backed military coup in Egypt (2013).; Tunisia: Qatari news outlet Al Jazeera supports the successful ouster of President Zine El Abidine Ben Ali, who flees to Saudi Arabia in January 2011 Tunisian Revolution. Tunisia transitions to a democracy.; Egypt: Al Jazeera's landmark moment is the widespread coverage of the January–February 2011 Egyptian Revolution against President Hosni Mubarak. The next year, pro-Qatar, Muslim Brotherhood-affiliated Mohamed Morsi is democratically-elected president, but is overthrown the next year by a 2013 Egyptian coup d'état supported by the KSA and UAE. Under General Abdel Fattah el-Sisi, Egypt has been a staunch supporter of the KSA and UAE.; Bahrain: A civil uprising of the majority Shia against the Sunni monarchy, covered widely by Al Jazeera, is crushed by Saudi-led intervention on 14 March 2011. Bahrain becomes extremely pro-KSA afterwards.; Libya: Leader Muammar Gaddafi killed following 2011 revolution which saw Qatari and other military intervention on the side of the revolutionary National Transitional Council. Since the civil war escalated in 2014, the KSA/UAE and Qatar have supported rival factions in Libya.; Yemen: Al Jazeera coverage of 2011-2012 protests against President Ali Abdullah Saleh lead to brief mediation by the Gulf Cooperation Council (GCC), until Saleh refuses to resign and briefly goes to KSA for medical care. Saleh is ousted in the Yemeni Revolution in 2012, but reemerges to support the 2014-2015 Houthi takeover in Yemen. Qatar supports the 2015 Saudi Arabian-led intervention in Yemen against the Houthis and Saleh, but is forced by the KSA to withdraw from the conflict in 2017.; Syria: Qatar is the main supporter of the initial peaceful protests against President Bashar al-Assad, alongside Turkey. In 2012, Saudi Arabia involves itself in the resulting civil war as Qatari and Turkish influence grows among the rebels and Assad becomes more dependant on Iran. The KSA and Qatar back rival rebels, benefitting the Assad axis and what in 2014 becomes the Islamic State. In 2015, increased Saudi-Qatari coordination following Salman of Saudi Arabia's ascension to the throne leads to Russian military intervention on Assad's behalf. In 2023, Saudi Arabia and Syria normalized relations. In December 2024, Turkish-Qatari backed rebels overthrew the Assad regime

Main parties post-Arab Spring
Qatar; Turkey; Somalia; Hamas; Muslim Brotherhood: Muslim Brotherhood of Egypt; Syrian Muslim Brotherhood; Support: Iran	Saudi Arabia; United Arab Emirates (from 2013); Bahrain (from 2011); Egypt (from 2013) (Libya) Libyan HoR (from 2014) Support: Jordan (2017–2018); Yemen (2017–2018)^{[a]}; Djibouti (2017–2018); Comoros (2017–2018); Mauritania (2017–2018); Chad (June 2017 – Feb 2018); Somaliland (2016–2018)^{[c]}; Maldives; Senegal (June–Aug 2017); Niger; Gabon

Commanders and leaders
Tamim bin Hamad	Mohammed bin Salman
- Notes: ^{a} The GCC coalition supporting the Aden-based government expelled Qatar in 2017.; ^{b} The GNA government achieved widespread international recognition after it was formed in January 2016, replacing the National Salvation Government.; ^{c} Government is unrecognized by the international community.; ^{d} HTS's predecessor (the Al-Nusra Front) and ISIL's predecessor (ISI) were allied al-Qaeda branches until April 2013. An ISI-proposed merger of the two into ISIL was rejected by the Al-Nusra Front and al-Qaeda cut all affiliation with ISIL in February 2014.; ^{e} Syrian Liberation Front and Tahrir al-Sham's predecessor, the Al-Nusra Front, were allied under the Army of Conquest from March 2015 to January 2017.

The Qatar–Saudi Arabia diplomatic conflict refers to the temporary struggle for regional influence between Qatar and Saudi Arabia, both of which are members of the Gulf Cooperation Council (GCC). It is sometimes called the New Arab Cold War or the Second Arab Cold War. Bilateral relations have been especially strained since the beginning of the Arab Spring, that left a power vacuum both states sought to fill, with Qatar being supportive of the revolutionary wave and Saudi Arabia opposing it. Both states are allies of the United States, and have avoided direct conflict with one another.

Qatar has differences with the Saudi bloc on a number of issues: it broadcasts Al Jazeera, that widely reported the Arab Spring; it maintains relatively good relations with Iran, Saudi Arabia's key rival; and it has supported the Muslim Brotherhood in the past. Saudi Arabia frames the conflict with Qatar as a subset of the Iran–Saudi Arabia proxy conflict due to Saudi Arabia's longstanding concern about the country's relationship with Iran and Iranian-backed militant groups. However, Qatar maintains the conflict is an attempt for Saudi Arabia to reassert the hegemony over Qatar it enjoyed during the 20th century.

The Tunisian Revolution of January 2011 ousted longtime president Zine El Abidine Ben Ali, who fled to Saudi Arabia after being denied asylum in France. Widespread Al Jazeera coverage of the 2011 Bahraini uprising fueled Saudi suspicions the Qatari government sought to overthrow the Saudi government via soft power. The Saudis then supported a largely successful counterrevolution to the Arab Spring to preserve the monarchy of Bahrain, overthrow the Egyptian democratically elected president Mohammad Morsi, and stymie international support for the post-Gaddafi government in Libya. Since the 2013 Egyptian coup d'état by Abdel Fattah el-Sisi, there has been a consistent pattern of Saudi Arabia, the United Arab Emirates, and Egypt opposing the designs of Qatar and Turkey, who supported democratic Islamist and Salafi extremist groups, particularly in the Syrian civil war.

Both Saudi Arabia and Qatar mediated through the GCC during the Yemeni Revolution against President Ali Abdullah Saleh, although Qatar was considered more pro-revolution and KSA more pro-Saleh. Both rivals also backed the overthrow of Syrian president Bashar al-Assad, a key ally of Iran and the Lebanese Hezbollah. Qatari involvement in the Syrian Civil War was initially far greater in 2013 than Saudi involvement, and their backing of rival revolutionary groups benefited the incumbent Assad regime and what would become the Islamic State of Iraq and Syria. In 2014, the two countries backed rival sides in the Second Libyan Civil War, which continues to intensify, and they had even temporarily severed diplomatic relations with each other. When Salman of Saudi Arabia ascended to the throne in 2015, the two began to cooperate more in Syria and fought Houthi militias in the Yemeni civil war. Saudi-Qatari relations were seen near a high point when Qatar severed ties with Iran by recalling its ambassador from Tehran in response to the attack on the Saudi embassy there following the 2016 Saudi execution of Nimr al-Nimr.

In June 2017, Saudi Arabia, the UAE, Bahrain, Egypt, the Maldives, Mauritania, Senegal, Djibouti, the Comoros, Jordan, the Tobruk-based Libyan government and finally the Hadi-led Yemeni government severed diplomatic relations with Qatar and blocked Qatar's airspace and sea routes along with Saudi Arabia blocking the only land crossing over its relations with Iran, Al-Jazeera reporting negative information about other GCC states and Egypt and the country's alleged support of Islamist groups. Qatar was also expelled from the anti-Houthi coalition. Qatar's defense minister Khalid bin Mohammad Al Attiyah called the blockade akin to a bloodless declaration of war, and Qatar's finance minister Ali Sharif Al Emadi stated that Qatar is rich enough to withstand the blockade. On 24 August 2017, Qatar announced that they would restore full diplomatic relations with Iran. As the diplomatic standoff reached its second year, Saudi Arabia announced it would build a canal. Subsequently, this could turn Qatar into an island.

As of June 2024 Saudi Arabia has welcomed the resumption of diplomatic representation between the UAE and Qatar, reflecting continued efforts to stabilize and enhance inter-GCC relations.

== Background ==
=== History ===
Since he took power in 1995, Hamad bin Khalifa al-Thani believed Qatar could find security only by transforming itself from a Saudi appendage to a rival of Saudi Arabia. According to Jim Krane, energy research fellow at Rice University's Baker Institute, "Qatar used to be a kind of Saudi vassal state, but it used the autonomy that its gas wealth created to carve out an independent role for itself... Above all, gas prompted Qatar to promote a regional policy of engagement with Shiite Iran to secure the source of its wealth". Qatar and Iran share ownership of the South Pars/North Dome Gas-Condensate field, by far the world's largest natural gas field, with significant geostrategic influence. To further offset Saudi influence, Qatar is a close ally of the United States, hosting the largest American base in the Middle East, Al Udeid Air Base. Saudi Arabia withdrew its ambassador to Doha from 2002 to 2008 to try to pressure Qatar to curb its individualistic tendencies. This approach broadly failed.

Member states of the Gulf Cooperation Council.

Qatar maintains relatively good relations with Iran. Saudi Arabia often frames the issue as a proxy battle between partners and adversaries of Iran. United Arab Emirates politicians claim that "Qatar invests billions of dollars in the U.S. and Europe and then recycles the profits to support Iranian-aligned Hamas, the Muslim Brotherhood and groups linked to al Qaeda. While Qatar hosts the American military base from which the U.S. directs its regional war against extremism, it also owns media networks responsible for inciting many of the same extremists". Qatar also used its contacts to help negotiate peaceful exchanges of hostages for the safe evacuation of civilians from areas affected by the Syrian Civil War. In 2006, Qatar was the only UN Security Council member to vote against United Nations Security Council Resolution 1696 that called on Iran to halt its nuclear enrichment program.

In April 2017, after a 12-year freeze, Qatar lifted a self-imposed ban on developing the gas field with Iran, that would require cooperation between the two countries. According to David Roberts, a Qatar foreign policy expert at King's College, London, if a conflict erupts between America and Iran, Qatar would literally be caught in the middle. "If you are Qatar, you look across the water and you think, when Iran did have the opportunity to take a few Arab islands, they did it." "Qatar needs to have the ability to peacefully go about their business of sucking all the gas out of that giant field." Iran could make that process very difficult. A senior fellow of Middle Eastern studies at the Council on Foreign Relations concludes that "There's a recognition of the general tendencies of the Gulf states to hedge their bets,"There's always a question in the back of the minds of the leadership--how much faith can they put in the U.S.?"

On 27 May 2017, the newly reelected Iranian President Hassan Rouhani held a phone call with Qatar's Emir Tamim bin Hamad Al Thani. Rouhani told Qatar's emir, "The countries of the region need more cooperation and consultations to resolve the crisis in the region and we are ready to cooperate in this field."

=== Arab Spring and Al Jazeera ===
The Qatari Al-Jazeera is a media organization owned by the Government of Qatar. It is the most popular network in the Middle East, and its news network has criticized principal foreign governments involved in triggering the dispute and been accused of supporting Qatari interests. The Saudi-led coalition against Qatar has demanded that Al-Jazeera be shut down.

=== Terrorism ===
Qatar has been accused of sponsoring terrorism. Some countries have faulted Qatar for funding rebel groups in Syria, including al-Qaeda's affiliate in Syria, the al-Nusra Front, although the Saudis have done the same. Both Qatar and Saudi Arabia have been involved in the CIA–led Timber Sycamore covert operation to train and arm Syrian rebels.

Qatar has hosted officials from the Afghan Taliban and Hamas. Qatar defends this move by saying it is trying to act as an intermediary in regional conflicts by hosting talks between the Taliban and the US-backed Afghan government in 2016.

On 13 July 2017, Bob Corker, a Republican senator and the chairman of the US Senate Committee on Foreign Relations, stated that the "[t]he amount of support for terrorism by Saudi Arabia dwarfs what Qatar is doing". Former US Defense Secretary and ex-CIA chief Robert Gates stated in May 2017 that he does not "know instances in which Qatar aggressively goes after (terror finance) networks of Hamas, Taliban, Al-Qaeda," and that "My attitudes toward Al-Udeid and any other facility is that the United States military doesn't have any irreplaceable facility." Qatar hosts the largest American base in the Middle East, the Al Udeid Air Base, which has been used by the United States in its campaigns in Iraq, Syria and Afghanistan. According to the WSJ, during President Barack Obama's first term, some members of his National Security Council lobbied to pull a U.S. fighter jet squadron out of Al Udeid to protest Qatari support of militant groups in the Middle East.

== Timeline ==
=== 2002–2008 ===
In 2002, Saudi Arabia removed their ambassador from Qatar over Al Jazeera's alleged critical stance towards Saudi Arabia. Diplomatic relations were re-established in 2008, after assurances that Al Jazeera would limit its coverage of Saudi Arabia.

=== 2014 ===
During a March 2014 meeting of the Gulf Cooperation Council, after which the United Arab Emirates, Saudi Arabia and Bahrain announced the recall of their ambassadors to Qatar, citing interference with their internal affairs. The situation was eventually defused after Qatar forced Brotherhood members to leave the country eight months later.

Some economists have interpreted the 2014 Saudi–Qatari rift as the tangible political sign of a growing economic rivalry between oil and natural gas producers, which could "have deep and long-lasting consequences" beyond the Middle East-North Africa area.

=== 2017–2018: Qatar–Saudi Arabia diplomatic crisis ===
In June 2017, Saudi Arabia, the United Arab Emirates, Bahrain, Egypt, Maldives, Mauritania, Mauritius, Sudan, Senegal, Djibouti, Comoros, Jordan, the Tobruk-based Libyan government and the Hadi-led Yemeni government severed diplomatic relations with Qatar and blocked Qatar's airspace and sea routes along with Saudi Arabia blocking the only land crossing over its relations with Iran, Al-Jazeera reporting negative information about other GCC states and Egypt and the country's alleged support of Islamist groups. Qatar was also expelled from the anti-Houthi coalition. Qatar's defense minister Khalid bin Mohammed Al Attiyah called the blockade akin to a bloodless declaration of war and Qatar's finance minister Ali Sharif Al Emadi stated that Qatar is rich enough to withstand the blockade.

The Saudi coalition withdrawing diplomatic relations accuse Qatar of supporting terrorism, of interfering with their internal affairs and of maintaining relations with Iran. Qatar denies allegations that it supported terrorism, and pointed out that it has been contributing to the U.S.-led fight against ISIL. The countries have also stressed the measures are in response to Qatar's violation of an agreement in 2014 to not undermine the "interests, security and stability" of other Gulf Cooperation Council (GCC) countries.

The diplomatic crisis came after a speech in May given by Emir Tamim bin Hamad Al Thani in which he was alleged to have declared support for Iran, Hamas, and the Muslim Brotherhood, along with calling Iran an "Islamic power" and criticizing Donald Trump's hostile stance toward it. Qatar denied the allegations and claimed that hackers had posted fabricated statements on the state-run Qatar News Agency's website. US investigators believe the news agency was breached by Russian hackers as part of an ongoing fake news campaign designed to cause diplomatic rifts among the United States and its allies in the region. The Kremlin denied involvement, and the government of Qatar claimed the hack instead originated in the boycotting Gulf states not Russia after tracking suspicious cellphone signals. Qatar is planning to sue countries involved in the blockade. The sudden economic isolation forced Qatar to turn to Turkey and Iran for food and water supplies. Iran offered to use three of its ports for delivering supplies to Qatar.

Arab media claimed that Qatar has secretly accepted to become part of an Iranian Shia sphere of influence that Tehran is trying to create in the Middle East, and which would include Lebanon (Hezbollah), Syria (Assad), and Iraq (Shia-majority government) and that, in a phone conversation with Iranian President Hassan Rouhani, Emir Al Thani said he wanted the ties with Iran to be "stronger than ever before." Qatar claims Iranian-backed Hezbollah is a resistance movement against Israeli occupation, not a terrorist group. Arab media also claimed that a member of Qatar's ruling House of Thani, Sheikh Abdullah bin Nasser bin Abdullah Al Ahmed Al Thani, tweeted that Qatar's ruler Tamim has "joined forces with Iran against your brothers and set up terrorist groups and published electronic battalions to beat your opponents." Saudi media also alleged that Iran Revolutionary Guards are protecting Qatar's ruler Tamim bin Hamad Al Thani inside his palace.

The Saudi-led bloc of states issued prerequisites to be met by Qatar before restoring diplomatic relations and lifting the blockade. The thirteen demands stipulated that the country must cut relations, military, and intelligence cooperation with Iran, comply with the US and international trade sanctions on Iran, immediately shut down a Turkish military base, and halt military cooperation with Turkey. It was also demanded that Qatar cut any existing ties with all "terrorist, sectarian and ideological organizations" such as ISIL, the Muslim Brotherhood, Hamas, Taliban, Al-Qaeda, Al-Nusra Front, and Hezbollah, and must concur with any group's addition to the list of terrorist organizations as defined by Saudi Arabia, the UAE, Bahrain, and Egypt. Other demands were more punitive, requiring reparations and compensation for loss of life and other financial losses caused by Qatar's policies in recent years, the closure of state-funded media outlets like Al Jazeera, Arabi21, Rassd, Al-Araby Al-Jadeed, Mekameleen, and the Middle East Eye.

The bloc sought a guarantee that Qatar will in the future align in all matters with other Gulf states, discuss all its decisions with them, and provide regular reports on its activity (monthly for the first year, quarterly for the second and annual for the following ten years). They also demanded deportation of all political refugees who live in Qatar to their countries of origin, freezing their assets, providing any desired information about their residency, movements and finances, revoking their Qatari citizenship if naturalized, and forbade Qatar from granting citizenship to any more fugitives.

Upon rejection of demands by Qatar, the countries involved announced that the blockade would remain in place until Qatar changes its policies.

=== 2021: Gulf Reconciliation ===
On 5 January 2021, the Emir of Qatar Sheikh Tamim bin Hamad Al Thani visited the city of Al-Ula in Saudi Arabia for the Gulf Cooperation Council (GCC) summit. Saudi, along with the United Arab Emirates, Bahrain and Egypt, signed an agreement to restore full diplomatic relations with Qatar, and to end the three and a half years of blockade. The resolution was brokered by Kuwait and the US.

Initially, only Saudi agreed to reopen its airspace and maritime borders with Qatar, commencing the process of reconciliation. However, the UAE joined in later and announced to open all of its land, sea and air borders, allowing travel and trade with Qatar.

On 16 January 2021, the Foreign Minister of Saudi Arabia Faisal bin Farhan announced that his country will be re-opening their embassy in Qatar, as part of the Al-Ula deal of reconciliation.

On 8 December 2021, Saudi Arabia's Crown Prince Mohammed bin Salman arrived in Doha on his first visit since Saudi Arabia and several other Arab allies imposed an embargo on Qatar in mid-2017. Prince Mohammed was received on arrival by emir Sheikh Tamim bin Hamed al-Thani.

== Countries of contention ==
=== Egypt ===
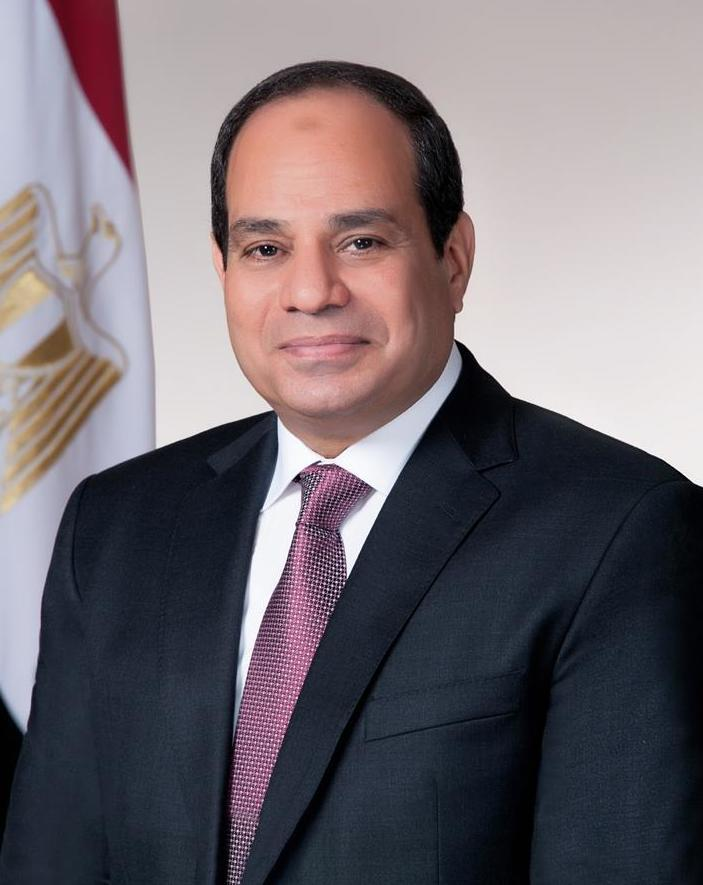
Egypt's President Abdel Fattah el-Sisi (left), who is supported by Saudi Arabia and replaced then President Mohamed Morsi (right), who was supported by Qatar.

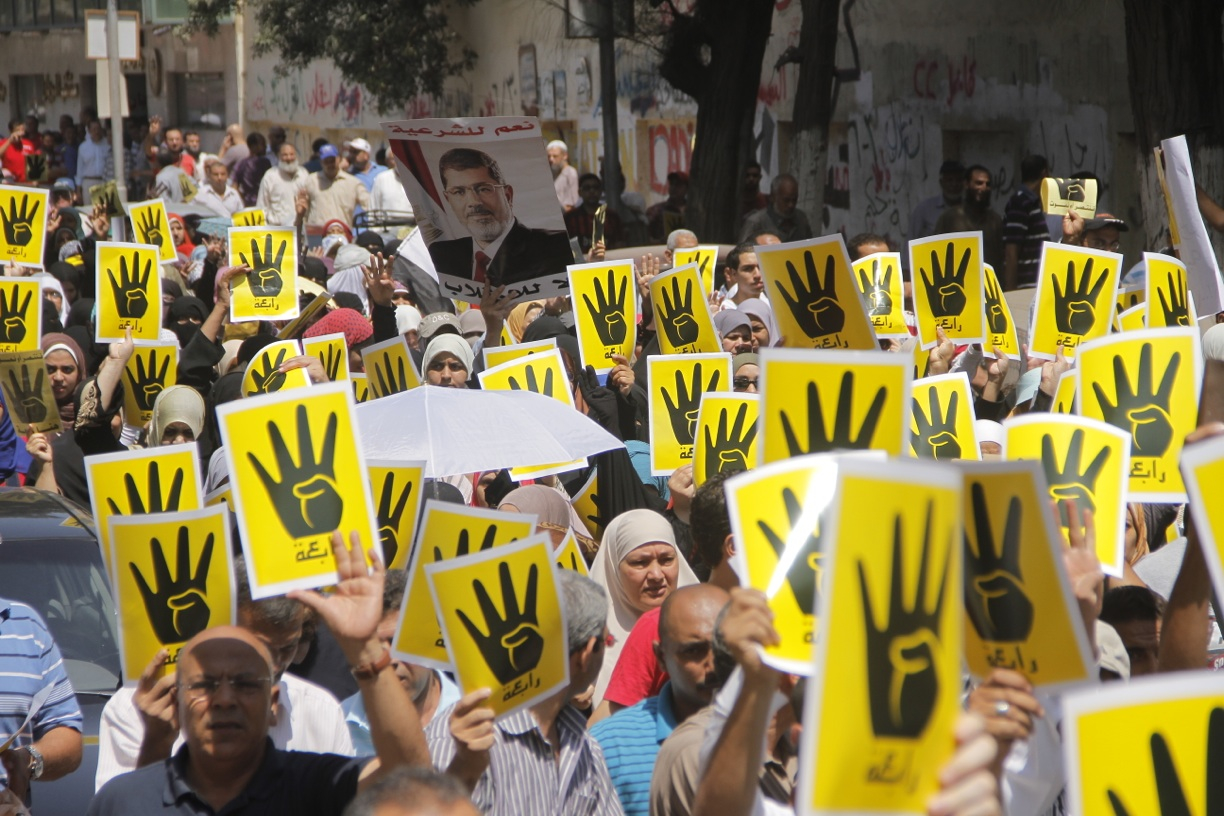
Protesters holding the Rabia sign, a sign used by the Muslim Brotherhood and its supporters in Egypt in the wake of the overthrow of Mohamed Morsi.

Qatar has supported the Muslim Brotherhood in the past.

Qatar supported the successful ouster of President Hosni Mubarak in February 2011, which was a landmark moment for Al Jazeera. Qatari-backed Muslim Brotherhood-affiliated candidate Mohamed Morsi became Egypt's first democratically elected president in 2012, only to be overthrown the next year by a Saudi-supported military coup led by Abdel Fattah el-Sisi, after widespread protests against his rule.

Since the coup, Saudi Arabia sees the Muslim Brotherhood as a threat, as it ideologically opposes the hereditary rule of Al Saud. The government of Egypt has long viewed the Muslim Brotherhood as "enemy number one". In 2011, during the Arab Spring, Qatar supported the Egyptian protesters agitating for change, as well as the Muslim Brotherhood. By contrast, Saudi Arabia supported Hosni Mubarak and currently supports Abdel Fattah el-Sisi

In February 2015, Egypt–Qatar relations deteriorated after the Egyptian Air Force conducted airstrikes on suspected ISIL positions in neighboring Libya following the beheading of 21 Egyptian Coptic Christians. The airstrikes were condemned by Al Jazeera, who broadcast images of civilian casualties. Additionally, Qatar's foreign ministry expressed reservations over the airstrikes. This prompted Tariq Adel, Egypt's Arab League delegate, to accuse Qatar of supporting terrorism. Egyptian citizens also launched an online campaign denouncing the Qatari government. The Gulf Cooperation Council rejected Egypt's accusations and its secretary general regarded the statements to be false. Shortly after, Qatar recalled its ambassador to Egypt for "consultations".

=== Syria ===
Qatar was initially the main backer of protests against President Bashar al-Assad, alongside Turkey. As the Syrian government met protests with deadly force, Qatar continued to be the main supporter of the resulting armed rebellion and eventual full-scale civil war. Saudi Arabia was initially reluctant to support the overthrow of the Assad government, despite its reliance on Iran. When Qatar and Turkey became increasingly influential in Syria, Saudi Arabia joined the conflict to overthrow Assad as he became more dependent on Iran and Russia to cling to power.

During Syrian Civil War, both Qatar and Saudi Arabia have supported many Syrian opposition rebel organisations, but also sometimes the same groups. The main Qatari-supported group was the Al Nusra Front; links were made to the group via Abu Maria al-Qahtani who actively sought Qatari support and later Turkish support to split the group from al-Qaeda as well as to fight ISIL, opposing major Saudi-backed groups Islamic Front / SIF and Jaysh al-Islam. The division benefited not only Assad, Russia, and Iran, but also what became the Islamic State in 2014. In 2015, increased Saudi-Qatari coordination upon Salman's ascension to the throne led to the creation of the Army of Conquest. This Army captured the Idlib Governorate from the Assad government, which nearly collapsed until Russian military intervention in the Syrian Civil War later that year.

Saudi Arabia later joined the UAE in supporting the Syrian Democratic Forces, which has clashed with Qatar's ally Turkey in northern Syria.

On 9 November 2018, After Qatari Prime Minister Mohammed bin Abdulrahman bin Jassim Al Thani visited Iraq and Iraqi government officials and proposed the creation of a new coalition to counter the GCC's influence in the region consisting of Iraq, Iran, Syria, and Turkey as well as Qatar.

Since November 2018, Saudi Arabia and Syria were negotiating a political reaprochement, with the United Arab Emirates, Egypt and Jordan as an intermediaries. The talks included potential future cooperation against the Muslim Brotherhood in the region. Since 2021, regular meetings between the heads of intelligence services were held. On 23 March 2023, Saudi Arabia and Syria began discussing restoration of diplomatic relations. On 13 April 2023, Syrian Foreign Minister Faisal Mekdad arrived in Jeddah to meet Saudi Foreign Minister Faisal bin Farhan Al Saud. After frayed relations during the Syrian civil war, both nations now seek "a political solution to the Syrian crisis that preserves the unity, security and stability of Syria,” according to the Saudi foreign ministry. As of 2023, Qatar supports the Hayat Tahrir al-Sham and other Islamist groups, while Saudi Arabia supports the Syrian government.

=== Libya ===
Leader Muammar Gaddafi was killed following 2011 revolution that saw a Qatari and other military intervention on the side of the revolutionary National Transitional Council. Since the civil war escalated in 2014, the Saudi bloc and Qatar have supported rival factions in Libya. Qatar supports the Internationally recognized government of Government of National Accord, while Saudi Arabia supports the Tobruk-based government of House of Representatives.

=== Palestine ===
Qatar has generally supported Hamas, while Saudi Arabia used to support many Palestinian political organizations, including Hamas and the Palestine Liberation Organization (PLO)/Fatah. However, after Hamas won the 2006 Palestinian legislative election, the level of funding from Saudi Arabia dropped, while the level of funding from Iran increased. Turkey and Qatar are now Hamas's biggest supporters. Up until 2011, the beginning of the Arab Spring, Iran and Syria were Hamas's biggest supporters.

From 2016 onwards, Palestinian President Mahmoud Abbas has courted Qatar and Turkey in order to ward off a potential challenge to his leadership by Mohammed Dahlan, who is supported by Saudi Arabia, the UAE and Egypt.

=== Yemen ===
In 2015, Salman of Saudi Arabia ascends to the throne and Houthis take over the capital, leading to a civil war met by Saudi intervention to support the post-Saleh national unity government led by Abdrabbuh Mansur Hadi. Qatar supported this KSA-led coalition until it was expelled from it during the 2017–18 Qatar diplomatic crisis. Pro-Saudi sources claim that Qatar was also supporting the Houthis government, with financial aid and intelligence aid.

In 2007, Qatar assumed a mediating position with the aim of facilitating dialogue and potentially orchestrating a peace agreement between the government of Yemen and the Houthi insurgents, a group adhering to Zaidi Shia Islam and based in the Saada Governorate in the north. This intervention by Qatar was notable for being among the earliest significant external endeavors to mediate the ongoing conflict.

== Other involved parties ==
=== Turkey ===
Turkey has emerged as a major supporter for Qatar in the conflict. The Turkish government under Recep Tayyip Erdoğan had deployed troops to assist Qatar deterring Saudi Arabia, as well as food aid. There has been skepticism about the relations between two countries, in particular.

=== Jordan ===
While Jordan has some sporadic tensions with Qatar with regard to Al Jazeera, Jordan refused to cut ties completely with Qatar, as the country is dependent on aid from the Gulf nations to function the economy. Public pressure inside also forced Jordan to decide its decision carefully. In 2019, Jordan restored relations with Qatar. Both Qatar and Saudi Arabia are major financiers for Jordan, and the Jordanian authorities have long been afraid such tensions could provide more opportunities for Iran to destabilize the region.

=== Egypt ===
Egypt supports Saudi Arabia and has cut off official ties with Qatar since 2017, in light of Qatar's accused support for Muslim Brotherhood, and has remained unchanged over the issues.

=== Iran ===
Iran has been one of the major supporters for Qatar, though its support is limited. Iran has unofficially supported some of Qatar's policies while Qatar restored ties with Iran.

=== Kuwait ===
Kuwait, a similar Gulf country with Qatar and Saudi Arabia, maintained diplomatic relations with both countries and offered to be a mediator in the conflict. However, there has been skepticism over Kuwait's role on mediating the disputes, mainly due to Saudi pressure to cut ties with Qatar.

== See also ==
- Egyptian Crisis (2011–2014)
- Iran–Saudi Arabia relations
- Iran–Saudi Arabia proxy conflict
- Iran–Israel proxy conflict
- The New Great Game
- Qatar diplomatic crisis
- Qatar–Saudi Arabia border
- Qatar–Saudi Arabia relations
- 2017 Lebanon–Saudi Arabia dispute
- International Maritime Security Construct
- Russia–Syria–Iran–Iraq coalition
- Shia–Sunni relations
- Middle Eastern Cold War (disambiguation)
- Arab Cold War
- Axis of Resistance
