= Qatar–Saudi Arabia relations =

- Qatar: Saudi Arabia

Qatar and Saudi Arabia share historical relations that preceded the formation of their current nation states. Prior to 1995, Qatar followed Saudi Arabia's political clout and both countries were highly aligned politically. In 1995, after Sheikh Hamad bin Khalifa Al Thani became Emir of Qatar, he sought to establish Qatar's own influence in regional affairs and on the world's stage. In 1996, Qatar launched Al Jazeera to enhance the country's soft power. Al Jazeera routinely criticized Saudi Arabia, which often led to worsening of diplomatic ties between the two countries. Al Jazeera also provided a platform for Islamist groups, some of which were considered a threat to Saudi Arabia. The strained relations and divergence in geopolitics and regional influence led to the Qatar–Saudi Arabia diplomatic conflict.

Qatar participated in the Saudi-led intervention in Yemen, sending approximately 1,000 soldiers. On 5 June 2017, Saudi Arabia along with Bahrain, Egypt and the United Arab Emirates severed all ties with Qatar. The four countries accused Qatar of supporting terrorist groups and destabilizing the region, an accusation denied by Qatar. As part of this campaign, the Saudi-led quartet closed off their airspaces, territorial waters and land borders to Qatar. Saudi Arabia also suspended Qatar's involvement in the Saudi led intervention in Yemen.

On 4 January 2021, Qatar and Saudi Arabia agreed to reopen airspace, land, and maritime borders. On 16 January, the Saudi announced it would reopen its embassy in Qatar. On 9 January 2021, Saudi Customs resumed operations with Qatar at the Salwa border crossing, and on 14 February 2021, the trade of goods between Qatar and Saudi Arabia resumed through the Abu Samra border crossing.

== Diplomatic relations prior to the 20th century ==
It was not until an 1868 maritime agreement that Qatar was recognized as a sovereign entity by the British, who controlled much of the Persian Gulf. The mid-1800s saw the emergence of a centralized seat of power under the House of Al Thani. However, until the signing of the 1868 agreement, ownership of Qatar switched hands often between the House of Al Thani, the Saudis and the House of Al Khalifa.

Some time before 1810, the transitory ruler of Qatar Rahmah ibn Jabir Al Jalhami allied himself with the Saudis, offering them partial dominion over Qatar, including the right to collect taxes from Qataris and the adoption of Salafism as the dominant form of Islam in Qatar. The Al Khalifa of Bahrain along with the Sultan of Muscat razed Saudi fortifications in Qatar and Bahrain in 1811, effectually shifting the suzerainty of Qatar from the Saudis to the Al Khalifa. At this time the Saudis were embroiled in a drawn-out war with the Ottoman Empire in the west, so they did not dedicate many troops towards Qatar's defense nor did they contest the Al Khalifa immediately afterward. Nonetheless, over the proceeding years, certain Qatari tribes would pledge allegiance to the Saudis, preferring their rule over the Al Khalifa. This prompted the Al Khalifa to install its own government officials on the Qatari Peninsula in the 1830s to scout for any collaboration between the Qataris and Saudis.

== Political cooperation ==
=== Foreign policy ===
Until the late 20th century when Emir Hamad bin Khalifa Al Thani assumed the throne, Qatar toed the Saudi line in its foreign policy. Both countries were staunch critics of Ayatollah Khomeini's Iran regime and Israel. Saudi Arabia and Qatar were two of the six co-founders of the Gulf Cooperation Council in 1981.

Even after bilateral relations worsened in the 1990s and 2000s, Qatar still followed the Kingdom's lead in several issues, such as participating in the Saudi-led intervention in Bahrain in 2011, participating in the Saudi Arabian-led intervention in Yemen in 2015, and recalling its ambassador to Tehran over the 2016 attack on the Saudi diplomatic missions in Iran. Nonetheless, after the Qatar diplomatic crisis erupted in June 2017, there has been no political cooperation of any sort between the two, with Qatar going as far as to defiantly reinstate its ambassador to Iran in August 2017.

=== Saudi mediation of Bahrain–Qatar disputes ===
Saudi Arabia has a decades-long history of mediating disputes between Qatar and its neighbor Bahrain. Relations between the two countries have historically been turbulent due to disagreements over the rightful ownership of several territories. In the 1940s, the Saudis were responsible for mediating a dispute between the two over Zubarah's ownership, being preferred over the British. Saudi Arabia also helped the two reach an agreement over the Hawar Islands. However, the Saudis efforts did not result in any tangible results, and Qatari-Bahraini territorial disputes were referred to the International Court of Justice in 1991.

=== Saudi mediation of internal conflicts in Qatar ===
Saudi Arabia had served as a safe haven for dissidents of Qatar from the mid-20th century onward, ranging from high-ranking members of the Al Thani family to businessmen and common people. Qatar itself had often exiled its most powerful critics to Saudi Arabia. This was usually temporary, with the dissidents returning to Qatar after the Saudi government would negotiate resolutions between the two parties.

== Political disputes ==
=== Ascension of Hamad bin Khalifa Al Thani ===
Since he took power in 1995, Hamad bin Khalifa Al Thani believed Qatar could find security only by transforming itself from a de facto Saudi vassal state to a rival of Saudi Arabia. When Hamad bin Khalifa assumed power, Qatar was in a better position to chart its own path than any time prior because of the massive wealth it had gained from hydrocarbon extraction. Among his early actions that drew the ire of the Saudis were forming ties with Iran and Israel and establishing Al Jazeera in 1996.

In 1996, a counter coup d'état attempt of Hamad bin Khalifa was foiled. Qatari intelligence indicated that the masterminds behind the attempt were government officials from Saudi Arabia, Bahrain, Egypt and the United Arab Emirates.

=== Early-to-late 2000s ===
After Saudi Arabia refused to host US troops preparing for the Iraq War, in early 2002 the US signed a military agreement with Qatar culminating in the opening of Al Udeid Air Base. This was an important phase in Qatar's pivot from Saudi influence, since the US base guaranteed Qatar's protection against any possible military interventions by Saudi Arabia and its allies.

In July 2002, a broadcast by Al Jazeera featured Saudi religious activist Mohsen Al-Awaji, who criticized Saudi Arabia's involvement in Afghanistan and its approach on the Palestinian question. For this reason, Saudi Arabia withdrew its ambassador to Doha from 2002 to 2008 to try to pressure Qatar to curb its individualistic tendencies. This approach broadly failed.

=== 2014 Saudi–Qatari rift ===
During a March 2014 meeting of the Gulf Cooperation Council (GCC), after which the United Arab Emirates, Saudi Arabia and Bahrain announced the recall of their ambassadors to Qatar. This was largely a result of Qatar's backing of Islamist groups, namely the Muslim Brotherhood.

Some economists have interpreted the 2014 Saudi–Qatari rift as the tangible political sign of a growing economic rivalry between oil and natural gas producers, which could "have deep and long-lasting consequences" beyond the Middle East-North Africa area.

=== 2017–19 Qatar diplomatic crisis ===
On 5 June 2017, Saudi Arabia had officially cut ties with Qatar. Saudi Arabia said it took the decision to cut diplomatic ties due to Qatar's "embrace of various terrorist and sectarian groups aimed at destabilising the region", including the Muslim Brotherhood, al-Qaida, Islamic State of Iraq and the Levant, and groups supported by Iran in the kingdom's Eastern Province city of Qatif. Islam Hassan argues that: "Starting the 2000 and ahead, Qatar has been pursuing an independent foreign policy that at times clash with the Saudi strategic interests in the region. The fact that Qatar has not been toeing the Saudi foreign policy, and dealing with states and non-state actors that the Saudis do not approve of have caused this tension in relations over the past couple of years, mainly after the Arab uprisings. This tension was revived by the hacking saga of Qatar News Agency and the statement that was attributed to Sheikh Tamim bin Hamad, which Qatar falsified later.

Other experts have argued that, given the strategic and economic imbalance of the relationship, Doha could eventually pay "an incommensurate price for having thought it could defy forever the laws of geo-economic gravity […] Qatar has had to resort to expensive imports from Iran and Oman to circumvent the Saudi-led blockade: such an impractical expediency won’t be tenable in the long term, as Iran itself is subject to various commercial sanctions and Qatar doesn’t possess the modern naval infrastructure that may have allowed it to truly withstand the shock".

Saudi Arabia threatened Doha with military action over its negotiations with Russia in purchasing a Russian-made air defense system.

Sheikh Mohammed bin Abdulrahman bin Jassim Al Thani, Foreign Minister of Qatar, said in an interview that this threat is an example of "impulsive behaviour" and is detrimental to GCC stability.

After initially boycotting the 2019 Arabian Gulf Cup in Qatar, Saudi Arabia, later in November 2019, announced to participate in the tournament, signaling a thaw to the stand-off between the countries.

In July 2020, in Al Arabiya English a report was published presenting a leaked audio recording of Qatar’s former Emir Sheikh Hamad bin Khalifa al‑Thani and former Prime Minister Sheikh Hamad bin Jassim Al Thani in conversation with the late Libyan leader Muammar Gaddafi. In the conversation they express support in Iran backed Houthi militia and its claim for territories in Saudi Arabia. bin Jassim criticizes Saudi Arabia’s relations with its neighbors, while Gaddafi supports dividing Saudi regions into separate countries for the sake of “balance power,”. Sheikh Hamad suggests the Houthis believe that parts of Saudi Arabia like the Hejaz, are “their country.”

== Economic relations ==
Until the Qatar diplomatic crisis, Qatar imported upwards of 80% of its food from its Persian Gulf neighbors, chiefly Saudi Arabia. The vast majority of food was transported on land through the Salwa Border Crossing connecting both countries. This border crossing was closed in June 2017 and Qatar's trade with the blockading countries was suspended, thereby cutting off Qatar from its primary source of food imports. Imports of pharmaceuticals were also interrupted in Qatar, of which 50 to 60% was supplied by Saudi Arabia and the other Arab countries in the Persian Gulf.

Qatar bypassed the blockade by setting up trade routes with Turkey, Iran, Kuwait and Oman. In May 2018, Qatar declared that it would ban products imported from Saudi Arabia and the three other blockading nations.

Saudi Arabia is the top source of tourists for Qatar, constituting almost one-third of all tourist arrivals in 2024.

In December 2025, the Qatari government signed a memorandum of understanding with the Saudi government to establish a high speed rail link between the two countries. The project had an estimated completion date of 2031.

== Military relations ==
During the Bahraini uprising of 2011, Qatar participated in the Saudi-led intervention in Bahrain, offering troops to the Peninsula Shield Force to quell the mainly Shiite protestors.

Qatar provided 1,000 ground troops for the Saudi Arabian-led intervention in Yemen in 2015. At the onset of the Qatar diplomatic crisis in June 2017, Saudi Arabia suspended Qatar's involvement in the Yemen campaign. Saudi Arabia allowed a Qatari contingent to participate in the Joint Gulf Shield 1 Drill held in April 2018 in the Saudi town of Ras Al-Khair.

Although Qatar was traditionally reliant on Saudi Arabia for its security, the Turkish military base in Qatar, set up in 2014, allowed Qatar to reduce its dependency on Saudi Arabia.

== Media rivalry ==
Qatari media organisation Al Jazeera was launched in 1996 and within a short time it became one of the most influential news sources for the Arab world. Al Jazeera was regarded as controversial by many Middle Eastern governments, all of whom kept a tight rein on the information consumed by their population. Among other events, the network has granted interviews to Israeli government officials, interviewed with Islamist and terrorist groups, and criticized the rulers of Arab countries. Saudi Arabia regards Al Jazeera as a propaganda tool of the Qatari government used to undermine the region's stability.

Mainly due to Al Jazeera's publishing of a peace treaty made between the Saudi and Israeli governments, in 2002 Saudi Arabia withdrew its ambassador from Qatar in protest. He was not reinstated until 2008. In 2003, Saudi Arabia inaugurated Al Arabiya, which tried to become the counterweight to Al Jazeera. Al Arabiya has been among Al Jazeera's most vocal critics. Amidst the 2014 Qatar–GCC rift, Saudi Arabia halted Al Jazeera's operations in the country over the network's broadcasting of incendiary statements made in interviews and directed at the Persian Gulf monarchies, and its readiness to provide Islamist groups with a podium.

At the beginning of the Qatar diplomatic crisis in June 2017, Al Jazeera broadcasting was banned in Saudi Arabia. Furthermore, its office was shut down and websites were blocked. When the Saudi-led quartet presented their list of demands to Qatar over two weeks later, one of the demands stipulated that Qatar's government close down of Al Jazeera and other Qatar-affiliated media organisations.

Saudi Arabia banned Qatari-based beIN Sports on 13 June 2017, shortly after the diplomatic crisis began. beIN Sports is one of the largest sport broadcasters in Asia and holds exclusive licenses with many European leagues for the MENA region. No clear explanation was given for Saudi Arabia's decision to ban the network except that its government made the decision out of "concern for the rights of its citizens and residents". Months later, a pirated network broadcasting beIN Sports' programmes emerged in Saudi Arabia called "beoutQ". Qatar accused the Saudi government of being behind the scheme and claimed that beoutQ was formed as a way of subverting Qatar's soft power and global influence.

== Resident diplomatic missions ==
- Qatar has an embassy in Riyadh.
- Saudi Arabia has an embassy in Doha.

== See also ==
- Foreign relations of Qatar
- Foreign relations of Saudi Arabia
