= Eglat Faisal =

Eglat Faisal عقلة فيصل
- District
- Location within Qatar
- Coordinates: 24.884072°N 50.877918°E
- Country: Qatar
- Municipality: Al Rayyan
- Zone no.: Zone 96
- District no.: 705

Area
  - Total: 17.8 km^{2} (6.9 sq mi)
- Elevation: 12 m (39 ft)

Eglat Faisal (Arabic: عقلة فيصل) is a district in south-west Qatar, located in the municipality of Al Rayyan.

Nearby settlements include Abu Samra to the south and Umm Al Jaratheem to the north-east.

== Etymology ==
Eglat originates from the Arabic oqlat, meaning "shallow well". The second element, Faisal, is the name of the man who built the well. Owing to the well's significance, its name was extended to the surrounding area, which also encompassed a farm.
