= Qatar–Saudi Arabia border =

International border

Map of Qatar, with Saudi Arabia to the south

The Qatar–Saudi Arabia border is 87 km (54 mi) in length and runs from the Gulf of Bahrain coast in the west to the Persian Gulf coast in the east.

== Description ==
The border begins in the west at the Gulf of Salwah, proceeding overland via 4–5 straight lines (maps differ on the precise depiction) which forms a broad arc, terminating in the east at the Khor Al Adaid coast.

=== Qatar–United Arab Emirates border ===
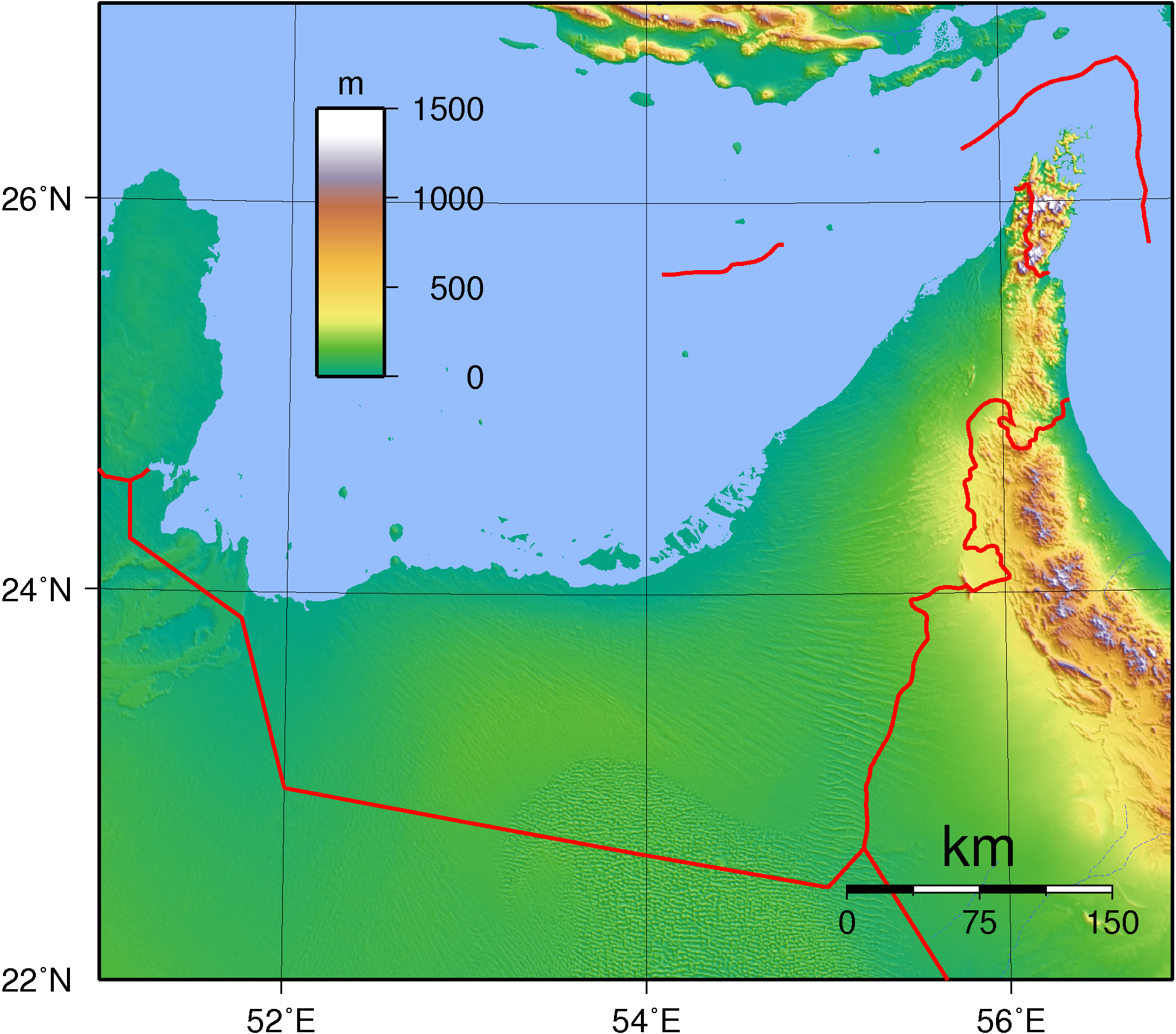
Map of the United Arab Emirates showing the pre-1974 boundary with the UAE bordering Qatar.

Prior to the signing of the 1974 Treaty of Jeddah between Saudi Arabia and the UAE there was some confusion as to whether Qatar shared a border with the UAE, with maps commonly depicting a long Emirati panhandle touching Qatar. This treaty gave Saudi Arabia access to the Khor Al Adaid, thereby removing any possibility of Qatar sharing a land border with the UAE.

== History ==
Historically there was no clearly defined boundary in this part of the Arabian Peninsula.

From 1868 Britain exercised control over Qatar as a de facto protectorate, formalized as such in 1916. The interior of Arabia consisted of loosely organized Arab groupings, occasionally forming emirates, most prominent of which was the Emirate of Nejd and Hasa ruled by the al-Saud family. Britain and the Ottoman Empire theoretically divided their realms of influence via the so-called 'Blue' and 'Violet lines' in 1913–14.

During the First World War an Arab revolt, supported by Britain, succeeded in removing the Ottomans from much of the Middle East; in the period following this, Ibn Saud expanded his kingdom considerably, eventually proclaiming the Kingdom of Saudi Arabia in 1932. Ibn Saud refused to recognize the Anglo-Ottoman lines and lay claim to large parts of the eastern Arabian hinterland (the so-called ‘Hamza line’).

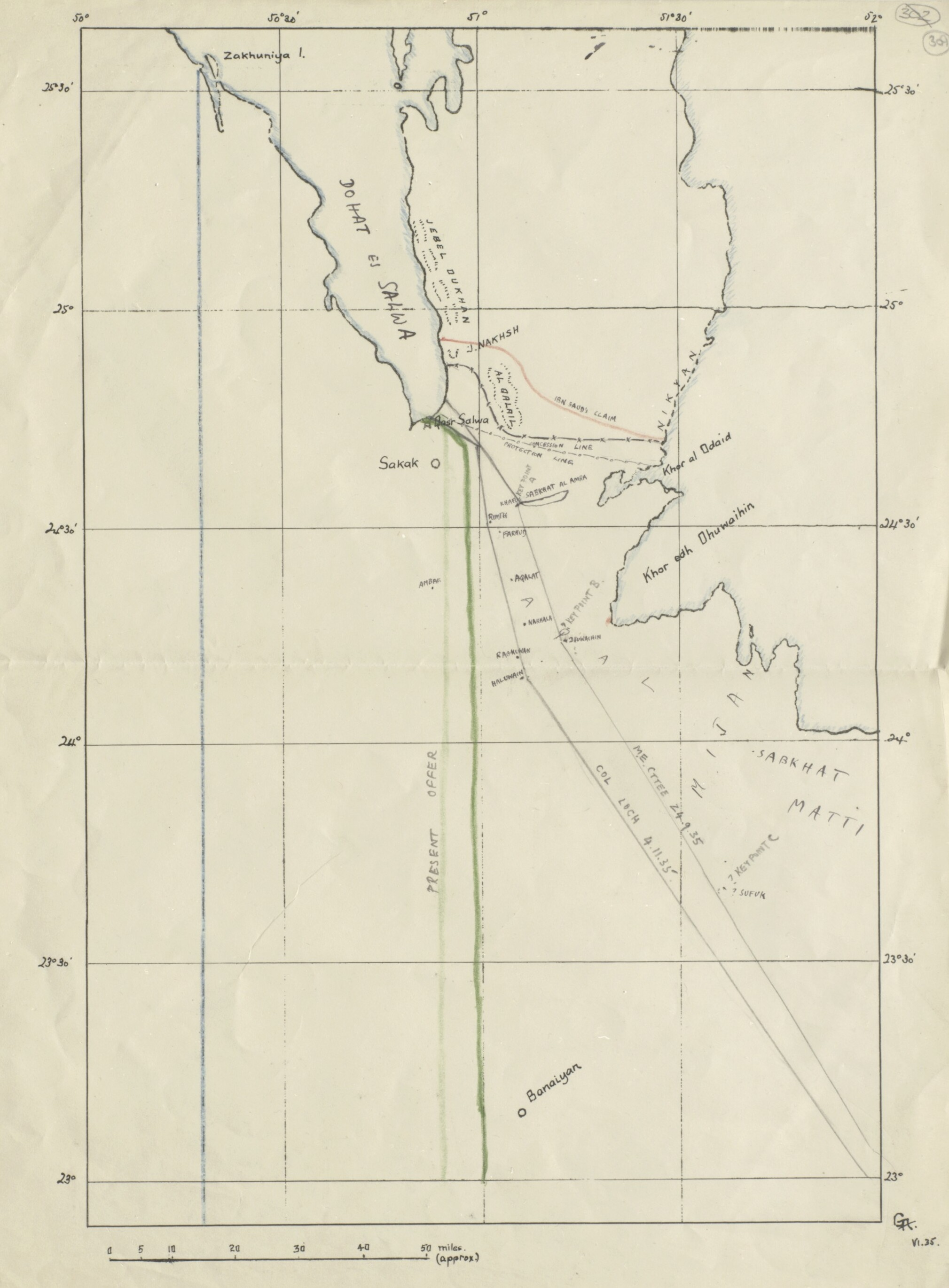
Sketch map illustrating Qatari Saudi border dispute drawn in 1935.

On 25 November 1935 British officials met with Ibn Saud in an attempt to finalize a frontier between the new kingdom and their coastal protectorates, including Qatar. The conference proved abortive, however, and the issue remained unresolved. According to a British document written in 1936, the prime cause of friction in the territorial dispute revolved around where Qatar's south-west borders should end. The rulers of both Qatar and Saudi Arabia claimed that their control of the Dohat Salwa area had historical precedent, however, Ibn Saud claimed that the Sheikh of Qatar had previously ceded this territory to him, to which the Sheikh denied. The letter stated:

Consideration was given to the question of what Sir Andrew Ryan should say in reply to a suggestion by Fuad that there was an agreement between the Sheikh of Qatar and Ibn Jiluwi (possibly before 1916), whereby the sheikh formally accepted Ibn Saud's sovereignty over Jebel Naksh. The existence of any such agreement is categorically denied by the Sheikh, and the meeting agreed that as a first step Sir Andrew Ryan should at some convenient opportunity ask the Saudi Government for further information about this alleged agreement; saying that H.M.G. have been unable to trace anything of the kind and that in seeking for further information they do not necessarily admit that if the existence of an agreement were established they could recognise it as a valid instrument.

The conference proved abortive, however, and the issue remained unresolved. In 1955, following an attempt by Saudi Arabia to assert its control over the Buraimi Oasis on the Oman–Trucial States border, Britain stated that it would unilaterally use a slightly modified version of the 1935 'Riyadh line' henceforth.

A border treaty between Qatar and Saudi Arabia was made in 1965, though the precise terms of its implementation was a long-standing point of contention between the two. In September 1992, tensions arose when Saudi forces allegedly attacked a Qatari border post, resulting in the death of two Qatari soldiers and the imprisonment of a third. According to Saudi Arabia, the attack was precipitated by Qatar moving its border post of Al-Khufus about 14 kilometres (8.7 mi) south from its previous location during the Gulf War.

A border agreement was reached between the two parties in 1999, and the final treaty was signed in 2001.

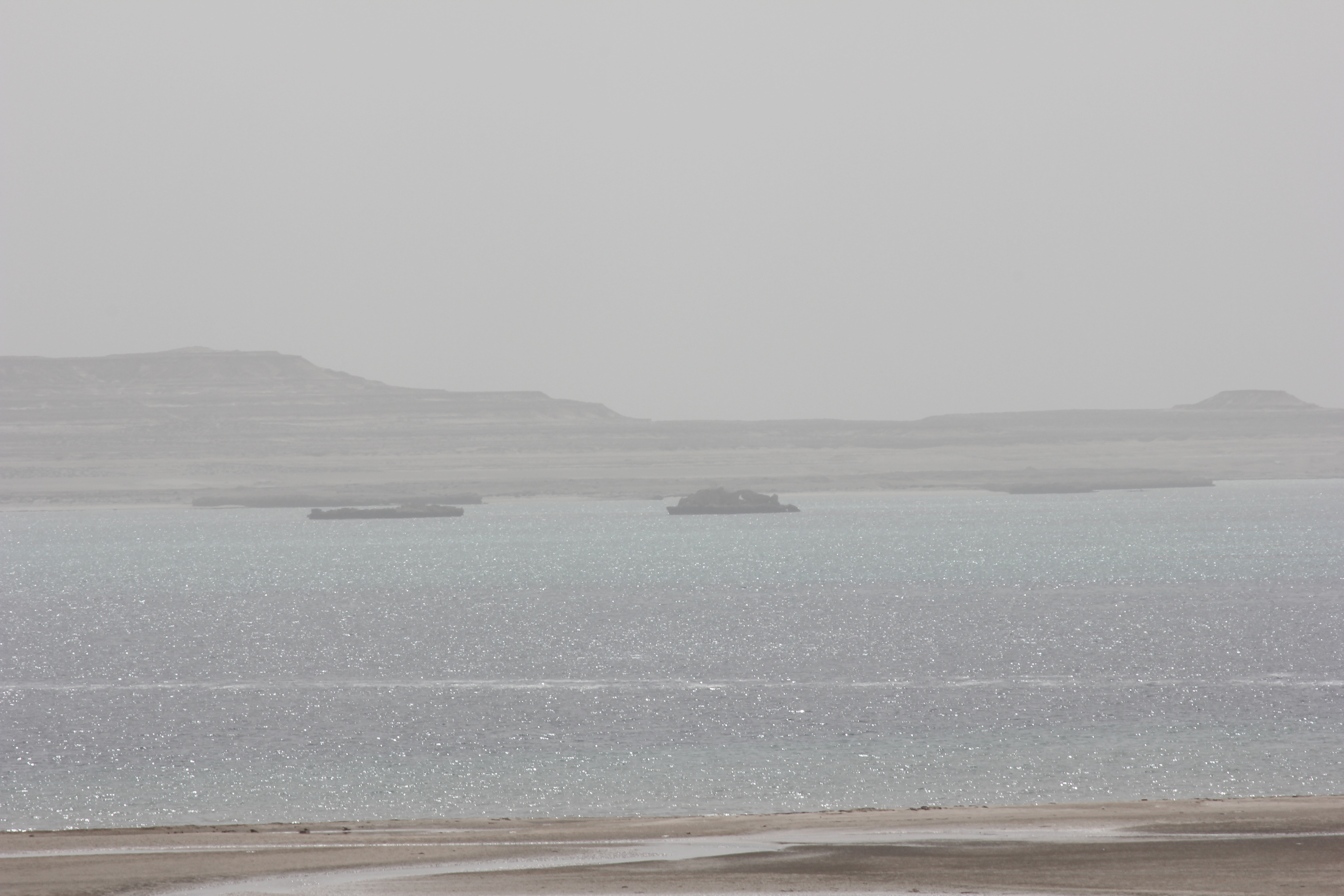
Gulf of Salwah separating Qatar and Saudi Arabia

Following a severe deterioration in Saudi–Qatar relations in 2017 the border was shut. In June 2018 Saudi Arabia announced that it is planning on constructing the 61 km (38 mi) long Salwa Canal running along the Saudi side of the Salwa Border Crossing at a cost of $745 million. The canal is set to physically separate Qatar from its only land border and effectually render it an island. Media outlets in Saudi Arabia hinted at the possibility of the Saudi government dedicating portions of the canal towards a military installation and a dump site for nuclear waste.

The border was reopened on 4 January 2021. A demarcation process concluded in November 2021, which saw the southern coast of the Khor Al Adaid confirmed as lying within Qatar's borders.

== Border Crossings ==
- Abu Samra, Qatar
- Salwa, Saudi Arabia

== See also ==
- Qatar–Saudi Arabia relations
