= Iran–Qatar relations =

- Qatar: Iran

Diplomatic mission
- Qatari embassy, Tehran: Iranian embassy, Doha

Iran–Qatar relations refer to the bilateral relations between the Islamic Republic of Iran and the State of Qatar. Iran has an embassy in Doha while Qatar has an embassy in Tehran.

Both are members of the Non-Aligned Movement and the Organisation of the Islamic Conference. Unlike fellow GCC member states Saudi Arabia and the United Arab Emirates, Qatar generally refrains from criticising Iran's domestic and foreign activities. Qatar has held several high-level meetings with Iranian officials to discuss security and economic agreements.

The two countries historically had a close economic relationship which affects their diplomatic relations, particularly in the oil and gas industries. Iran and Qatar jointly control the world's largest natural gas field along their maritime border. As of early 2026, before the beginning of the US-Iran war, Qatar has produced approximately 18.5 billion cubic feet per day from the field, accounting for around 80% of Qatari government revenues, while daily production on the Iranian side was estimated to be around only 2 billion cubic feet. In addition to ties in the oil and natural gas arena, Iran and Qatar also cooperate in the shipping sector.

Relations between the two nations underwent rapid deterioration in early 2026, shifting from a period of pragmatic energy cooperation to active military hostility. This collapse was precipitated by a series of Iranian military strikes on Qatari territory following the commencement of the 2026 Iran war. Iranian state media later announced the renewal of maritime trade between Iran and Qatar after a nearly five-month pause.

== History ==
=== Prior to and during the Iranian Revolution ===
In 1969, during Shah Mohammad Reza Pahlavi's rule, Iran and Qatar signed a demarcation agreement.

During the 1970s, Qatar often followed the lead of Saudi Arabia, who had an outsized role in OPEC, regarding fossil fuel extraction. Concurrently, Qatar attempted to align its oil extraction policies with Iran as much as possible in an attempt to hedge its bets.

Leading up to the Iranian Revolution in 1979, Qatar and Iran shared a friendly relationship. This was exemplified by the support of the government of Qatar and Emir Khalifa bin Hamad Al Thani for the monarchy of Iran, stating that "Iran is a dear and friendly neighbor" during his annual speech in front of the Consultative Assembly of Qatar in 1978. At the time, Qatar viewed Iran as a counter-weight to the regional dominance of nearby countries such as Saudi Arabia, Iraq, and Syria. Furthermore, Qatar pursued cordial relations to reduce the possibility of tensions surrounding their jointly-owned natural gas field, and due to Iran's immense influence on OPEC.

Although there was some apprehension by Qatari leadership about the introduction of regional instability after the rise of the Islamic Republic, a delegation of 70 Qatari Shiites met with Ayatollah Khomeini to express their support for the revolution in March 1979.

=== 1980s: Iraqi Invasion of Iran ===
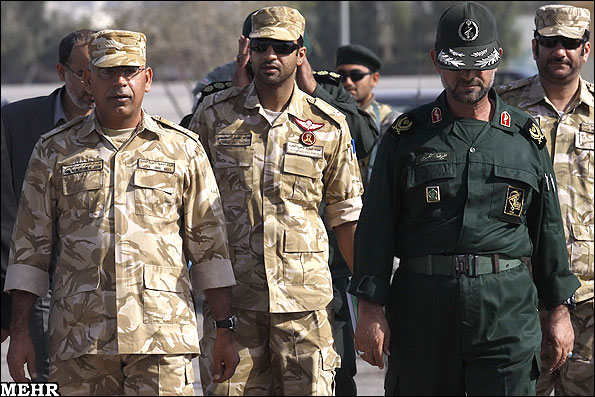
Qatari military observers at Iran's Great Prophet V military exercises in 2010

At the onset of the Iran–Iraq War in 1980, Qatar, along with Oman, opted for minimal support to Iraq, whereas Saudi Arabia and Kuwait openly provided financial support to Iraq. Qatar strategically attempted to avoid upsetting either party in the interests of not being drawn into a military conflict. The government of Qatar was also aware that it would risk marginalizing its minority Shia population if it threw its full weight behind Iraq. They were put in uncomfortable situations; in 1983 Iraq attacked Iranian oil fields in the Persian Gulf, threatening plants on the Qatari coast, forcing Qatar to build barriers so it would not be affected.

As the war ended, Iran sided with Qatar during the dispute with Bahrain over the Fasht a-Dibal Islands. However, Qatar did not support Iran when it came to the three islands of Lesser and Greater Tunbs and Abu Musa, instead supporting the United Arab Emirates. Qatar believed that its relationship with the GCC was strategically more important than its relationship with Iran.

=== 1990s ===
Qatar and Iran have maintained cordial relations. In 1991, following the end of the Gulf War, the emir of Qatar Hamad bin Khalifa welcomed Iranian participation in Persian Gulf security arrangements, but was overturned by other Gulf States. Iran did not consider Qatar a threat to its stability, unlike other Gulf states, in part because its Iranian-descent citizens were well integrated and not politically oppositional to Iranian leadership. Plans were in progress in 1992 to pipe water from the Karun River in Iran to Qatar.

=== December 2008: Concerns over Iran's nuclear program ===
The five permanent members of the UN security council (and Germany) held a meeting in 2008 with a coalition of Arab nations consisting of Saudi Arabia, the United Arab Emirates, Kuwait, Bahrain, Qatar, Jordan, Iraq, and Egypt over the perceived threat of Iran's nuclear weapons to the whole MENA region.

In response to the nuclear threat, it was forecasted that the GCC, including Qatar, would spend $122 billion on weapons over the next decade.

=== May 2009: South Pars Gas field ===
Iran and Qatar both own the South Pars / North Dome Gas-Condensate field. Iran agreed that they would issue $100 million in bonds to build and improve the gas field. On 11 January 2009, representatives from Qatar, Iran, and Russia met in Tehran, agreeing on the production of their gas reserves.

=== 2010 ===
==== Pacts, meetings and joint military training ====
In 2010, Qatar and Iran signed a defense cooperation agreement, and an internal security pact.

Meetings were held between the then-emir of Qatar, Hamad bin Khalifa Al Thani, and both the President of Iran, Mahmoud Ahmadinejad, and its supreme leader, Ali Khamenei, exchanging pledges of cooperation and friendship.

An officer in Iran's Islamic Revolutionary Guards Corps (IRGC) met with the commander of the Qatari army, stating that "IRGC and Qatar's navy can have close cooperation in intelligence, security and training fields". Hamad bin Ali Al Attiyah, Qatar's Minister of Defense, met with the naval forces of Iran and stated that Qatar is ready to have joint military exercises with Iran.

==== Qatari concerns of Iranian nuclear program and support for diplomatic resolution ====
In February 2010, at the US-Islamic World Forum in Doha, Qatari Prime Minister Hamad bin Jassim bin Jaber Al Thani conceded that if Iran's nuclear program spurs "a nuclear race in the region, it will be an unhealthy race for all". Hamad bin Jassim also advocated for "direct dialogue between Iran and the United States".

In May 2010, Emir of Qatar Hamad bin Khalifa Al Thani expressed support for Turkish-led efforts to bring about a diplomatic resolution to the dispute over Iran's nuclear program. Turkish officials proposed to mediate direct talks between Iran's top nuclear negotiator Saeed Jalili and EU foreign policy chief Catherine Ashton.

=== 2011: Bahrain's Shia uprising ===
Qatar was one of the few GCC countries that refrained from criticizing Iran's alleged interference during the 2011 Bahraini uprising, which was predominantly precipitated by Shiite Bahrainis. Nonetheless, it was widely politically perceived that Qatar supported the continuation of the Sunni Al Khalifa regime, contrasting with its generally anti-monarchist stance during the Arab Spring. Iran has denied backing Shiite activists in Bahrain. Some analysts state that, while some Shiite militant groups in Bahrain have been encouraged or nominally supported by Iran, the allegation of Iranian interference has been used to discredit all legitimate opposition.

=== 2012: Qatari emir pays ransom for IRGC fighters captured in Syria ===
In May 2021, former president Mahmoud Ahmadinejad revealed that former Emir of Qatar, Hamad bin Khalifa Al Thani, paid $57 million in ransom to free 57 IRGC fighters captured by an armed opposition group in southern Damascus in late 2012. He added that the emir refused to accept reimbursement from the Iranian government, stating that he paid the ransom "for the sake of the friendship between the two peoples".

=== 2014: Qatar offers Iran help with extracting gas ===
Amid signs that Western sanctions on Iran might soon ease, Iran requested help from Qatar on developing its side of the field, and Qatar responded positively. There were concerns expressed by Qatari officials that excessive Iranian drilling would reduce revenues on the Qatari side of the field, and some analysts have framed Qatar's offer as an attempt to limit the damage that increased activity on the Iranian side would inflict to its own interests. While Qatar's offer to help with technological advice was seen mostly as a publicity step, since the technology it uses is owned by foreign companies, it could have provided Iran with geological information on areas close to the border.

=== 2016 attack on the Saudi diplomatic missions in Iran ===
In January 2016, Iranian protestors sacked the Saudi embassy in Tehran and its foreign consulate in Mashhad. Qatar condemned the attack and decided to recall its ambassador from Tehran, while the Qatari Foreign Affairs Ministry issued a protest statement to the Iranian embassy in Doha, claiming that the attack constitutes a violation of the international charters and norms that emphasize the protection of diplomatic missions and their staff. It was the last country to back Saudi Arabia by recalling its ambassador.

=== 2017 Iranian support during Qatar diplomatic crisis ===
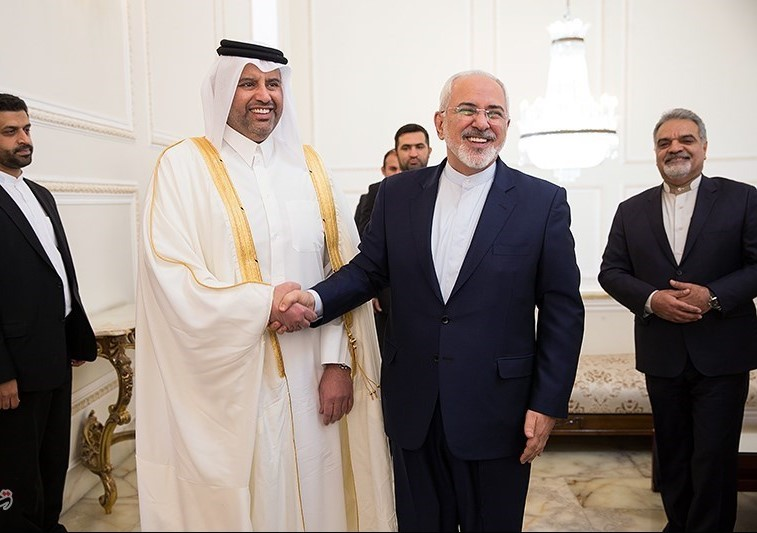
Qatari Minister Ahmed bin Jassim Al Thani and Iranian Foreign Minister Mohammad Javad Zarif (2017)

During the Qatar diplomatic crisis, Iran provided diplomatic and economic support to Qatar. On 5 June 2017, the date that the crisis erupted, Iran asked the Arab nations to settle their dispute through dialogue. After Saudi Arabia and its Persian Gulf allies blocked Qatar economically, Iran began sending food supplies to the country, including daily shipments of 1,100 tons of fruit and vegetables and 66 tons of beef. On 25 June, Iranian president Hassan Rouhani denounced the "siege" on Qatar, and in a phone call with Emir Tamim, he said that "Tehran will stand by Qatar's government". He also noted that Iran's airspace was open to Qatari aircraft.

On 23 August 2017, it was announced that Qatar would be returning its ambassador to Iran. In a press statement released by Qatar's Foreign Affairs Ministry, Qatar expressed its willingness to improve bilateral ties with Iran.

On 26 August 2018, during a phone conversation between Emir of Qatar and Iranian President Rouhani, Sheikh Tamim bin Hamad Al-Thani stated that, "thanks to the integrity and solidarity of Qatari people and cooperation and help of friend countries, especially Iran, we have overcome the issues of the unjust, cruel siege and we will never forget Iran's stances in this regard".

=== COVID-19 pandemic ===
During the COVID-19 pandemic, Qatar sent five shipments of urgent medical assistance to Iran including respirators, sanitizers, and vaccines between March 2020 and September 2021.

=== 2022: allegations of cooperation on suppressing protests at the FIFA World Cup in Qatar ===
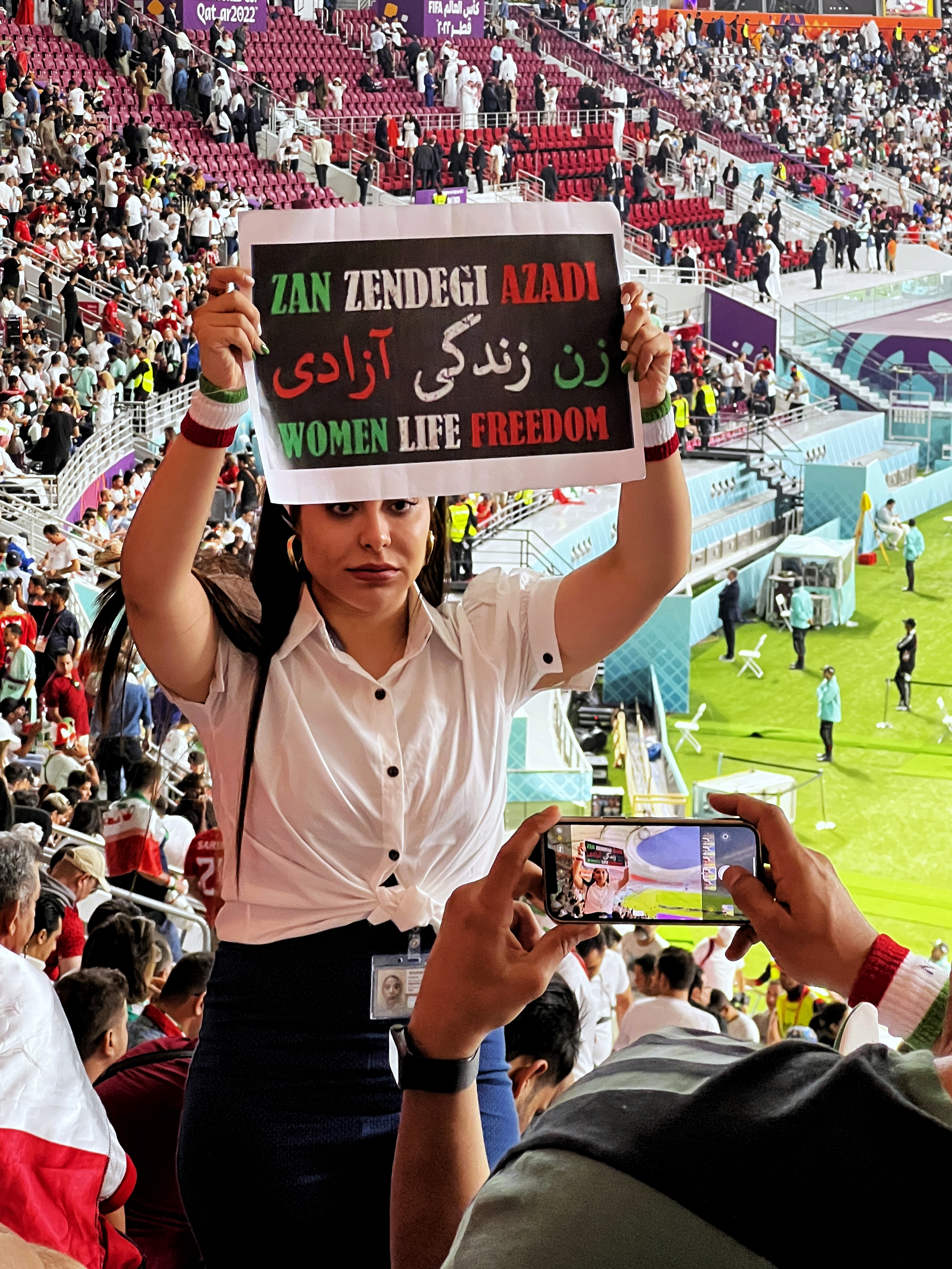
An Iranian fan showing a banner with "Woman, Life, Freedom" slogan.

In November 2022, there were reports suggesting that the government of Iran were working with Qatari officials to suppress anti-government protests at the 2022 FIFA World Cup, in light of the Mahsa Amini protests. Leaked documents and audio clips suggested that Iranian government officials were in correspondence with Qatari authorities in order to handle possible protesters.

In November 2022, the Qatari government revoked the visas of journalists from a London-based Iranian news channel, Iran International, known for being critical of the regime, who were seeking to cover the World Cup. On 21 November 2022, during the first group stage match from Group B, between Iran and England, attempts were reportedly made by the stadium's security forces to block Iranian fans who wore clothing or carried items bearing slogans that were deemed unsympathetic to the Islamic government of Iran. These included T-shirts and signs with "Woman, Life, Freedom" embedded onto them, Iran's previous flags such as the Lion and Sun flag, or any slogans containing the name of Mahsa Amini. This crackdown continued throughout all of Iran's matches at the World Cup. In addition to removing fans from stadiums, reports showed that officials tried to suppress any filming or photography of possible protests. In one case, Qatari police detained Danish TV presenter, Rasmus Tantholdt, for filming fans with "Woman, Life, Freedom" slogans, some of whom who had been earlier abused by a group of pro-government supporters.

=== 2023 ===
In July 2023, Emir Tamim bin Hamad Al Thani received Iranian Foreign Minister Hossein Amirabdollahian in Doha. They discussed the further development of trade ties, bilateral relations, and holding a joint economic commission in the future.

Qatar mediated a deal between the United States and Iran, which saw the release of five prisoners in each country and the unfreezing of US$6 billion of Iranian funds in September 2023, which had been frozen due to sanctions imposed by the U.S. Iranian Deputy Foreign Minister for Political Affairs Ali Bagheri, who was Iran's lead negotiator during the mediation efforts, thanked the government of Qatar for its efforts to "free Iran's financial resources" and its dedication to bilateral and multilateral relations. During the 78th session of the United Nations General Assembly, Qatari officials set up meetings with both countries, hoping to make progress on further talks regarding Iran's uranium enrichment and export of drones.

=== 2025 Iranian strike on Qatar ===
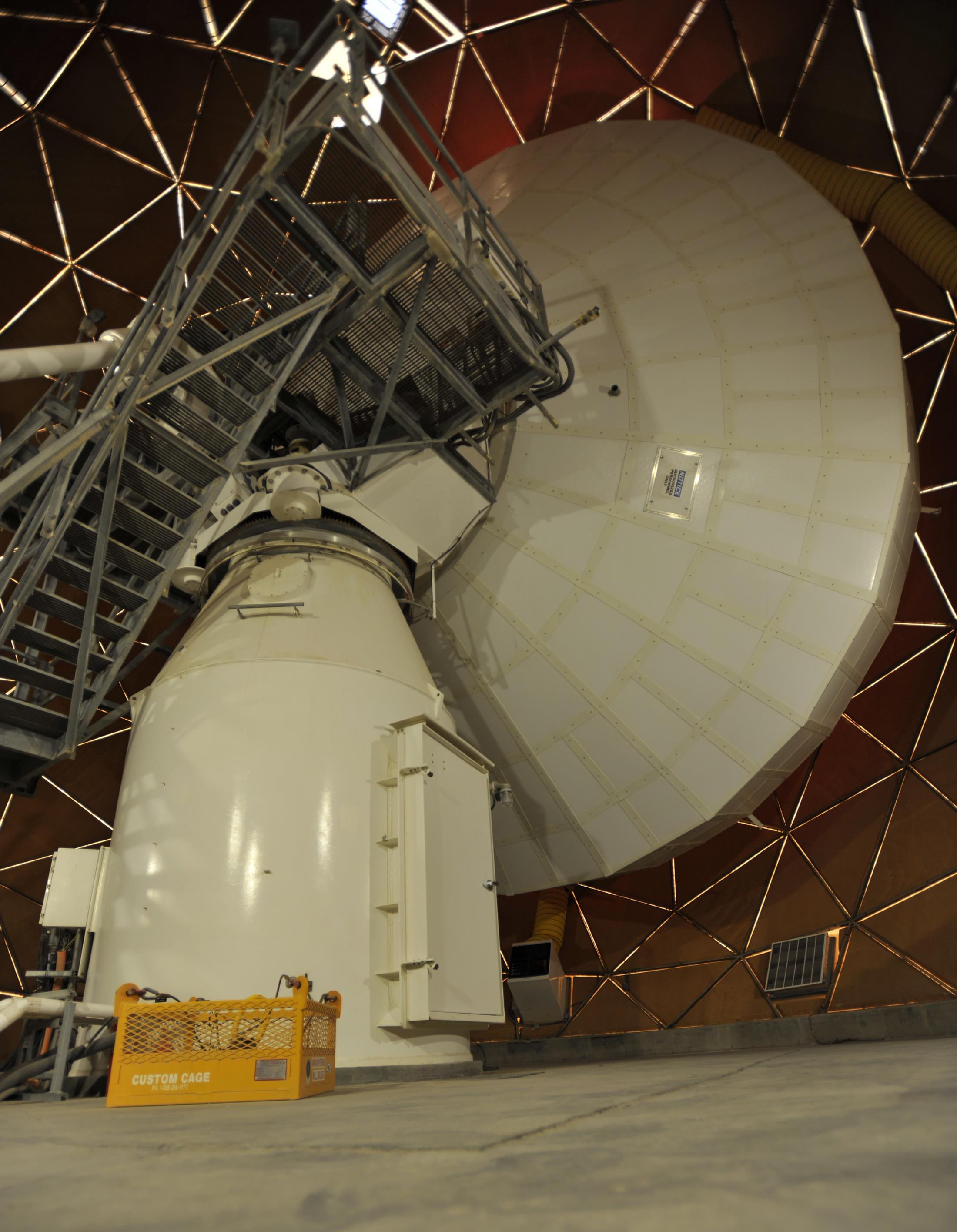
The Modernized Enterprise Terminal at Al Udeid Air Base, reportedly damaged by one of the missiles

On June 23, 2025, Qatar shut down its airspace following a warning from Iran through diplomatic channels that they would strike Al Udeid Air Base in response to June 21 U.S. strikes on Iranian nuclear facilities and the U.S. presence there. A few hours later, Iran fired missiles on the Al Udeid Air Base. Iran's Supreme National Security Council issued a statement, "this action does not pose any threat to the friendly and brotherly country, Qatar, and its noble people, and the Islamic Republic of Iran remains committed to maintaining and continuing warm and historic relations with Qatar". Qatar condemned the attack on its air base alongside several other Arab countries. Qatari foreign ministry spokesperson Majed al-Ansari stated, "there are deep ties between the two states [Iran and Qatar] and the two nations, but the attack undoubtedly calls for a genuine meeting and a clear stance". Qatar reopened its airspace early on June 24.

During a diplomatic visit to Qatar in September 2025 by Iranian foreign minister Abbas Araghchi, he stated that "there are no differences between the two countries, and the misunderstanding that had arisen has been fully resolved through this visit". This statement was made after Araghchi had what he described as "productive" discussions with Qatari government officials, including his foreign minister counterpart, Mohammed bin Abdulrahman Al Thani.

=== 2026 Iranian strikes on Qatar ===
In 2026, Iran fired retaliatory missiles to Qatar as part of the Iran-Israel-United States conflict, prompting the closure of its airspace and major disruptions at Hamad International Airport in Doha. On 28 February, Qatari air defenses intercepted a barrage of 66 missiles, but falling shrapnel injured 16 people and led to over 100 impact reports nationwide. The Qatari Ministry of Foreign Affairs condemned the attacks as a "blatant violation of sovereignty."

Additional strikes on 2 March targeted key sites including the airport, though officials said the missiles were intercepted and emphasized that Qatar would not escalate the conflict. That same day, Qatar's Ministry of Defence reported downing two Iranian Sukhoi Su-24 bombers, which according to anonymous sources were on their way to attack the American Al Udeid Air Base and gas production facilities in Ras Laffan Industrial City.

The Ministry of Defence also announced on 2 March that Ras Laffan and Mesaieed Industrial Area were struck by two Iranian drones. QatarEnergy soon announced that it has ceased all production of natural gas and its associated products, reportedly on order by Energy Minister Saad Sherida al-Kaabi. It later announced that it was declaring force majeure on its contracts with buyers, and internal sources speaking to Reuters said that it would soon be shutting down gas liquefication, and that restarting it would take weeks. These announcements caused increases in world gas prices, which analysts said was a part of the Iranian government's plan to apply pressure on the world to stop the war.

On 3 March, 2026 an Iranian ballistic missile struck Al Udeid Air Base, marking the first direct hit on the facility during the conflict. Following the attacks, Emir Tamim bin Hamad Al Thani suspended all diplomatic mediation efforts between Iran and the West. On 4 March, the Ministry of Interior announced the arrest of 10 individuals linked to two IRGC-run cells tasked with espionage and sabotage.

On March 6, Qatari Energy Minister Saad al-Kaabi warned that if the war continues other Gulf energy producers may be forced to halt exports and declare force majeure, and that "this will bring down economies of the world". This announcement caused a jump in global oil prices.

Also on March 6, it was reported that according to satellite imagery analysis by both Bloomberg and the Energy Economics and Society Research Institute in Tokyo, Ras Laffan, the main gas facility in Qatar, appears to have not been damaged before the "unprecedented shutdown" which sent fuel prices higher. On March 18, 2026, following an Iranian strike on Qatar's massive natural gas facility, it ordered Iran's military and security attaches, along with their staff, to leave the country within 24 hours.

=== Renewal of maritime trade ===
On 5 July 2026, Iranian state media reported that Iran and Qatar renewed maritime trade following an almost five-month halt.

== Diplomatic relations ==
=== Cooperation ===
The two countries historically had a close economic relationship, particularly in the oil and gas industries. Iran and Qatar jointly control the world's largest natural gas field along their maritime border.

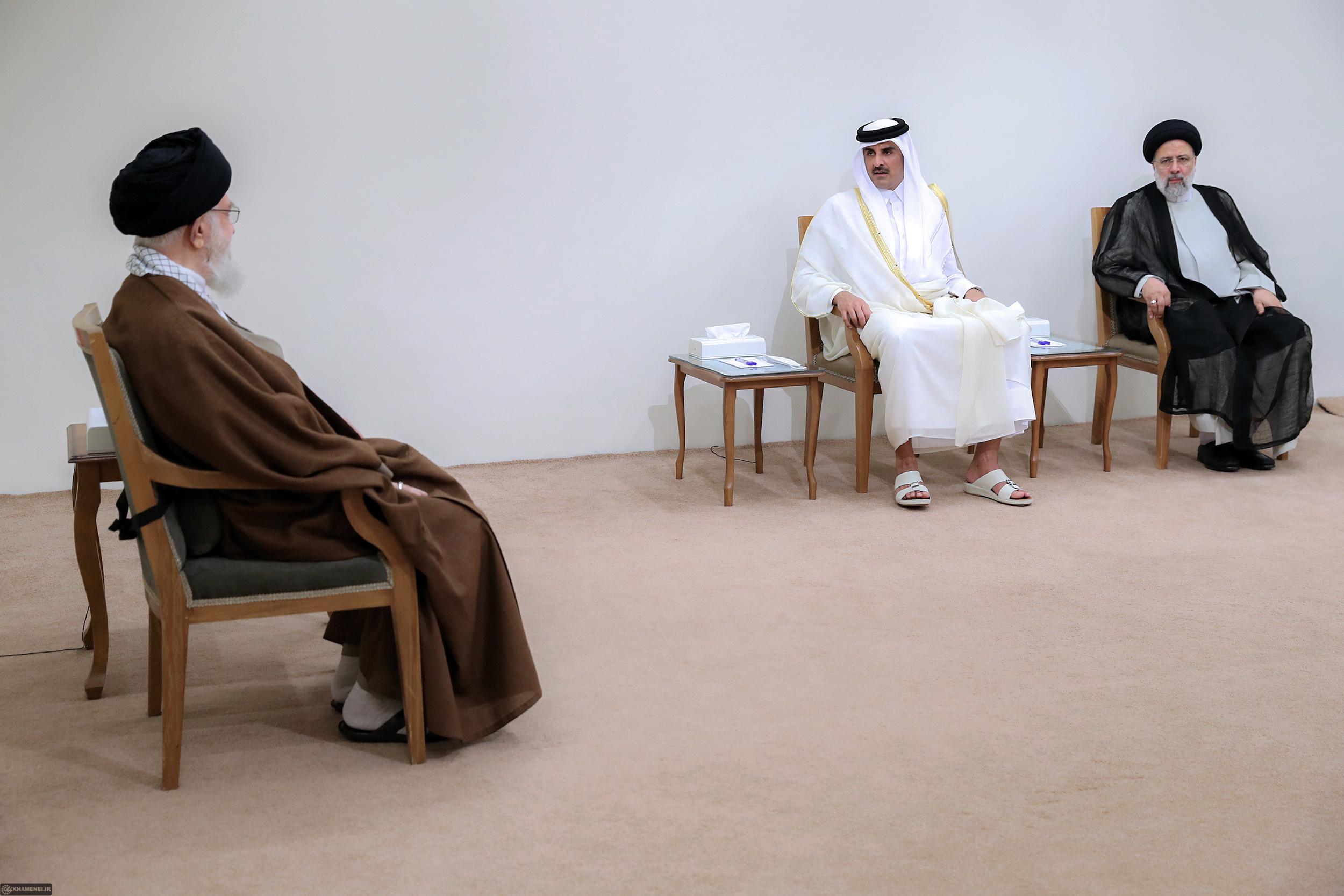
Qatari Emir Tamim bin Hamad Al Thani with Iran's Ayatollah Ali Khamenei in Tehran, 12 May 2022

On 12 April 2022, Iran struck several of agreements with Qatar in the hopes of hosting fans for the 2022 FIFA World Cup, which was hosted in Qatar. According to the Qatar News Agency, the two countries signed an agreement for operations to connect the Doha Flight Information Region (FIR) with the Tehran FIR. They also agreed to expand the number of flights between them and talked about ways to improve transportation cooperation and private investment prospects in the port sector.

=== Tensions ===
Qatar has experienced difficulties in maintaining a stable relationship with Iran while adhering to the multilateral policies of the Gulf Cooperation Council (GCC). Some analysts perceive Qatar as attempting to appease both sides to maintain their self interests. However, balancing concurrent cordial relations with the GCC and Iran has led to tensions between Qatar and its GCC allies; for example, Qatar and Iran's close ties were cited as one of the primary reasons behind the Qatar diplomatic crisis in 2017. Furthermore, such close diplomatic cooperation has resulted in accusations of Qatar supporting Iranian-funded militant groups such as the Houthis in Yemen.

On 2 July 2011, the GCC unanimously agreed to have a combined military force, leading to an increase of double the current troop size. Political analyst Sami Al-Faraj stated that the decision was made in order to counter a growing threat from Iran "and its subversive terrorist elements across the GCC".

== Economic relations ==
=== Oil and gas ===
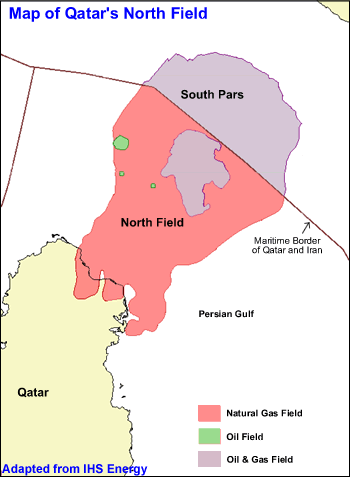
South Pars/North Dome Field

The world's largest natural gas field, called North Field in Qatar and South Pars in Iran, stretches across the maritime border between the two countries. The gas field covers 97,000 square km with the majority (about two-thirds) lying in Qatari waters. As of early 2026, before the beginning of the US-Iran war, Qatar has produced approximately 18.5 billion cubic feet per day from the field, accounting for around 80% of Qatari government revenues, while daily production on the Iranian side was estimated to be around only 2 billion cubic feet. Iran's inefficient exploitation of the shared gas field is often attributed to Western sanctions, isolation and mismanagement. These have also caused the Iranian government to lag behind on pressurization efforts on their side of the field, which causes more gas to migrate to the Qatari side of the field.

== Diplomatic missions ==
Building of the Iranian Embassy in Qatar in the Onaiza district of Doha

The Iranian embassy is located in Doha.

The Qatari embassy is located in Tehran.

== See also ==
- Foreign relations of Iran
- Foreign relations of Qatar
- Iranians in Qatar
- Qatar–Saudi Arabia relations
- Qatar–Saudi Arabia diplomatic conflict
- Qatar diplomatic crisis
- Iran–Saudi Arabia relations
- Iran–Saudi Arabia proxy conflict
