= Zone 96, Qatar =

Zone 96
- Zone
- Interactive map of Zone 96
- Coordinates: 24.821184°N 50.981505°E
- Country: Qatar
- Municipality: Al Rayyan
- Blocks: 40

Area
  - Total: 801.7 km^{2} (309.5 sq mi)

Population
  - Total: 984 (2,015)
- Time zone: UTC+03 (Arabia Standard Time)
- ISO 3166 code: QA-RA

Zone 96 is a zone of the municipality of Al Rayyan in Qatar. The main district recorded in the 2015 population census was Abu Samra.

Other districts which fall within its administrative boundaries are Al Aamriya, Eglat Faisal, Lusail West, and Umm Hawta.

== Demographics ==
As of the 2010 census, the zone comprised 484 housing units and 61 establishments. There were 1065 people living in the zone, of which 78% were male and 22% were female. Out of the 1,065 inhabitants, 90% were 20 years of age or older and 10% were under the age of 20. The literacy rate stood at 93.4%.

Employed persons made up 76% of the total population. Females accounted for 10% of the working population, while males accounted for 90% of the working population.

Year	Population
1986	594
1997	683
2004	786
2010	1,065
2015	984

== Land use ==
The Ministry of Municipality and Environment (MME) breaks down land use in the zone as follows.

Area (km^{2})	Developed land (km^{2})	Undeveloped land (km^{2})	Residential (km^{2})	Commercial/ Industrial (km^{2})	Education/ Health (km^{2})	Farming/ Green areas (km^{2})	Other uses (km^{2})
801.75	43.11	758.64	0.23	0.66	0.22	5.42	36.58
