= Iranians in Qatar =

Qatari Persians عجم القطر/فرس القطر (in Arabic) پارس‌های قطر/ایرانیان قطر (in Persian)

Regions with significant populations
- Doha

Languages
- Persian

Religion
- Sunni Islam, Shi'a Islam

Related ethnic groups
- Iranian diaspora (Iranians of UAE • Ajam of Bahrain • Ajam of Iraq • 'Ajam of Kuwait • Iranians of Canada • Iranians of America • Iranians of UK • Iranians of Germany • Iranians of Israel • Iranians in Turkey) Iranian Peoples (Lurs, Achomis, Baluchs, Kurds, Iranian Azeris), Turkic peoples (Qashqai, Azerbaijanis), Huwala

Iranians in Qatar or Qatari Persians accounts for some 30,000 people of the Iranian diaspora.

In 1908 the Qatar population was numbered at 27,000. Out of 27,000 inhabitants there were 425 Iranian boat builders. By the year 1930 the number of Iranians were increased to 5000, an increase of 20% in the population.

== See also ==
- Iran–Qatar relations
- Iranian diaspora
- Ethnic groups in Qatar
