= Umm Hawta =

Umm Hawta أم حوطة
- Village
- Location within Qatar
- Coordinates: 24°51′54″N 51°03′36″E
- Country: Qatar
- Municipality: Al Rayyan
- Zone no.: Zone 96
- District no.: 712

Area
  - Total: 14.6 km^{2} (5.6 sq mi)

Umm Hawta (Arabic: أم حوطة, romanized: Umm Ḩawţah, lit. 'mother of the fence'; also spelled Umm Houta) is a village in southern Qatar, located in the municipality of Al Rayyan.

The village of Al Aamriya is nearby to the south.

Qatar's armed forces operate a military installation known as Umm Hawta Camp in the area.

== Etymology ==
The name consists of two Arabic components. The term umm, meaning "mother", is commonly used in Qatar as a prefix in toponyms to denote a place distinguished by a notable feature. The second element, hawta, translates to "fence". The name is thought to refer to a series of pale hills encircling a nearby rawda (depression), forming a natural enclosure reminiscent of a fence.

== Gallery ==
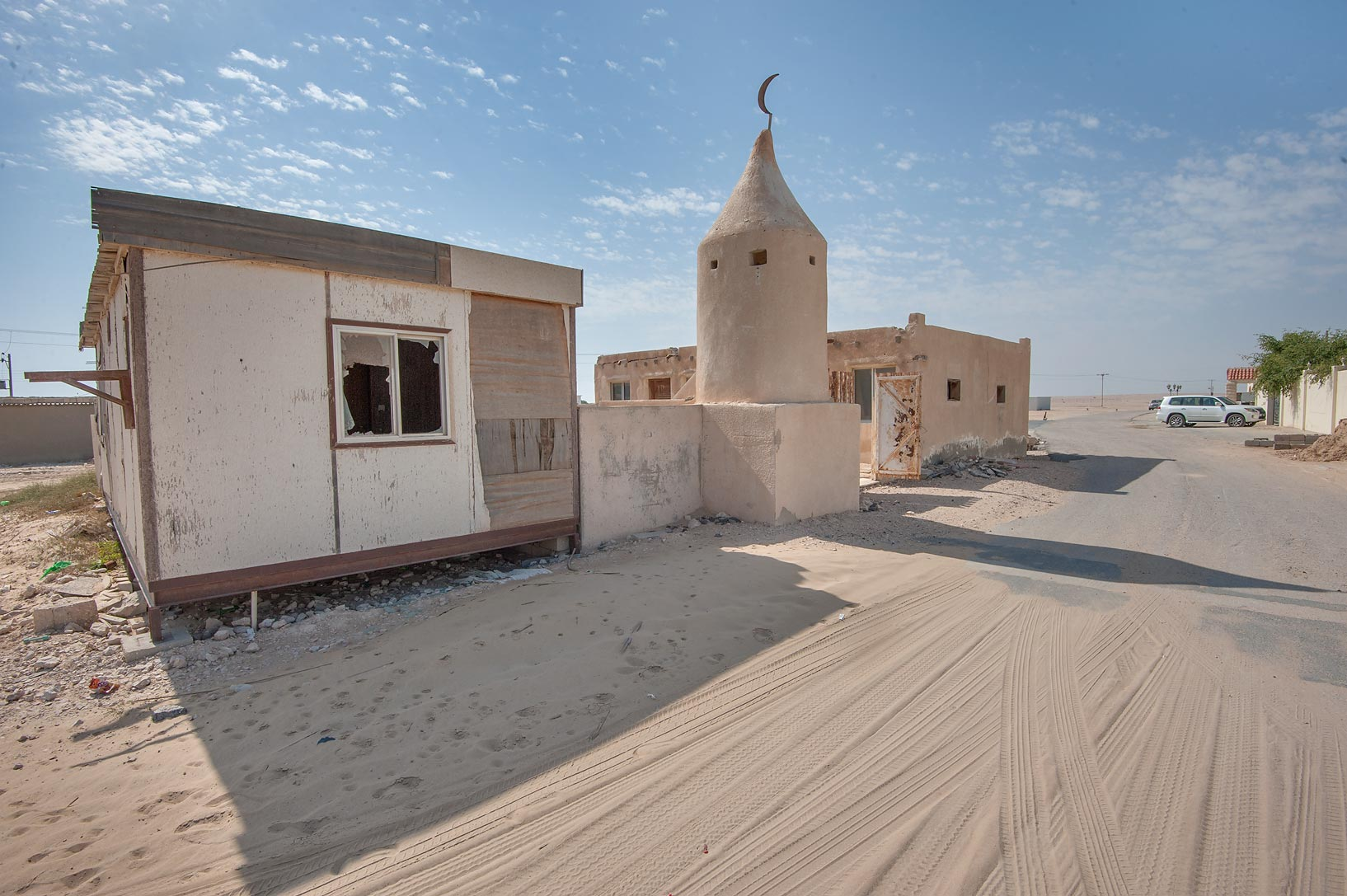
Mosque in Umm Hawtah
