= Al Aamriya =

Al Aamriya العامرية
- Village
- Location within Qatar
- Coordinates: 24.82073°N 51.07696°E
- Country: Qatar
- Municipality: Al Rayyan
- Zone no.: Zone 96
- District no.: 719

Area
  - Total: 30.05 km^{2} (11.60 sq mi)

Al Aamriya (Arabic: العامرية) is a village in southern Qatar, located in the municipality of Al Rayyan.

The village of Umm Hawta, to the north, is nearby.

== Etymology ==
The village was named after the capture of one of the sheikhs and multiple tribe members of the Al Awamir tribe by a singular border guard “Mohammed bin Jaber Al Lebdah Al Athba Al marri ” during the Qatari-Abu Dhabi War. The sheikh of Qatar Jassim bin Mohammed Al Thani Then celebrated this victory by naming the area where they were captured “Al-Aamriyah”.

== Gallery ==
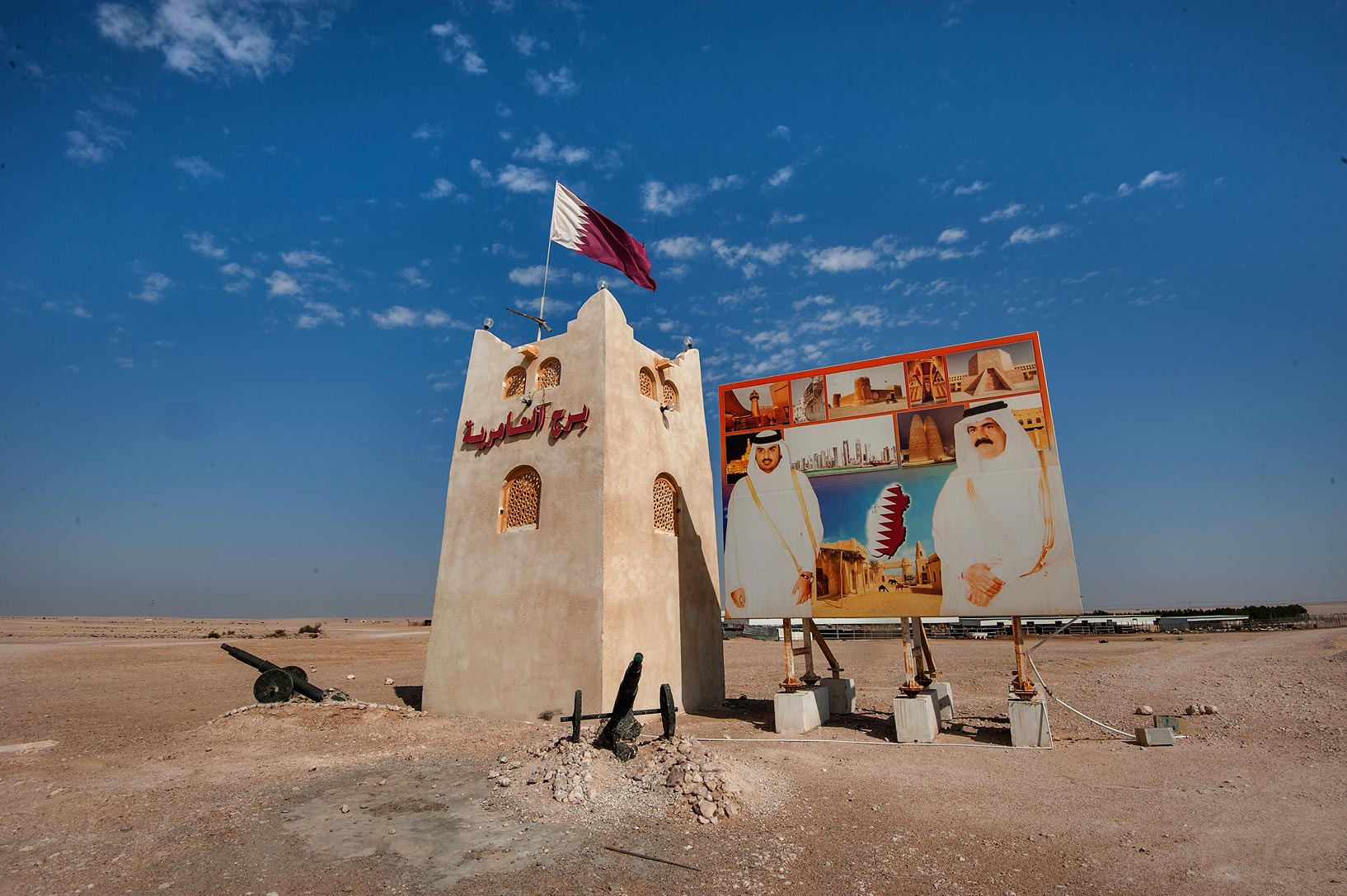
Entrance to Al Aamriya
