= Salwa Canal =

Proposed canal on Saudi peninsula

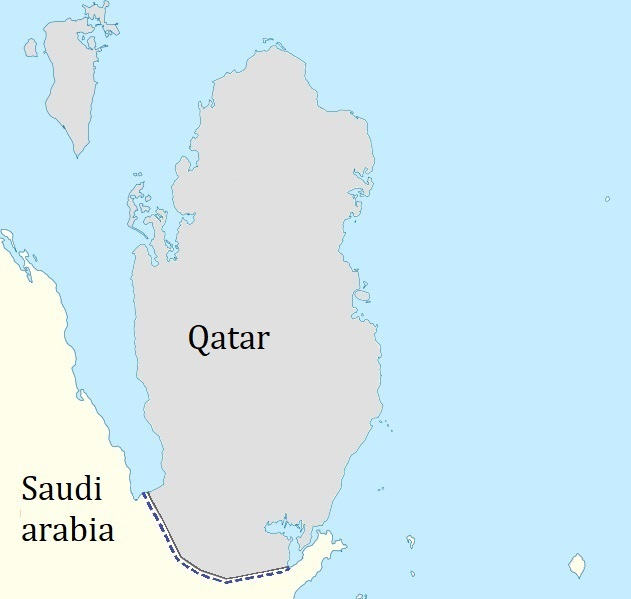
- The canal would be south of the border between Saudi Arabia and Qatar.
- Interactive map of Salwa Canal

Specifications
- Length: 70 km (43 miles)
- Minimum boat draft: 12 m (39 ft)
- Status: Abandoned

The Salwa Canal was a proposed shipping route and tourism project through Saudi Arabia along its border with Qatar, effectively turning the latter into an island. The project appears to be abandoned for the present.

== Background ==
In June 2017, Saudi Arabia and a number of countries cut diplomatic relations with Qatar and imposed a land, sea, and air blockade.

== Proposal ==
The tender was scheduled to take place on 25 June 2018. According to the publication Makkah Al-Mukarramah, the company with the winning bid was to be announced within 90 days of the bid closure date, after which it was to begin digging of the channel immediately in order to complete the project within a one-year time frame.

The proposed waterway is 200 m (660 ft) wide and will be dug to a depth of up to 20 m (66 ft) providing a maximum ship draft of 12 m (39 ft). This would allow the canal to accommodate cargo, container and passenger ships up to a length of 295 m (968 ft). The preliminary cost has been estimated at SR2.8bn (US$747m). The proposal includes building resorts with private beaches, the construction of ports, the possibility of a free trade zone, a military zone, and a dumping ground for nuclear waste.

Saudi media report the project could be completed within 12 months, comparing it to the second, 72 km (45 mi) lane, of the Suez Canal which took about 12 months to finish. However, only half of the distance involved digging new waterways while the remainder was only widening existing channels.

Some media sources seem to prefer a route avoiding maritime boundary passing through Khor Al Adaid, which is a bay and nature reserve also under the Tentative List of the World Heritage Site and mostly shared in a maritime border with Qatar.

== See also ==
- Panama Canal
- Nicaragua Canal
- Gulf of Salwah
