= Gulf of Salwah =

Coordinates: 24°50′N 50°47′E

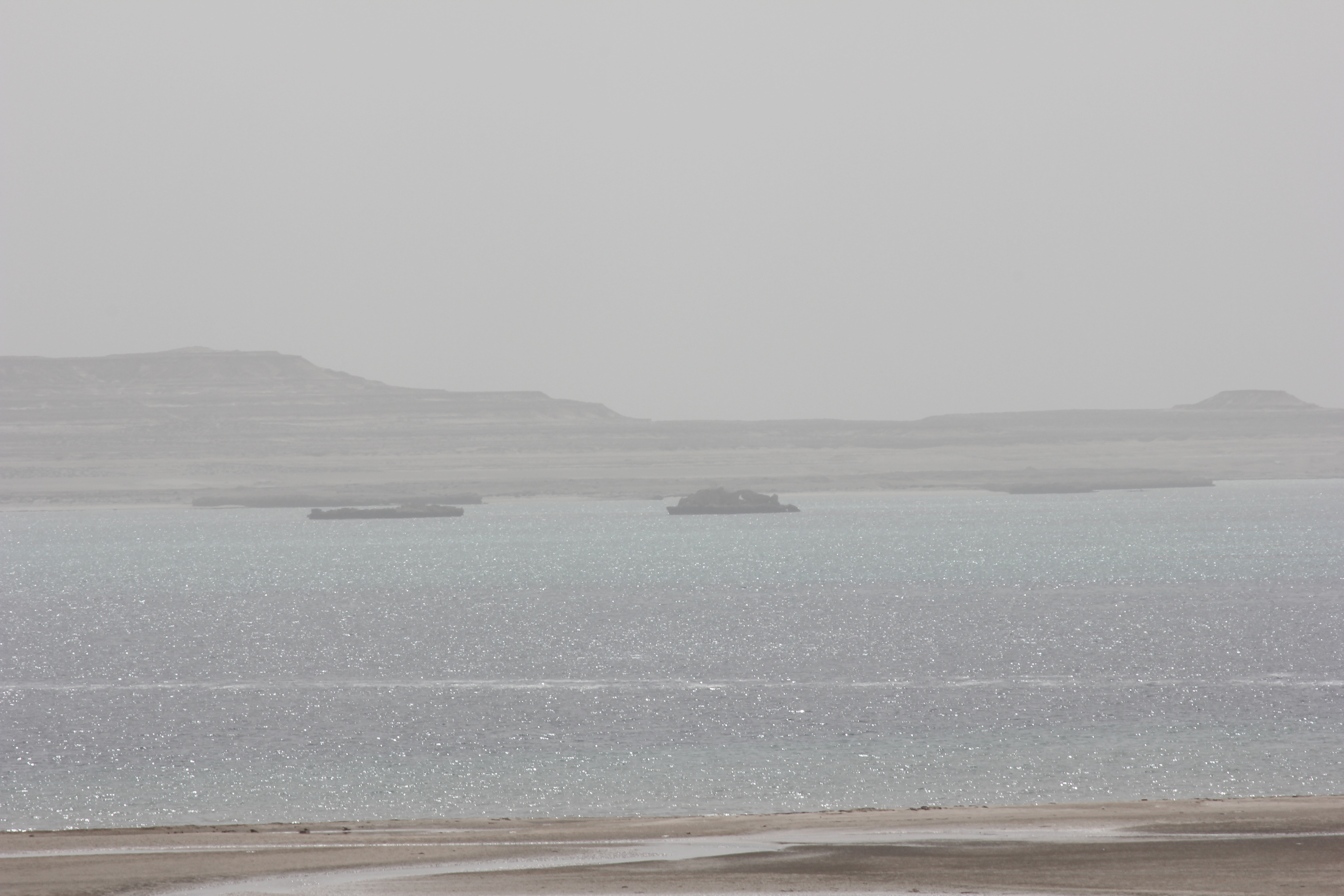
Water separating Qatar and Saudi Arabia

The Gulf of Salwah (Dawhat Salwah) is the southern portion of the Gulf of Bahrain. The Gulf of Salwah is a narrow bay separating the peninsula of Qatar from Saudi Arabia. It is bordered to the west by a well-vegetated shoreland containing palm trees and reed beds. To the east are low cliffs and hills, with sand dunes and salt flats at the southern end.

== Geography ==
The Gulf of Salwah is an elongated bay extending southwards from the Gulf of Bahrain. It is about 80 km (50 mi) long and about 20 km (12 mi) wide at its widest point. To the west lies Saudi Arabia and to the east Qatar. The surface of the land surrounding the Gulf of Salwah is largely flat, covered with sand or pebbles. On the east side, there are sand dunes and salt flats at the southern end and low cliffs and hills further north on the west coast of Qatar, and this is the area where the main oilfields are located. On the west side of the Gulf the coast is sandy with high groundwater levels supporting extensive reed beds. There are shallow hypersaline lagoons, and low islands have appeared along the shore caused by changes of water level. The gulf itself is shallow with a base of sand and rock and meadows of seagrass.

The northern part of the Gulf of Salwah is restricted by coral reefs and accumulation of sediment. This results in the Gulf having a very small tidal range (around 0.5 m (20 in)) and a high salinity, as water evaporates from the surface and the remaining water is not exchanged with less-saline water.

== Fauna ==
The western shore of the gulf is a protected area known as the Gulf of Salwah Protected Area, and is designated as an Important Bird and Biodiversity Area. It is the main breeding ground of the Socotra cormorant in Saudi Arabia. Other birds that breed here include the Caspian tern, white-cheeked tern, lesser crested tern and bridled tern. Migratory birds that overwinter here include the western reef heron, black-necked grebe, great crested grebe, Pallas's gull, slender-billed gull and Caspian gull.

The high salinity level of the Gulf of Salwah prevents growth of most corals, perforate foraminifera, scallops and gastropod molluscs such as Strombus, Xenophora and Conus.

== See also ==
- Salwa Canal
