= Rassd News Network =

Digital journalism collective

- شبكة رصد الاخبارية
- Abbreviation: RNN
- Founder: Ahmed Amin, Amr Salama Elqazaz, Amr Farrag, Khaled Noureldin, Abdullah Alfakharany, Samhy Mostafa, Khaled faheem
- Type: Digital journalism collective
- Location: Egypt Turkey
- Region served: North Africa, Middle East
- Official language: Arabic
- Website: www.rassd.com

Rassd News Network, also known by its initials of RNN (Arabic:شبكة رصد الاخبارية), is an alternative media network based in Cairo, Egypt. RNN was launched as a Facebook-based news source launched on January 25, 2011. It quickly advanced to become a primary contributor of Egyptian revolution-related news that year. Applying the motto "From the people to the people," the citizen journalists who created RNN have since added a Twitter feed and launched an independent website dedicated to short news stories favored by an online audience.

RNN is an organized citizen news network with four working committees; one for editing the news, another to support the correspondents covering Egypt, a third for managing the multimedia feeds and a fourth for staff functions such as development, training and public relations. RNN's Arabic name, Rassd, is an acronym that stands for Rakeb (observe), Sawwer (record) and Dawwen (blog). RNN created a Ustream channel on January 27, 2011, and a YouTube account a month later.

The success of RNN and its new social media model is evidenced in its recent local network expansion into Libya, Morocco, Syria, Jerusalem and Turkey. Even so, one media scholar in the US (commenting in 2011) called the accuracy of RNN's reporting "fairly mediocre".

RNN has endured closures of their Facebook profile and YouTube account as part of the attacks from private media, attempting to thwart their work and influence their content.

== Use of RNN's news by international media ==
RNN has been a global source of Egyptian revolution-related news since its launch. During the early days of the citizen uprisings across the Middle East, major networks such as BBC, Reuters, Al Jazeera and Al Arabiya used some of Rassd's news and photos, and followed the network on Twitter. Three days after the online portal went live it was streaming video to MSNBC through its Facebook page. Then on February 5, 2011, Louisville's NBC-affiliate cited RNN, Cairo when it reported that President Hosni Mubarak had stepped down as head of Egypt's ruling party.

== See also ==
- Arab Spring
- Mosul Eye
