= Saudi-led intervention in Bahrain =

2011 military intervention

- Part of Bahraini uprising of 2011, the Arab Spring, and the Iran–Saudi Arabia proxy conflict
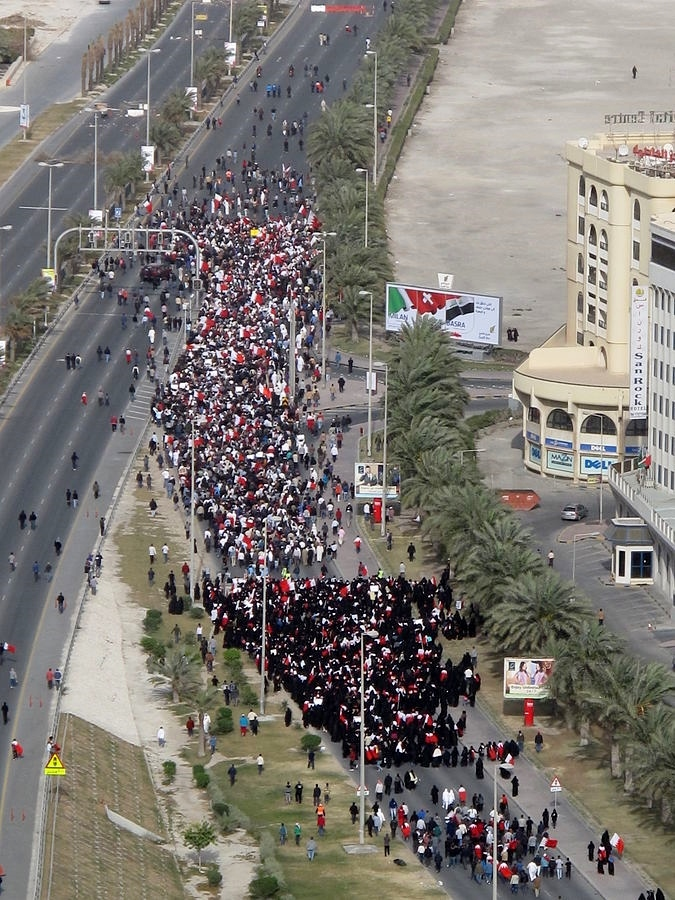
- Hundreds of protesters denouncing the Saudi-led intervention in Bahrain in a march to the Saudi embassy in Manama on 15 March 2011
Date	14 March 2011 – 4 July 2011 (3 months, 2 weeks and 6 days) (minor police presence till March 2014)
Location	Bahrain
Result	Saudi-led coalition victory: Suppression of Bahraini opposition demonstrators with GCC support.

Belligerents
Peninsula Shield Force: Saudi Arabia; United Arab Emirates; Kuwait; Bahrain	(Bahrain) Bahraini opposition

Strength
(Cooperation Council for the Arab States of the Gulf) Peninsula Shield Force: 1,500 troops: SANG: 1,000 policemen; United Arab Emirates: 500 policemen; Kuwait: Naval support	Thousands of protesters

Casualties and losses
(Bahrain) 2 policemen killed (Cooperation Council for the Arab States of the Gulf) 2 policemen killed: Saudi Arabia: 1 policeman killed; United Arab Emirates: 1 policeman killed	6 protesters killed 400 wounded

The Saudi–led intervention in Bahrain began on 14 March 2011 to assist the Bahraini government in suppressing an anti-government uprising in the country. The intervention came three weeks after the U.S. pressured Bahrain to withdraw its military forces from the streets. As a decision by the Gulf Cooperation Council (GCC), the intervention included sending 1,000 (1,200) troops with vehicles from Saudi Arabia at the invitation of the Al-Khalifa ruling family, marking the first time the GCC used such a collective military option for suppressing a revolt.

Calling it both an occupation and a declaration of war, the Bahraini opposition pleaded for foreign help. The intervention was precedented by the 1994 Saudi intervention in Bahrain.

== Background ==
Bahrain protests began with the 14 February 2011 protest, mostly by the Shia Muslims making up the majority of Bahrain's population, which faced immediate reaction from government. The protests initially sought greater political freedom and equality for the majority Shia population, and expanded to a call to end the monarchy of Hamad bin Isa Al Khalifa following a deadly night raid on 17 February 2011 against protesters at the Pearl Roundabout in Manama.

Protesters blocked roads and their sheer numbers overwhelmed the Bahrain police. The government of Bahrain requested help from neighbouring countries. On 14 March, the Gulf Cooperation Council (GCC) agreed to deploy Peninsula Shield Force troops to Bahrain to secure key installations.

== Units involved ==
GCC responded to the request from Bahrain's Al-Khalifa by sending its Peninsula Shield Force. The units sent from Saudi included 1,000 (1,200) troops along with 150 vehicles. The vehicles included "wheeled, light-armored vehicles with roof-mounted heavy machine guns". Saudi soldiers were apparently from Saudi Arabian National Guard, commanded by a son of King Abdullah, Prince Miteb. Also, 500 United Arab Emirates (UAE) policemen were sent via the causeway between Saudi Arabia and Bahrain. Kuwait sent their navy to patrol the borders of Bahrain. According to an Al Jazeera report, Pakistani former servicemen were recruited into the Bahraini National Guard.

By 2014, 5,000 Saudi and Emirati forces were positioned "less than 10 miles from the Pearl Roundabout, the center of the country's protest movement".

== Goals ==
Bahrain's strategic importance to Saudi Arabian government is originated from economic, sectarian and geopolitical reasons.

=== Sectarian and geopolitical goals ===
The real purpose of the intervention was to stop "a growing rebellion by the kingdom's majority, but deprived ... Shia citizens" by taking all necessary measures. Death of an Emirati policeman, Tariq al-Shehi, made it clear that the foreign troops were in fact involved in suppressing protests. According to Nuruzzaman, the most important factor leading to Saudi's intervention in Bahrain, is "the domino effect of Bahrain's fall into Shia hands". Concerned about their own Shia population and fearful of democratic change, Saudi king Abdullah sought to reverse the pro-democracy movements in his neighbor countries using force. Saudi Arabia maintained that the cause of unrest in Saudi's eastern province, is the Shia uprising in Bahrain. According to Steffen Hertog, a Saudi Arabia expert at the London School of Economics and Political Science, Saudi's move was a signal to Shia movements in the Eastern Province to express how seriously Saudi intended to crack down the unrest. Moreover, keeping Al-Khalifa, "the key conservative Sunni ally of Saudi", in power was of notable importance to Saudi to avoid the spread of Iran's influence in west of Gulf. Saudi Arabia acted through GCC to mask its "strategic concern" about Iran and its influence.

As home of the United States Fifth Fleet, the events in Bahrain involved U.S. interests, too. Any Saudi departure from Bahrain and the assertion of Shia power would also directly affect U.S. interests and lead to weakening United States "military posture in the region".

=== Economic goals ===
The intervention was apparently carried out with the aim of guarding Bahrain's oil infrastructure. The two kingdoms have strong economical ties and Saudi Arabia had made significant investments in Bahrain's tourism, infrastructure and industry. Saudi Arabia, Bahrain's largest trading partner, sent troops to Bahrain to pursue some economic goals and among the important factors leading to sending troops to Bahrain were "the possibility of the loss of oil fields, terminals and crude processing plants, the loss of investment and future investment prospects". Moreover, any spill over of Bahrain's unrest into the neighbor kingdom would "upend" global oil markets.

== Attacks ==
On 3 March 2014, a remotely detonated bomb by protesters in the village of Al Daih killed 3 police officers. One of the police officers killed was an Emirati policeman from the Peninsula Shield Force. The two other officers killed were Bahraini policemen. On 15 January 2017, the Bahraini government passed a capital punishment sentence of execution by firing squad on three men found guilty for the bomb attack that killed the three security forces.

== Aftermath ==
Primarily interpreted by analysts "in terms of domestic and regional political and strategic dynamics", the intervention has created serious regional and global concerns and has turned the uprising into a regional cold war. Among other factors, the foreign military intervention may drive the sectarianism. According to Foreign Policy magazine, the intervention marked "a dramatic escalation of Bahrain's political crisis."

== Reactions ==
- UN: Ban Ki-moon, the Secretary General of the United Nations said that he was "troubled" by "the deployment of the Peninsula Shield Force" and that "the arrival of Saudi and UAE troops had been noted with "concern"". He asked all those involved to "exercise maximum restraint".
- Iran: Tehran asserted that the move was an invasion and accused the GCC of "meddling" in Bahrain's internal affairs."
- Pakistan: Nawaz Sharif, Pakistan's prime minister, supported the intervention and in his visit to Saudi Arabia he reassured that he would "help devise a new battle plan for Saudi intervention in the country".
- Turkey: Turkish Prime Minister, Recep Tayyip Erdogan, condemned the intervention and characterized the Saudi movement as "a new karbala." He demanded withdrawal of Saudi forces from Bahrain.
- United States: A representative described the government as "shocked" by the move but opposed Iran's characterization of the intervention as an invasion. The Obama administration "obliquely criticized" the action.

== See also ==
- Saudi Arabian-led intervention in Yemen
