= Abu Samra =

Settlement in Al Rayyan, Qatar

Abu Samra أبو سمرة
- Settlement
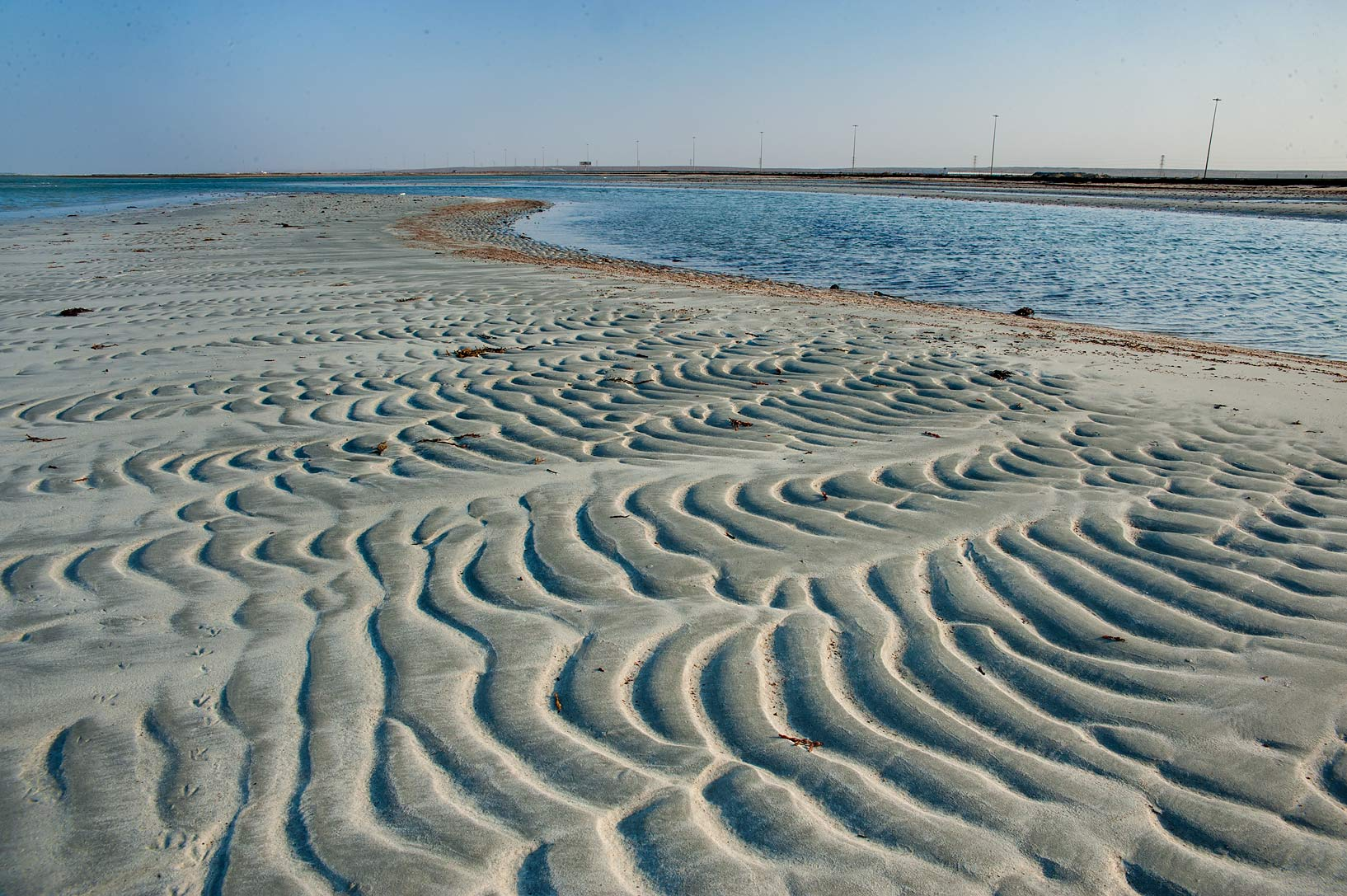
- Sand ripples on a beach in Abu Samra

- Location within Qatar
- Coordinates: 24°44′17″N 50°53′43″E
- Country: Qatar
- Municipality: Al Rayyan
- Zone: Zone 96
- District no.: 726

Area
  - Total: 24.6 km^{2} (9.5 sq mi)

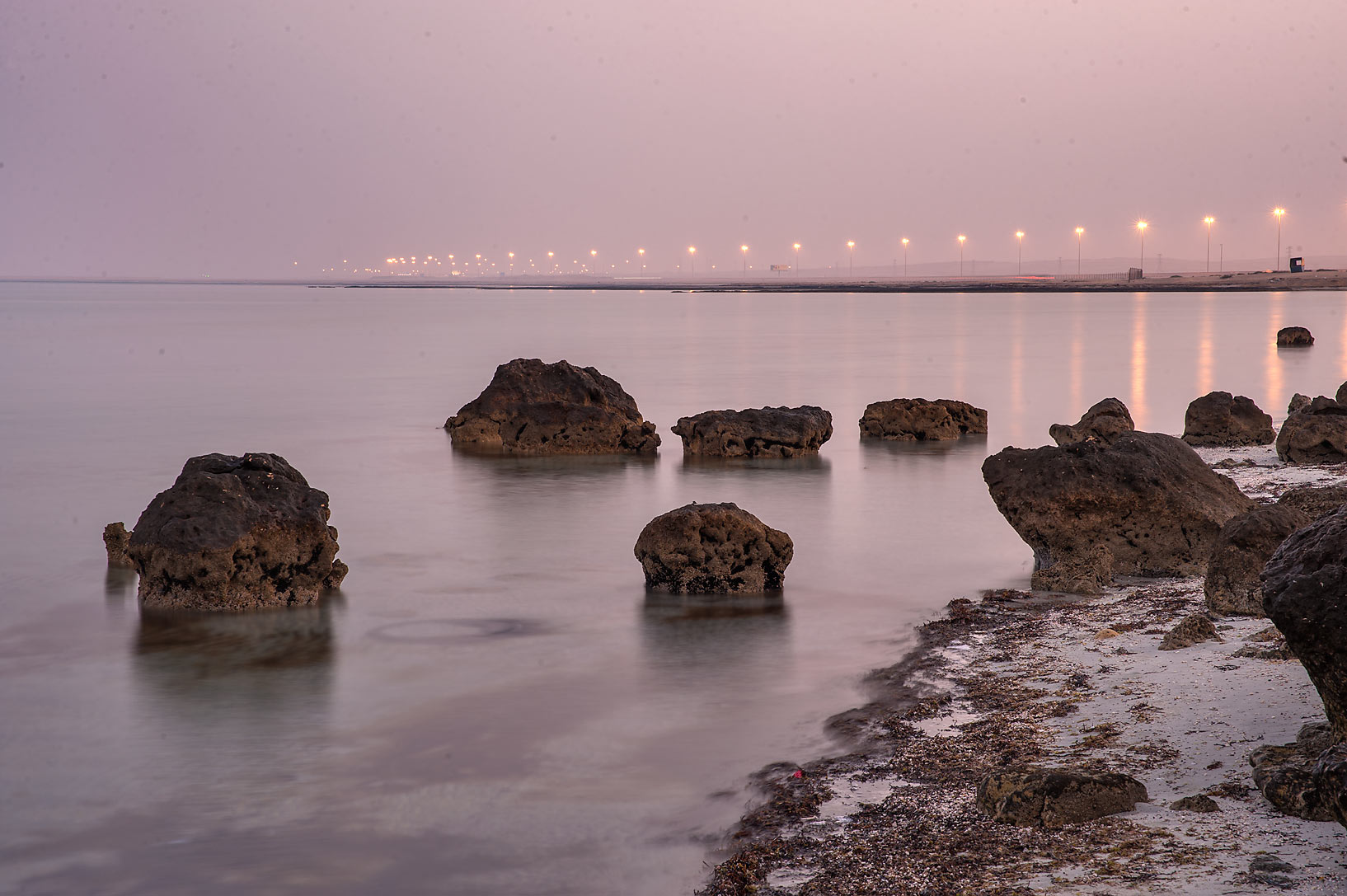
Rocks on a beach in Abu Samra near Salwa Road.

Abu Samra (Arabic: أبو سمرة, romanized: Abū Samrah) is a settlement in Qatar, located in the municipality of Al Rayyan (90 km from Doha). It used to be part of the Jariyan al Batnah municipality before the municipality was incorporated into Al Rayyan.

Notable features of the area are a border post separating the southern part of the municipality from Saudi Arabia, and a well. It was previously Qatar's only land border crossing to Saudi Arabia, until its closure in June 2017 over the Qatar diplomatic crisis. The border was opened again when the blockade ended in 2021.

== Etymology ==
The settlement derived its name from a local Samr tree. As the area contained one of the few Samr trees in the entire region, it was named Abu Samra, meaning "father of the Samr tree". The tree has local significance as it is used as fodder for camels.

== History ==
In 1970, the Salwa Highway was completed, becoming the first road to link the capital Doha to the border with Saudi Arabia at Abu Samra.

== Geography ==
Abu Samra is located in the southernmost part of Qatar, near the border with Saudi Arabia. It marks the southwestern edge of Qatar's southern desert region, which covers approximately 34.7% of the country's total area. Geographically, Abu Samra sits at the apex of a triangular area known as Al Urayq, which is characterized by sand dunes.

Qatar's capital, Doha, is located at a distance of 97 km to the north-east.

=== Land use ===
Abu Samra is located in Zone 96, a largely undeveloped zone characterized by undulating terrain dominated by small sand dunes. Of the zone's 801.7 square km area, only 43 square km of land is under use. Commercial and industrial establishments occupy 2% of its land, government offices occupy 4%, farmland takes up 11% and the remainder of developed land is categorized as "other", which includes under-construction developments.

=== Climate ===
According to the Qatar Meteorology Department, the lowest temperature in Qatar's recorded history is 1.5 degrees Celsius in Abu Samra in February 2017.

== Infrastructure ==
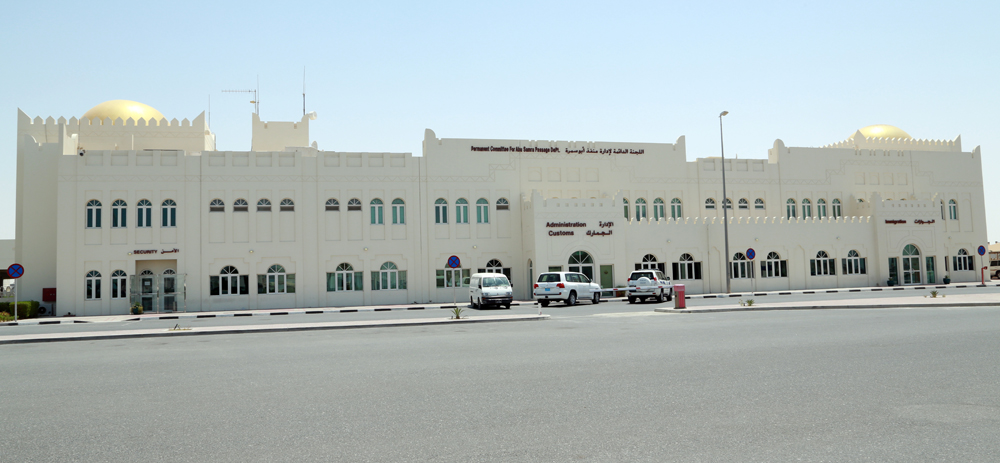
Immigrations and Customs offices in Abu Samra.

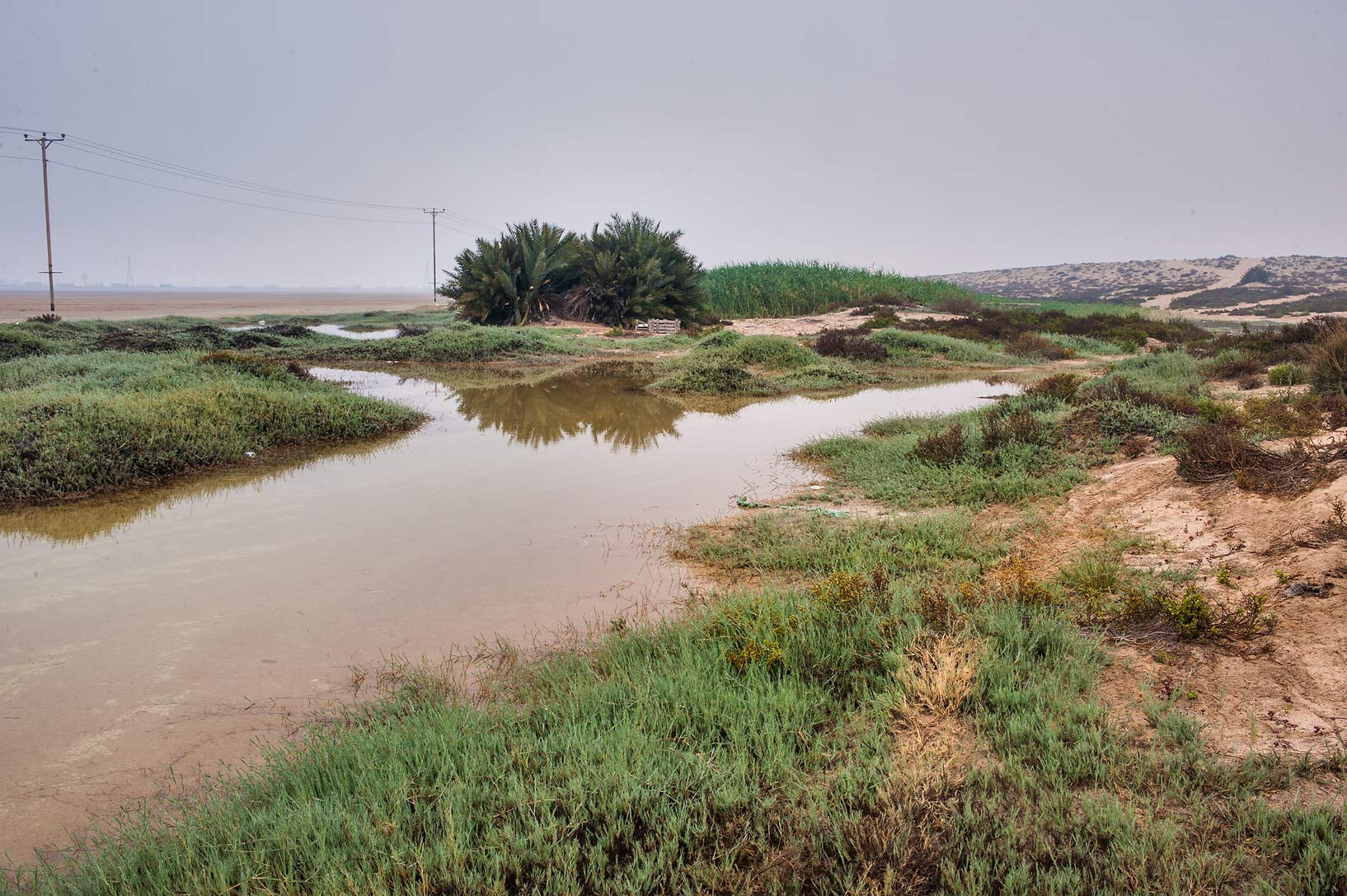
Spring of Qulmat Al Maszhabiya in Al Mashabiya Reserve, next to Abu Samra.

In 2015, the government announced the upcoming construction of an extensive tourist complex in Abu Samra. It was intended to cater towards Saudi tourists, who would commonly enter Qatar through the Abu Samra border crossing on the weekends.

Aside from the border crossing leading into Saudi Arabia, the Ministry of Interior has an Immigrations Department office and Customs Department office in the settlement. Saudi Arabia's Salwa border crossing is more than 8 km from the Abu Samra border crossing. On 5 June 2017, when a quartet composed of Saudi Arabia, the United Arab Emirates, Bahrain and Egypt severed ties with Qatar, the border crossing was shut down. Prior to its closure, it was the main route into Qatar of building supplies for 2022 World Cup projects as well as fresh produce.

A military base of the Qatar Armed Forces and a helipad are found here.

== Industry ==
The Qatari government established a large sheep farm here in the early 1980s in a bid to improve food self sufficiency. In 1982, the farm was producing 13,000 sheep annually, of which 4,000 were reserved exclusively for breeding.

A major desalination plant in Abu Samra was announced in 2010. At a cost of QAR 27 million, the plant was stated to have a potable water production capacity of 2,000 cubic meters per day, and had a projected completion date in 2011.
