= Qatar v United Arab Emirates (2019 AFC Asian Cup) =

2019 association football match between Qatar and the United Arab Emirates

2019 AFC Asian Cup semi-finals Blockade Derby
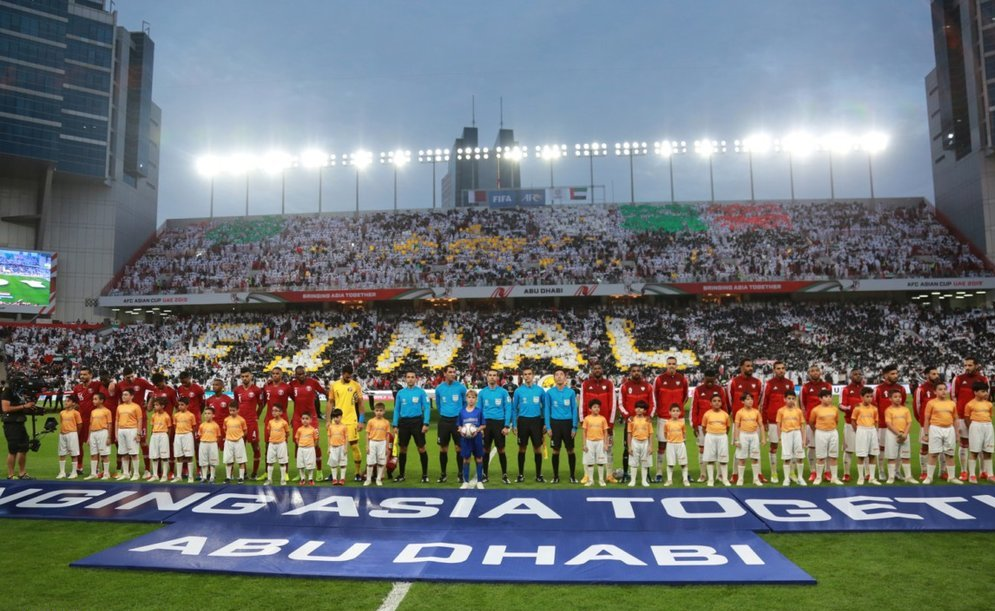
- The lineup of the two teams and the refereeing staff before the match
- Event: 2019 AFC Asian Cup
| Qatar | United Arab Emirates |
| (Qatar) | (United Arab Emirates) |
| 4 | 0 |
- Qatar entered their first ever final in their Asian Cup history
- Date: 29 January 2019
- Venue: Mohammed bin Zayed Stadium, Abu Dhabi
- Referee: César Arturo Ramos (Mexico)
- Attendance: 38,646

An AFC Asian Cup match between Qatar and the United Arab Emirates occurred on 29 January 2019, as part of the 2019 AFC Asian Cup. It was held at the Mohammed bin Zayed Stadium in the capital of the United Arab Emirates, Abu Dhabi. The match is referred as the Blockade Derby, due to the then-ongoing Qatar diplomatic crisis and deterioration of Qatar–United Arab Emirates relations.

The match has a significant impact on the outcome of the tournament. It was highly criticised in the United Arab Emirates, with the Emirati hosts suffering their most humiliating home defeat in Asian Cup history, while in Qatar, the match was remembered because it helped Qatar reach their first ever Asian Cup final, which they eventually won.

== Background ==
Both Qatar and the United Arab Emirates marked the 2019 edition as the 10th edition they have qualified. While the UAE automatically qualified as hosts, Qatar was the first country to qualify for the tournament, having secured it in November 2015. Being the two earliest teams to qualify, both teams also had unsuccessful attempts to qualify for the 2018 FIFA World Cup, prompting them to replace managers. The Emirates appointing 2011 AFC Asian Cup winner Alberto Zaccheroni, while Qatar hired Félix Sánchez Bas, a former youth coach at FC Barcelona and the architect of Qatar's successful 2014 AFC U-19 Championship conquest.

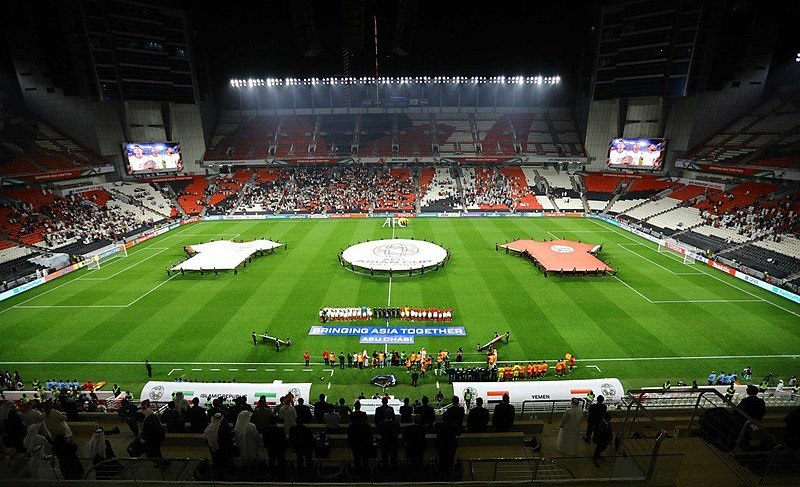
The Mohammed bin Zayed Stadium held the match.

In 2017, the Qatar diplomatic crisis erupted, with the United Arab Emirates, along with Bahrain, Egypt and Saudi Arabia, cut off relations with Qatar in accusation of sponsoring terrorism and its independent diplomacy, blockaded air and space for Qatar and banned Qataris from entering these countries. The rift was emboldened by the 13 demands from the blockade countries, mostly led by the United Arab Emirates, in similar charges. Qatar rejected the demands, and the blockade continued. The tensions later served as a catalyst for the eventual hostilities between two countries, which even extended to football as well. In 2018 AFC U-19 Championship, the captain of U-19 United Arab Emirates team refused to shake hand with the counterpart from Qatar. The United Arab Emirates won 2–1, however the United Arab Emirates would soon crash out of group stage while Qatar would recover to qualify for 2019 FIFA U-20 World Cup.

The buildup of 2019 AFC Asian Cup was also marred with tensions between Qatar and the United Arab Emirates. Qatari organizers and, especially AFC Vice-president Saoud al-Mohannadi, was also barred by the Emirati authorities. Although the Emirati government later announced that it would permit Qatari citizens temporary entry into the country pending approval from Emirati authorities, Qataris were still banned from entering the country throughout the 2019 AFC Asian Cup.

== Pre-match ==
Round of 16
20 January – Hazza bin Zayed
Thailand | 1
China | 2
20 January – Mohammed bin Zayed
Iran | 2
Oman | 0
20 January – Al Maktoum
Jordan | 1 (2)
Vietnam (p) | 1 (4)
21 January – Sharjah
Japan | 1
Saudi Arabia | 0
22 January – Rashid
South Korea (a.e.t.) | 2
Bahrain | 1
22 January – Al Nahyan
Qatar | 1
Iraq | 0
21 January – Zayed Sports City
United Arab Emirates (a.e.t.) | 3
Kyrgyzstan | 2
21 January – Khalifa bin Zayed
Australia (p) | 0 (4)
Uzbekistan | 0 (2)

Quarter-finals
24 January – Mohammed bin Zayed
China | 0
Iran | 3
24 January – Al Maktoum
Vietnam | 0
Japan | 1
25 January – Zayed Sports City
South Korea | 0
Qatar | 1
25 January – Hazza bin Zayed
United Arab Emirates | 1
Australia | 0

Semi-finals
28 January – Hazza bin Zayed
Iran | 0
Japan | 3
29 January – Mohammed bin Zayed
Qatar
United Arab Emirates

Final
1 February – Zayed Sports City
Japan

=== Qatar ===
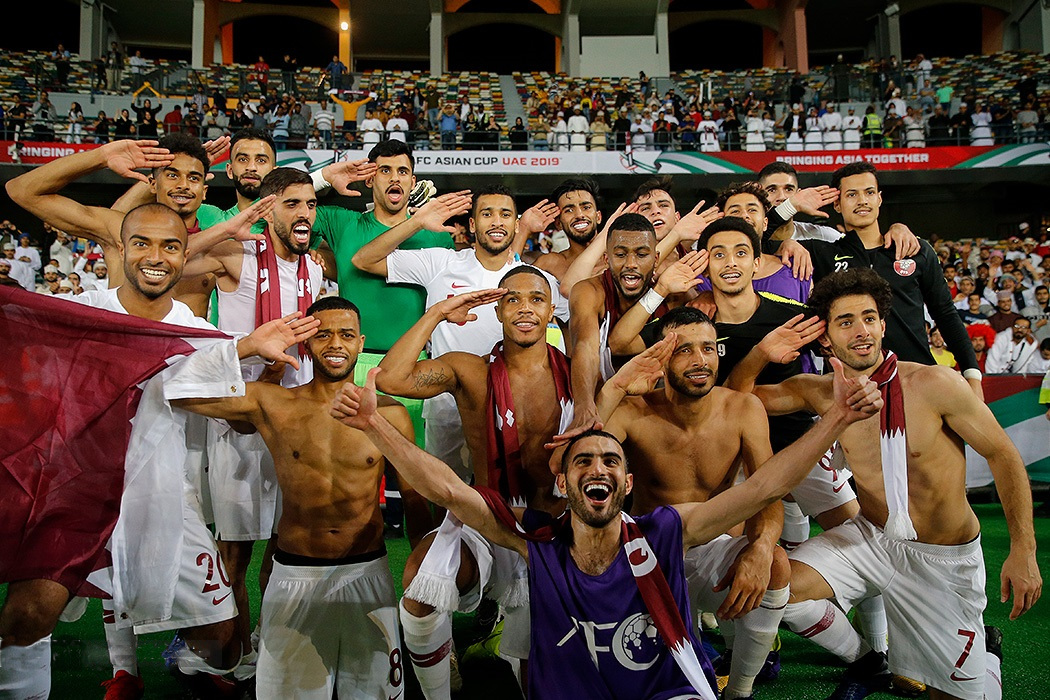
Qatar players celebrate after beating South Korea 1–0 and qualifying for the semi-finals.

Qatar, with majority of the squad was formed from the basis of the team that won the 2014 AFC U-19 Asian Cup, was drawn into group E, together with neighbor and rival Saudi Arabia, and two minnows Lebanon and North Korea. Qatar easily topped their group with a comfortable style, winning all three matches, respectively, 2–0 Lebanon and Saudi Arabia, as well as its biggest ever win in their Asian Cup history, a 6–0 win over North Korea, despite being completely cut off from fans. Qatar then met Iraq in the round of sixteen as Iraqi supporters dominated the stadium, where Iraqi-born Bassam Al-Rawi turned hero as Qatar won its first ever knockout stage game, 1–0.

Qatar then faced the Asian powerhouse South Korea, which had previously eliminated Germany from the 2018 FIFA World Cup and the appearance of star striker Son Heung-min, and created the biggest shock in the tournament, beating the mighty South Koreans 1–0 to reach the semi-finals, without conceding a single goal.

=== United Arab Emirates ===
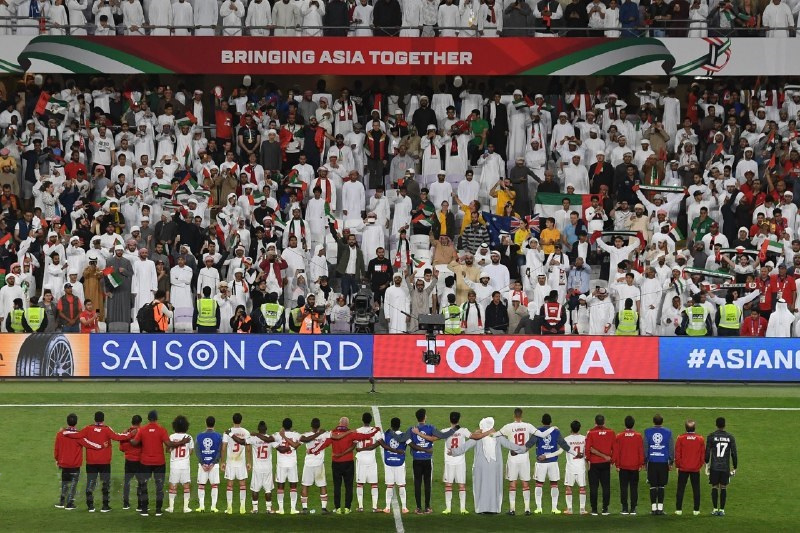
UAE players greet their fans after beating Australia 1–0 and qualifying for the semi-finals.

The United Arab Emirates, as hosts, automatically drawn into the group A, along with Bahrain, India and Thailand. Prior to the tournament, the United Arab Emirates suffered a bad new when playmaker and star Omar Abdulrahman could not take part due to an injury. The United Arab Emirates topped the group, but with an unpromising performance, winning only against India and drew to Bahrain and Thailand. In the round of sixteen, the United Arab Emirates struggled for over 120' to overcome a brave Kyrgyzstan 3–2 with Ahmed Khalil converted a penalty. Then, the United Arab Emirates managed its biggest achievement in the tournament, beating then-Asian champions Australia 1–0 thanked for a mistake by Miloš Degenek, to set-up its semi-final encounter against Qatar.

As Japan had crushed Iran 3–0 in the earlier semi-finals, the winner of the last semi-final game would face Japan for the trophy. The United Arab Emirates also held an edge by historical performance, being undefeated to Qatar since 2002.

=== Match ticket controversy ===
Prior to the semi-finals, Prince Nahyan bin Zayed Al Nahyan decided to buy all the remaining tickets of the match to distribute for home fans, as a way to cheer the spirit of the United Arab Emirates, meaning that Qatar had to face an entirely hostile crowd. This had generated controversy as the United Arab Emirates were attempting to politicize the match, given the earlier crisis in the relations between two countries.

== Match ==
=== Summary ===
==== First half ====
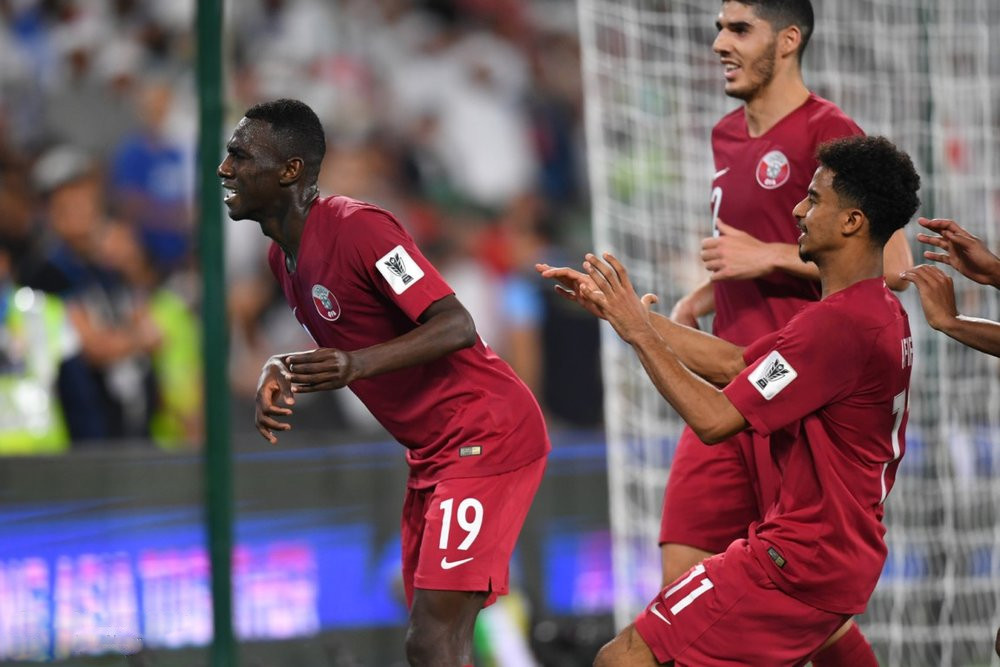
Almoez Ali celebrates after scoring the second goal.

The match started strongly for the United Arab Emirates, as Qatar looked a little nervous at early minutes. However, as usual, first ten minutes saw the Qatari defenders and goalkeeper Saad Al-Sheeb played solidly against the might of Ali Mabkhout, currently the best player of the United Arab Emirates. After the first ten minutes, Qatar regained the note and pressed the United Arab Emirates to defense. Salem Al Hajri had a chance to finish off Khalid Eisa, but was unsuccessful. Pressure mounted on the Emirati defenders in the next ten minutes.

It didn't take long for Qatar to take the lead. At the 22nd minute, Boualem Khoukhi’s angled drive from 18 yards found its way under Khalid Eisa’s dive and into the net, stunning home fans with a 1–0 lead. Undeterred, the UAE responded through an Ismail Al Hammadi header which was saved by Saad Al Sheeb and a similar effort from Ali Mabkhout that fizzed wide of the target shortly before the half-hour mark.

Qatar had a chance in the corner kick provided by Akram Afif, but it was to no avail. Not to wait long, Qatar doubled their lead in the 38th minute. Akram Afif found Almoez Ali who advanced into the area before firing home via a post to equal Ali Daei’s record for the most goals by a player at Asia's premier event, silenced home fans for the second times. At 42', Tarek Salman took down Mabkhout in the penalty area, but the UAE were denied a penalty as Tarek's pressure was not enough. In 45', the UAE missed another free kick opportunity to end the first half with a two-goal deficit.

==== Second half ====
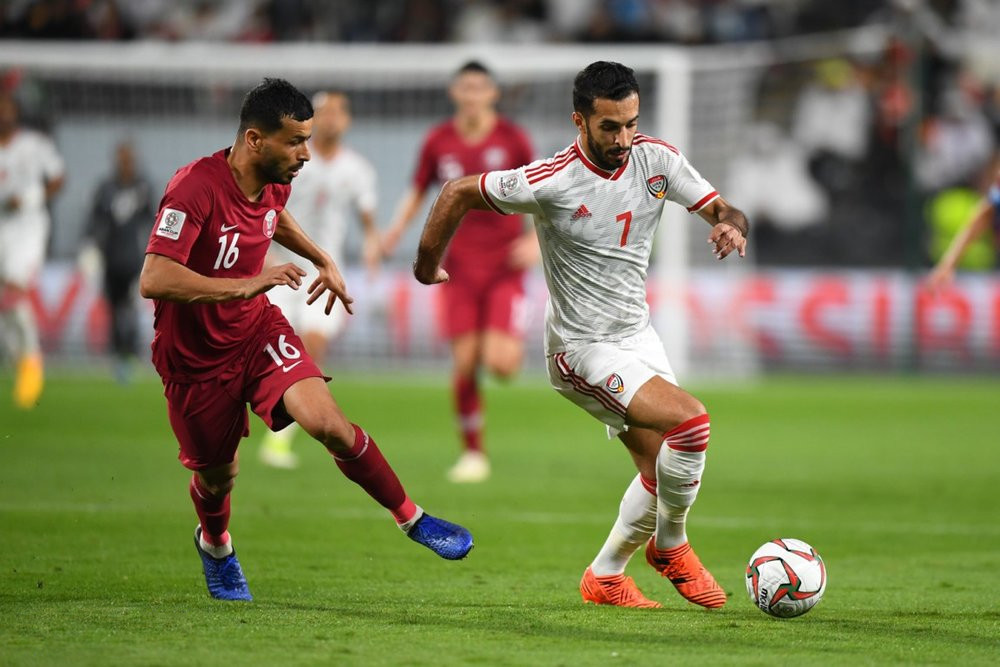
Boualem Khoukhi competes with Ali Mabkhout for the ball.

The second half saw veteran Ismail Matar replacing Amer Abdulrahman. In 52', Al Sheeb denied a clear strike by Mabkhout to maintain the two-goal lead for Qatar. The Qatari defenders, in order to protect the score, caused numerous fouls outside the penalty area and provided significant problems for the Emiratis, resulting in a yellow card for Karim Boudiaf. In 68', Tarek Salman suffered a minor injury. However, he was able to play again later on. Ismail Matar tried to break through two minutes later but was unsuccessful. Mohamed Abdulrahman was substituted in 70' for Saif Rashid to reinvigorate the midfield. In 73', Al Sheeb denied a chance by Ahmed Khalil. Akram Afif later fell into the Emirati penalty area, but the match continued. Qatar scored their third goal in 81' when captain Hassan Al-Haydos maneuvered past Bandar Al-Ahbabi and clipped the ball over Eisa. They then replaced Almoez Ali with Ahmed Alaaeldin.

As the Emiratis' fighting spirits being completely demoralised, Ismail Ahmed was shown a straight red card late on for dangerous play in 90+1'. Substitute Hamid Ismail, who replaced Akram Afif, rounded off Eisa to confirm Qatar's place in the final. After Qatar made their last replacement, with Tameem Al-Muhaza replacing the Portuguese-born Ró-Ró, the referee blew the whistle and Qatari players celebrated their nation's first ever Asian Cup final and victory over the disgruntled Emirati side.

=== Details ===
29 January 2019
18:00

| Qatar | 4–0 | United Arab Emirates |
|---|---|---|
| Khoukhi 22'; Ali 37'; Al-Haydos 80'; Ismail 90+3' | Report |

Mohammed bin Zayed Stadium, Abu Dhabi
Attendance: 38,646
Referee: César Arturo Ramos (Mexico)

| Qatar | United Arab Emirates |

| GK | 1 | Saad Al-Sheeb |
| RB | 2 | Ró-Ró | | (substituted off) 90+4' |
| CB | 16 | Boualem Khoukhi |
| CB | 4 | Tarek Salman |
| LB | 3 | Abdelkarim Hassan |
| CM | 14 | Salem Al-Hajri |
| CM | 23 | Assim Madibo |
| CM | 12 | Karim Boudiaf | (yellow card) 62' |
| RF | 10 | Hassan Al-Haydos (c) |
| CF | 19 | Almoez Ali | | (substituted off) 86' |
| LF | 11 | Akram Afif | | (substituted off) 90+2' |
Substitutions:
| FW | 7 | Ahmed Alaaeldin | (yellow card) 87' | (substituted on) 86' |
| DF | 8 | Hamid Ismail | | (substituted on) 90+2' |
| DF | 13 | Tameem Al-Muhaza | | (substituted on) 90+4' |
Manager:
(Spain) Félix Sánchez

| GK | 17 | Khalid Eisa |
| CB | 19 | Ismail Ahmed | (red card) 90+1' |
| CB | 6 | Fares Juma (c) |
| CB | 3 | Walid Abbas |
| RM | 9 | Bandar Al-Ahbabi |
| CM | 13 | Khamis Esmaeel |
| CM | 2 | Ali Salmeen |
| CM | 5 | Amer Abdulrahman | | (substituted off) 46' |
| LM | 15 | Ismail Al Hammadi | | (substituted off) 51' |
| SS | 20 | Saif Rashid | | (substituted off) 70' |
| CF | 7 | Ali Mabkhout |
Substitutions:
| FW | 10 | Ismail Matar | (yellow card) 55' | (substituted on) 46' |
| FW | 11 | Ahmed Khalil | | (substituted on) 51' |
| MF | 16 | Mohamed Abdulrahman | | (substituted on) 70' |
Manager:
(Italy) Alberto Zaccheroni

Man of the Match:
Boualem Khoukhi (Qatar)

Assistant referees:
Miguel Hernández (Mexico)
Alberto Morín (Mexico)
Fourth official:
Ravshan Irmatov (Uzbekistan)
Video assistant referee:
Paolo Valeri (Italy)
Assistant video assistant referees:
Muhammad Taqi (Singapore)
Chris Beath (Australia)

== Aftermath ==
Round of 16
20 January – Hazza bin Zayed
Thailand | 1
China | 2
20 January – Mohammed bin Zayed
Iran | 2
Oman | 0
20 January – Al Maktoum
Jordan | 1 (2)
Vietnam (p) | 1 (4)
21 January – Sharjah
Japan | 1
Saudi Arabia | 0
22 January – Rashid
South Korea (a.e.t.) | 2
Bahrain | 1
22 January – Al Nahyan
Qatar | 1
Iraq | 0
21 January – Zayed Sports City
United Arab Emirates (a.e.t.) | 3
Kyrgyzstan | 2
21 January – Khalifa bin Zayed
Australia (p) | 0 (4)
Uzbekistan | 0 (2)

Quarter-finals
24 January – Mohammed bin Zayed
China | 0
Iran | 3
24 January – Al Maktoum
Vietnam | 0
Japan | 1
25 January – Zayed Sports City
South Korea | 0
Qatar | 1
25 January – Hazza bin Zayed
United Arab Emirates | 1
Australia | 0

Semi-finals
28 January – Hazza bin Zayed
Iran | 0
Japan | 3
29 January – Mohammed bin Zayed
Qatar | 4
United Arab Emirates | 0

Final
1 February – Zayed Sports City
Japan
Qatar

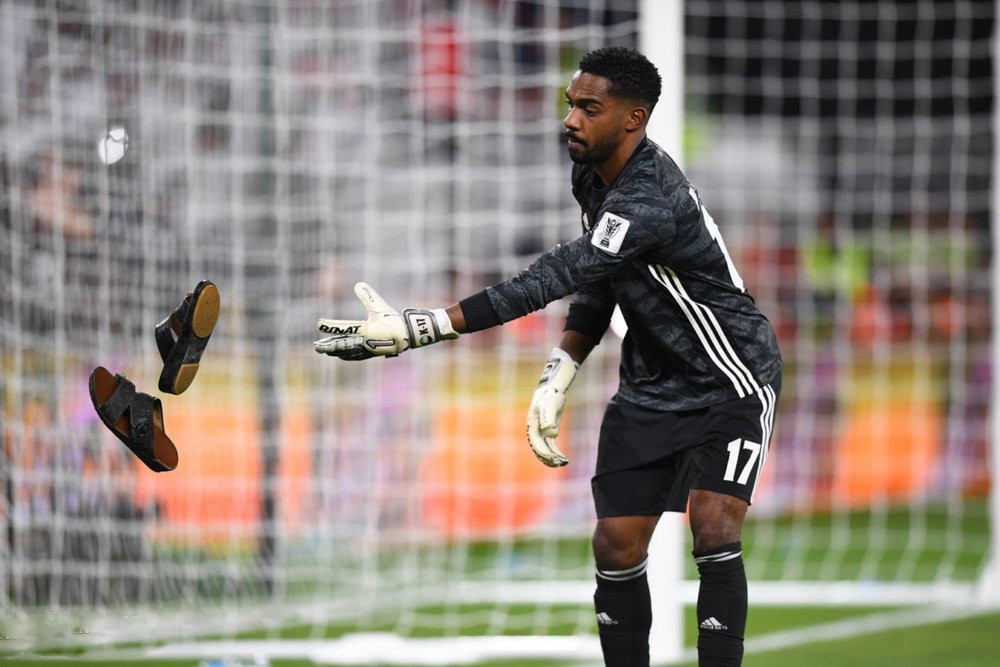
Khalid Eisa removes slippers that were thrown from the stands of Emirati fans.

The match was marred by bottle and footwear-throwing incidents committed by the UAE supporters which occurred throughout of the match and became more intense as Qatar proved to be too strong for the host nation. This conduct was preceded by booing the Qatari national anthem. The two countries have had a hostile relationship and had cut ties due to the ongoing diplomatic crisis. After the match, Emirati fans had reacted with disgust and fury over the unbelievable defeat of the home team, and had tried to break into the stadium for a possible brawl with Qatari squad, but no avail.

The outcome of the match was so humiliating that manager Alberto Zaccheroni had to apologize for the home fans, as his contract also expired following the end of the tournament. The defeat was also the first ever Emirati defeat to Qatar since 2002, ending the country's 17 years undefeated streak over the Gulf rival. Criticism ran against the UAE for its failure to contain fans' hooliganism throughout the match. Moreover, the defeat meant it was the United Arab Emirates' heaviest defeat ever against Qatar in their competitive history before Qatar trounced the Emiratis 5–0 in the 2021 FIFA Arab Cup.

Unaccepting the defeat, the United Arab Emirates Football Association lodged a formal appeal to the AFC over the eligibility of Sudanese-born Almoez Ali and Iraqi-born Bassam Al-Rawi, claiming that they did not qualify to play for Qatar on residency grounds per Article 7 of the Regulations Governing the Application of the FIFA statutes, which states a player is eligible to play for a representative team if he has "lived continuously for at least five years after reaching the age of 18 on the territory of the relevant association". It was alleged that Ali and Al-Rawi had not lived continuously in Qatar for at least five years over the age of 18, although the players claimed that their mothers were born in Qatar.

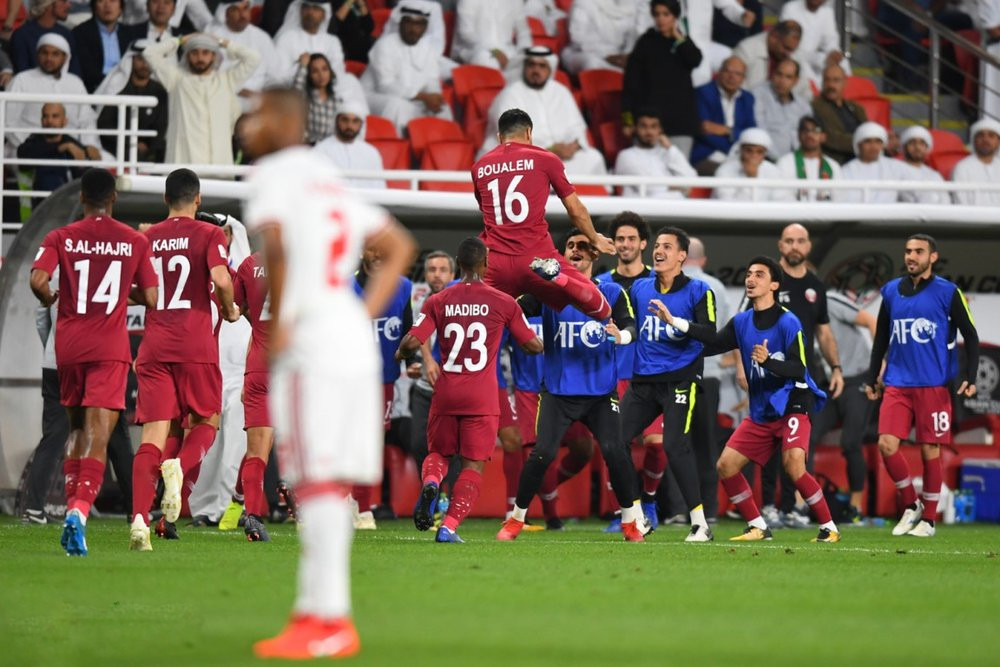
The joy of the Qatari national team players after the end of the match and qualifying for the final match.

Only hours prior to the start of the final on 1 February 2019, the AFC Disciplinary and Ethics Committee announced that it had dismissed the protest lodged by the UAEFA.

For Qatar, the win secured their place in what would be their first-ever Asian Cup final. The win sent many Qataris into jubilant at home, as Qatar was seen as a dark horse rather than a tournament favorite. It was superseded when Qatar managed to outplay Japan in the emphatic 3–1 final victory to take home the country's first ever football honor. Qatar's victorious campaign further deepened the rivalry and tensions, as most Emirati newspapers struggled to provide a report about it.

The United Arab Emirates were fined $150,000 and were originally asked to play two home matches without spectators. The decision was later appealed by the UAEFA. It was believed that the President of the AFC, Salman bin Ibrahim Al Khalifa, had his role behind the reversal of the ban, given his Bahraini nationality and Bahrain's participation in the blockade against Qatar.

== See also ==
- 2019 AFC Asian Cup
- Qatar diplomatic crisis
- Qatar–United Arab Emirates football rivalry
