= Qatar–United Arab Emirates football rivalry =

International football rivalry

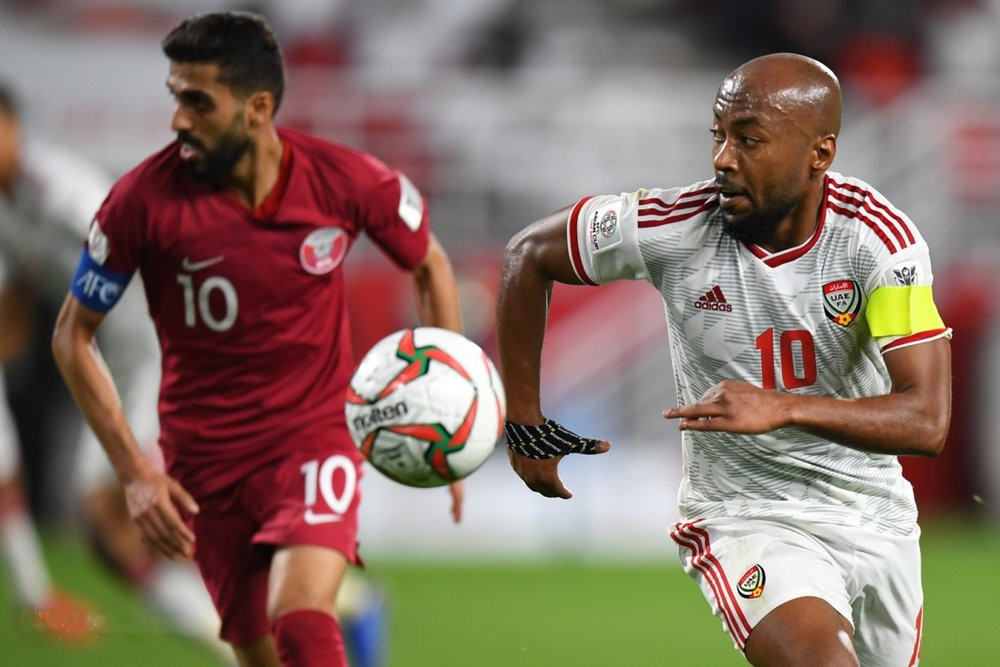
- Qatar's Hassan Al-Haydos (left) and the UAE's Ismail Matar (right) competing in the 2019 AFC Asian Cup semifinals
- Other names: Blockade Derby; Gulf Derby
- Location: AFC; WAFF
- Teams: Qatar; United Arab Emirates
- First meeting: United Arab Emirates 1–0 Qatar; 2nd Arabian Gulf Cup; Riyadh (17 March 1972)
- Latest meeting: United Arab Emirates 1–1 Qatar; 27th Arabian Gulf Cup; Jeddah (30 September 2026)

Statistics
- Total meetings: 38
- Most wins: Qatar (15)
- Top scorer: (United Arab Emirates) Ali Mabkhout (5) (United Arab Emirates) Fábio Lima (5)
- Largest victory: Qatar 5–0 United Arab Emirates; 2021 FIFA Arab Cup; Al Khor (10 December 2021); United Arab Emirates 5–0 Qatar; 2026 FIFA World Cup qualification Abu Dhabi (19 November 2024)

The Qatar–United Arab Emirates football rivalry is an association football rivalry between two nations, Qatar and the United Arab Emirates, which involves the football teams of both nations.

The two nations' rivalry has begun since 1972, however, their rivalry had been largely friendly at first and both Qatar and the United Arab Emirates had no issue facing each other. Beginning in 2017, due to the Qatar diplomatic crisis and the downturn of relations, poor political relations have managed to affect football development, causing the rivalry to gain importance.

== History ==
Qatar and the United Arab Emirates had been largely friendly football rivals when the two first met in 1972, a year after independence from Britain. The two countries first met in the 2nd Arabian Gulf Cup, where Qatar lost to the United Arab Emirates 0–1. Since then, the two nations have met in another 37 occasions. However, only two games happened as friendlies, both ended with Emirati victories.

The rivalry was initially insignificant until 2017 when the United Arab Emirates actively participated in the Qatar diplomatic crisis, by blockading Qatar in air, land and naval travels. Since then, the rivalry has headed into a more hostile fervor; in 2018 AFC U-19 Championship, captain of the U-19 United Arab Emirates refused to shake hand with the Qatari counterpart, Qatar lost the game 1–2 but eventually qualified for the 2019 FIFA U-20 World Cup while the United Arab Emirates was eliminated instead.

Attempt to separate politics from football proved fruitless, when in 2019 AFC Asian Cup, despite effort to reduce tensions, the United Arab Emirates still banned Qataris from entering the country for the tournament. Even Qatari officials were also prohibited from entering the country to inspect the perpetration for the competition. Further, in the semi-finals game between two countries, Prince Nahyan bin Zayed Al Nahyan decided to buy all the remaining tickets of the match to distribute for home fans, as a way to cheer the spirit of the United Arab Emirates, meaning that Qatar had to face an entirely hostile crowd. This had generated controversy as the United Arab Emirates were attempting to politicize the match, given the earlier crisis in the relations between two countries. Despite this, Qatar emerged victoriously with a resounding 4–0 victory on its eventual conquest of the tournament, which was the biggest victory for either of them in their head-to-head history at the time.

When the two nations met in Qatar for the fourth round of the 2026 FIFA World Cup qualification, riots broke out after Qatar scored its second goal as visiting Emirati fans threw plastic bottles and footwear with some fans even invading the pitch; Pedro Miguel even celebrated in front of the frustrated Emiratis further escalating the situation. Security had to interfere to deescalate the whole issue and some Emirati players tried to calm the crowd. As Qatar won the match 2–1 and qualified for the World Cup, the UAE would qualify for the fifth round where they'd eventually lose to Iraq and miss out on the 2026 FIFA World Cup. An Emirati football team official was banned for 16 matches while Qatar's Tarek Salman was given a two match ban for this incident.

== Matches ==
#	Date	Competition	Venue	Home team	Score	Away team
1	17 March 1972	2nd Arabian Gulf Cup	Prince Faisal bin Fahd Stadium, Riyadh	United Arab Emirates	1–0	Qatar
2	29 March 1974	3rd Arabian Gulf Cup	Al Kuwait Sports Club Stadium, Kaifan	United Arab Emirates	1–1	Qatar
3	29 March 1976	4th Arabian Gulf Cup	Khalifa International Stadium, Doha	Qatar	3–1	United Arab Emirates
4	29 March 1979	5th Arabian Gulf Cup	Al-Shaab Stadium, Baghdad	Qatar	1–0	United Arab Emirates
5	17 September 1980	1980 AFC Asian Cup	Sabah Al Salem Stadium, Kuwait City	Qatar	2–1	United Arab Emirates
6	19 March 1982	6th Arabian Gulf Cup	Zayed Sports City Stadium, Abu Dhabi	United Arab Emirates	1–0	Qatar
7	12 March 1984	7th Arabian Gulf Cup	Royal Oman Police Stadium, Muscat	United Arab Emirates	1–0	Qatar
8	7 April 1984	8th Arabian Gulf Cup	Bahrain National Stadium, Manama	Qatar	3–2	United Arab Emirates
9	7 April 1988	9th Arabian Gulf Cup	King Fahd International Stadium, Riyadh	Qatar	2–1	United Arab Emirates
10	7 April 1988	1988 AFC Asian Cup	Suheim bin Hamad Stadium, Doha	Qatar	2–1	United Arab Emirates
11	24 October 1989	1990 FIFA World Cup Qualification	National Stadium, Singapore	Qatar	1–1	United Arab Emirates
12	27 February 1990	10th Arabian Gulf Cup	Al-Sadaqua Walsalam Stadium, Kuwait City	Qatar	0–0	United Arab Emirates
13	14 May 1992	Friendly	Zayed Sports City Stadium, Abu Dhabi	United Arab Emirates	1–0	Qatar
14	6 December 1992	11th Arabian Gulf Cup	Khalifa International Stadium, Doha	Qatar	1–0	United Arab Emirates
15	9 October 1994	1994 Asian Games	Bingo Stadium, Onomichi	United Arab Emirates	2–2	Qatar
16	3 November 1994	12th Arabian Gulf Cup	Zayed Sports City Stadium, Abu Dhabi	United Arab Emirates	2–0	Qatar
17	16 October 1996	13th Arabian Gulf Cup	Sultan Qaboos Sports Complex, Muscat	United Arab Emirates	0–1	Qatar
18	29 September 1998	1998 Arab Nations Cup	Jassim bin Hamad Stadium, Doha	Qatar	2–1	United Arab Emirates
19	5 November 1998	14th Arabian Gulf Cup	Bahrain National Stadium, Manama	Qatar	0–0	United Arab Emirates
20	31 August 2001	2002 FIFA World Cup qualification	Zayed Sports City Stadium, Abu Dhabi	United Arab Emirates	0–2	Qatar
21	4 October 2001	2002 FIFA World Cup qualification	Khalifa International Stadium, Doha	Qatar	1–2	United Arab Emirates
22	20 January 2002	15th Arabian Gulf Cup	King Fahd International Stadium, Riyadh	Qatar	2–0	United Arab Emirates
23	3 January 2004	16th Arabian Gulf Cup	Al-Sadaqua Walsalam Stadium, Kuwait City	Qatar	0–0	United Arab Emirates
24	10 December 2004	17th Arabian Gulf Cup	Khalifa International Stadium, Doha	Qatar	2–2	United Arab Emirates
25	16 July 2007	2007 AFC Asian Cup	Quân khu 7 Stadium, Ho Chi Minh City	Qatar	1–2	United Arab Emirates
26	8 January 2009	19th Arabian Gulf Cup	Royal Oman Police Stadium, Muscat	Qatar	0–0	United Arab Emirates
27	25 August 2011	Friendly	Tahnoun bin Mohammed Stadium, Al Ain	United Arab Emirates	3–1	Qatar
28	25 August 2013	21st Arabian Gulf Cup	Khalifa Sports City Stadium, Isa Town	United Arab Emirates	3–1	Qatar
29	11 January 2015	2015 AFC Asian Cup	Canberra Stadium, Canberra	United Arab Emirates	4–1	Qatar
30	29 January 2019	2019 AFC Asian Cup	Mohammed bin Zayed Stadium, Abu Dhabi	United Arab Emirates	0–4	Qatar
31	2 December 2019	24th Arabian Gulf Cup	Khalifa International Stadium, Doha	Qatar	4–2	United Arab Emirates
32	10 December 2021	2021 FIFA Arab Cup	Al Bayt Stadium, Al Khor	Qatar	5–0	United Arab Emirates
33	13 January 2023	25th Arabian Gulf Cup	Al-Minaa Olympic Stadium, Basra	Qatar	1–1	United Arab Emirates
34	5 September 2024	2026 FIFA World Cup qualification	Ahmad bin Ali Stadium, Al Rayyan	Qatar	1–3	United Arab Emirates
35	19 November 2024	2026 FIFA World Cup qualification	Al Nahyan Stadium, Abu Dhabi	United Arab Emirates	5–0	Qatar
36	21 December 2024	26th Arabian Gulf Cup	Sulaibikhat Stadium, Sulaibikhat	United Arab Emirates	1–1	Qatar
37	14 October 2025	2026 FIFA World Cup qualification	Jassim bin Hamad Stadium, Al Rayyan	Qatar	2–1	United Arab Emirates
38	30 September 2026	27th Arabian Gulf Cup	King Abdullah Sports City Stadium, Jeddah	United Arab Emirates	1–1	Qatar

== Overall summary ==
As of 30 September 2026

Team	Pld	W	D	L	GF	GA	GD	Best win
United Arab Emirates	38	12	11	15	52	51	+1	5–0
Qatar	38	15	11	12	51	52	–1	5–0

Matches held in United Arab Emirates	7
Matches held in neutral venue	24
Matches held in Qatar	7
Total matches	38

== Top scorers ==
The bold indicates that the player is still active

Rank	Player	Goals
1	(United Arab Emirates) Ali Mabkhout	5
1	(United Arab Emirates) **Fabio Lima**	5
3	(United Arab Emirates) Ahmed Khalil	4
3	(Qatar) **Almoez Ali**	4
3	(Qatar) **Boualem Khoukhi**	4
6	(United Arab Emirates) Adnan Al Talyani	3
6	(Qatar) Mohammed Al-Enazi	3
8	(United Arab Emirates) Yahya Al-Ghassani	2
8	(Qatar) Hassan Al-Haydos	2
8	(United Arab Emirates) Zuhair Bakheet	2
8	(United Arab Emirates) **Ali Saleh**	2

== See also ==
- Qatar–United Arab Emirates relations
- Qatar diplomatic crisis
