= Zeina Jallad =

Zeina Jallad is a Palestinian human-rights lawyer and scholar who was appointed as UN Special Rapporteur on the negative impact of unilateral coercive measures in May 2026.

== Studies ==
She studied at the American University of Beirut and at Columbia Law School, has been a fellow at Harvard Law School, Columbia Law School, and NYU School of Law, and has a position on the Board of Trustees of Birzeit University.

== Selection as UN special rapporteur ==
She has held the post of Senior Legal Advisor to the United Nations Special Rapporteur on the Right to Food, and on 1 May 2026 she was appointed special rapporteur "on the negative impact of unilateral coercive measures." She was allegedly selected by UNHRC’s Office of the President despite being second choice of a UNHRC consultative group, which recommended Clara Portela, an academic from Spain, as their preferred candidate.

== See also ==
- List of UN Special Rapporteurs
