= List of wars involving Qatar =

This is a list of wars involving the State of Qatar.

== List ==
Conflict	Qatar and allies	Opponents	Result
Saudi invasion of Qatar (1793–1798)	Qatar; Bahrain; Oman; Ottoman Empire	First Saudi State	Defeat: Incorporation of Qatar into First Saudi State
Battle of Khakeekera (1811)	Bahrain; Sheikhdom of Kuwait	Diriyah	Bahraini victory
Qatari War of Independence (1867–1868)	Qatar	Bahrain (Emirate of Abu Dhabi) Abu Dhabi (1867)	Ceasefire: British intervention and signing of the Anglo-Bahraini Treaty of 1868; British recognition of Al-Thani in Qatar; Independence of Qatar from Bahrain
Qatari–Abu Dhabi War (1881–1893)	Qatar; Supported by: Ottoman Empire	Abu Dhabi; Supported by: United Kingdom	Inconclusive: No territorial changes; British-mediated peace agreement in 1893
Battle of Al Wajbah (1893)	Qatar	Ottoman Empire	Qatari victory: Relinquishment of Qatari captives; Eventual independence of Qatar from the Ottoman Empire
Gulf War (1990–1991)	Kuwait; United States; United Kingdom; Saudi Arabia; France; Canada; Egypt; Syria; Oman; United Arab Emirates; Qatar; Other Allies	Iraq	Victory: Iraqi withdrawal from Kuwait; Emir Jaber Al-Ahmad Al-Jaber Al-Sabah restored; Heavy casualties and destruction of Iraqi and Kuwaiti infrastructure
Libyan Civil War (2011)	(Libya) NTC; Qatar; NATO: France; United Kingdom; United States; Belgium; Canada; Denmark; Netherlands; Norway; Spain; Turkey; Jordan; Sweden; United Arab Emirates	Libya	Victory: Muammar Gaddafi was killed; The NTC assumed interim control of Libya; 102 countries, UN, EU, AL and AU diplomatically recognised the National Transitional Council as the sole governing authority for Libya
Intervention against ISIL (2014–present)	Iraq; Iraqi Kurdistan; Free Syrian Army; Syrian Kurdistan; United States; United Kingdom; Jordan; Turkey; Morocco; Australia; Belgium; Canada; Denmark; France; Bahrain; Qatar; Saudi Arabia; United Arab Emirates	Islamic State Al-Qaeda: al-Nusra Front; Khorasan; Ahrar ash-Sham	Ongoing: Unilateral US-Arab intervention against Syrian Islamists
Intervention in Yemen (2015–2017)	(Yemen) Hadi government Saudi Arabia; United Arab Emirates; Bahrain; South Korea; Kuwait; Qatar; Jordan; Morocco; Sudan; Egypt; Senegal	(Yemen) Houthi government: Houthis; (Yemen) Saleh loyalists (until 2017)	Withdrawal: Qatar expelled from the coalition due to the 2017 Qatar diplomatic crisis
Direct Involvement in the Middle Eastern Crisis (2025-present): Operation Glad tidings of Victory; Airstrikes on Doha; 2026 Iranian strikes on Qatar	See Belligerents of the Middle Eastern Crisis (2023-present)		Operation Glad tidings of Victory : Diplomatic response; Qatar strongly condemned Iran's violation of its sovereignty and airspace.; Israeli attack on Doha : Diplomatic response; Qatar described the attack as a violation of international law and sovereignty.; 2026 Iran War: Ongoing
