= National anthem of Qatar (1954–1996) =

Former national anthem of Qatar

النشيد الوطني القطري
English: National Anthem of Qatar
- Former national anthem of Qatar
- Music: Unknown
- Adopted: 1954
- Relinquished: 7 December 1996
- Succeeded by: "As-Salam al-Amiri"

Audio sample
- 1988 performance: file; help

Qatar formerly used a different national anthem from 1954 to 1996, when it was replaced by the current anthem "As-Salam al-Amiri". Written like other typical Arab fanfare anthems, this national anthem is possibly one of, if not the shortest national anthem (in terms of music) to ever exist, with only 11 measures. It also had no lyrics. Its composition is possibly of Indian origin.
