= Alena Douhan =

Belarusian law professor

- Алена Доўгань
- Citizenship: Belarus
- Education: Belarusian State University (PhD, Dr. habil.)
- Known for: United Nations Special Rapporteur on the negative impact of unilateral coercive measures

Alena Douhan (Belarusian: Алена Доўгань) is a Belarusian legal scholar. She was appointed United Nations Special Rapporteur on the negative impact of the unilateral coercive measures on the enjoyment of human rights on 25 March 2020. When appointed, she was a professor of International Law and the Director of the Peace Research Center at the Belarusian State University. Douhan's position on economic sanctions was criticised by Aaron Fellmeth, professor of law at Arizona State University.

== Early life and education ==
Douhan earned a PhD at the Belarusian State University in 2005 and a Dr. habil. in International Law and European Law in 2015.

== Career ==
=== UN Special Rapporteur ===
According to the National Review, the role of Special Rapporteur was created by a 2014 resolution at the UN Human Rights Council introduced by Iran on behalf of the non-aligned movement, and Douhan is the second to occupy the role. The role is unpaid and its holder is not a member of the UN staff. Germany, France the United Kingdom and the United States voted against the resolution to create her role while Russia, China, Venezuela and Saudi Arabia voted for the resolution.

According to NGO UN Watch, Douhan in 2021 received a $200,000 contribution from the Chinese government, $150,000 from Russia, and $25,000 from Qatar. UN Watch later said that between 2020 and 2024, she received over $900,000 from China and over $250,000 from Russia.

==== China ====
In May 2024, following a visit to China, Douhan called for the suspension of "all unilateral sanctions applied to China, Chinese nationals and companies without authorization of the U.N. Security Council", including import restrictions under the US Uyghur Forced Labor Prevention Act. In an interview with Politico on how her visit's findings differed from the 2022 UN Human Rights Office report on Xinjiang., Douhan said she "absolutely [did] not want to get into any conflict" with the U.N. Office report. She added that for her own mandate, she could not identify "valid grounds" for U.S. sanctions related to Xinjiang.

==== Israel ====
In June 2020, Douhan joined 46 other UNHRC experts in condemning the Israeli settlements and proposed annexation of the West Bank as a violation of human rights as well as international law. In April 2024, she issued a joint statement with UN expert Attiya Waris opposing a threat made by Israel's finance minister Bezalel Smotrich to cancel an annual protection waiver protecting Israeli banks from terrorism-related lawsuits involving collaboration with West Bank financial companies. The two experts said restricting Palestinian banks "from the global banking system unilaterally also violates the principle of sovereign equality of states" as well as "the principle of non-intervention into the domestic affairs of states", noting further that it would "exacerbate the ongoing humanitarian catastrophe" for everyone in Palestine.

==== Iran ====
Douhan visited Iran in May 2022 to assess the impact of U.S. sanctions on the human rights situation in the country. Iranian activists living outside the country were concerned that Iran would restrict the organizations and individuals she would be allowed to meet. Following her 12-day visit, she concluded that the sanctions contributed to poverty along with a shortage of basic necessities in the country and further called on "sanctioning states, in particular the United States, to lift all unilateral measures imposed against Iran, Iranian nationals and companies without authorization of the UN Security Council."

==== Qatar ====
Douhan was in Qatar for twelve days in November 2020 to assess the impact of sanctions imposed by neighboring countries. She was due to report at the 48th session of the UN Human Rights Council, to be held in September 2021. In a preliminary statement, she urged the lifting of sanctions.

==== Syria ====
In December 2020, Douhan asked the U.S. to lift its sanctions against Syria, saying they "may inhibit rebuilding of Syria’s civilian infrastructure” destroyed by the conflict, and may “violate the human rights of the Syrian people”. Her comments were welcomed by the Syrian government, and rejected by the U.S. Special Envoy for Syria. In November 2022, Douhan visited Syria and again called on the U.S., the European Union and some Arab states to lift their sanctions, which, she said, were having a large negative effect "across all walks of life in the country" and were "leading to shortages in medicines and medical equipment that affect the lives of ordinary Syrians".

==== Venezuela ====
Douhan was due to visit Venezuela in August 2020 to investigate the impact of international sanctions. Before her visit, 66 Venezuelan NGOs (including PROVEA) asked Douhan in an open letter to consider the harmful impact of sanctions in the context of years of repression, corruption and economic mismanagement that predate the sanctions, and requested she meet independent press and civil society researchers.

She arrived on 31 January, and was welcomed on arrival by a government minister and the Venezuelan ambassador to the UN. She declared in her preliminary findings as she left on 12 February: that sanctions against Venezuela have had a negative impact on both the economy and the population. In her report, Douhan said that sanctions against Venezuela had worsened the economic and humanitarian crisis in the country, but that Venezuela's economic decline "began in 2014 with the fall in oil prices" and that "mismanagement and corruption had also contributed". The Venezuelan government welcomed the report, while the opposition accused her of "playing into the hands of the regime" of Nicolás Maduro. Douhan was harshly criticized by Venezuelan civil society,, and several non-governmental organizations led a social media campaign using the hashtag "#Lacrisisfueprimero" (The crisis came first).

== Publications ==
- Douhan, A. F. (2017) The Ukrainian Crisis: Wrong Responses of the International Community? in Czapliński, Władysław (2017). The case of Crimea's annexation under international law. Warsaw: SCHOLAR Publishing House. ISBN 978-83-7383-901-4. OCLC 1023629066.
- Douhan, A. F. (2018). Fundamental human rights and coercive measures: impact and interdependence. Journal of the Belarusian State University. International Relations, 1, 67–77. Retrieved from https://journals.bsu.by/index.php/internationalRelations/article/view/1307
- Douhan, Alena F. (2020) "CHANGING NATURE OF AN INDIVIDUAL IN INTERNATIONAL LAW." Kutafin University Law Review, vol. 5, no. 2, 2018, p. 290+. Accessed 10 June 2020.
