= Qatar diplomatic crisis =

Diplomatic crisis between several Arab countries and Qatar from 2017 to 2021

Qatar diplomatic crisis الأزمة الدبلوماسية مع قطر
- Part of the Qatar–Saudi Arabia diplomatic conflict, and the Iran–Saudi Arabia proxy conflict
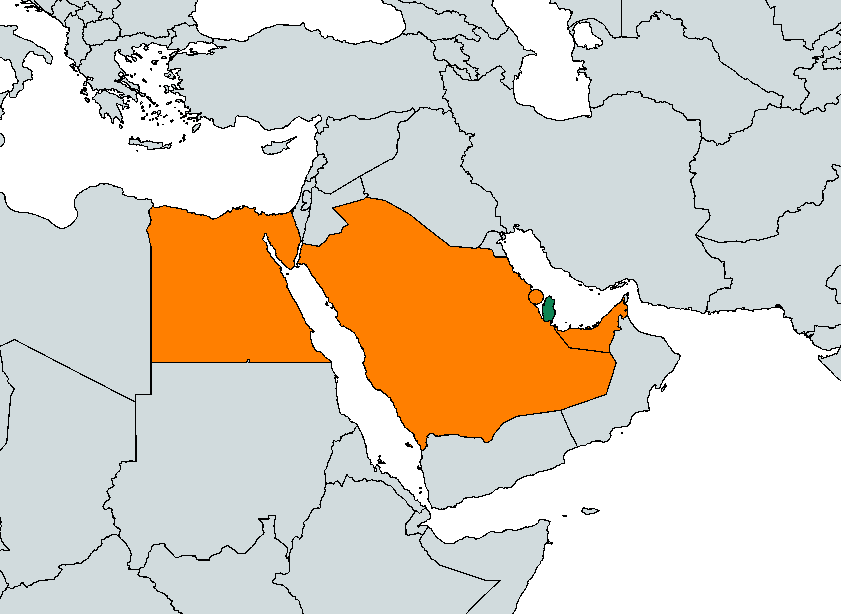
- Saudi Arabia, United Arab Emirates, Bahrain, and Egypt (Orange), the blocking countries, and Qatar (Green)
Date	5 June 2017 – 5 January 2021
Location	Arab League
Result	Restoration of diplomacy

Parties involved in the dispute
Saudi Arabia; United Arab Emirates; Bahrain; Egypt; Maldives; Mauritania; Djibouti; Comoros; Niger; Gabon; Others: Libya (Tobruk)^{[a]}; Senegal (until 2017); Chad (until 2018); Jordan (until 2019)	Qatar; Supported by: Turkey; Iran; Others: Libya (Tripoli); Muslim Brotherhood (alleged)
- ^{a} The Tobruk-based government lost international recognition after the formation of the Government of National Accord in January 2016. The Tobruk-based government claimed to have cut ties with Qatar, despite not having diplomatic representation in the country.

The Qatar diplomatic crisis was a period of diplomatic hostility between Qatar and four Arab states between 2017 and 2021. It began when Saudi Arabia, the United Arab Emirates, Bahrain, and Egypt simultaneously severed their bilateral relations with Qatar and subsequently banned Qatar-registered aircraft and Qatari ships from traversing their territory on land, sea, and air. This involved Saudi Arabia's closure of Qatar's only land crossing, initiating a de facto blockade of the country. The crisis was brought to an end in January 2021, following an agreement between the Saudis and the Qataris.

The Saudi-led coalition cited Qatar's alleged support for terrorism as the main reason for their actions, alleging that Qatar had violated a 2014 agreement with the members of the Gulf Cooperation Council (GCC), of which Qatar is a member. Saudi Arabia and other countries have criticized Al Jazeera and Qatar's relations with Iran. Qatar explained that it had provided assistance to some opposition groups, including Islamist groups (such as the Muslim Brotherhood), but consistently denied aiding militant groups linked to al-Qaeda or the Islamic State of Iraq and the Levant (ISIL). Qatar also emphasized that it had long assisted the United States in the war on terror, especially via the Qatar-based Al Udeid US military base, and through the ongoing military intervention against ISIL.

One day into the crisis, the Saudi-led coalition was joined by Jordan, and was further supported thereafter by the Maldives, Mauritania, Senegal, Djibouti, the Comoros, and the Tobruk-based government in Libya, all of which severed relations with Qatar. The demands against Qatar included reducing diplomatic relations with Iran, stopping military coordination with Turkey, and closing Al Jazeera; Qatar refused to agree to any of the Saudi-led coalition's demands. Initial supply disruptions were minimised by additional imports from Iran, with which Qatar restored full diplomatic relations in August 2017, and Turkey.

On 4 January 2021, Qatar and Saudi Arabia agreed to a resolution of the crisis, brokered by Kuwait and the United States, which stated that Saudi Arabia would reopen its border with Qatar and begin the process of reconciliation. An agreement and final communiqué signed on 5 January 2021 following a GCC summit at al-Ula marked the resolution of the crisis. According to Middle East analyst Samuel Ramani in an article published in Foreign Policy, the crisis was a failure for Saudi Arabia, the UAE, Bahrain, and Egypt, because Qatar ended up forging closer ties with Iran and Turkey, and became economically and militarily stronger and more autonomous.

== Background ==
After taking power as emir of Qatar in 1995, Hamad bin Khalifa al-Thani believed Qatar could find security by transforming itself from a Saudi satellite state into a fully sovereign state, on an equal standing with Saudi Arabia. This included maintaining diplomatic relations with a range of actors, such as Iran, and supporting political movements like the Muslim Brotherhood, which placed it at odds with several neighboring states. Saudi Arabia withdrew its ambassador to Doha from 2002 to 2008 to try to pressure Qatar to change its policies. This approach broadly failed. Since both states were allies of the United States, they tried to avoid direct conflict with one another.

Tension escalated during and after the Arab spring, as both Saudi Arabia and Qatar sought to fill the power vacuum left in the wake of the spring, with Qatar being supportive of the revolutionary wave and Saudi Arabia and even the United Arab Emirates opposing it. These differences have been described as reflecting broader disagreements over regional governance, political Islam, and security priorities.

In March 2014, Saudi Arabia, the United Arab Emirates, Bahrain and Egypt withdrew their ambassadors from Qatar. This severing of relations was the first of its kind since the establishment of the Gulf Cooperation Council (GCC). The crisis affected the GCC negatively at first – raising questions among member states, revealing shifts in their political agendas, and changing the balance of power in the region to some extent.

=== Hostage negotiations ===
In April 2017, Qatar was involved in a deal with both Sunni and Shi'ite militants in Iraq and Syria. The deal had two primary objectives. The immediate goal was to secure the return of 26 Qatari hostages (including Qatari royals) who had been kidnapped by Shi'ite militants while on a falconry expedition in southern Iraq, and kept in captivity for more than 16 months. The second goal was to get both Sunni and Shi'ite militants in Syria to facilitate the passage of humanitarian aid and allow the safe evacuation of civilians. According to The New York Times, this deal allowed the evacuation of at least 2,000 civilians from the Syrian village of Madaya alone. Saudi Arabia and the UAE were specifically outraged by the amount of money Qatar paid to secure the deal. According to the Financial Times, Qatar paid $700 million to multiple Iranian-backed Shi'ite militias in Iraq, $120–140 million to Tahrir al-Sham, and $80 million to Ahrar al-Sham.

=== Riyadh Summit 2017 ===
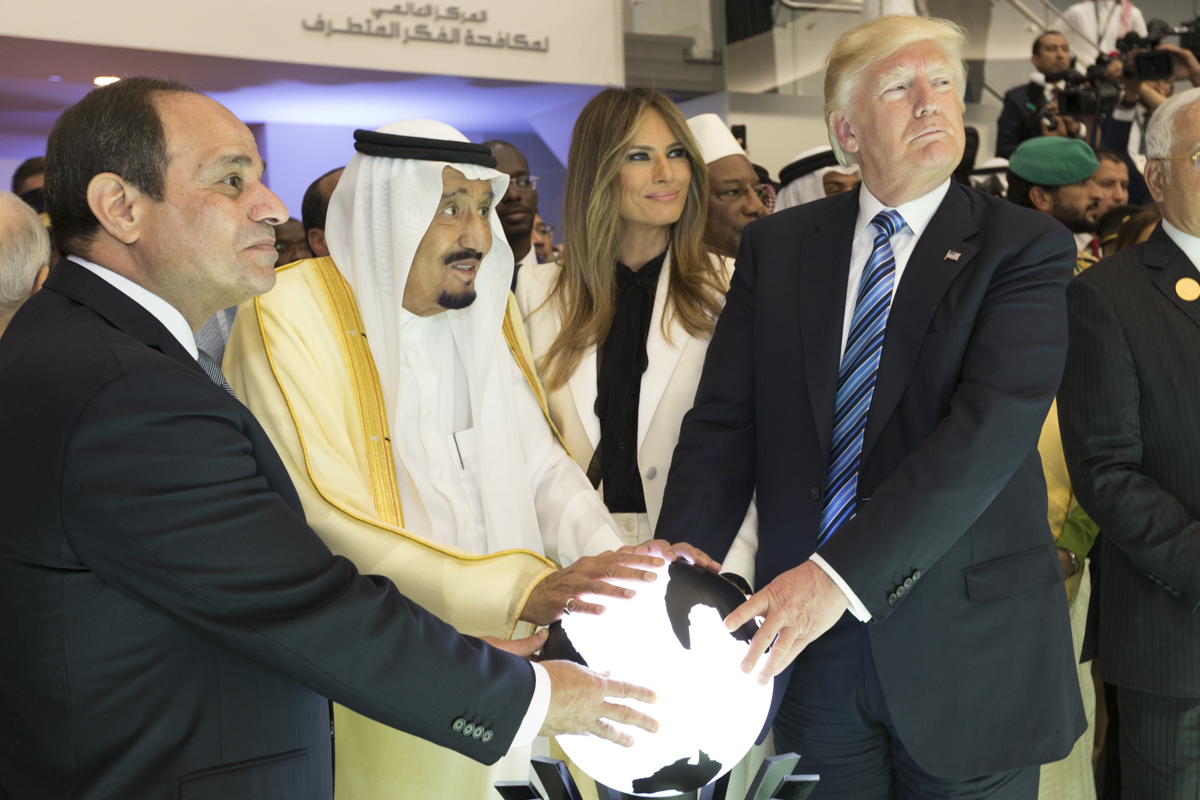
US President Donald Trump, King Salman of Saudi Arabia, and Egyptian President Abdel Fattah el-Sisi at the 2017 Riyadh Summit. The meeting is cited as one of the catalysts for the crisis.

As part of the Riyadh Summit in late May 2017, many world leaders, including then-US President Donald Trump, visited the region. Trump gave strong support for Saudi Arabia's efforts in combating states and groups allied with Iran and the Muslim Brotherhood, leading to an arms deal between the countries. Business Insider reported that "Elliott Broidy, a top fundraiser for President Donald Trump, and George Nader, Broidy's business partner ... pushed for anti-Qatar policies at the highest levels of government, and expected large consulting contracts from Saudi Arabia and the UAE." Trump's support may have prompted other Sunni states to fall in line with Saudi Arabia and stand against Qatar. Trump's public support for Saudi Arabia, according to The New York Times, emboldened the kingdom and sent a chill through other Gulf states, including Oman and Kuwait, which might have feared that any country that defies the Saudis or the United Arab Emirates could face ostracism as Qatar did. The Saudi-led move was at once an opportunity for the GCC partners and Egypt to punish their adversaries in Doha, to please their allies in Washington, and to divert attention from their own shortcomings and challenges.

=== Hacking operations against Qatar ===
According to Qatar-based Al Jazeera and the American FBI, the Qatar News Agency website and other government media platforms were hacked in May 2017, resulting in postings on the official Qatar News Agency website containing faked remarks attributed to the Emir of Qatar, Sheikh Tamim bin Hamad Al Thani, expressing support for Iran, Hamas, Hezbollah, and Israel. The emir was quoted as saying: "Iran represents a regional and Islamic power that cannot be ignored and it is unwise to face up against it. It is a big power in the stabilization of the region." Qatar reported that the statements were false, and officials stated that they did not know their origin. Despite this, the remarks were widely publicized on non-Qatari Arab news media, including UAE-based Sky News Arabia and Saudi-owned Al Arabiya. On 3 June 2017, the Twitter account of Bahraini foreign minister Khalid bin Ahmed Al Khalifa was hacked.

Initially, alleged intelligence gathered by US security agencies indicated that Russian hackers were behind the intrusion first reported by the Qataris. However, a US official briefed on the inquiry told The New York Times that it "was unclear whether the hackers were state-sponsored", and The Guardian diplomatic editor Patrick Wintour reported that "it is believed that the Russian government was not involved in the hacks; instead, freelance hackers were paid to undertake the work on behalf of some other state or individual." A US diplomat said that Russia and its ally Iran stood to benefit from sowing discord among US allies in the region, "particularly if they made it more difficult for the United States to use Qatar as a major base." The FBI sent a team of investigators to Doha to help the Qatari government investigate the hacking incident. The New York Times later reported that the hacking incidents may have been part of a long-running cyberwar between Qatar and other Gulf countries, that was only revealed to the public during the recent incidents. They noted how Saudi and UAE media picked up the statement made by the hacked media in less than 20 minutes, and began interviewing many well-prepared commentators who are opposed to Qatar.

According to a Washington Post report published on 16 July, US intelligence agencies believed that the hacking was done by the United Arab Emirates. The intelligence officials stated that the hacking was discussed among Emirati officials on 23 May, one day before the operation took place. The UAE denied any involvement. On 26 August 2017, it was announced that five individuals allegedly involved in the hacking were arrested in Turkey.

A former employee of the US National Security Agency (NSA), David Evenden, was hired by the UAE to work at the cyberespionage firm CyberPoint. The Emirates signaled a green flag to Evenden and his team to run hacking operations against Qatar, in order to scavenge substance that Qatar has been involved in funding the Muslim Brotherhood at some point in time. In its major stratagem against Qatar, the UAE allowed Evenden and the network of other former NSA employees to neglect rationalizations and fetch confidential data. This team at CyberPoint carried out several global hacking attempts, including against Qatari royals, officials at FIFA, and even internet critics of the UAE. In 2015, the Emirates, using these former NSA employees, hacked emails between Michelle Obama and Moza bint Nasser, mother of Emir Tamim bin Hamad Al Thani. Mrs. Obama was scheduled visit an event in Qatar as a guest of bint Nasser. The email hack provided the UAE with every piece of information exchanged between the two women and their staff.

=== Hacking of UAE ambassador's email ===
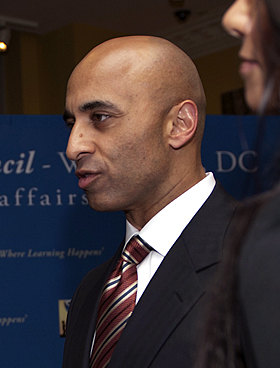
Yousef Al-Otaiba

In May 2017, the email account of the UAE ambassador to the US, Yousef Al-Otaiba, was hacked. The emails were seen by the Huffington Post as an attempt "to embarrass" Al Otaiba because they showed links between the UAE and the US-based pro-Israel Foundation for Defense of Democracies. The hack was seen as a move benefitting Qatar, which further deepened the rift between the two sides. The Intercept reported that Yousef al-Otaiba had been linked to buying influence for UAE-led campaigns in the White House.

== Severance of diplomatic and economic ties ==
Between 5 and 6 June 2017, Saudi Arabia, the UAE, Yemen, Egypt, the Maldives, and Bahrain all separately announced that they were cutting diplomatic ties with Qatar. Among these, Bahrain was the first to announce the severing of ties, at 02:50 GMT in the early morning of 5 June.

A variety of diplomatic actions were taken. Saudi Arabia and the UAE notified ports and shipping agents not to receive Qatari vessels, or ships owned by Qatari companies or individuals. Saudi Arabia closed its land border with Qatar, and closed its airspace to Qatar Airways. Qatar was forced to reroute flights to Africa and Europe through Iranian airspace. Saudi Arabia's central bank advised banks not to trade with Qatari banks in Qatari riyals. Additionally, Qatari citizens in the participating countries were required to leave within two weeks. All GCC countries involved in the announcement ordered their citizens out of Qatar. The foreign ministries of Bahrain and Egypt gave Qatari diplomats 48 hours to leave. Qatar was expelled from the Saudi Arabian-led intervention in Yemen, and Yemen's government itself cut ties. Kuwait and Oman remained neutral.

The Foreign Ministry of Qatar criticized the steps, arguing that they were meant to undermine Qatar's sovereignty. The foreign minister of Qatar, Mohammed bin Abdulrahman Al-Thani, said that Saudi statements regarding Qatar were contradictory, as they blamed Qatar of supporting both the Shi'ite regime in Iran and various extremist Sunni groups.

The Tobruk-based government of Libya claimed to have cut diplomatic ties with Qatar despite having had no actual diplomatic relations with that country. The semi-autonomous Somali regions of Puntland, Hirshabelle, and Galmudug each issued statements cutting ties with Qatar, in opposition to the neutral stance of the federal government of Somalia. Other countries made statements condemning Qatar, including Gabon and Eritrea.

== Demands on Qatar and responses ==
On 22 June 2017, Saudi Arabia, the United Arab Emirates (UAE), Egypt, and Bahrain issued Qatar a list of 13 demands through Kuwaiti mediation, requiring Qatar to agree within 10 days (2 July 2017). According to reports on 23 June, the demands included:

- Closing Al Jazeera and its affiliate stations.
- Closing other news outlets that Qatar funds, directly and indirectly, including Arabi21, Rassd, Al-Araby Al-Jadeed and Middle East Eye.
- Closing the Turkish military base in Qatar, and terminating the Turkish military presence and any joint military cooperation with Turkey inside Qatar.
- Reducing diplomatic relations with Iran. Only trade and commerce with Iran that complies with US and international sanctions were to be permitted.
- Expelling any members of the Islamic Revolutionary Guard Corps (IRGC) and cutting off military and intelligence cooperation with Iran.
- "Severing ties with terrorist, ideological and sectarian organizations including the Muslim Brotherhood, Hamas, the Islamic State of Iraq and the Levant (ISIL), Al-Qaeda, Hezbollah, and Jabhat Fateh al Sham, formerly al Qaeda's branch in Syria", according to one Arab official, who insisted Qatar must announce its compliance.
- Surrendering all designated terrorists in Qatar, and stopping all means of funding for individuals, groups or organisations that have been designated as terrorists.
- Ending interference in the four countries' domestic and foreign affairs and having contact with their political oppositions.
- Stopping granting citizenship to wanted nationals from Saudi Arabia, the United Arab Emirates, Egypt and Bahrain.
- Revoking Qatari citizenship for existing nationals where such citizenship violates those countries' laws.
- Paying reparations for years of alleged wrongs.
- Submitting to monitoring for 10 years.
- Aligning itself with the other Gulf and Arab countries militarily, politically, socially and economically, as well as on economic matters, in line with an agreement reached with Saudi Arabia in 2014.

According to a report by the Qatar-endowed Al Jazeera, "Qatari officials immediately dismissed the document as neither reasonable [nor] actionable." Iran denounced the blockade. US Secretary of State Rex Tillerson said that some of the demands would be very hard to meet but encouraged further dialogue.

On 3 July, Saudi Arabia accepted a Kuwaiti request for the deadline to be extended by 48 hours.

On 5 July, foreign ministers from Egypt, Saudi Arabia, United Arab Emirates and Bahrain met in Cairo after receiving a response from Qatar to their list of demands. The meeting, intended to resolve the dispute, ended in a stalemate when Saudi foreign minister Adel al-Jubeir said that the political and economic boycott of Qatar would remain until it changed its policies. Also on the same day, the Saudi-led bloc withdrew its insistence on compliance with the 13 specific demands of the previous month, instead asking Qatar to accept six broad principles, which included commitments to combat terrorism and extremism and to end acts of provocation and incitement.

However, by 30 July 2017, the 13 demands had been reinstated. In the meantime, a joint statement was made in Cairo in order to restart the negotiation process with Qatar, which included six principles:

- Commitment to combat extremism and terrorism in all its forms and to prevent their financing or the provision of safe havens.
- Prohibiting all acts of incitement and all forms of expression which spread, incite, promote or justify hatred and violence.
- Full commitment to the Riyadh Agreement 2013 and the supplementary agreement and its executive mechanism for 2014 within the framework of the Gulf Cooperation Council (GCC) for Arab States.
- Commitment to all the outcomes of the Arab-Islamic-US Summit held in Riyadh in May 2017.
- To refrain from interfering in the internal affairs of States and from supporting illegal entities.
- The responsibility of all States of the international community to confront all forms of extremism and terrorism as a threat to international peace and security.

== Tension between Qatar and other countries ==
The conflicts of priorities in the security and regional power aggravated the situation between Qatar and its neighbors due to regional power balances. The UAE, Saudi Arabia, Bahrain, and Egypt were interested in creating a common plan of action to oppose the influence of Iran in the Gulf, but Qatar was pursuing a more independent and diversified strategy on its own, which included strengthening their trade and diplomatic ties beyond the GCC bloc (Umar & Ghurab, 2023). The demands of the blockading countries were also elaborate and contained the shutting down of media houses perceived as enemy-like, the reduction of relations with Iran, and the confinement of the military relations with Turkey (Al Jazeera, 2020). The severity of these tensions and the strategic interests involved were marked by the imposition of the blockade (closing of airspace, travel restrictions). Qatar had its policy, but this was combined with the need to possess regional ambitions of its own, and this led to tension with the Gulf states that were insistent to have collective control over issues pertaining to their politics and security.

== Global reactions ==
=== United States ===
On May 20, 2017 during the Riyadh Summit, Saudi and Emirati leaders held a private dinner with Senior Advisor to the President Jared Kushner and Chief Strategist Steve Bannon to inform them of their plan to blockade Qatar.

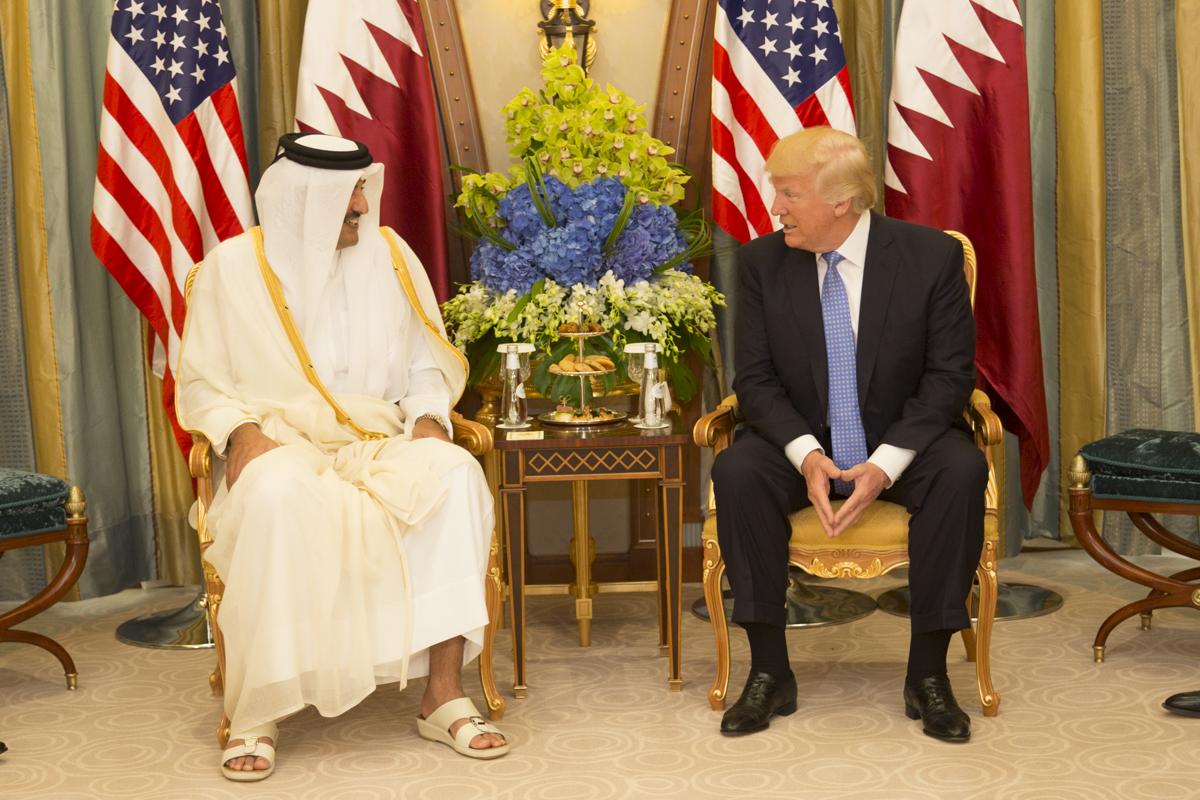
United States President Donald Trump with the Emir of Qatar Tamim bin Hamad Al Thani, May 2017.

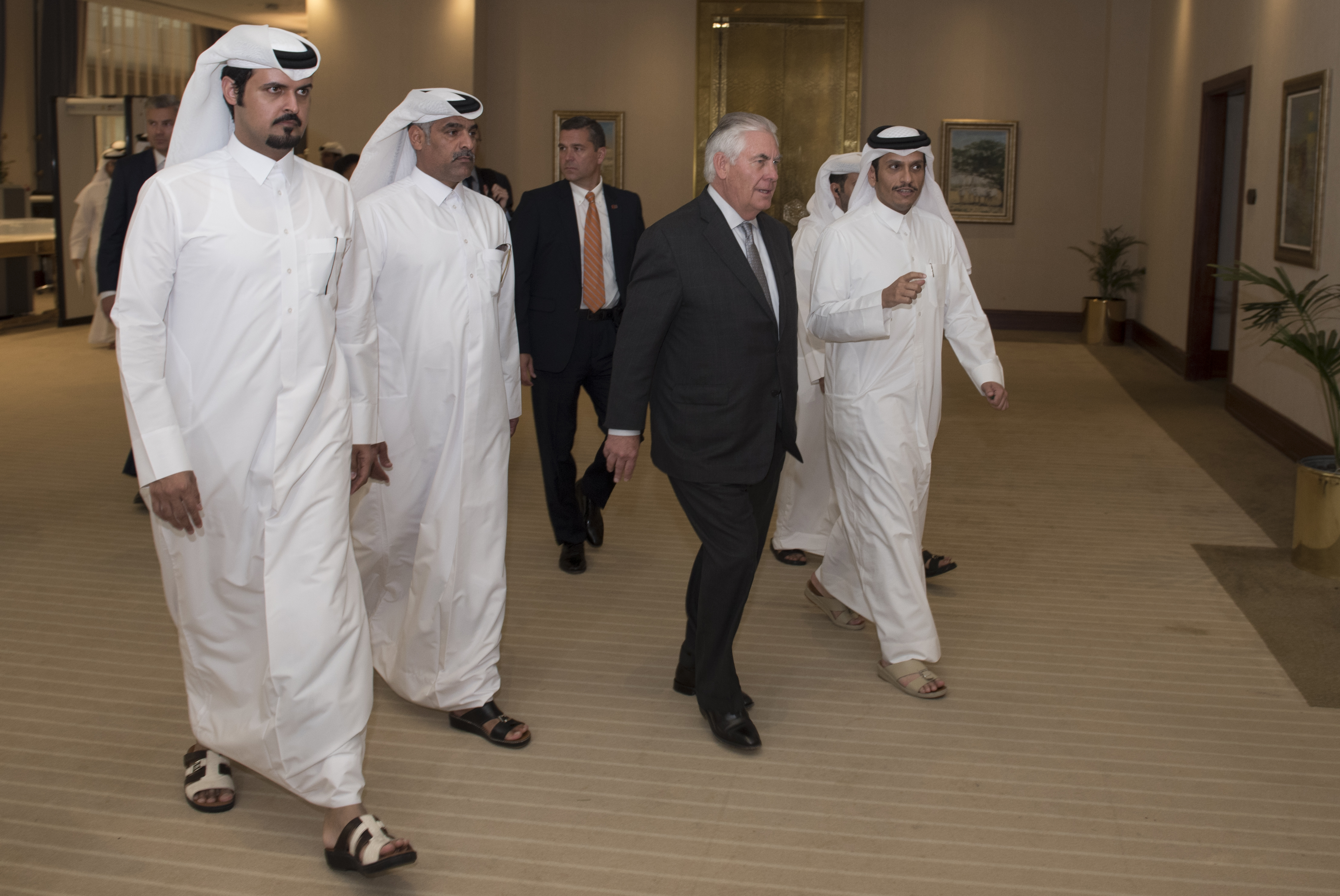
US Secretary of State Rex Tillerson being escorted to his meeting with the Emir of Qatar, Tamim Bin Hamad Al Thani on July 11, 2017.

United States President Donald Trump claimed credit for engineering the diplomatic crisis in a series of tweets. On 6 June, Trump began by tweeting: "During my recent trip to the Middle East I stated that there can no longer be funding of Radical Ideology. Leaders pointed to Qatar – look!" An hour and a half later, he remarked on Twitter that it was "good to see the Saudi Arabia visit with the King and 50 countries already paying off. They said they would take a hard line on funding extremism, and all references [sic] were pointing to Qatar. Perhaps this will be the beginning of the end to the horror of terrorism!" This was in contrast to attempts by the Pentagon and the Department of State to remain neutral. The Pentagon praised Qatar for hosting the Al Udeid Air Base and for its "enduring commitment to regional security." US Ambassador to Qatar, Dana Shell Smith, sent a similar message. Earlier, the US Secretary of State had taken a neutral stance and called for dialogue. On the same day, Trump also had a phone call with Saudi King Salman and rejected a Saudi proposal to invade Qatar. Instead, the United States requested Kuwaiti mediation with the goal of resolving the conflict.

On 8 June, President Donald Trump, during a phone call with the Emir of Qatar Tamim bin Hamad Al Thani, offered to act as a mediator in the conflict with a White House meeting between the parties if necessary. The offer was declined, and a Qatari official stated, "The emir has no plans to leave Qatar while the country is under a blockade." On 9 June, Trump once again put the blame on Qatar, calling the blockade "hard but necessary" while claiming that Qatar had been funding terrorism at a "very high level" and described the country as having an "extremist ideology in terms of funding." This statement was in conflict with Secretary of State Tillerson's comments on the same day, which called on Gulf states to ease the blockade. On 13 June 2017, after meeting with Tillerson in Washington, Saudi Foreign Minister Adel al-Jubeir stated that there was "no blockade" and "what we have done is we have denied them use of our airspace, and this is our sovereign right," and that the King Salman Centre for Humanitarian Aid and Relief would send food or medical aid to Qatar if needed. The following day, Trump authorized the sale of $12 billion of U.S. weapons to Qatar. According to The Intercept, Saudi Arabia and the UAE lobbied Trump to fire Rex Tillerson because he "intervened to stop a secret Saudi-led, UAE-backed plan to invade and essentially conquer Qatar."

On 21 June 2017, Trump told a crowd in Iowa that "We cannot let these incredibly rich nations fund radical Islamic terror or terrorism of any kind", noting that after his visit to Riyadh in May 2017 to meet with Saudi King Salman and urge an end to terror funding, "He has taken it to heart. And now they're fighting with other countries that have been funding terrorism. And I think we had a huge impact."

=== Iran ===
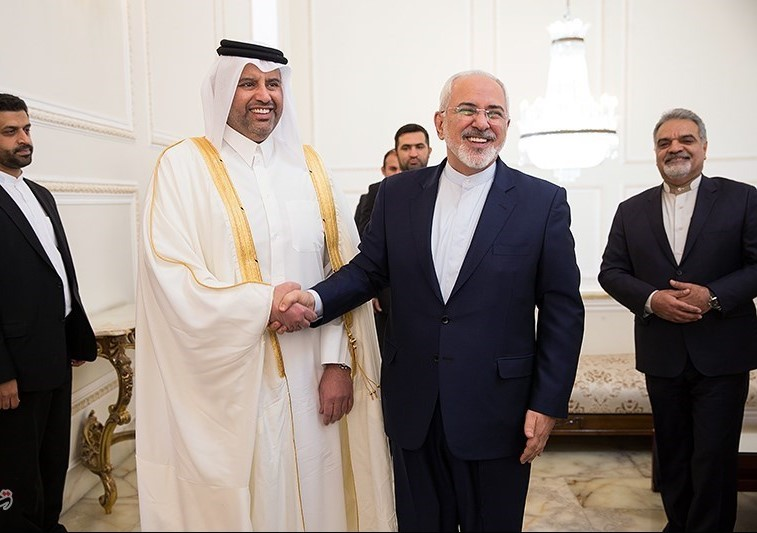
Qatari Minister Ahmed bin Jassim Al Thani and Iranian Foreign Minister Mohammad Javad Zarif (2017)

Throughout the crisis, Iran provided diplomatic and economic support to Qatar. On June 5, the day that the crisis erupted, Iran asked the Arab nations to settle their dispute through dialogue. After Saudi Arabia and its Persian Gulf allies blocked Qatar economically, Iran began sending food supplies to the country, including daily shipments of 1,100 tons of fruit and vegetables and 66 tons of beef. On 25 June, Iranian president Hassan Rouhani denounced the "siege" on Qatar, and in a phone call with Emir Tamim, he said that "Tehran will stand by Qatar's government". He also noted that Iran's airspace was open to Qatari aircraft.

On 23 August 2017, it was announced that Qatar would be returning its ambassador to Iran. In a press statement released by Qatar's foreign ministry, Qatar expressed its willingness to improve bilateral ties with Iran.

On 26 August 2018, during a phone conversation between Emir of Qatar and Iranian President Rouhani, Sheikh Tamim bin Hamad Al-Thani stated that "Thanks to the integrity and solidarity of Qatari people and cooperation and help of friend countries, especially Iran, we have overcome the issues of the unjust, cruel siege and we will never forget Iran's stances in this regard."

=== Other countries ===
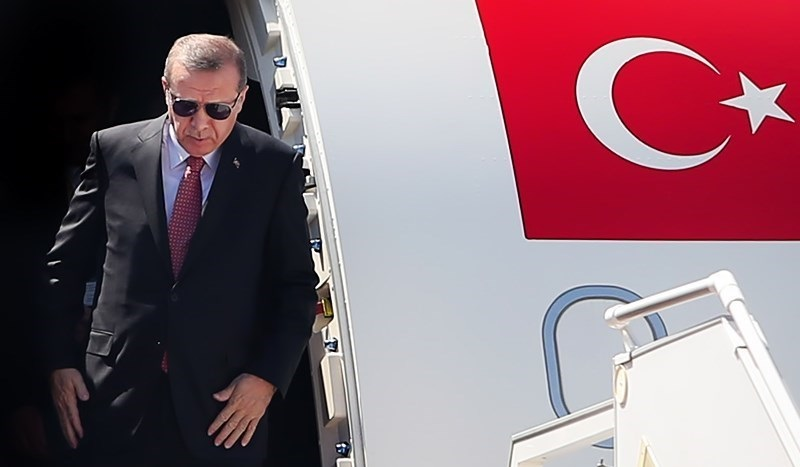
Turkey has supported Qatar in its diplomatic confrontation with a Saudi and Emirati-led bloc of countries

Multiple countries, the European Union and the United Nations called for resolution of the diplomatic crisis through dialogue, however, countries adopted varying positions. Some states, including the Maldives and Mauritania, aligned with the blockading coalition, while others such as Kuwait and Oman maintained neutrality and played mediating roles.

- Algeria
- Canada
- China
- Ethiopia
- France
- Germany
- Guinea
- India
- Indonesia
- Iran
- Italy
- Kuwait
- Malaysia
- Morocco
- Oman
- Pakistan
- Russia
- Somalia
- Sudan
- Switzerland
- Tunisia
- Turkey
- United Kingdom
- Venezuela

Israel's former defense minister, Avigdor Lieberman, described the situation as an "opportunity" for Israel, stating, "Some [Arab countries'] interests overlap with Israeli interests, including the issue with al-Jazeera." He went on to describe Al Jazeera Media Network as an "incitement machine" and "pure propaganda." Israeli Prime Minister Benjamin Netanyahu has demanded AJMN shut down its offices in Israel.

Reports that Mauritius had cut ties with Qatar were refuted by the Mauritian government. A report in the Saudi Gazette incorrectly stated that Mauritius had broken off ties with Qatar and that Mauritius' Vice-Prime Minister Showkutally Soodhun had issued a communiqué pledging his country's support for Saudi Arabia. This prompted further erroneous reports by other outlets. However, in an interview with Le Défi Media Group of Mauritius, Soodhun refuted claims that he had issued any such communiqué, and Mauritius' Ministry of Foreign Affairs issued a statement that Mauritius continued to maintain diplomatic relations with Qatar.

Pakistan stated that it had no plans to cut diplomatic relations with Qatar. The National Assembly passed a resolution urging all countries to "show restraint and resolve their differences through dialogue." The Pakistani Federal minister for Petroleum and Natural Resources said that "Pakistan will continue to import liquefied natural gas (LNG) from Qatar." A six-member Qatari delegation headed by a special envoy of the Qatari Emir visited Pakistan and asked Pakistan to play a positive role in resolving the diplomatic crisis. The former Prime Minister of Pakistan, Nawaz Sharif, was quoted as saying that "Pakistan would do 'all it can' to help resolve the crisis," as well as calling on the Muslim world to play a role in ending hostilities. A TRT report stated that Pakistan would deploy 20,000 troops in Qatar, which the Pakistani foreign ministry denied.

The Philippines suspended the deployment of migrant workers to Qatar on 6 June 2017. However, the next day, they allowed the deployment of returning workers and those with an Overseas Employment Certificate, but still maintained the suspension of the deployment of new workers. The suspension was later fully lifted on 15 June.

On 8 June 2017, Egypt's deputy UN Ambassador Ihab Moustafa called for the United Nations Security Council to launch an investigation into accusations that Qatar "paid up to $1 billion to a terrorist group active in Iraq" to free 26 Qatari hostages, including members of its royal family, which payment would violate UN resolutions. The Qataris were kidnapped on 16 December 2015 from a desert camp for falcon hunters in southern Iraq. The hostages were released eighteen months later in April 2017. Qatari diplomats responded to the Egyptian calls for an investigation by reaffirming their commitment to the UN resolutions towards eliminating the financing of terrorism.

In June 2017, the government of Qatar hired American attorney and politician John Ashcroft to lobby on its behalf and help the state deny international allegations of supporting terror.

On 24 November 2017, deputy chief of Dubai Police Lieutenant General Dhahi Khalfan blamed the 2017 Sinai attack on Al-Jazeera's reporting and called for the bombing of Al-Jazeera's headquarters by the Saudi-led coalition.

Israel has not shared a direct diplomatic relation with Qatar since 2012, yet over the past few years, the country has emerged as an unlikely peacemaker in the Middle East by extending a helping hand to Doha and strengthening its ties with its nemesis, UAE. Israel offered Doha to work along with it on Gaza's reconstruction in June 2020, changing Washington's narrative towards Qatar concerning its relation with Hamas as one focused on getting all parties to cooperate in support of the peace plan initiated by the Trump administration. In 2017, Israel condemned the legislation introduced in the US Congress, designating Qatar as a state sponsor of terrorism for having ties with Hamas. The legislation was filed by Ed Royce, a Republican, then Chairman of the House Foreign Affairs Committee. In the meantime, Israel also strengthened its partnership with the UAE by holding a meeting in Washington of the ambassadors of UAE and Bahrain with Prime Minister Benjamin Netanyahu. Israel maintained a balance between strengthening its relations with Abu Dhabi and simultaneously extending a helping hand to Doha.

According to the Country Reports on Terrorism released by the US Department of State in March 2022, counterterrorism cooperation signed in 2017 by Qatar included the participation of the United States and Qatar on terrorist screening and aviation security. In 2019, the Qatari government drafted new AML/CFT legislation, which was finalized and passed into law on September 11, 2019 which stated that Qatar maintains an inter-agency National Anti-Terrorism Committee (NATC) composed of representatives from more than 10 government agencies. The NATC is tasked with formulating Qatar's CT policy, ensuring inter-agency coordination, fulfilling Qatar's obligations to counter terrorism under international conventions, and participating in multilateral conferences on terrorism. U.S. officials met regularly with the chairman of the NATC to discuss implementation of the CT MOU and overall CT cooperation. The Qatar State Security Bureau (SSB) maintained an aggressive posture toward monitoring internal terrorism-related activities. Qatar is a member of MENAFATF. FIU, known as the Qatar Financial Information Unit, is a member of the Egmont Group. Qatar is also a member of the Defeat-ISIS Coalition's CIFG and the TFTC. In collaboration with other TFTC member states, Qatar in 2019 imposed one round of sanctions against individuals and entities affiliated with the Iranian regime's terror-support networks in the region. Qatar continued to maintain restrictions, imposed in 2017, on the overseas activities of Qatari charities, requiring all such activity to be conducted through one of two approved charities in an effort to better monitor charitable giving for terrorist financing abuse.

The Syrian Coalition of Revolutionary and Opposition Forces said "Syria is awaiting a more active Arab role that will contribute to putting an end to the nearly 10-year suffering of the Syrian people; help the Syrian people achieve their aspirations for freedom and independence; getting rid of the murderous Assad regime and Iranian sectarian militias; and putting an end the Iranian subversive project in Syria and the region."

The UK Financial Conduct Authority issued a notice against Banque Havilland for its manipulative trading strategies and imposed a fine of £10 million. The Luxembourg-based bank and its ex-employees were found involved in a 2017 plan to devalue the currency of Qatar. A former analyst with the bank, Vladimir Bolelyy, created a document that involved the plot to target Qatar's financial system in 2017. Bolelyy and the former London CEO, Edmund Rowland, were responsible for disseminating the document. A copy of the document was also sent to a representative of the Abu Dhabi sovereign wealth fund. The Emirates was closely connected to the owner of Banque Havilland, David Rowland. He was deeply involved with the UAE President Mohammed bin Zayed, who was referred to as "The Boss" by the bank employees. In January 2023, the FCA also banned and fined Edmund Rowland, Vladimir Bolelyy and a former senior manager David Weller.

=== United Nations ===
In November 2020, United Nations special rapporteur Alena Douhan published a preliminary report condemning the Saudi-led blockade of the State of Qatar and urged lifting the ban immediately due to human rights violations against the people of Qatar. The UAE, Saudi Arabia, Bahrain and Egypt-led blockade of Qatar was concluded to be illegal by the special rapporteur. Douhan has stated a final report would be presented to the United Nations Human Rights Council in September 2021.

Reportedly, it is prohibited under the UN Charter to impose any unilateral coercive measures against its member states unless authorized by the organization's relevant organs or found consistent with the principles composing the charter.

Within Qatar, the crisis also had domestic implications, including shifts in state-society relations and increased emphasis on economic self-sufficiency.[].

== Impact ==
=== Logistical implications ===
On 6 June 2017, Emirates Post of UAE halted postal services to Qatar.

At the start of the blockade, nearly 80 percent of Qatar's food requirements came from Persian Gulf Arab neighbors, with only 1 percent being produced domestically. Imports from outside the Gulf states usually came by land from Saudi Arabia. Immediately after the cutting of relations, local reports indicated residents swarmed grocery stores in hopes of stockpiling food. Many food delivery trucks were idled along the Saudi-Qatari border. On 8 June 2017, Qatari Foreign Minister Sheikh Mohammed bin Abdulrahman al-Thani said, "We're not worried about a food shortage, we're fine. We can live forever like this, we are well prepared." Qatar had talks with both Turkey and Iran to secure the supply of food. On 11 June 2017, Iran sent four cargo planes with fruit and vegetables and promised to continue the supply. Turkey pledged food and water supplies to go along with their troop deployment at their Turkish military base in Qatar.

As part of the Qatari government's response to lost food imports, it provided support to domestic agricultural company Baladna, which built a new dairy farm with imported cattle that was planned to produce enough milk to fulfill domestic demand for dairy products by June 2018.

=== Air travel ===
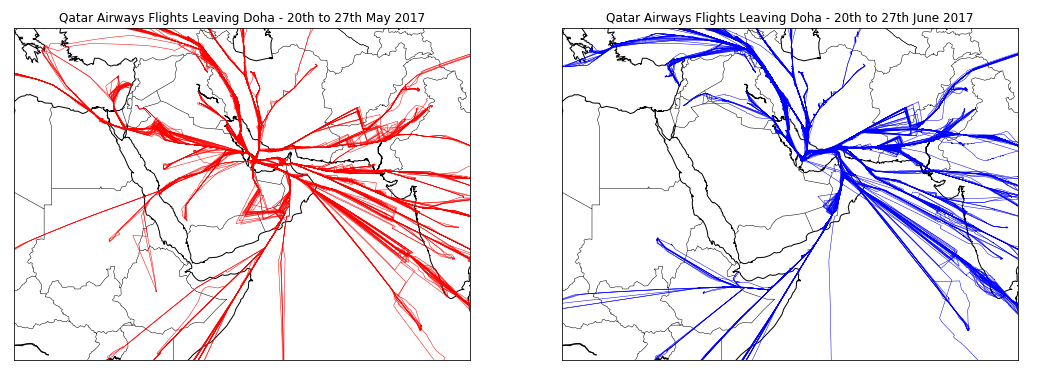
Maps showing the routes taken by Qatar Airways flights leaving Doha before and after the embargo was imposed. Data taken from FlightRadar24.

All airlines based in the blockading countries, including Emirates, suspended flights to and from Qatar. Gulf Air, EgyptAir, flydubai, Air Arabia, Saudi Arabian Airlines and Etihad Airways suspended their flights to and from Qatar. Bahrain, Egypt, Saudi Arabia, and the United Arab Emirates also banned overflights by aircraft registered in Qatar. Qatar rerouted flights to Africa and Europe via Iran, paying a "hefty" overflight fee for each such flight.

Qatar Airways in response suspended its flight operations to Saudi Arabia, the UAE, Egypt, and Bahrain.

Due to the closing of Saudi Arabia, UAE, Bahrain, and Egypt airspace to Qatar Airways, Oman Air took up a significant role transporting travelers from and to Doha, mostly through Iranian airspace, while still allowing Qatari passport holders to book flights. The travel embargo had a significant impact on foreign nationals living and working in Qatar, with about 100,000 Egyptians and citizens from other countries stranded there, unable to book direct flights or obtain travel documents for their return. Per request from Qatar, the blockade was under review by the International Civil Aviation Organization (ICAO), a UN-agency seeking a "consensus-based solution" for the resolution of the crisis.

On 31 July 2017, the agency asserted its neutrality in the conflict and announced that Qatar Airways would have access to three contingency routes over international waters in early August based on a preliminary agreement reached with the Saudi aviation authority (GACA) early that month. The ICAO, based in Montreal, also reminded all member countries to comply with the 1944 Chicago Convention on International Civil Aviation and its agenda.

In December 2020, Qatar's ambassador to the United Nations sent a letter to the UN Secretary-General António Guterres and the Security Council members, reporting airspace offenses by four Bahraini fighter jets. He said that Bahrain's military aircraft violated Qatar's airspace on 9 December by flying over the country's territorial waters.

=== Shipping ===
The United Arab Emirates banned Qatar-flagged ships from calling at Fujairah. It also banned vessels from Qatar from the port and vessels at the port from sailing directly to Qatar. Similar restrictions were put in place at Jebel Ali, which prior to the blockade handled over 85% of shipborne cargo for Qatar. Bahrain, Egypt and Saudi Arabia also banned Qatar-flagged ships from their ports.

On 8 June 2017, shipping giant Maersk was unable to transport in or out of Qatar entirely. Due to Qatar's shallow ports, large cargo ships are required to dock at Jebel Ali or other nearby ports where a feeder service transports the goods into Qatar. In response, Maersk and Swiss-based MSC vessels for Qatar were rerouted to Salalah and Sohar in Oman. Particularly smaller shipments of perishable and frozen foods have taken that route.

On 12 June 2017, Chinese shipping company COSCO announced suspension of services to and from Qatar. Taiwan's Evergreen Marine and Hong Kong's Orient Overseas Container Line had already suspended services.

=== Media ban ===
Hamad Saif al-Shamsi, the Attorney-General of the United Arab Emirates announced on 7 June that publishing expressions of sympathy towards Qatar through social media, or any type of written, visual or verbal form is considered illegal under UAE's Federal Penal Code and the Federal law on Combating Information Technology Crimes. Violators of this offense face between 3 and 15 years imprisonment, a fine of up to 500,000 Emirati dirhams ($136,000) or both. Bahrain also issued a similar statement with a penalty up to 5 years imprisonment and a fine.

Saudi Arabia, Egypt, Bahrain, and the UAE all blocked access to Qatari news agencies, including the controversial Qatar-based Al Jazeera. Saudi Arabia shut down the local office of Al Jazeera Media Network. The BBC speculated that changes to Al Jazeera would be a necessary part of any peaceful resolution. In June, Qatar-based beIN Sports (a spin-off from Al Jazeera) was also blocked by Saudi Arabia and the UAE. The UAE lifted this ban the following month, but the channels remained banned in Saudi Arabia. BeIN programming was illegally rebranded and redistributed by a large-scale pirate television operation known as beoutQ. beoutQ operated out of Saudi Arabia using the Arabsat satellites, and was promoted by Saudi politicians.

In 2018, the Saudi government also began to target beIN Sports for allegedly holding a monopoly in sports broadcasting, including revoking its broadcast licenses based on accusations of anti-competitive behaviour, and pulling its rights to the Asian Football Confederation in the Kingdom in 2019. beIN Sports considered the moves to be politically motivated, while it was feared that the service was normalising the practice of piracy.

=== Finances ===
The crisis had immediate and measurable economic effects across the Gulf region. In the early days of the blockade, Qatar's stock market experienced a significant decline, and regional financial markets reacted to increased uncertainty. The crisis had negative short-term impacts on GCC stock markets, reflecting investor sensitivity to political instability. For example, Standard & Poor's downgraded Qatar's debt by one notch from AA to AA−. Qatar's stock market dropped 7.3% on the first day of the crisis, and reached a 9.7% drop by 8 June 2017. Additionally, in the first months following the crisis the government of Qatar injected $38.5 billion, which was equivalent to 23% of the country's GDP, to support the country's economy and its banking sector. Trade and financial flows were also disrupted. Restrictions on land, air, and sea routes increased transportation costs and forced Qatar to rapidly diversify its supply chains, particularly through new trade links with Iran and Turkey.

Per S&P Global Ratings, banks in Qatar are strong enough to survive a withdrawal of all Gulf country deposits.

In August 2018, Brookfield Property Partners, 9% of which is owned by the Qatar Investment Authority, signed a 99-year lease on Jared Kushner's financially troubled 660 Fifth Avenue skyscraper. The deal raised suspicions that Qatar was attempting to influence the Trump administration.

Despite the ongoing diplomatic blockade led by Saudi Arabia, international banks like HSBC, Goldman Sachs and others sought to repair their ties with Qatar by building stronger financial and business relations. Saudi Arabia and the United Arab Emirates informally warned the bankers not to have close relations with Doha or else there would be consequences.

On 20 January 2019, Sheikh Tamim bin Hamad Al Thani attended the opening session of the Arab Economic Summit in Beirut, Lebanon. This helped Qatar increase its influence and soft power in the region. Sheikh Tamim Bin Hamad Al Thani and Mauritanian President Mohamed Ould Abdel Aziz were the only two Arab leaders to attend the summit. Since Sheikh Tamim was the only GCC leader to attend, he received praise from the President of Lebanon himself, Michel Aoun. Hilal Khashan, a professor of political science at the American University of Beirut, said "He became the star of the summit."

Overall, Qatar's annual GDP declined by 1.5% in 2017, though it increased by 1.2% in 2018 and 0.8% in 2019 despite the diplomatic crisis, though it would decline 3.6% in 2020 following the COVID-19 pandemic. In the year the crisis ended in 2021 Qatar's annual GDP increased 1.6%.

=== Energy ===
Qatar is a global leader in liquefied natural gas production. Despite the severing of ties, Qatari natural gas continued to flow to the UAE and Oman through Abu Dhabi based Dolphin Energy's pipeline. The pipeline meets about 30–40 percent of UAE's energy needs. Shipping constraints from the crisis rerouted multiple shipments of oil and gas to and from the Gulf, which caused reverberations in many local energy markets. On 8 June 2017, gas futures spiked nearly 4 percent in the United Kingdom, which had nearly a third of all its imported gas arriving from Qatar. There was a secondary effect of the dispute on worldwide supplies of helium, which is often extracted from natural gas. Qatar is the world's second largest supplier of helium (the US ranks first).

In March 2019, Qatar lodged a complaint to International Atomic Energy Agency regarding the United Arab Emirates Barakah nuclear power plant, stating that it poses a serious threat to regional stability and the environment. The UAE denied that there are safety issues with the plant, which is being built by Korea Electric Power Corporation (KEPCO) with operation by French utility Électricité de France, and stated "The United Arab Emirates ... adheres to its commitment to the highest standards of nuclear safety, security and non-proliferation."

=== 23rd and 24th Gulf Cup ===
The 23rd Arabian Gulf Cup was scheduled to be hosted in Qatar. In November 2017, Saudi Arabia, United Arab Emirates, and Bahrain pulled out of the Gulf Cup due to the Qatar boycott. On 7 December 2017, it was announced that Kuwait would host the football tournament after the three national teams withdrew for the purpose of boycotting the event being located in Qatar.

Qatar hosted the 24th Arabian Gulf Cup in 2019. Bahrain, Saudi Arabia, and United Arab Emirates announced their participation in the tournament on 12 November (two weeks before the event kicked off), reversing an attempted second boycott of the event.

=== Qatari military relations ===
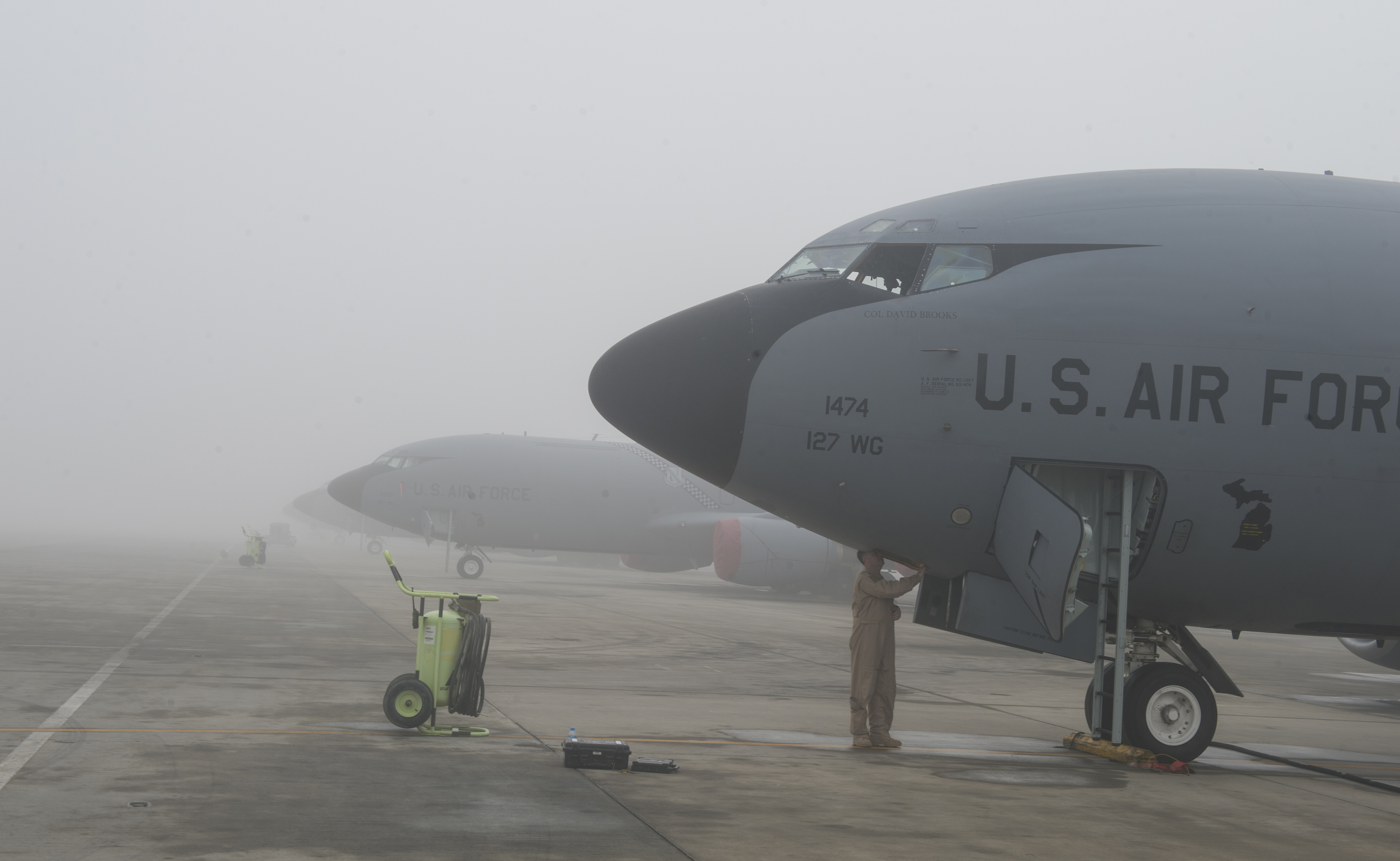
Al Udeid Air Base in Qatar

On 7 June 2017, the Turkish parliament passed, with 240 votes in favour and 98 against, a legislative act first drafted in May allowing Turkish troops to be deployed to a Turkish military base in Qatar. During a speech on 13 June 2017, the President of Turkey, Recep Tayyip Erdoğan, condemned the boycott of Qatar as "inhumane and against Islamic values" and stated that "victimising Qatar through smear campaigns serves no purpose". On 23 June 2017, Turkey rejected demands to shut down its military base in Qatar.

Qatar hosts about 10,000 US troops at Al Udeid Air Base, which houses the forward operating base of United States Central Command that is strategically located for US airstrikes in Syria, Iraq, and Afghanistan. A Pentagon spokesperson claimed the diplomatic crisis would not affect the US military missions in Qatar.

On 30 January 2018 an inaugural United States-Qatar Strategic Dialogue meeting was held, co-chaired by U.S. Secretary of State Rex Tillerson, U.S. Secretary of Defense Jim Mattis, Qatari Deputy Prime Minister and Minister of State for Defence Affairs Khalid al-Attiyah and Qatari Deputy Prime Minister and Foreign Minister Mohammed bin Abdulrahman Al Thani. The meeting expressed the need for an immediate resolution of the crisis which respects Qatar's sovereignty. In a Joint Declaration on Security Cooperation, the United States expressed its readiness to deter and quell any external threat to Qatar's territorial integrity. Qatar offered to help fund the expansion of facilities at US bases in Qatar.

On 25 March 2018, the United States Central Command (CENTCOM) officially quashed rumours that the Incirlik Air Base in Turkey and the Al Udeid Air Base in Qatar will be closed despite the ongoing regional conflict.

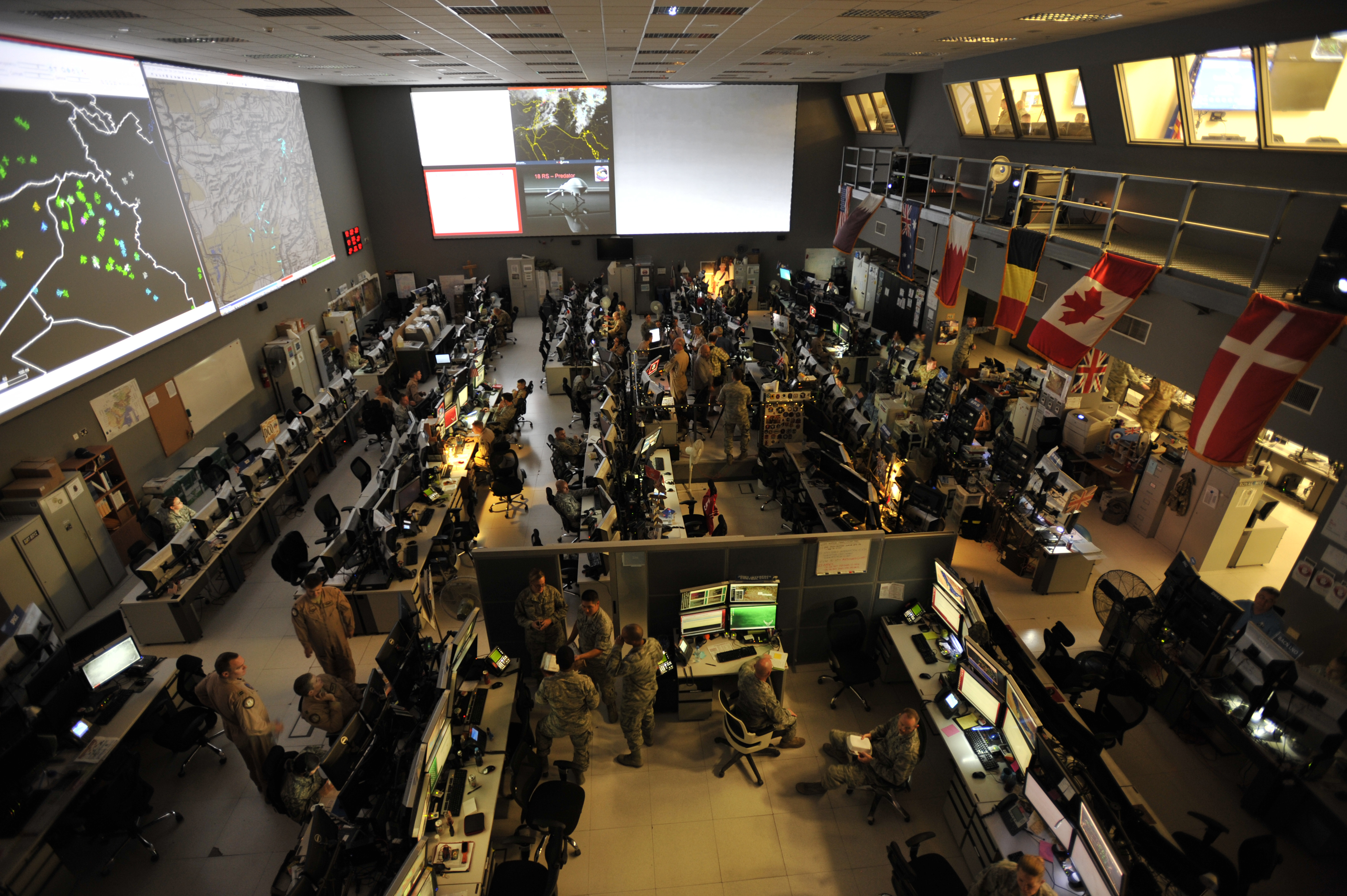
Combined Air and Space Operations Center (CAOC) in Qatar provides command and control of air power throughout Iraq, Syria, Afghanistan, and 17 other nations.

In January 2018, Qatar's ambassador communicated with Russia with the intent to purchase S-400 surface-to-air missiles. Both countries signed an agreement on military and technical cooperation in 2017. In May 2018, the French daily newspaper Le Monde reported that King Salman of Saudi Arabia would take military action if Qatar installed the Russian air defence system. However, a senior Russian official remarked the system would still be delivered even against the will of Saudi Arabia. The Saudis were themselves approaching Russia to improve economic and military ties in 2017, but bargaining relating to the arms deal was hindered by concerns the United States and Saudi Arabia had with regard to the Russian position towards Iran's military and strategic involvement in the Middle East.

In June 2018, Qatar expressed its wish to join NATO. However, NATO declined Qatar's membership proposal, stating that only additional European countries could join according to Article 10 of NATO's founding treaty. Qatar and NATO have previously signed a security agreement together in January 2018.

=== Arab League Council 2017 ===
During the 148th Session of the Arab League Council at the level of Foreign Ministers which was held in Cairo, Qatar's State Minister for Foreign Affairs, Sultan Al Muraikhi, got into a heated argument with Saudi delegate Ahmad Al Qattan. The argument was caused after Al Muraikhi gave a short speech about how Qatar had to go back to supporting Iran after it recalled the Qatari ambassador to Iran to support Saudi Arabia in 2016.

=== 2019 Asian Cup ===
During the semi-final match in the UAE between the Qatar national football team and the tournament hosts the United Arab Emirates, the UAE supporters threw shoes and bottles onto the pitch. This conduct was preceded by booing the Qatari national anthem.

A British-Sudanese football fan was allegedly beaten by fans for wearing a Qatar football shirt to a match in which Qatar was playing and then arrested by the UAE police. The Guardian claimed he had been arrested for wearing a Qatar football shirt, but this was denied by UAE authorities who stated he had been arrested for wasting police time and making false statements of being assaulted. The National showed photos of other fans waving the Qatari flag and wearing Qatari football shirts without any instances of arrests in the final.

=== 2022 FIFA World Cup ===
In late September, Saudi Arabia, Yemen, Mauritania, the United Arab Emirates, Bahrain and Egypt in a letter asked FIFA to replace Qatar as 2022 FIFA World Cup host, calling the country a "base of terrorism", although FIFA stated their president Gianni Infantino had not received any such document. "The FIFA president has never received such a letter and subsequently has not done any comment on that," stated a FIFA spokesman. Hassan Al Thawadi, general secretary of Qatar's FIFA World Cup organizing committee, denied these claims and stated that the various logistical issues arising from the crisis were being resolved. The World Cup took place in Qatar in November and December 2022 as planned.

== Resolution ==
An article published by the Financial Times stated that, according to people briefed on the matter, the Kingdom of Saudi Arabia moved towards ending the 2017 blockade against the State of Qatar after the victory of President-elect Joe Biden in 2020. An advisor to Saudi Arabia and the United Arab Emirates, was quoted as calling the shift in the Kingdom's policy towards Qatar "a gift for Biden" signaling that Crown Prince Mohammed bin Salman had shown willingness "to take steps" towards resolving differences with Qatar. The prince is said to have been intimidated by the incoming administration, as the former administration had reportedly supported the Riyadh government in times of crisis such as casualties in the Yemen war, detention of activists, the murder of Jamal Khashoggi, etc. On the other hand, UAE's ambassador to the US, Yousef al-Otaiba, was quoted as stating that ending the dispute was not a priority, referring to the ongoing differences with the blockaded nation.

On 4 January 2021, Kuwait, Saudi Arabia's neighbour and a fellow GCC member, along with the United States, jointly brokered a deal in which Saudi Arabia would end its blockade of Qatar and reopen their shared land border.

On 5 January 2021, Qatar's Emir, Sheikh Tamim bin Hamad Al Thani, arrived in al-Ula, Saudi Arabia, for a GCC summit. Later, the leaders signed the al-Ula statement. Before the signing, Bin Salman said that the support of Kuwait and the United States had resulted in "the al-Ula declaration agreement that will be signed at this blessed summit, in which the Gulf, Arab and Islamic solidarity and stability were emphasized." In addition to the statement, a final communique was signed. Saudi Foreign Minister Faisal bin Farhan al-Saud said Saudi Arabia and its allies agreed to restore full ties with Doha, including resumption of flights. Qatar did not fulfill any of the original 13 demands, with analysts saying that the Gulf states agreed instead to a vague "joint security declaration".

The United Nations Secretary-General, António Guterres, welcomed the end of the crisis and the opening of the airspace, land, and sea borders between Saudi Arabia, the United Arab Emirates, Bahrain, Egypt, and Qatar. In a statement issued on 5 January 2021, he expressed hope that the countries concerned will continue to be positive, to strengthen their relations. He also recognized the contributions of the late Emir of Kuwait and late Sultan of Oman, who worked tirelessly towards resolving the Gulf rift. One Middle East policy analyst believed that the secret pact among the Gulf leaders is likely to have been multi-level, which includes several bilateral agreements between individual states rather than a unitary document.

As of July 2023, Bahrain, Chad, Egypt, Maldives, Mauritania, Saudi Arabia, Senegal, and the UAE had restored diplomatic ties with Qatar.

Within Qatar itself, there still exists continuing retaliation to nationals of the blockade countries. Egyptians are not allowed to obtain resident status in the country due to a block in place on Egyptians by the Qatari Ministry of Interior. This issue extends to Egyptians being issued work visas, family visas, or other visas into Qatar that would allow them to apply for resident status, resulting in multiple cases of family separation or leaving the country. While the Qatari Government denies these allegations, in 2019 the country's secretary-general of the National Tourism Council, Akbar al-Baker, described the Egyptian people as "enemies", this being one of very few times an official has discussed the issue of retaliation against Egyptians.

== See also ==
- 2017 Lebanon–Saudi Arabia dispute
- Arab Cold War
- Axis of Resistance
- International Maritime Security Construct
- International propagation of Salafism and Wahhabism
- Iran–Israel proxy conflict
- Iran–Saudi Arabia proxy conflict
- Middle Eastern Cold War (disambiguation)
- OPEC
- Qatar–Saudi Arabia diplomatic conflict
- Russia–Syria–Iran–Iraq coalition
- Shia–Sunni relations
- State-sponsored terrorism § Saudi Arabia
