= Special Rapporteur on the negative impact of unilateral coercive measures =

United Nations human rights expert

- Incumbent; Zeina Jallad since May 2026
- Reports to: UN High Commissioner for Human Rights
- Formation: 3 October 2014; 11 years ago
- Website: www.ohchr.org/en/special-procedures/sr-unilateral-coercive-measures

The Special Rapporteur on the negative impact of unilateral coercive measures is an independent human rights expert appointed by the United Nations, one of its many special rapporteurs on various topics related to human rights. The mandate of this special rapporteur was established after human rights organizations highlighted the adverse effects of international sanctions, such as those imposed on Iraq, on the general population. The mandate aims to ensure justice and establish remedies in cases of serious human rights violations and grave breaches of international humanitarian law, as well as to foster the restoration of trust in state institutions and promote the rule of law in accordance with international human rights standards.

== Mandate ==
The UN Human Rights Council established this mandate on 3 October 2014, via a resolution that also defined the scope of the mandate. It is limited to a three-year term and is subject to regular renewal. The mandate was most recently renewed on 9 October 2017.

The appointee is not a United Nations employee but is commissioned by the UN to carry out the mandate. To this end, the UN Human Rights Council issued a code of conduct. The independent status of the mandate holder, who serves in an honorary capacity, is crucial for the impartial performance of their duties. The term of office for the mandate is limited to a maximum of six years.

The Special Rapporteur conducts thematic studies and develops guidelines for the advancement of human rights. Upon the invitation of states, the Special Rapporteur undertakes country visits and may issue recommendations in an advisory capacity. They review communications and submit proposals to states on how to remedy any existing shortcomings. They also conduct follow-up procedures to assess the implementation of these recommendations. To this end, they prepare annual reports for submission to the UN Human Rights Council.

== Officeholders ==
- 2015–2020 Idriss Jazairy – Algeria
- 2020–2026 Alena Douhan – Belarus
- Since May 2026 Zeina Jallad – Palestine

== See also ==
- List of UN Special Rapporteurs
