= As-Salām al-Amīrī =

National anthem of Qatar

English: Peace to the Emir
- السلام الأميري
- National anthem of Qatar
- Also known as: النشيد الوطني القطري (English: Qatari national anthem)
- Lyrics: Sheikh Mubarak bin Sayf al-Thani
- Music: Abdulaziz Nassir al-Ubaydun al-Fakhru
- Adopted: 7 December 1996
- Preceded by: National anthem of Qatar (1954-1996)

Audio sample
- U.S. Navy Band instrumental version: file; help

"As-Salām al-Amīrī" (/ˌæs.səˈlɑːm ˌæl.əˈmɪəri/; Arabic: السلام الأميري, lit. 'Peace to the Emir') is the national anthem of Qatar, written by Sheikh Mubarak bin Sayf al-Thani and composed by Abdulaziz Nassir al-Ubaydan al-Fakhru.

== History and use ==
The anthem was adopted on 7 December 1996, upon the accession of Hamad bin Khalifa Al Thani to the throne. It was first used at a Gulf Cooperation Council meeting held in Qatar in December of that year.

In 2015, Sheikh Mubarak bin Sayf al-Thani presented the first written draft of the anthem to the Qatar National Museum, where it was to be put on display.

== Lyrics ==
Arabic original

جوقة:
قَسَمًا قَسَمًا
قَسَمًا بِمَنْ رَفَعَ السَّمَاء
قَسَمًا بِمَنْ نَشَرَ الضِّيَاء
قَطَرٌ سَتَبْقَى حُرَّةً تَسْمُو بِرُوحِ الْأَوْفِيَاء

سِيْرُواْ عَلَى نَهْجِ الْأُلَى سِيرُواْ
وَعَلَى ضِيَاءِ الْأَنْبِيَاء
قَطَرٌ بِقَلْبِي سِيرَةٌ عَزٌّ وَأَمْجَادُ الْإِبَاء

𝄇 قَطَرٌ الرِّجَالِ الْأَوَّلِينْ
حُمَاتُنَا يَوْمَ النِّدَاء
وَحَمَائِمٌ يَوْمَ السَّلَامْ
جَوَارِحٌ يَوْمَ الْفِدَاء 𝄆

جوقة

MSA Romanization

Jawqa:
Qasamān Qasamān
Qasamān biman rafaʿa as-samāʾ
Qasamān biman našara aḍ-ḍiyāʾ
Qaṭarun satabqa ḥurratan tasmū birūḥ il-ʾawfiyāʾ

Sīrū ʿalā nahji l-ʾawlā sīrū
Wa-ʿalā ḍiyāʾ il-ʾanbiyāʾ
Qaṭarun biqalbī sīratun ʿazun waʾamjādu l-ʾibāʾ

𝄆 Qaṭarun r-rijāli l-ʾawwalīn
Ḥumātunā yawm an-nidā
Wa-ḥamāʾimun yawm as-salām
Jawāriḥun yawm al-fidāʾ 𝄇

Jawqa

IPA transcription (Note: See Help:IPA/Arabic and Qatari Arabic.)

[dʒɑw.qɑ]
[qɑ.sæ.mæːn qɑ.sæ.mæːn]
[qɑ.sæ.mæːn bɪ.mæn rɑ.fɑ.ʕæ‿s.sæ.mæːʔ]
[qɑ.sæ.mæːn bɪ.mæn næ.ʃɑ.rɑ‿ðˤ.ðˤɪ.jæːʔ]
[qɑ.tˤɑ.rʊn sæ.tæb.qɑ ħʊr.rɑ.tæn tæs.mʊː bɪ.rʊː.ħɪ‿l.ʔɑw.fi.jæːʔ]

[siː.rʊː ʕɑ.læː næh.dʒɪ‿l.ʔu.læː siː.rʊː]
[wɑ.ʕɑ.læː ðˤɪ.jæː.ʔɪ‿l.ʔæn.bi.jæːʔ]
[qɑ.tˤɑ.rʊn bɪ.qɑl.bɪː siː.ræ.tʊn ʕæ.zʊn wɑ ʔæm.dʒæː.dʊ‿l.ʔɪ.bæːʔ]

𝄆 [qɑ.tˤɑ.rʊ‿r.rɪ.dʒæː.lɪ‿l.ʔæw.wæ.liːn]
[ħʊ.mæː.tʊ.næː jɑwm æn.ni.dæːʔ]
[wɑ ħæ.mæː.ʔɪ.mʊn jɑwm æs.sæ.læːm]
[dʒæ.wæː.rɪ.ħʊn jɑwm æl.fi.dæːʔ] 𝄇

[dʒɑw.qɑ]

English translation

Chorus:
I swear, I swear
Swearing by the One who raised the sky
Swearing by the One who spread the light
Qatar will always be free, elevated by the spirit of the loyal

Travel the high road
Travel by the guiding light of the Prophets
Qatar, in my heart, is an epic of dignity and the glories of the forefathers

𝄆 Qatar is the land of the foremost men
Who protect us in time of distress,
Doves at times of peace
Birds of prey they are at times of sacrifice 𝄇

Chorus
