= Tameem Al-Muhaza =

Qatari footballer (born 1996)

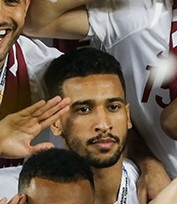
- Al-Muhaza with Qatar at the 2019 AFC Asian Cup

Personal information
- Full name: Tameem Mohammed Eisa Al-Muhaza
- Date of birth: 21 July 1996 (age 30)
- Place of birth: Qatar
- Height: 1.77 m (5 ft 9 1/2 in)
- Position: Defender

Team information
- Current team: Al-Wakrah
- Number: 14

Youth career
- ASPIRE
- 2014: Atlético Madrid

Senior career*
Years	Team	Apps	(Gls)
2015–2023	Al-Gharafa	34	(0)
2015–2016	→ Cultural Leonesa (loan)	6	(0)
2021–2022	→ Al-Khor (loan)	8	(0)
2023–2024	Al-Markhiya	13	(0)
2024–	Al-Wakrah	9	(0)

International career
- Qatar U20
- Qatar U23
2019–	Qatar	1	(0)
Medal record
Representing Qatar
Men's Football
AFC Asian Cup
Winner	2019 UAE	Team
- * Club domestic league appearances and goals as of 17 January 2026

Tameem Al-Muhaza (Arabic:تميم المهيزع) (born 21 July 1996) is a Qatari footballer. He currently plays for Al-Wakrah as a defender.

== Career ==
In 2014, he was playing for Atlético Madrid's youth teams. He was loaned out to ASPIRE-owned Spanish club Cultural Leonesa in November 2015.
