= Margaret Jeans =

British school teacher and businesswoman in Oman

Margaret (Maggie) Jeans (née James) OBE (born 8 May 1953) is a British woman that has developed the relationship between Britain and the Sultanate of Oman. She has lived in Muscat since 1990. In 2016, she was appointed an OBE on Queen Elizabeth's 90th Birthday Honours for her services to British-Omani relations.

== Education ==
Margaret Jeans was born in Swindon, Wiltshire and attended Commonweal Grammar School. She then went on to study Drama at the Birmingham School of Speech Training and Dramatic Art. After completing her Drama studies, Maggie worked for a brief stint at the Swindon Evening Advertiser between 1971 and 1972. Following this, Jeans began teaching English and Drama at Merrywood Girls School in Bristol for 16 years from 1974 to 1990. Whilst teaching at Merrywood, Jeans entered into higher education on a part-time basis at the University of Bristol, firstly achieving her Bachelor of Education (B.Ed.) in 1982, then her Master of Education (M.Ed.) in 1987.

== Career ==
Jeans arrived in the Sultanate in 1990 with her late husband, Professor William Dampier Jeans (1928 -2015), to join the faculty of the newly established Sultan Qaboos University (SQU) which had opened in 1986, the country's first government university. She worked as an Education Officer in the college of Medicine, helping to create the Overseas Elective Programme for medical students.

In 1996, Jeans set up Al Manahil Educational Consultancy. In 2000, Al Manahil International LLC began to represent Oxford and Cambridge University Press throughout the Sultanate.

She has been a coordinator of the British Business Forum Oman, in conjunction with the UK Trade & Investment Department (UKTI) for many years, helping to develop the relationship between the UKTI and Oman, encouraging the exchange of views and opinions about existing and potential business opportunities in the Sultanate, and how best to promote trade between the United Kingdom and Oman. Jeans also acted as a supervisor for the Association of Chartered Certified Accountants (ACCA) examination centre in Muscat for several years. She helped to organise the 2018 Scots in Oman Ball, bringing a private Scottish Highland Ball to Muscat, Oman. She is also an advisor to Polaris Media Management LTD, a Manchester based PR and digital publishing firm as their Oman adviser, helping to create and maintain relationships with businesses based in Oman.

Jeans founded the Oman Palliative Care support group in May 2018, following the death of her husband from cancer in November 2015.

== Honours ==
Jeans was awarded an Order of the British Empire (OBE) in the 2016 Birthday Honours list for services to Oman British relations.
