= United Arab Emirates–United Kingdom relations =

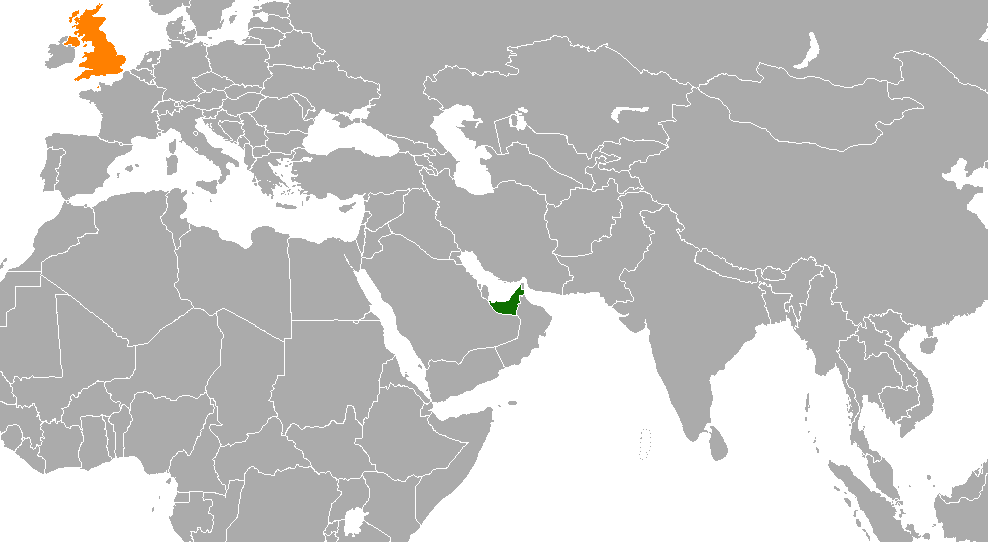

- United Arab Emirates: United Kingdom

Diplomatic mission
- Embassy of the United Arab Emirates, London: Embassy of the United Kingdom, Abu Dhabi

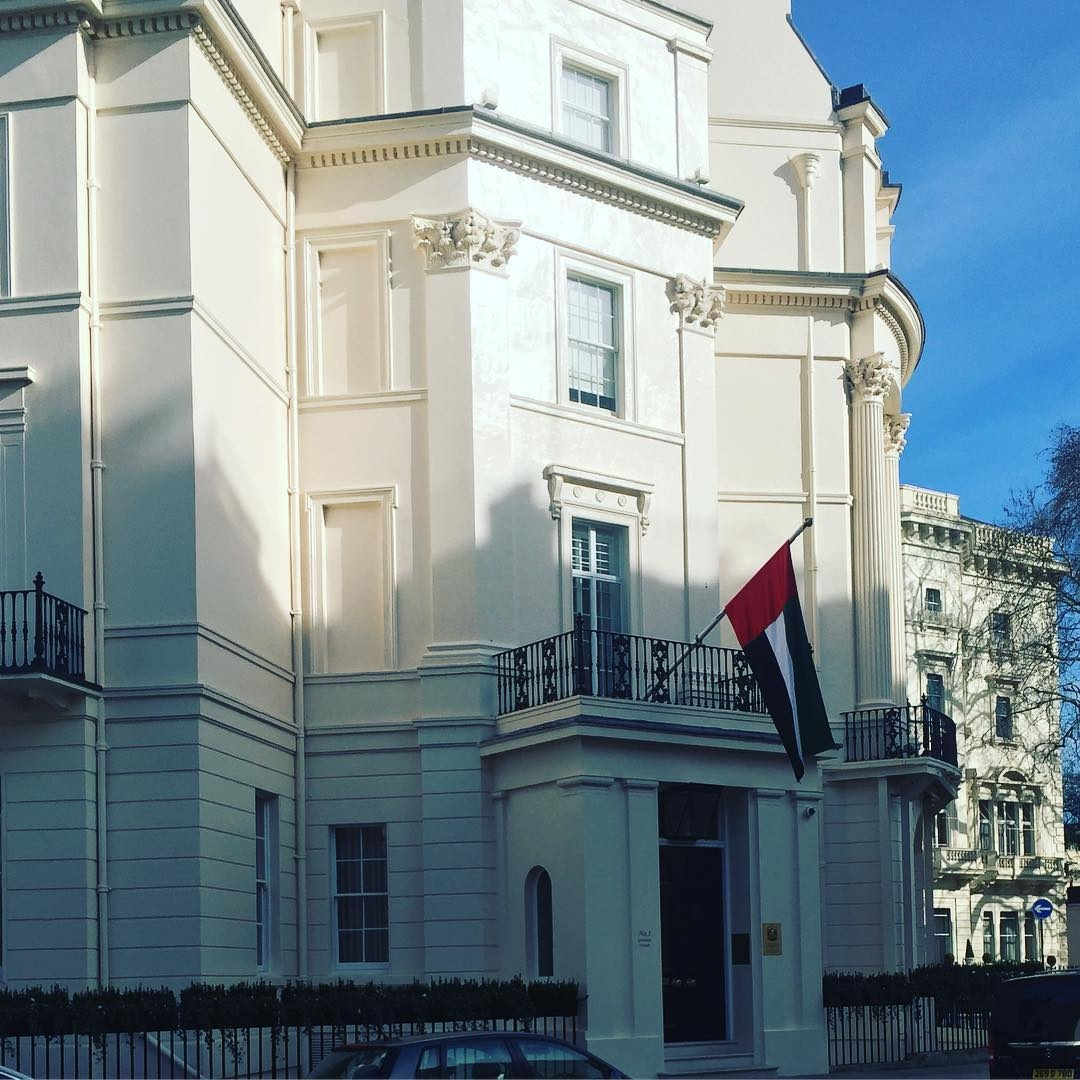
Emirati Embassy in London

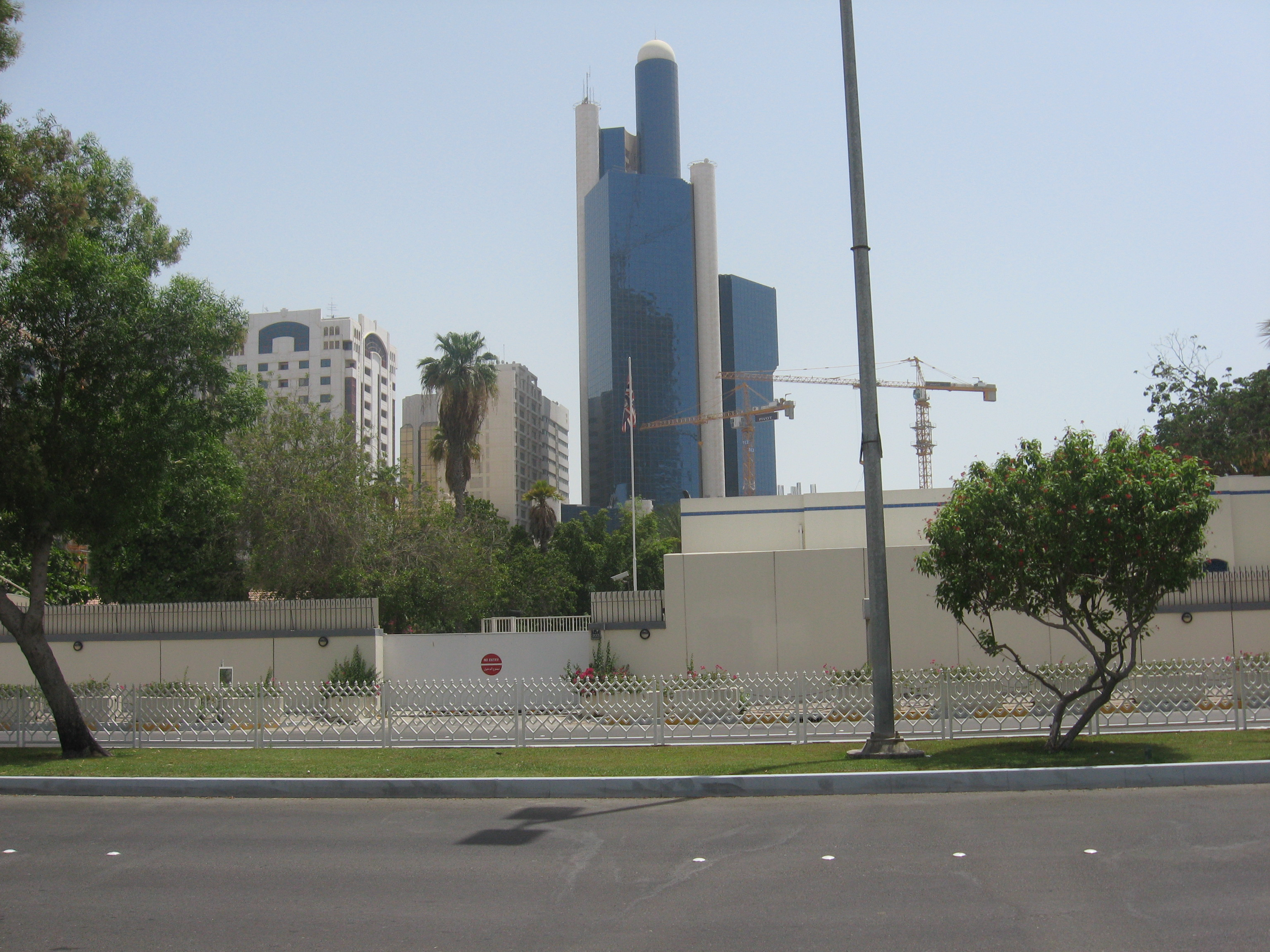
British embassy in Abu Dhabi

The United Arab Emirates–United Kingdom relations is a historical relationship that dates back to 1820 with the signing of the General Maritime Treaty of 1820.

The United Arab Emirates has an embassy in London while the United Kingdom of Great Britain and Northern Ireland maintains an embassy in Abu Dhabi and is unique in having another embassy in Dubai, albeit with His Majesty's Consul-General to Dubai and the Northern Emirates, as opposed to a separate British Ambassador.

Over 1.4 million visitors from the UK visit the United Arab Emirates each year, and more than 130,000 British citizens live in the UAE. In 2024, the UAE was the UK’s largest trading partner in the region and its 19th largest trading partner globally.

== History ==
Before the country's formation in 1971, the emirates, which currently constitute the UAE, were once all part of the Trucial States and independent sheikhdoms allied with the United Kingdom, assigned as British protectorates by the General Maritime Treaty of 1820. The main purpose of this relationship was to ensure the passage to British India by excluding pirates who then raided the country's coast on the Persian Gulf.

An agreement between British government officials and the ruler of Sharjah in 1932 led to the construction of a fortified airfield known as Al Mahatta Fort, allowing a stop on the Imperial Airways route to Brisbane, Australia. Royal Air Force aircraft were subsequently allowed to refuel at Sharjah during World War II. Al Mahatta Museum is a reminder of the BOAC (formerly Imperial Airways) and other flights that used to frequent the UAE's first airport. Britain also played a significant role in the formation of the United Arab Emirates, creating a deep and historic relationship between the two nations. It was Britain's defence of the Sheikhs of Abu Dhabi in the 1940s and 50s against encroachments and claims on their lands by the then-King of Saudi Arabia that safeguarded the territorial integrity of what would become the United Arab Emirates. In 1952, a Saudi force invaded the area of what is now Al Ain (Buraimi - Omani side), and it was the British, in conjunction with the Sheikhs of Abu Dhabi and the Sultan of Oman, who forcibly evicted them in a conflict known as the Buraimi Dispute. The tensions related to the Buraimi Dispute led to the formation, in 1951, of the Trucial Oman Scouts (formerly the Trucial Oman Levies): a British officered, locally raised force that ensured safety in the Emirates until it was disbanded in December 1971 with the formation of the United Arab Emirates. The Trucial Oman Scouts played a crucial role in the development of the UAE's independent military, as the remnants of the Scouts formed the nucleus of what would eventually become the UAE Armed Forces.

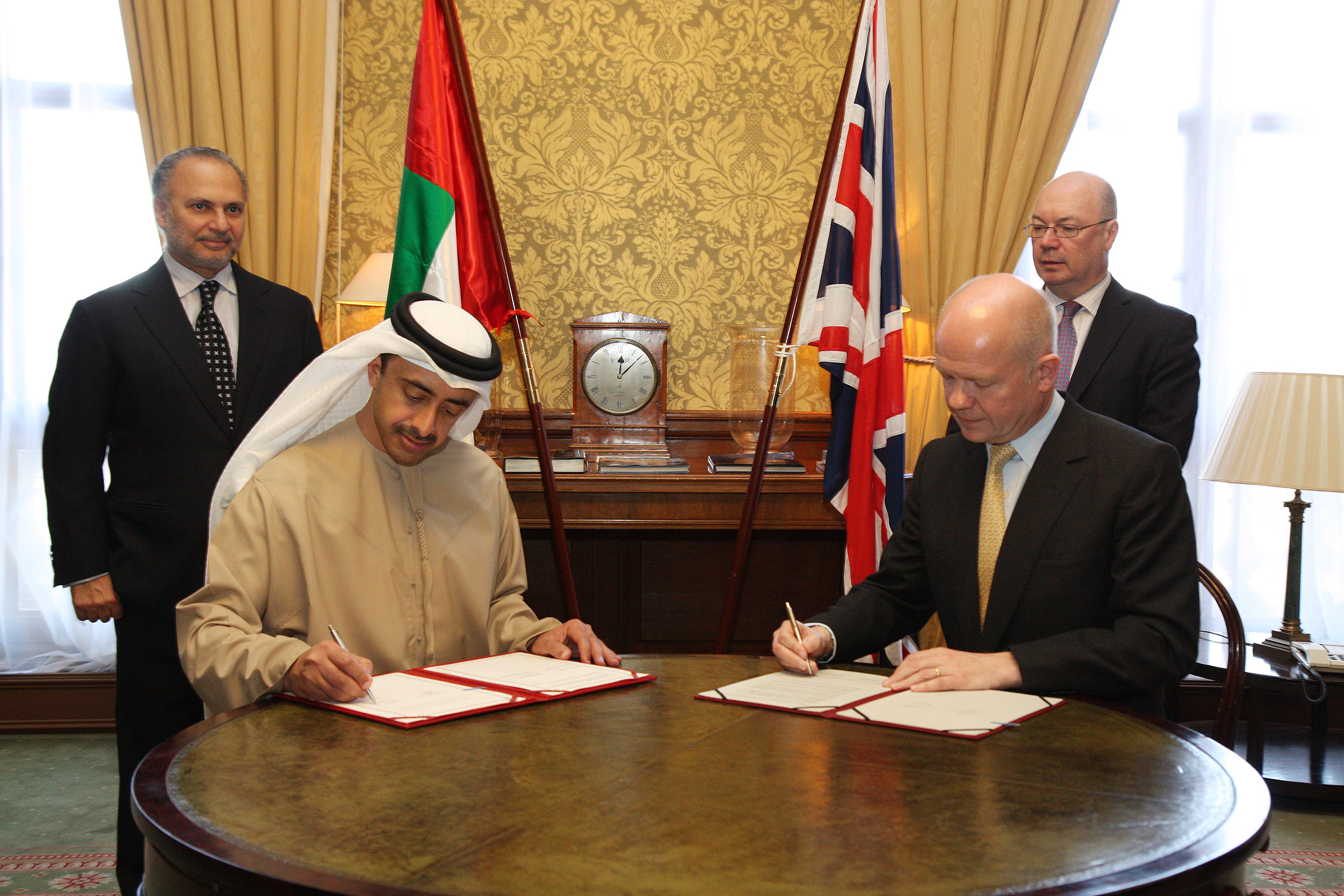
Foreign Secretary William Hague with UAE Minister of Foreign Affairs Abdullah bin Zayed Al Nahyan in London, 1 May 2013

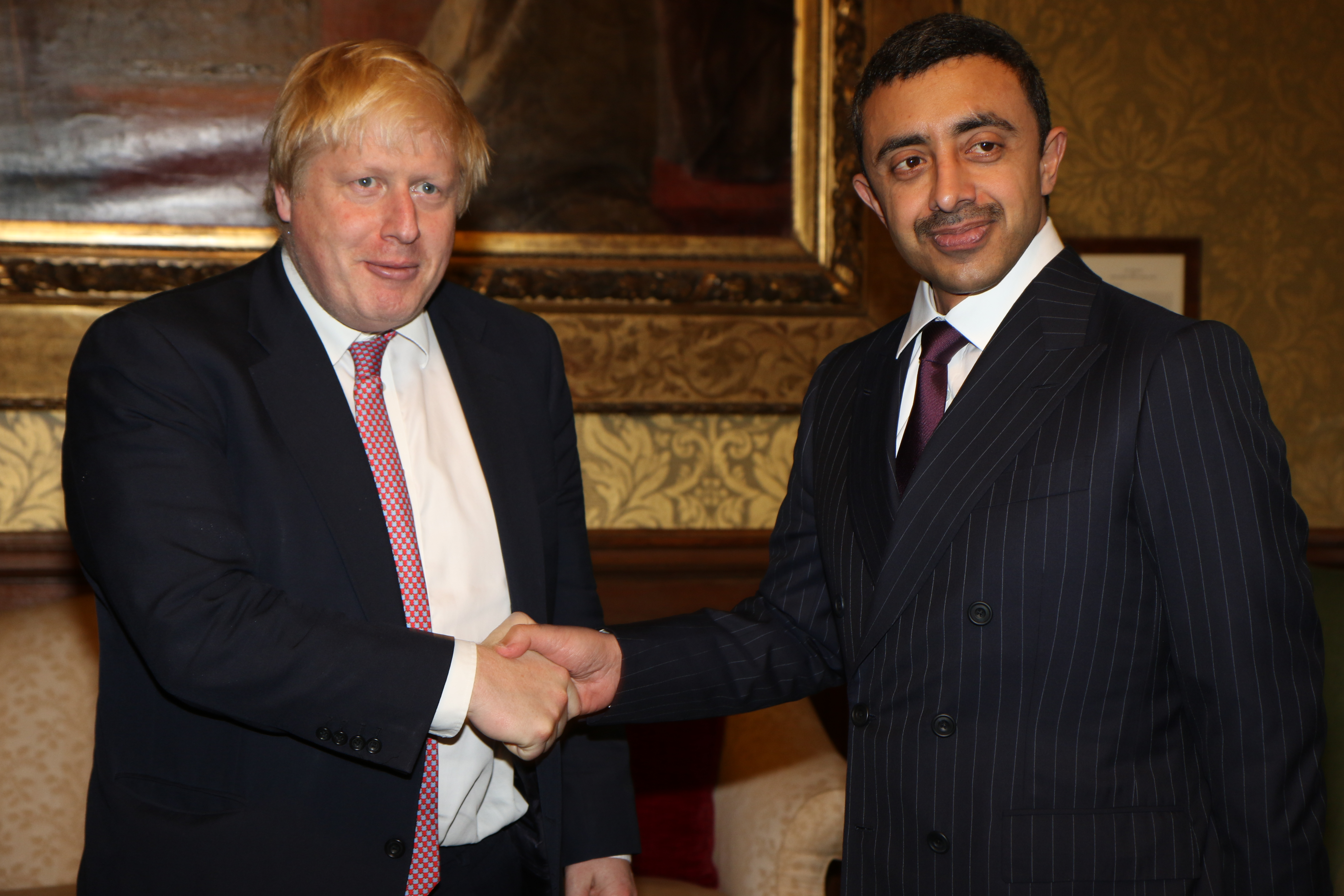
Foreign Secretary Boris Johnson with UAE Foreign Minister Abdullah bin Zayed Al Nahyan in London, 27 October 2016

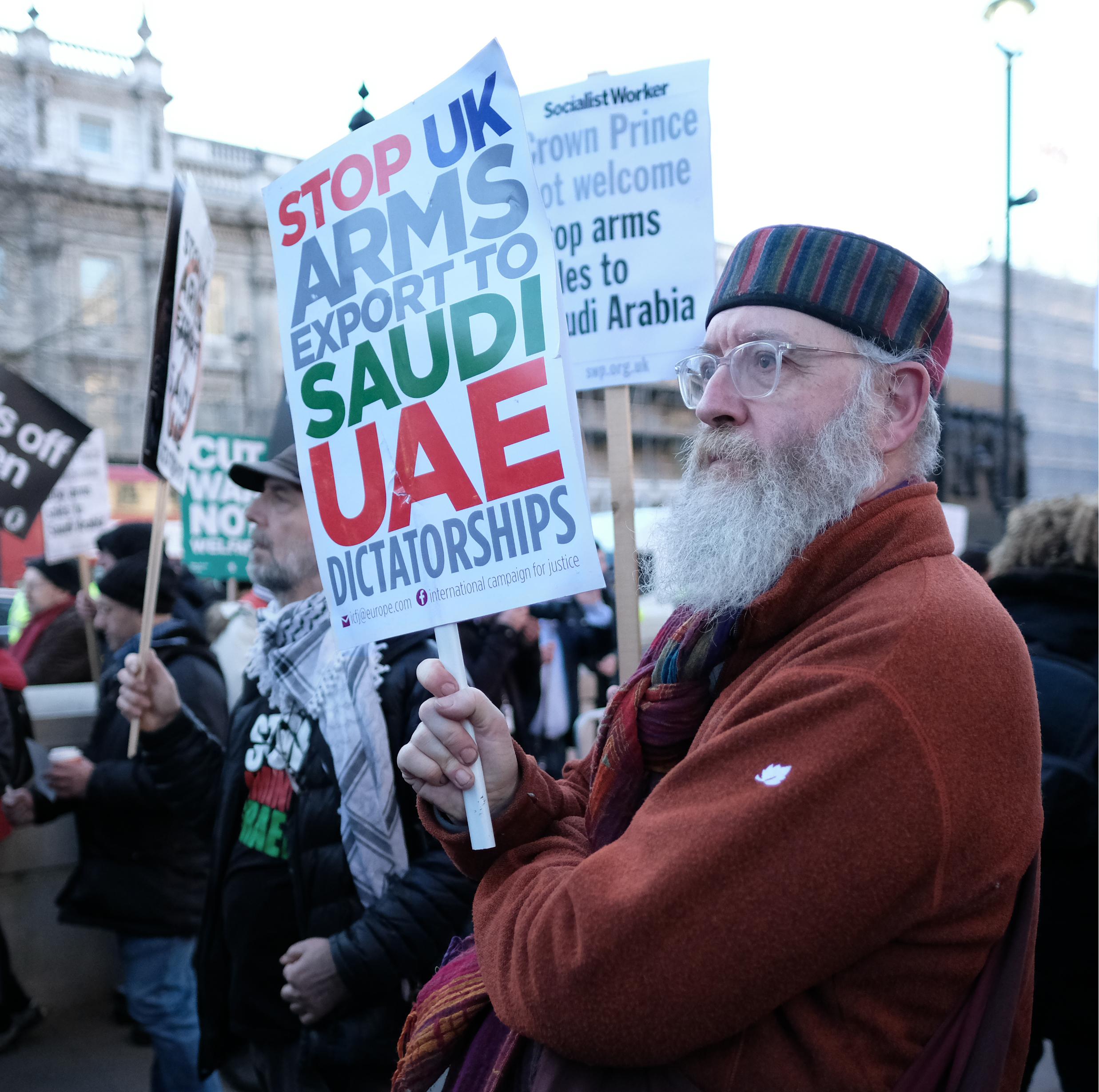
A 2018 protest against arms exports to Saudi Arabia and the United Arab Emirates

In February 2023, the Premier League concluded a four-year investigation, alleging that Manchester City F.C. breached over 100 of its regulations on various occasions between 2009–18, since being acquired by Abu Dhabi’s ruling family. The violations included providing misleading financial information. City was also alleged to have committed an additional 30 breaches related to its failure to comply with the Premier League investigation since December 2018. In September 2023, The Athletic reported that the UK embassy in Abu Dhabi and the Foreign, Commonwealth and Development Office (FCDO) in London discussed these charges against Manchester City. However, the British government refused to disclose the correspondence, saying that it would jeopardize the British bilateral ties with the UAE. Political leaders in Manchester were also condemned for not using their positions to criticize the human rights in the UAE and instead enabling its sportswashing agenda. Following the City’s takeover by Abu Dhabi in 2008, the UK government increased the Emirates’ investment in Manchester. In 2013, the “Project Falcon,” a team of 10 officials, was established to provide the UAE with privileged access to the British political elite, the NHS, globally renowned institutions, and prime land deals. The following year, the Manchester City Council signed a 10-year joint partnership with the Abu Dhabi United Group (ADUG) to build 6,000 new homes.

In October 2023, the UK government faced pressure to investigate Sheikh Mansour bin Zayed Al Nahyan's involvement with Russians. Sheikh Mansour was allegedly helping wealthy Russians move their assets to the UAE and evade international sanctions. If the allegations against Sheikh Mansour were correct, under Premier League rules, his disqualification was possible as the owner of Manchester City. During an April 2024 meeting hosted on the Sudan war by the UN Security Council at the UK’s plea, Sudan’s representative accused the UAE of supporting the Rapid Support Forces. The accusations were denied by the Emirates, which later cancelled meetings with Lord Mayor Michael Mainelli and other British ministers that were scheduled to discuss green finance. Meanwhile, an invitation to Andrew Griffith to visit the UAE for a discussion over space cooperation was also cancelled. The diplomatic issues started after the UK began putting pressure on the Emirates to stop supporting the RSF. A total of four ministerial meetings were cancelled. Sir Brandon Lewis said it was a cause for serious concern, and that the relations with the Emirates were damaged after The Telegraph’s UAE-backed takeover deal was blocked. He said the MPs who opposed the deal attempted to carefully emphasize that “the UK valued the partnership with the United Arab Emirates and would still be keen for inward investment,” and certainly “that is not how the Emiratis perceived it.” Sir Brandon also emphasized the need to improve relations with the UAE, either as a Gulf ally or as a source of inward investment.

In May 2024, Oliver Dowden visited the UAE in an attempt to reassure the UAE of the country's diplomatic significance to the UK. Ahead of the 2024 general elections, the bilateral relations slowed after the UK government blocked the UAE-backed bid to acquire The Telegraph and alleged that the Emirates were supporting Sudan’s Rapid Support Forces (RSF).

In June 2024, sources claimed that the Foreign Office officials attempted to discourage condemnation of the UAE over its role in supplying arms to the RSF militia during the Sudanese civil war by putting pressure on African diplomats not to criticize the Emirates. As per a senior legal counsel at the Raoul Wallenberg Centre for Human Rights, Yonah Diamond, the UK was persuading some states during the informal talks in Ethiopia not to criticize the UAE. Leader of the Darfur Diaspora Association, Abdallah Idriss Abugarda, also accused the FCDO of prioritizing its relationship with the UAE, without caring about its moral obligation. The accusations were strongly denied by the FCDO, with a spokesperson telling the Guardian: “These accusations are categorically untrue. The UK is using its diplomatic influence to support efforts for a durable peace.”

In late 2025, Starmer’s government faced intensifying parliamentary and public pressure to suspend arms sales to the United Arab Emirates following reports that British-made military equipment was being diverted to the Rapid Support Forces (RSF) in Sudan. In October 2025, a United Nations Security Council investigation found that British military equipment had been deployed by the RSF during their siege and subsequent capture of El Fasher, North Darfur. The fall of the city followed an 18-month siege and immediately resulted in a large-scale massacre of civilians, characterized by humanitarian experts as one of the worst war crimes of the Sudanese civil war. Foreign Secretary Yvette Cooper has declined to commit to halting British arms exports to the UAE, instead focusing on diplomatic pressure and humanitarian aid.

== Inward visits ==
In November 2010, Her Majesty Queen Elizabeth II made an historic visit to His Highness Sheikh Khalifa bin Zayed Al Nahyan, President of the UAE and Ruler of Abu Dhabi, her first since 1979, when she also visited Sheikh Rashid Bin Saeed Al Maktoum, Vice-President and Prime Minister of the UAE and Ruler of Dubai. During the 1979 visit, she opened several ports and buildings, including the Dubai World Trade Center, Dubai Municipality, and Port Rashid. On her second visit in 2010, The Queen spent 2 days touring the Zayed Museum and visiting dignitaries of the Ruling Family, whilst her Secretary of State for Foreign & Commonwealth Affairs (The Rt. Hon. William Hague) signed the Abu Dhabi Declaration 2010 with His Highness Sheikh Abdullah Bin Zayed Al Nahyan, UAE Minister of Foreign Affairs, reaffirming the 1971 friendship treaty between the two nations. His Royal Highness the Duke of Edinburgh also signed a Memorandum of Understanding in his capacity as Chancellor of the University of Cambridge with His Highness Sheikh Nahyan Bin Mubarak Al Nahyan, Minister of Education of the UAE. In 2013, President Sheikh Khalifa bin Zayed Al Nahyan visited the UK for the first time, marking the second visit by a UAE president since Sheikh Zayed's visit in 1989.

== Cultural ties ==
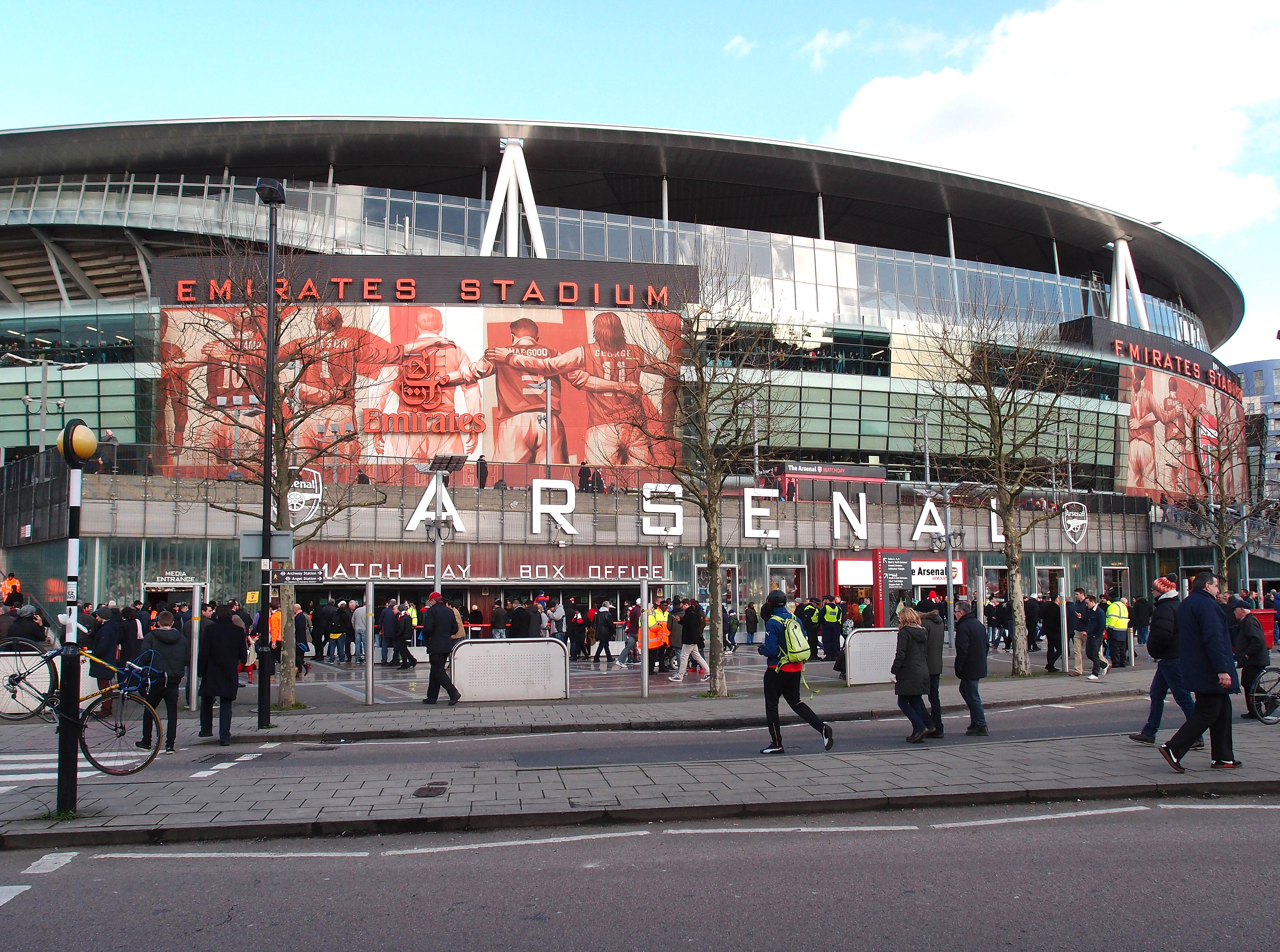
Emirates Stadium in London, 2016

Abu Dhabi and London enjoy strong social and cultural ties, which stretch back to the country's founding in 1971. There are strong educational ties between the UK and the UAE. Lots of British-accredited universities have been in the UAE, including Heriot-Watt University Dubai, University of Birmingham Dubai, Middlesex University Dubai, Herriot-Watt University, Strathclyde University, London Business School and British University, along with Bolton University and Stirling University campuses in Ras Al-Khaimah. The British Council collaborates with a variety of organizations across the Emirates. Their Cultural Excellence Fellowship program with Abu Dhabi Music & Arts brings together Emirati talent across the creative and cultural industries with leaders from the UK.

== Economic ties ==
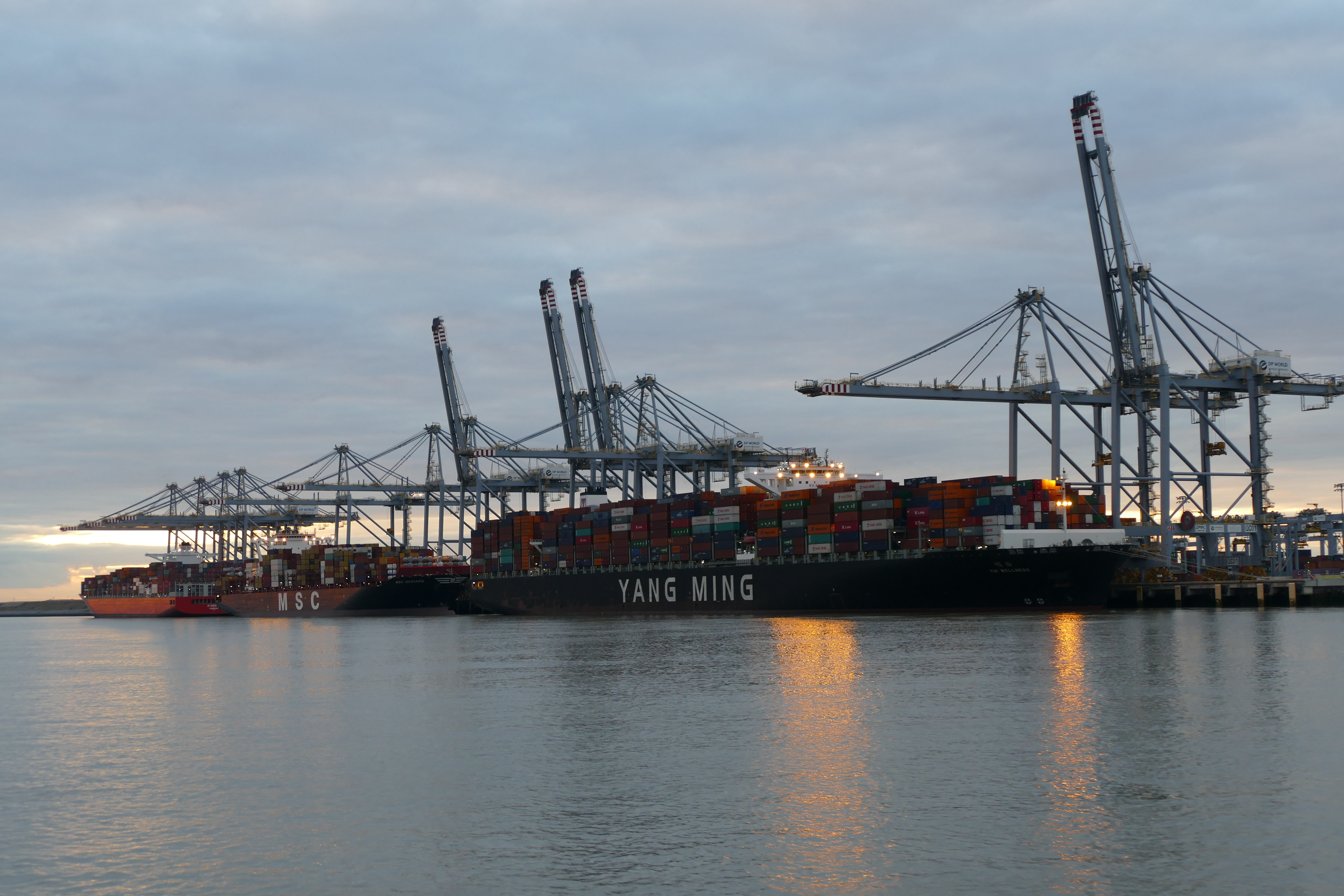
London Gateway is a deepwater port and logistics park in the UK, wholly owned and operated by Dubai's DP World

More than 130,000 British citizens reside in the UAE, with the majority living in Dubai, where they are engaged in business throughout the country. Besides this, each country consistently maintains high rates of mutual trade and investment. The UAE is the UK’s largest trading partner in the region and its 19th largest trading partner globally. In 2024, bilateral trade exceeded £24 billion. In September 2021, the United Arab Emirates pledged to invest £10bn (US $12.83 bn) in the UK for the fields of clean energy, technology, and infrastructure.

On 5 October 2004, Arsenal FC signed a record-breaking £100 million partnership deal with the airline Emirates, which included a 15-year stadium naming rights agreement for their new 60,000-seater home, the Emirates Stadium.

Documents released by the US Department of Justice show that American financier Jeffrey Epstein acted as an intermediary to help UAE's DP World CEO Sultan Ahmed bin Sulayem lobby the UK government in 2009 for support regarding the £1.8 billion London Gateway port project. Epstein reportedly shared the personal email address of Peter Mandelson—who was then the UK Business Secretary—with bin Sulayem and advised him on how to push through a deal. Emails indicate Epstein told Mandelson to "be nice to Sultan" in October 2009. The lobbying effort was aimed at securing government loan guarantees for the DP World deep-water port project on the Thames in Essex. The project went ahead, and DP World currently runs the London Gateway port.

In 2022, the United Kingdom and the Gulf Cooperation Council, of which the United Arab Emirates is a member, initiated negotiations for the Gulf Cooperation Council–United Kingdom Free Trade Agreement, one of the first post-Brexit trade agreements negotiated by the UK.

Keir Starmer's government has significantly expanded economic and military ties with Gulf Cooperation Council (GCC) nations, primarily focusing on securing infrastructure investment and finalizing a region-wide free trade agreement. Starmer defended the engagement with these leaders—despite human rights concerns—as necessary for both British security and jobs. In early December 2024, Starmer conducted a multi-day diplomatic visit to the Gulf, meeting with Sheikh Mohamed bin Zayed Al Nahyan in the UAE.

== Political ties ==
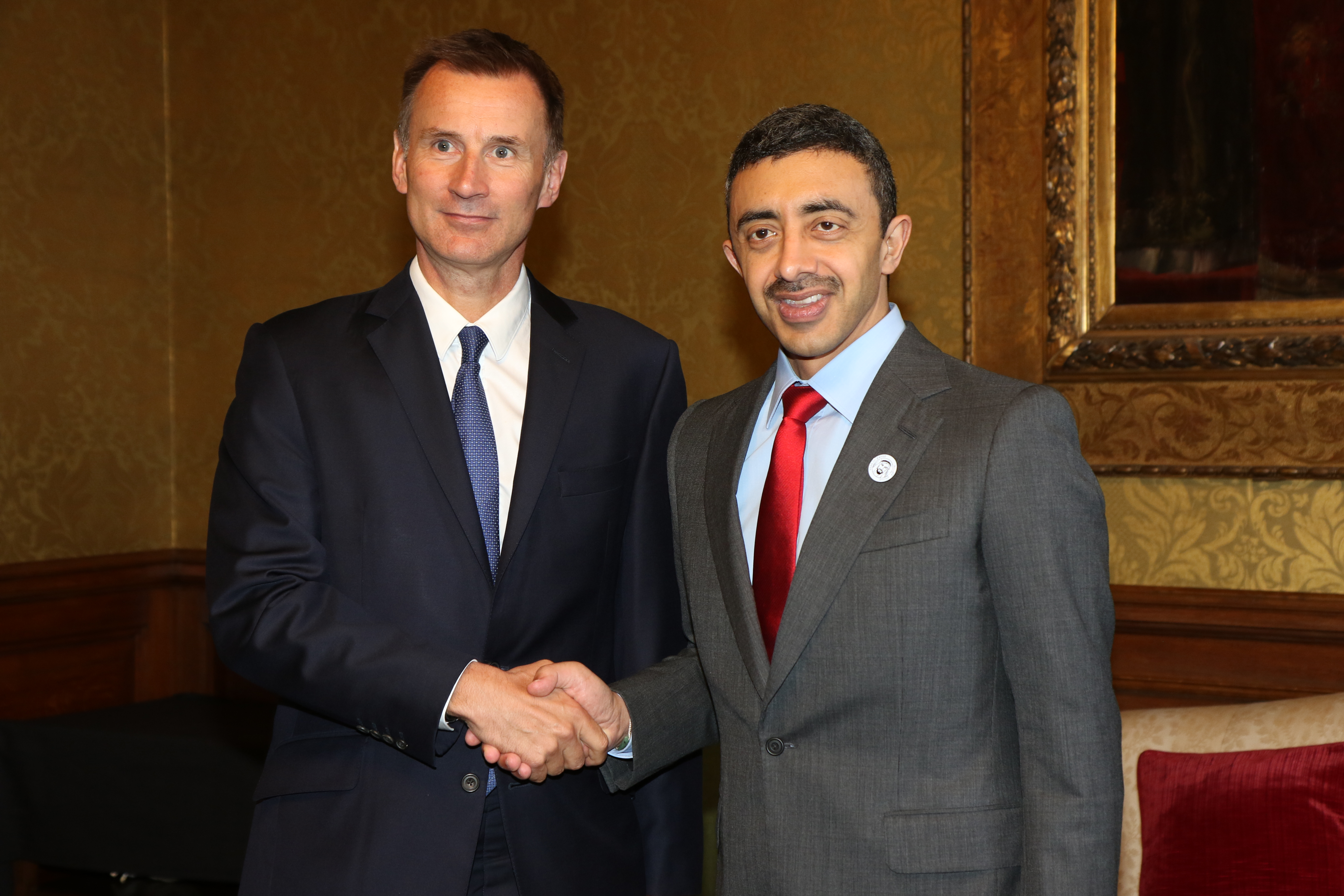
British Foreign Secretary Jeremy Hunt meeting United Arab Emirates Minister of Foreign Affairs Abdullah bin Zayed Al Nahyan in London on 6 September 2018.

Both Britain and the Emirates have established relations in various areas, including law enforcement, defence, training, and military technology. This was reflected recently in the signing of an agreement to cooperate in the development of the Emirates' nuclear energy plants in the future.

In November 2018, the United Kingdom's foreign minister, Jeremy Hunt, threatened the UAE with "serious diplomatic consequences" after it sentenced a British academic, Matthew Hedges, to life in prison for allegedly spying for the UK government. Princess Haya bin Hussein, a Jordanian princess, was also married to Sheikh Mohammed, the Emir of Dubai. She fled with their two children to the United Kingdom in 2019, and their marriage ended. A British Court ordered Sheikh Mohammed to pay funds for the Princess. One of Sheikh Mohammed's daughters, Sheikha Shamsa, was taken back to the UAE, and the British local police did not want to investigate this matter anymore.

In 2022, the heads of both countries died. In May, Sheikh Khalifa died at the age of 73. In September, Queen Elizabeth II died at the age of 96. The UAE announced a three-day mourning period. Following the Labour Party's victory in the 2024 general election, UK Foreign Secretary David Lammy's first call was to his Emirati counterpart, Sheikh Abdullah bin Zayed Al Nahyan, underlining the importance of the bilateral relationship. Shortly after being elected to government, Prime Minister Keir Starmer had a call with President Sheikh Mohamed. In a post-election interview, the British ambassador said energy and growth were two particularly relevant areas in the UK's relationship with the UAE.

== People ==
Well-known Britons include Edward Henderson, who wrote a book titled "Arabian Destiny" about his career in the region after World War II, where he developed oil concessions and gained insight into local politics, both within and beyond his role in the Foreign and Commonwealth Office. Uniquely, upon his retirement, he was invited to assist in establishing the national archives in Abu Dhabi by His Highness Sheikh Zayed Bin Sultan Al Nahyan, the founding President of the UAE from 1971 and Ruler of Abu Dhabi before that. Other well-known authors with experience of the Emirates include Shirley Kay, "Mother Without a Mask", Jeremy Williams OBE, "Don't They Know It's Friday?" and Mary Gene Saudelli, “The Balancing Act: International Higher Education in the 21st Century,” which chronicles higher education for Emirati women.

An 18th-century masterpiece painting, titled ‘Mary Magdalene in Ecstasy’, was gifted to the UAE by the United Kingdom as a token of goodwill and a symbol of enduring friendship between both countries in July 2019. The painting was painted by Ary Scheffer in 1856 and is part of the Lubin Family Private Collection. The British Ambassador presented the painting to the UAE, Patrick Moody, to Dr Hamed bin Mohamed Al Suwaidi, the chairman of Abu Dhabi Arts Society. Dr. Al Suwaidi suggested that the painting may be showcased at the Louvre Abu Dhabi.

== Resident diplomatic missions ==
- The United Arab Emirates has an embassy in London.
- the United Kingdom has an embassy in Abu Dhabi and a consulate-general in Dubai.

== See also ==
- Britons in the United Arab Emirates
- Emiratis in the United Kingdom
- Foreign relations of the United Kingdom
- Gulf Cooperation Council–United Kingdom Free Trade Agreement
