= Kensington Road =

Section of road in London, England

Coordinates: 51°30′6.6″N 0°10′22″W

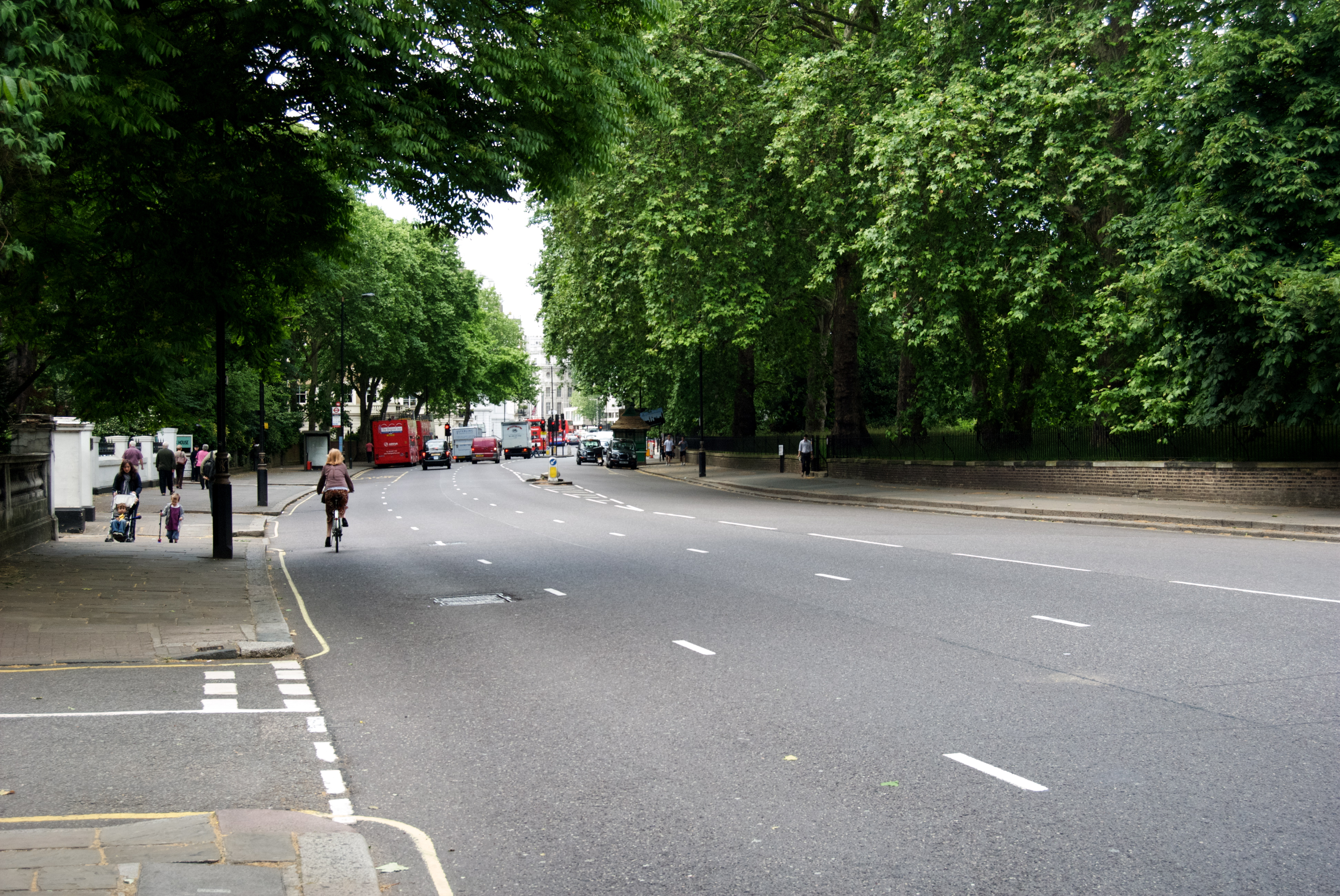
Kensington Road from the Royal Albert Hall, looking west.

Kensington Road is a section of road in the Royal Borough of Kensington and Chelsea and the City of Westminster, London, forming part of the A315 road.

== Location and description ==
It runs along the south edge of Kensington Gardens and Hyde Park in the West End of London. To the west it becomes Kensington High Street, to the east it becomes Knightsbridge, while Kensington Gore is the name applied to the middle section. To the north is Kensington Palace and to the south, the road is joined by Palace Gate, Queen's Gate, Exhibition Road, and Rutland Gate (west to east).

== Features and transport ==
Kensington Road houses one of the remaining thirteen Grade II listed Cabmen's Shelters used by London's taxi drivers as a place to buy food and (non-alcoholic) drink.

The London bus routes 9, 52, 360 and 452 serve Kensington Road.

== Prince's Gate ==
Running adjacent to Kensington Road on the south side, separated by a high wall, is Prince's Gate. It was named after a gate into Hyde Park, opened in 1848 by Edward VII, the then Prince of Wales. In 1855 some stuccoed terraces were built opposite it, facing Kensington Road. They were described by Leigh Hunt as like "a set of tall, thin gentlemen squeezing together to look at something over the way". Many of the individual properties are now embassies or offices. Notable ones include:

- The Embassy of Iran, 16 Prince's Gate
- The Embassy of Ethiopia, 17 Prince's Gate
- The Polish Institute and Sikorski Museum, 20 Prince's Gate
- The Embassy of Thailand (branch), 28 Prince's Gate
- The Embassy of Tunisia, 29 Prince's Gate
- The Embassy of the United Arab Emirates, 30 Prince's Gate
- The Embassy of Afghanistan, 31 Prince's Gate (entrance in Exhibition Road)

== Notable residents ==
Several notable people lived in Prince's Gate too. Field Marshal Douglas Haig lived and died at No. 21 in 1928; Robert Baden-Powell lived at No. 32 in 1903–14; and Joseph Chamberlain lived at No. 72 in 1880–2. No. 14 was the home of Joseph Kennedy when he was the American ambassador to Britain in 1937–40, accompanied by his son John F. Kennedy.

== See also ==
- Cabmen's Shelter Fund
- 14 Prince's Gate, London
