= 14 Prince's Gate, London =

Building in Kensington Road, Westminster, London

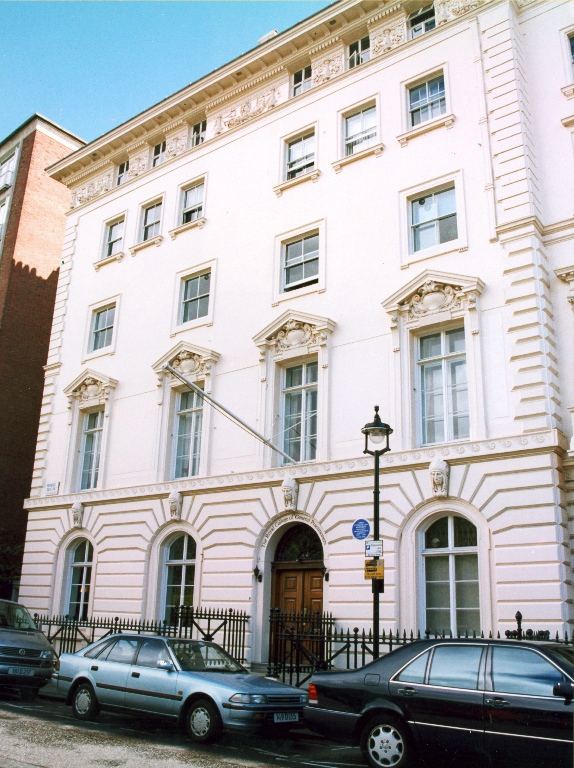
- Interactive map of 14 Prince's Gate, London
- 51.5015°N 0.172°W
- Location: Kensington Road, Westminster, London, England
- OS grid reference: TQ 269 796

History
- Built: 1849

Site notes
- Architect: Harvey Lonsdale Elmes

Listed Building – Grade II
- Designated: 5 February 1970
- Reference no.: 1265482

14 Prince's Gate is the building at the east end of a terrace overlooking Hyde Park in Kensington Road, Westminster, London. The whole terrace is recorded in the National Heritage List for England as a designated Grade II listed building. The terrace is called Prince's Gate because it stands opposite the Prince of Wales' Gate to Hyde Park, named after the Prince of Wales who later became Edward VII.

Built in 1849, its owners included members of the Morgan family of American bankers. Number 13 and 14 Prince's Gate were combined into an enlarged Number 14 in the early 20th century. From the 1920s to the 1950s it was the official residence of eight American ambassadors. It later became the first headquarters of the Independent Television Authority and was until 2010 the headquarters of the Royal College of General Practitioners, when it returned to being a private home.

== History ==
=== Early history ===
The terrace containing 13 and 14 Prince's Gate was completed in 1849. It was designed by Harvey Lonsdale Elmes and built by John Kelk. Shortly after completion of the terrace, the Crystal Palace was built opposite in Hyde Park to house the Great Exhibition of 1851. The first owner of No. 13 was George Baker, a building contractor. No. 14 was leased and then owned by John Pearce, but he did not live there. The first resident, from 1852, was Edward Wyndham Harrington Schenley, a former soldier, who later bought the freehold.

In 1854 No. 13 was rented by the American banker Junius Spencer Morgan, who bought the house at some time between 1857 and 1859. On his death in 1890 his son, John Pierpont Morgan, inherited the house. Pierpont Morgan spent up to three months every year in London, either in Prince's Gate or at Dover House, in Putney. He was a collector of great art, paintings, books, and many other objects, most of which were kept at Prince's Gate. By 1900 the collection was too big to be contained in the house and part of it was loaned to the Victoria and Albert Museum. His collection of paintings included works by Reynolds, Gainsborough, Romney, Constable, Van Dyke, Rembrandt, Frans Hals, Fragonard, Velázquez and Holbein. For the nine months of the year that Pierpont Morgan was away from London, the house was cared for by his housekeeper. In 1904, he paid £30,000 to purchase the freehold of the house next door, No. 14 Prince's Gate, from Schenley's widow, Mary, and amalgamated it with No. 13. The conjoined house was numbered 14. Its external appearance remained that of two separate houses, but internally structural alterations were made. These included the replacement of No. 14's principal staircase by an octagonal hall, and the creation of a lobby with marble columns on the floor above. Pierpont Morgan died in 1913 and the house was inherited by his son, John Pierpont Morgan Junior. The latter never lived in the house and in the First World War he loaned it to the Council of War Relief for the Professional Classes, who used it as a maternity home.

=== Home of American ambassadors ===
After the war the house was offered to the American Government as a home for their ambassadors and this offer was accepted in 1921. The house was first used for this purpose in 1929, and this use continued with one interval until 1955. The ordinary business of the delegation was not conducted at the house, but at the Embassy chancery then located in Grosvenor Square. The American architect Thomas Hastings was employed to refurbish the building and remodel the façade. As part of this he added images of the heads of Native Americans in the keystones of the arches over the ground floor windows. Hastings transformed the façade in Beaux-Arts style and added a grand staircase. He also modified rooms on the lower two floors to make them more suitable for entertaining.

Eight ambassadors lived in the house. The first of these was Charles Gates Dawes, who lived there from 1929 to 1932. The Dawes Plan was named after him and he was awarded the Nobel Peace Prize. Before he moved to London he was Vice President of the United States. He was succeeded for a short time in 1932 by the banker Andrew Mellon. Like John Pierpont Morgan, Mellon was a major art collector and for a time his collection was housed at Prince's Gate. Mellon was followed by Robert Worth Bingham who served until 1937; he was the ambassador who had the longest residence in the house.

Next came Joseph P. Kennedy, father of the future President of the United States, John F. Kennedy. During the Second World War, the ambassador was John Winant, although he did not live in the house, which remained vacant throughout the war. Winant resigned in 1946 and the following year was succeeded by Lewis Douglas, who lived in the house until 1950. The next ambassador was Walter Gifford who served until 1953 when he was succeeded by Winthrop Aldrich. By 1955 a large block of flats had been built next to the house that overlooked and dominated its terrace and the garden behind it. This was considered to be a security risk so the house was sold and the American ambassadors moved to Winfield House.

=== More recent history ===
The house was bought by the Independent Television Authority in July 1955 who used it as their headquarters for six years. They moved out in 1961 when it had become too small for their needs and the house was empty for a year. In July 1962 the Royal College of General Practitioners bought the freehold of the house for £175,000 (£3.27 million as of 2025) to develop it into their headquarters. In 1976 the business of the college was extended next door into No. 15 Prince's Gate. In 1992 the college obtained the freehold of No. 15. The college sold the building in 2010 and moved its headquarters to Euston Square.

The work of the college was disrupted on the morning of 30 April 1980 with the onset of the Iranian Embassy Siege. The embassy was next to the college at 16 Prince's Gate. The college was evacuated, except for two administrators who were retired naval officers. The siege lasted for five days. Rooms in the college were used by the Special Air Service to plan its attack which ended the siege.

== Architecture ==
Like the buildings at the other end, no.14 is slightly set forward from the rest of the terrace. All the houses in the terrace have five storeys and a basement, and all are stuccoed. As first built, Nos. 13 and 14 were similar houses. Like the rest of the terrace, each had a projecting porch with Ionic columns. To the left of these were two windows. The first floor had a balustraded balcony and three windows over which was a cornice with a central pediment. This was changed by Hastings' remodelling of the façade. The house as a whole now has four bays with rusticated quoins on both corners. On the ground floor, from the east there are two round-headed windows, then the entrance door with a round arch, and then another round-headed window. The keystone of each of these arches bears the image of a Native American. All the other windows in the building are square-headed. The porches and first-floor balconies were removed in Hastings' remodelling. The first floor has four windows; over each of these is a pediment containing decorative plasterwork. The second floor has four windows, while the third floor has six windows. The top floor also has six windows, with decorative plasterwork between them, and over these is a cornice. As such, it included offices, a library, a museum, rooms for meetings and conferences, and residential accommodation for officers and members of the College. Behind the building is an enclosed garden, formed by the terrace in Prince's Gate and other terraces, in a similar fashion to other London squares. In 2010 the College sold the building to a private overseas family fund "for an undisclosed fee".
