= Qatar–United Kingdom relations =

- Qatar: United Kingdom

Qatar–United Kingdom relations (Arabic: العلاقات البريطانية القطرية, romanized: al-ʻAlāqāt al-Barīṭānīyah al-Qaṭarīyah are the bilateral relations between the State of Qatar and the United Kingdom of Great Britain and Northern Ireland, covering a wide range of issues and activities of mutual interest.

== History ==
In 1868, British Lieutenant General and East India Company officer Sir Lewis Pelly arrived in Bahrain to protect British interests through the enforcement of the earlier Perpetual Maritime Truce of 1853 following a number of raids by members of tribes in the region. Pelly believed these raids had been orchestrated by the ruler of Bahrain and he resolved the situation by insisting that the rulers of Qatar, Bahrain and Abu Dhabi sign declarations to affirm their commitment to the truce. The Qatari declaration, which was signed by Mohammed bin Thani, principal ruler of the Qatari tribes, was the first recognition of Qatar as independent from Bahrain. Ultimately this treaty became the starting point for the British government’s recognition of Qatar as an independent sovereign state.

The Ottomans officially renounced sovereignty over Qatar in 1913. The new ruler Abdullah bin Jassim Al Thani signed a treaty with Britain in 1916, thereby instating the area under the trucial system. This meant that Qatar relinquished its autonomy in foreign affairs, such as the power to cede territory, and other affairs, in exchange for Britain's military protection from external threats.

Initially, the British were reluctant to involve themselves in inland affairs. However, when oil was discovered in the area in the 1930s, the race for oil concessions intensified. In 1938, the Anglo-Persian Oil Company began drilling its first well in Dukhan and a year later, the well-struck oil.

In June 2023, the UK announced Qatari citizens will no longer have to apply for a visa to enter the UK, but will be able to obtain an online ETA permit for £10, starting in October 2023.

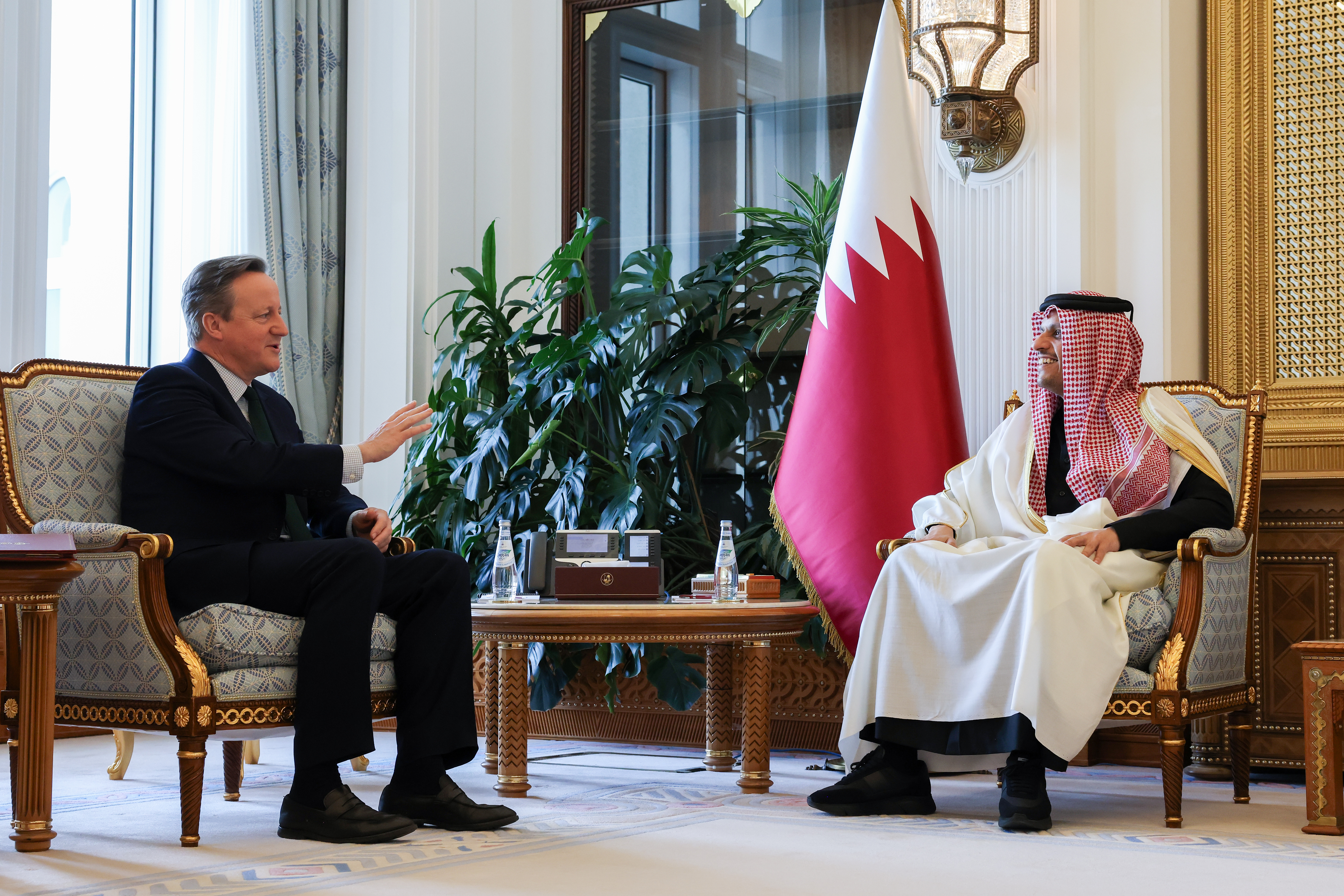
UK’s Foreign Secretary David Cameron with Qatar’s Prime Ministe Mohammed bin Abdulrahman bin Jassim Al Thani, 25 January 2024

In July 2023, the UK’s Foreign Secretary James Cleverly visited Doha and held talks with Prime Minister and Minister of Foreign Affairs Sheikh Mohammed bin Abdulrahman Al Thani. They discussed regional issues and closer cooperation on security, defense and economy.

== Diplomatic representation ==
Bilateral relations between the two countries have expanded since the opening of the British embassy in Doha in 1949, marked by the arrival of British Political Officer John Wilton. The embassy’s mandate is to develop and maintain relations between the United Kingdom and Qatar, dealing with a range of political, commercial, security and economic questions of interest to both countries. The current UK ambassador to Qatar is Neerav Patel.

Qatar has had an embassy in London since 1970, based in Mayfair. The current Qatari ambassador to the UK is Fahad Mohammed Al-Attiyah.

On November 6, 2024, King Charles III of the United Kingdom received the credentials of Sheikh Abdullah bin Mohammed bin Saud Al-Thani as the Ambassador Extraordinary and Plenipotentiary of Qatar to the United Kingdom. The ambassador conveyed the greetings and well-wishes of the Amir of Qatar, Sheikh Tamim bin Hamad Al-Thani. In return, King Charles III extended his greetings and best wishes to the Amir and expressed hopes for continued progress and prosperity for Qatar.

== Diplomatic visits ==
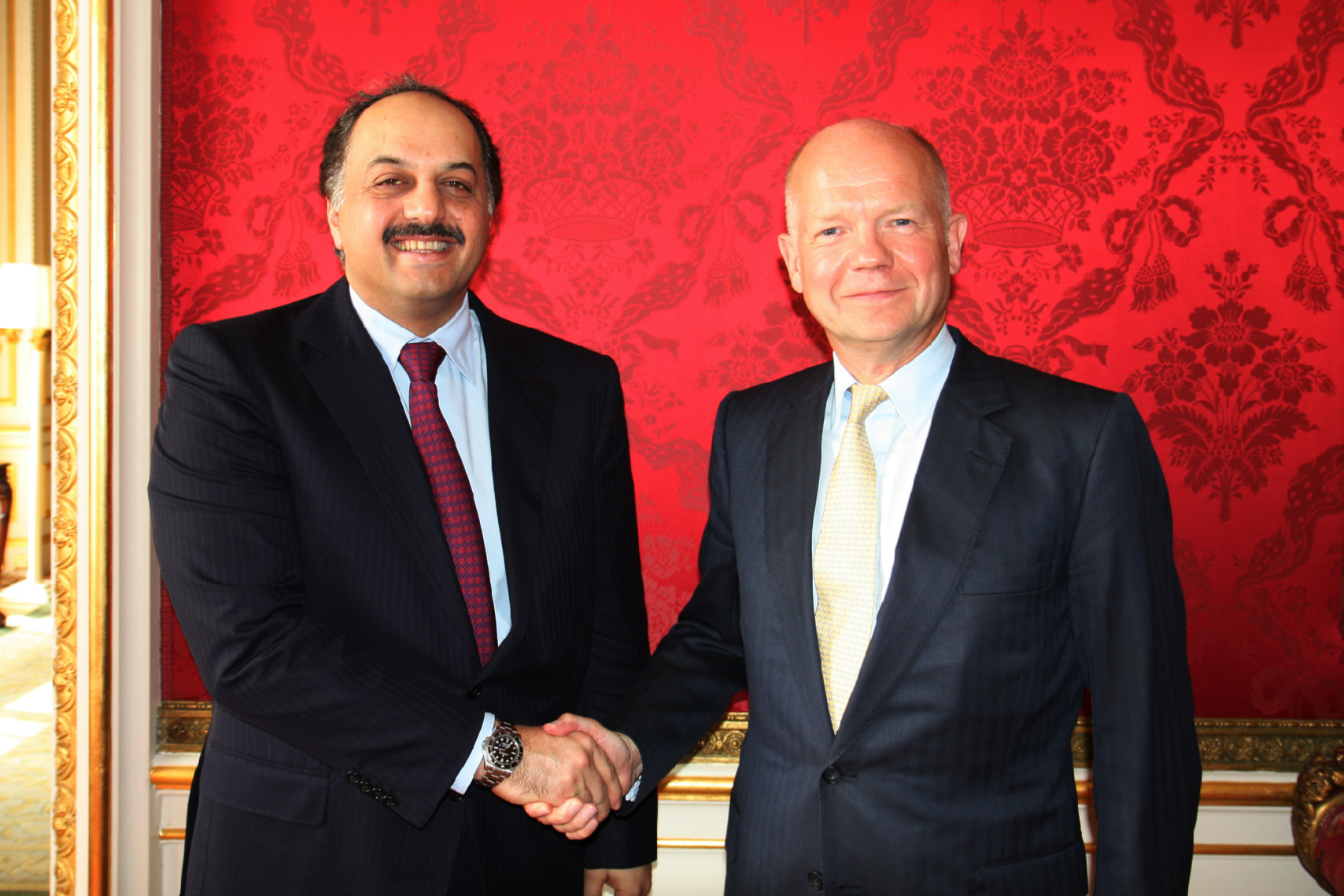
Foreign secretary William Hague and foreign minister Khalid Al Attiyah in London in 2013.

UK Prime Minister David Cameron visited Qatar in 2011, and the then Emir of Qatar made a 3-day state visit in October 2010.

The current Emir of Qatar made a state visit to the UK in October 2014.

In March 2013, Prince Charles and his wife the Duchess of Cornwall, arrived in Qatar for a state visit.

On 20 September 2019, British Prime Minister Boris Johnson hosted Sheikh Tamim bin Hamad Al Thani at the Downing Street. Johnson pressed over the fact that the UK’s relation with Qatar is going from “strength to strength”.

On 24 May 2022, Sheikh Tamim met with Prime Minister Boris Johnson to celebrate the 50th anniversary of the UK-Qatar bilateral relations in London.

In early May 2023, Sheikh Tamim was invited to the coronation of Charles III and Camilla. During the visit, Sheikh Tamim met with Prime Minister Rishi Sunak, discussing the Russian invasion of Ukraine, the 2022 FIFA World Cup, and furthering the strategic relations between the countries. In November 2024, Sheikh Tamim paid a state visit to the United Kingdom and was received by King Charles III.

== Diplomatic cooperation ==
=== Military ===
During Operation Herrick in Afghanistan and Operation Telic in Iraq, the Royal Air Force stationed forces at Al Udeid Air Base in Qatar. After these forces withdrew, the airbase became home to No. 83 Expeditionary Air Group, the RAF's headquarters for military operations in the Middle East. Since 2014, the airbase has supported Operation Shader, the UK's intervention against ISIS in Iraq and Syria. It has also hosted RAF Boeing RC-135 reconnaissance aircraft in support of this operation.

The UK and Qatar signed a Defence Cooperation Agreement in November 2014.

In February 2014, the Royal Navy warship HMS Monmouth hosted NATO delegates in the port of Doha in Qatar.

Qatari cadets attend the Royal Military Academy Sandhurst each year, and the current Emir of Qatar, Sheikh Tamim bin Hamad Al Thani, is a Sandhurst graduate.

British military also provide officer training to Qatari forces in Qatar.

In 2018, the two countries' air forces formed a joint squadron of Eurofighter Typhoons, named No. 12 Squadron RAF, based at RAF Coningsby in England. It was the UK's first joint squadron since World War II. It became operational in December 2020 and was followed by a second joint squadron consisting of BAE Systems Hawk advanced training jets, in addition to RAF aerial refueling support. The UK government announced in April 2021 that it has increased the number of flying hours for RAF pilots and has also invested in new training facilities and infrastructure at RAF Leeming. The success of the 12 Squadron served as an idol for their relationship, which improved Qatar's capacity to address Middle East security issues, promote regional stability, and safeguard UK security. Defense Secretary Ben Wallace said in his statement, “In order to face off new and emerging threats, it is vital we collaborate with our international allies to tackle our shared security challenges and our long-standing relationship with Qatar exemplifies this. By working together, we continue to share skills and expertise whilst promoting global security and driving prosperity at home. I'm delighted RAF Leeming has been chosen to base the historic second UK-Qatari joint squadron, which recognizes the globally-held high regard of RAF flying training.” Dr Khalid bin Mohamed Al Attiyah, Deputy Prime Minister and Minister of State for Defense Affairs in Qatar added that “An important step in the ever-growing military partnership that joins QEAF and RAF, the joint Hawk training squadron is an integral component in increasing interoperability and coordination between both air forces, leading to closer cooperation and alignment in future military and peacekeeping efforts.”

During the state visit of the Amir of Qatar to the United Kingdom in December 2024, the UK and Qatar signed agreements to enhance their defence cooperation. The agreements included expanding collaboration within the joint UK-Qatar Typhoon and Hawk squadrons and knowledge-sharing between the UK Royal Military Police and Qatar’s Amiri Guard Close Protection Unit. The visit took place at the Royal Military Academy Sandhurst, where the Amir, a graduate of the academy, met Qatari cadets and witnessed a fly-past by RAF Typhoon and Hawk aircraft.

=== Business and investment ===
UK Trade and Investment (UKTI) helps UK-based businesses expand in Qatar whilst also aiding Qatari businesses locate and expand in the UK. For example, the Lord Mayor of the City of London Alderman Alan Yarrow visited Qatar on 27 January 2015 to improve professional and financial services ties between the two counties, as well as to establish the new British Chamber of Commerce in Doha (housed in the headquarters of HSBC). Trade and investment between UK and Qatar currently stands at £5 billion per year. The UK is the fourth largest exporter to Qatar.

In March 2013, Qatar and the UK began talks to invest up to £10 billion from Qatar into key infrastructure projects in Britain. Among the specific schemes discussed were the new £14 billion nuclear reactor at Hinkley Point in Somerset planned by EDF Energy. Qatar has also since invested in Heathrow Airport, Canary Wharf, Barclays, Sainsbury’s and Harrods.

Additionally, the Qatar British Business Forum, established in 1992, is a membership organization with over 500 British companies based in Qatar.

British-Dutch oil firm Royal Dutch Shell is the second biggest investor in Qatar after ExxonMobil and has stakes in some of Qatar’s LNG production plants, known as trains.

On 19 October 2021, during UK Global Investment Summit, Qatar Energy and Royal Dutch Shell signed an agreement to work together on UK's blue and green hydrogen projects in order to promote decarbonization and help in achieving the UK's target of net-zero carbon emissions.

The UK government has turned to Qatar to seek a long-term gas deal to ensure a stable supply of liquefied natural gas (LNG) to the UK. Prime Minister Boris Johnson asked the current Emir of Qatar, Sheikh Tamim bin Hamad Al Thani, for help during a meeting at the UN General Assembly in September 2021.

In May 2022, the UK and Qatar signed a Strategic Investment Partnership. Qatar pledged to invest up to £10 billion in the UK economy in order to create jobs and to further economic growth.

In 2022, the UK and Qatar shared a trade volume of over £12.1 billion.

On 20 February 2023, the Qatari Deputy Prime Minister and Foreign Affairs Minister Sheikh Mohammed bin Abdulrahman Al Thani and the British Foreign Secretary James Cleverly held the first annual Strategic Dialogue in London.

On 4 December 2024, the two countries announced a new Climate Technology Partnership during Amir of Qatar, Sheikh Tamim bin Hamad Al Thani, State Visit to the UK where he met King Charles III and Prime Minister Keir Starmer. Qatar confirmed an initial investment of £1 billion.

There is pressure to remove Qatar from the One World alliance, see Oneworld internal hostilities.

=== Trade Agreements ===
The UK and the Gulf Cooperation Council, of which Qatar is a member, opened up negotiations for a free trade agreement.

As of the 19 February 2024, six rounds of negotiations have been concluded for the Gulf Cooperation Council–United Kingdom Free Trade Agreement.

=== Educational ties ===
The Qatar Foundation plays an important part in facilitating educational and academic connections; the foundation sponsors Qatari students studying at UK universities, and University College London (UCL) is represented at the Qatar Foundation by UCL Qatar, a branch campus partner of Hamad bin Khalifa University. On a recent official visit to Qatar, the UK’s Minister for Universities and Science, Dr David Willetts MP, spent much time at the foundation, where he highlighted the depth and importance of collaboration between UK institutions and Qatar Foundation.

There are also amicable links between the Centre for Gulf Studies at Qatar University and Cambridge University.

Degrees of the University of Aberdeen have been delivered in Qatar by AFG College since 2017. The College offers Ministry of Education and Higher Education-accredited undergraduate and postgraduate programmes in Business, Law, Communication, Politics and International Relations, Computing Science, and Public Health at its dedicated campus in Doha.

In partnership with the University of Ulster, offers UK accredited courses and programs within Qatar and is licensed by the Ministry of Education and Higher Education. This partnership allowed Qatari and resident students to complete educational programs and obtain UK accredited qualifications without leaving their country of residence.

=== Science, technology and medicine ===
In 2013, the UK set up the UK Science and Innovation Network (SIN) in the Gulf, based in Doha, to support science and innovation partnering in the six countries of the Gulf Cooperation Council. This is in line with Qatar’s plans to spend 2.8% of its national budget annually on research and to invest heavily in infrastructure and programmes to build a knowledge economy.

Some of the two countries’ collaborations in these fields include:

- Shell Oil / QatarEnergy / Imperial College London - Carbonates and Carbon Storage Centre: This is Imperial College London’s largest overseas research investment based in London and based around carbon storage.
- Imperial College London / Hamad Medical Corporation - Qatar Biobank: This project aims to map health indicators of 20% of the Qatari and long-term resident population.
- Imperial College London / Qatar Foundation - Qatar Robotics Surgery Centre: This training and software development centre researches into robotic surgery.
- Magdi Yacoub Heart Foundation / Qatar Foundation: Qatar Cardiovascular Research Centre: This is set to become a regional centre for cardiovascular research.
- The Qatar Foundation / British Library - Qatar Digital Library: This project will digitize, annotate and improve access to the British Library collection of Gulf records and Arab scientific manuscripts.
- Imperial College London Diabetes Centre / Mubadala Healthcare: A partnership aimed at diabetes treatment.

Additionally, Williams F1 was based at the Qatar Science & Technology Park (QSTP) for several years and the two organisations worked on a number of initiatives, including the promotion of road safety campaigns in Qatar.

=== Sport ===
UK Prime Minister David Cameron pledged the UK's support and previous experience from hosting international sporting events to Qatar and its 2022 FIFA World Cup project at a meeting with the Emir of Qatar in October 2014.

Qatar's winning bid was advised by Mike Lee and his communications agency Vero, the same figures behind both London and Rio de Janeiro’s winning Olympics bids in 2012 and 2016 respectively.

Major UK-based construction and architecture firms have won major contracts to prepare Qatar for the 2022 event. Foster and Partners won a contract to design the main stadium that will host the opening and closing ceremonies, while WS Atkins won a £70 million contract to coordinate current and planned road, rail, metro and other major infrastructure projects. Arup Associates was also tasked with designing a new carbon-efficient stadium.

Sheffield F.C., the UK's oldest football club, announced that Qatar had invested £100,000 in the club in September 2015.

=== Arts and culture ===
In 2013, Qatar and the UK instigated the Qatar-UK Year of Culture, a year-long programme of cultural exchange between the two countries. In partnership with the Victoria and Albert Museum and Qatar Museums Authority, numerous art exhibitions were launched including one of the biggest Damien Hirst exhibitions to date in Doha between October 2013 and January 2014.

The British Council has been involved in Qatar since 1972, working in arts, education and social programmes.

In November 2021, the British Council started supporting young activists globally to implement projects that will help tackle climate change challenges to create a greener, more sustainable world.The Qatar Environment Champions programme supports Qatar’s National Vision 2030 to confront the challenges posed by climate change.This programme is funded by the FCDO Gulf Strategy Fund and delivered in partnership with the British Council Qatar.

== Resident diplomatic missions ==
- Qatar has an embassy in London.
- the United Kingdom has an embassy in Doha.

== See also ==
- Foreign relations of Qatar
- Foreign relations of the United Kingdom
