= Gulf Cooperation Council–United Kingdom Free Trade Agreement =

Proposed free trade agreement between the GCC and the UK

- Gulf Cooperation Council United Kingdom
- Type: Free trade agreement
- Context: Trade agreement between Gulf Cooperation Council and the United Kingdom
- Signed: 20 May 2026
- Location: London, United Kingdom
- Negotiators: Fareed bin Saeed Al‑Asaly (United Kingdom) British Trade Ministers: Anne-Marie Trevelyan (until 6 September 2022); Kemi Badenoch (until 5 July 2024); Jonathan Reynolds (until 5 September 2025); Peter Kyle (until 20 May 2026, signed)
- Signatories: Jasem Mohamed Albudaiwi; Sir Chris Bryant
- Parties: Bahrain; Kuwait; Oman; Qatar; Saudi Arabia; United Arab Emirates; United Kingdom
- Languages: Arabic; English

The Gulf Cooperation Council–United Kingdom free trade agreement (GCCUKFTA) is a signed free trade agreement which began negotiations in June 2022. The deal the first free trade agreement between the United Kingdom and the Gulf Cooperation Council, or any of its member states: Bahrain, Kuwait, Oman, Qatar, Saudi Arabia, and the United Arab Emirates. It was the first free trade agreement between the Gulf Cooperation Council and a G7 member.

== Background ==
Following the 2016 Brexit referendum, in which the UK voted to leave the European Union, the Gulf states began pressing the UK Government for a post-Brexit Trade agreement.

British trade with the GCC was worth about £45 billion ($61 billion) in 2019, 7% of the size of Britain's commerce with the European Union in 2019. Talks for a trade deal intensified in late 2021, just after the Premier League approved Saudi Arabia's sovereign wealth fund's takeover of Newcastle United from billionaire Mike Ashley

Minister of Industry, Commerce and Tourism for Bahrain, Zayed Al Zayani hoped that the two sides could complete negotiations by the "end of this year or the middle of next year," in January 2022.

In June 2021, International trade secretary Anne-Marie Trevelyan stated that the agreement would target a £1.6bn annual boost to the UK economy, and that the agreement would be a comprehensive FTA that will cover manufactured goods and agricultural produce to financial and digital services.

In 2023, the UK signed a Memorandum of understanding with the United Arab Emirates relating to financial services. On 4 July 2023, Bahrain announced plans to invest £1 billion in the UK as a preliminary move to strengthen ties related to financial services as part of the potential new trade deal.

== Negotiations ==
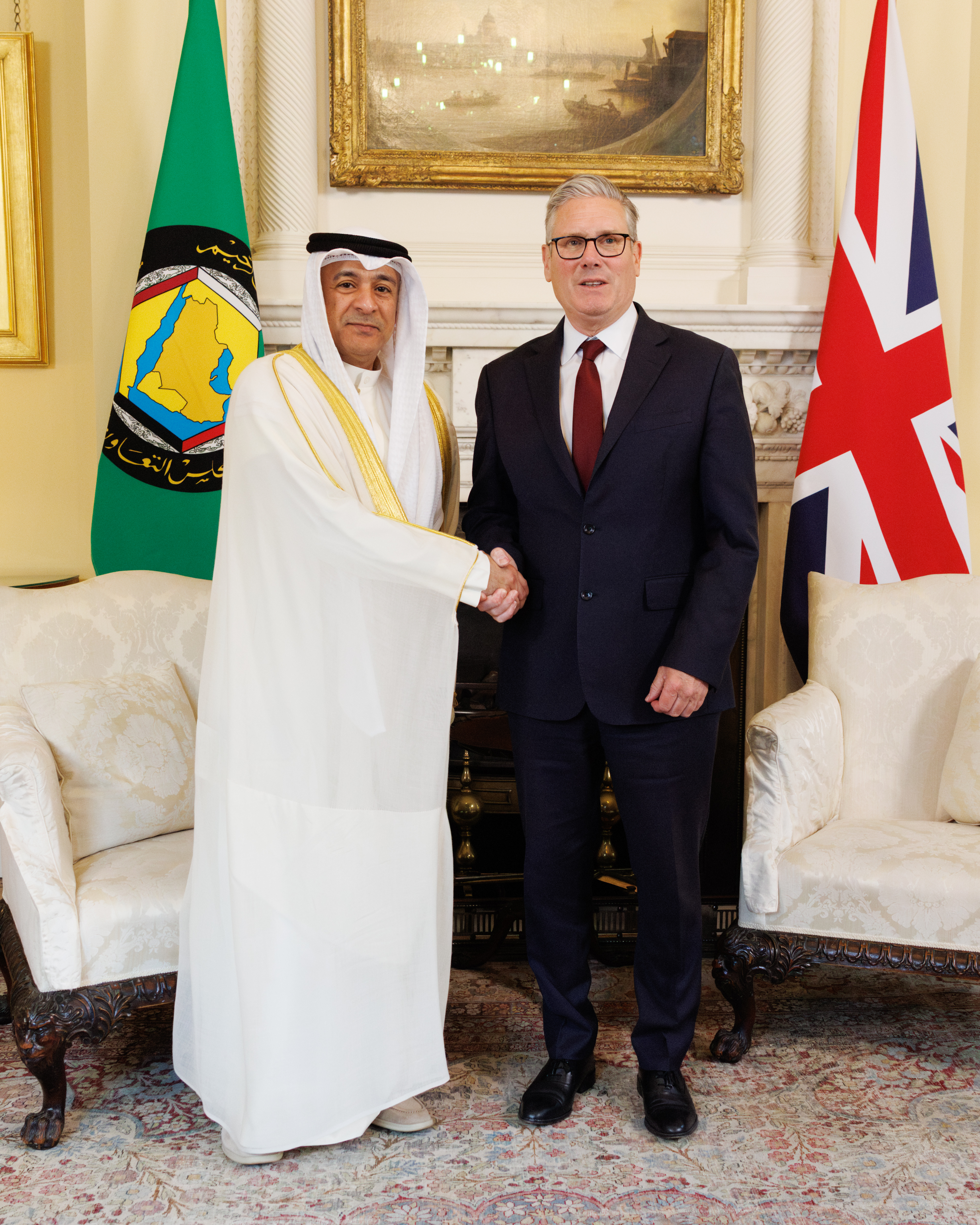
Gulf Cooperation Council General Secretary Jasem Mohamed Albudaiwi and British Prime Minister Keir Starmer in 10 Downing Street on 20 May 2026

GCCUKFTA: Negotiation Rounds
Round	Dates	Location	Ref.
1	22 August–29 September 2022	Virtual meeting	
2	5–9 December 2022	London	
3	12–16 March 2023	Riyadh	
4	17–28 July 2023	London	
5	5–16 November 2023	Riyadh	
6	29 January–9 February 2024	London	

Following difficulties in securing the India–United Kingdom Free Trade Agreement, as at 2024 some British trade officials were pessimistic about an India deal and viewed a free trade agreement with the Gulf Cooperation Council as a more realistic prospect given impending elections in India and the UK.

On 14 May 2024, Saudi Arabia and the United Kingdom hosted a joint investment summit with more than 450 British business attendees, including representatives from HSBC and British Airways. On 18 December 2024, the new Labour government's Minister, Douglas Alexander, updated the House of Commons on the negotiations. On 20 March 2025, Keir Starmer discussed the trade deal in a phone call with Mohammed bin Salman. On 26 April 2025, deputy prime minister David Lammy visited Oman and Qatar to discuss progress in the negotiations. The free trade agreement was signed on 20 May 2026, marking the first between a G7 member and the Gulf Cooperation Council.

== Controversy ==
In 2022, the Chair of the UK's All-Party Parliamentary Group on Democracy and Human Rights in the Gulf, Brendan O'Hara, criticized the lack of human rights talks taking place alongside the trade discussions. Trade negotiations had avoided discussions of events such as the murder of critical Saudi journalist Jamal Khashoggi, and the UAE's detention of British academic Matthew Hedges for alleged spying.

== See also ==
- Free trade agreements of the United Kingdom
- Foreign relations of Bahrain
- Foreign relations of Kuwait
- Foreign relations of Oman
- Foreign relations of Qatar
- Foreign relations of the United Arab Emirates
- Foreign relations of the United Kingdom
- Foreign relations of Saudi Arabia
- Bahrain–United Kingdom relations
- Oman–United Kingdom relations
- Qatar–United Kingdom relations
- Saudi Arabia–United Kingdom relations
- United Arab Emirates–United Kingdom relations
