= Cabmen's Shelter Fund =

Fund to run shelters for cab drivers in London

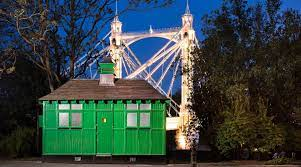
London Cabmen's Shelter on Chelsea Embankment

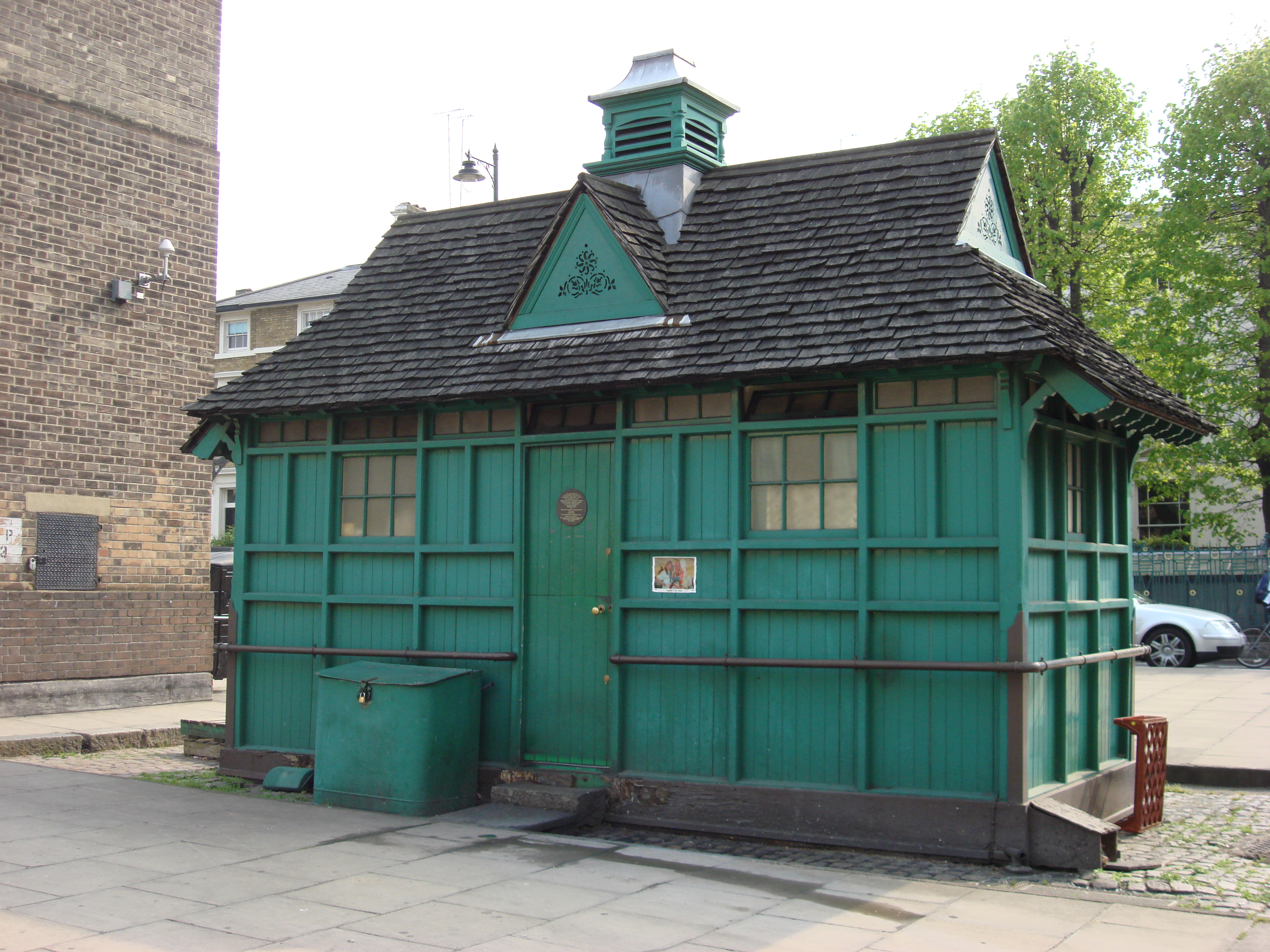
London Cabmen's Shelter in Warwick Avenue.

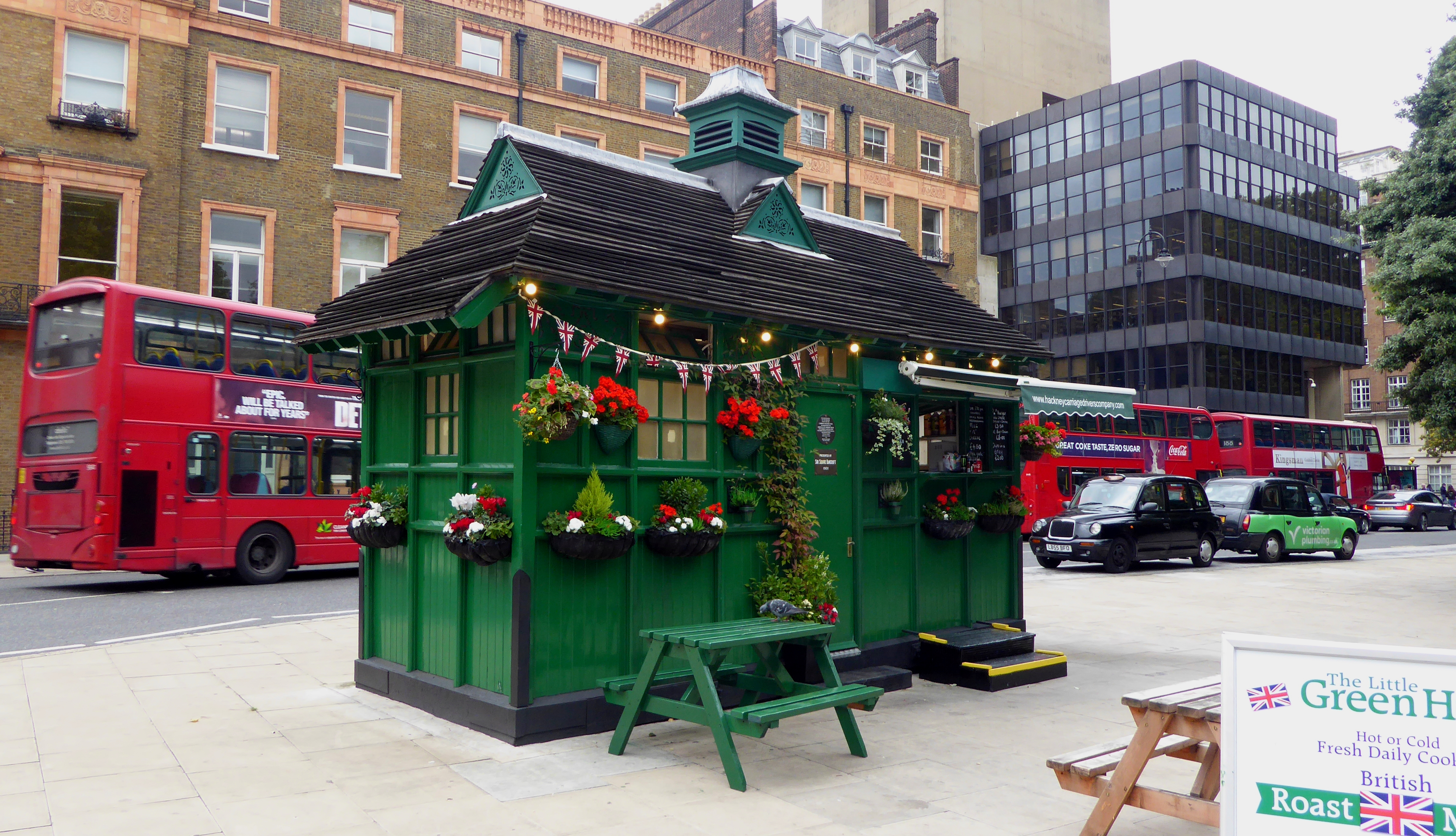
London Cabmen's Shelter in Russell Square.

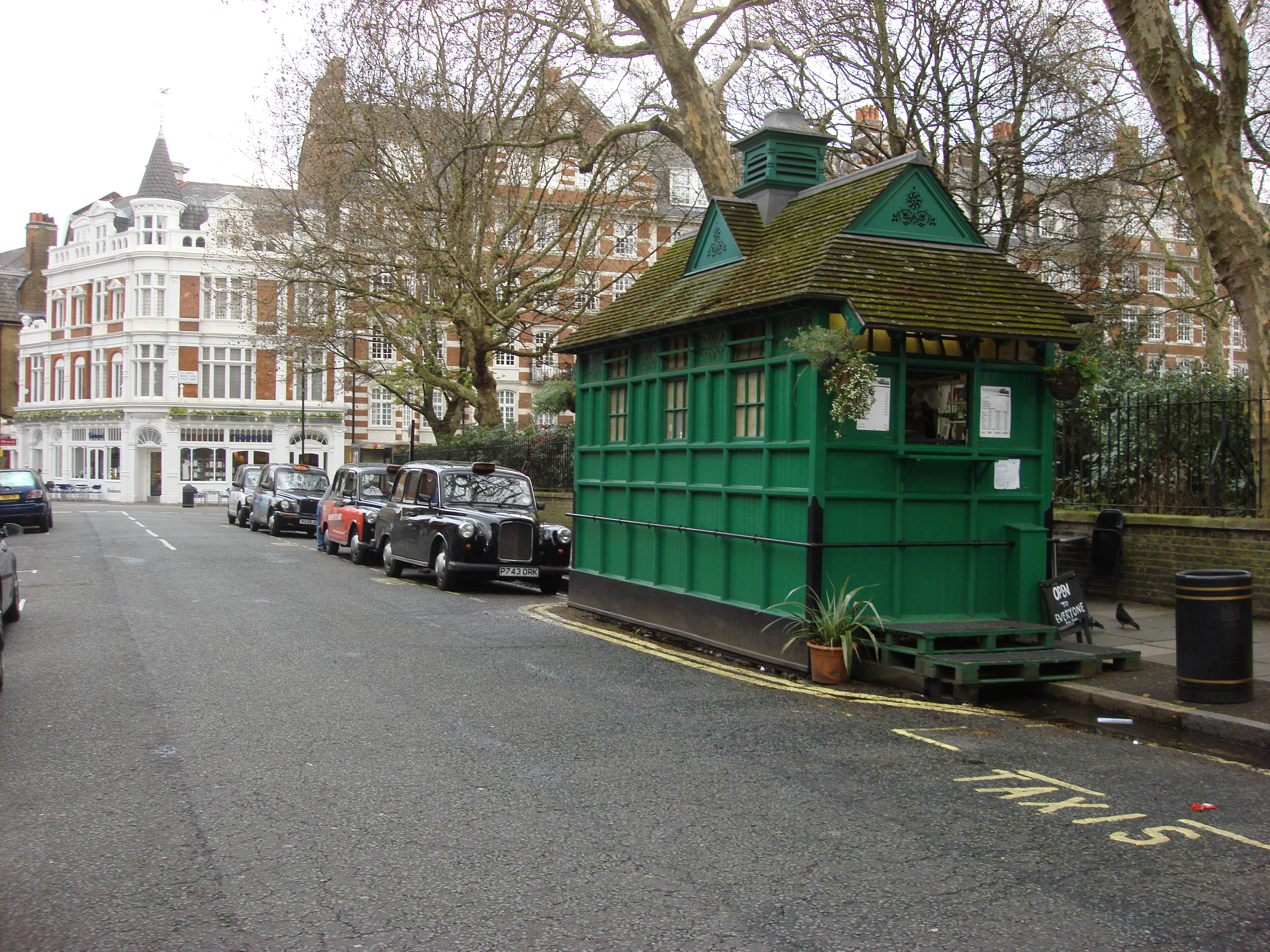
London Cabmen's Shelter in Wellington Place.

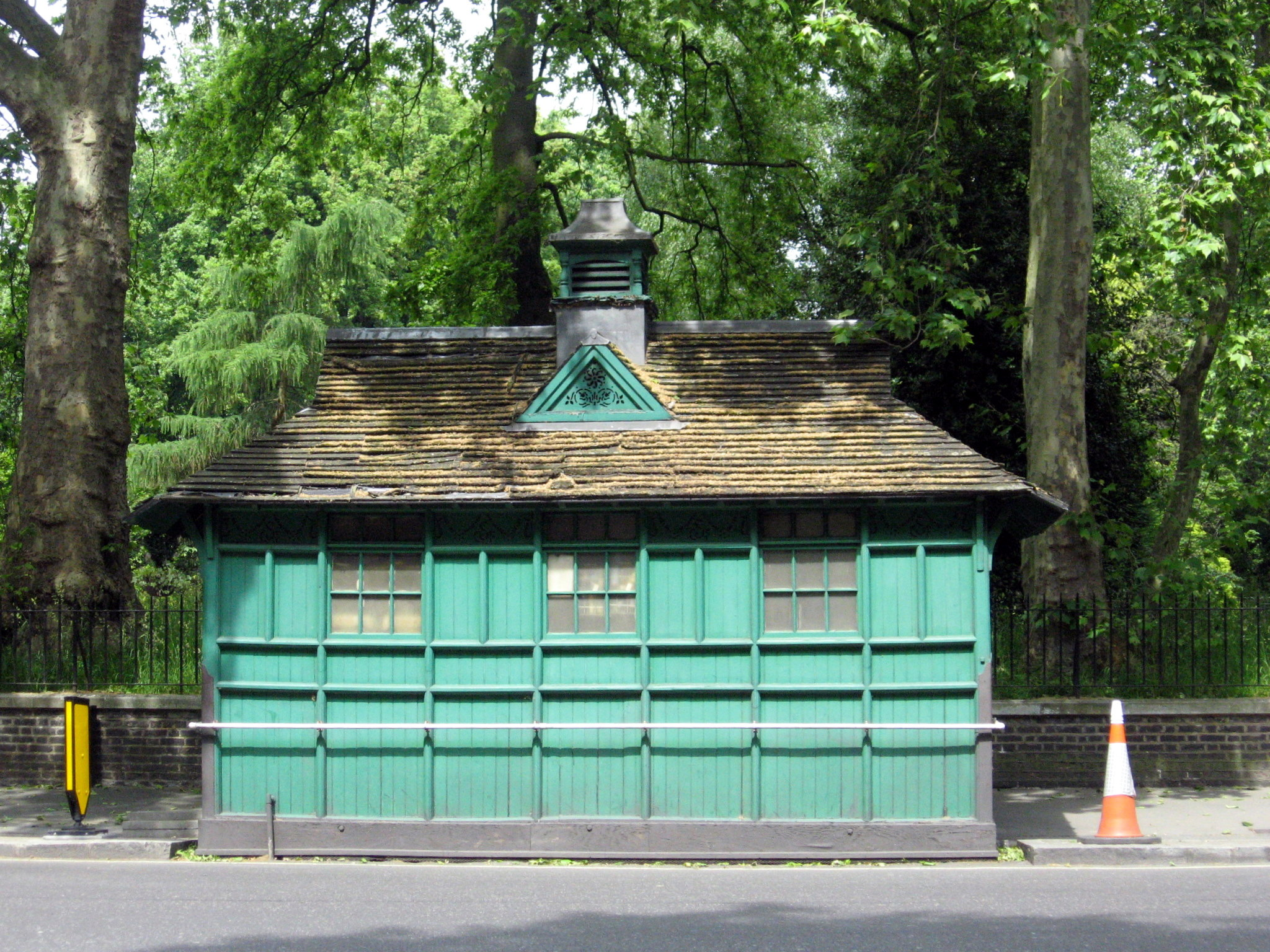
London Cabmen's Shelter in Kensington Road, W8.

The Cabmen's Shelter Fund was established in London, England, in 1875 to run shelters for the drivers of hansom cabs and later hackney carriages (taxicabs).

By law, cab drivers could not leave the cab stand while their cab was parked there. This made it very difficult for them to obtain hot meals and could be unpleasant in bad weather. If they drove to a pub to buy food then they would have to pay somebody to look after their cab while they were inside, otherwise it was likely to be stolen. In addition they would be tempted to drink alcohol on the job. Newspaper editor George Armstrong and The Earl of Shaftesbury took it upon themselves to set up a charity to construct and run shelters at major cab stands. The idea allegedly came to Armstrong when all the cabbies seeking a pub's refuge and warmth on a snowy night in St John's Wood rendered him unable to hire a taxi there.

These shelters were small green huts, which were not allowed to be larger than a horse and cart, as they stood on the public highway. Between 1875 and 1914, 61 of these buildings were built around London, the first being on Acacia Road in St John's Wood near Armstrong's home. Most were staffed by an attendant who sold food and (non-alcoholic) drink to the cabbies and were provided with a kitchen in which the attendant could cook this food and also food provided by the cabbies themselves. The attendant was not generally paid, but was expected to make an income from these sales. The shelters were also provided with seats and tables and books and newspapers, most of them donated by the publishers or other benefactors. Most could accommodate ten to thirteen men. Gambling, drinking and swearing were strictly forbidden.

Thirteen of the shelters still exist and are still run by the Cabmen's Shelter Fund. All are now Grade II listed buildings. They are located at:

- Chelsea Embankment SW3 – close to its junction with Albert Bridge, London
- Embankment Place WC2 – close to the Playhouse Theatre
- Grosvenor Gardens SW1 – to the west side of the north gardens
- Hanover Square, London W1 – on the north side of the central gardens
- Kensington Park Road W11 – outside numbers 8–10
- Kensington Road W8 – close to the junction of Queen's Gate SW7
- Pont Street SW1 – close to the junction of Sloane Street
- Russell Square WC1 – Western Corner (relocated here from Leicester Square)
- St. George's Square, Pimlico SW1 – on the north side
- Temple Place WC2 – opposite side of the road from the Swissötel Howard
- Thurloe Place, Kensington SW7 – previously in the middle of the road, now on the pavement, east of the entrance to the Victoria and Albert Museum
- Warwick Avenue, London W9 – centre of the road, by Warwick Avenue Underground station
- Wellington Place NW8 – near to Lord's Cricket Ground

During annual Open House London Heritage Days, the public gets a chance to see inside some of the shelters, normally the exclusive reserve of cab drivers.
