= Oman–United Kingdom relations =

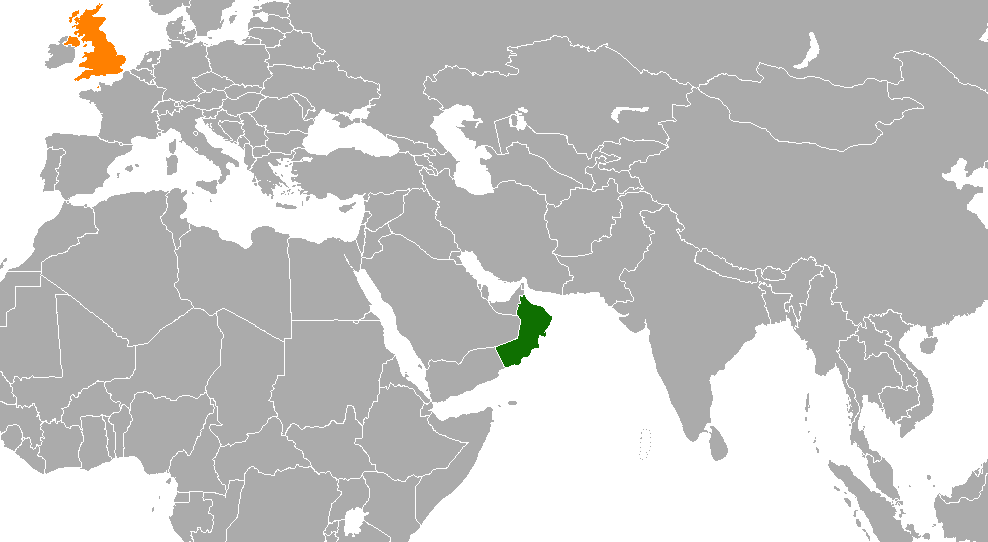

- Oman: United Kingdom

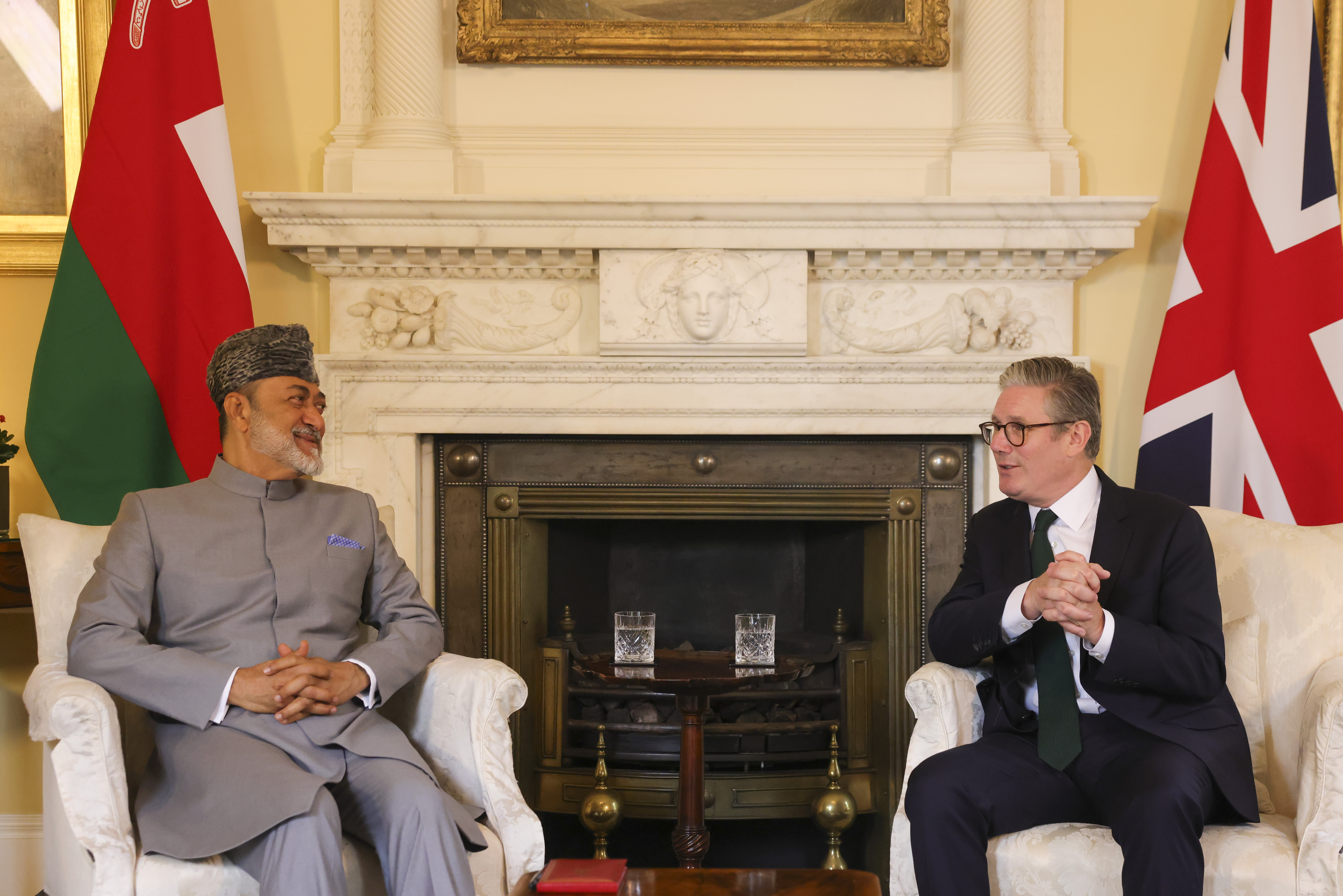
Omani Sultan Haitham bin Tariq with British Prime Minister Keir Starmer in 10 Downing Street, August 2024.

The relations between the United Kingdom and Oman are strong and strategic.

The United Kingdom has an embassy in Muscat and Oman has an embassy in London.

The Sultanate of Oman became independent from the United Kingdom in 1951. Before this, it was a protectorate of the UK, having been under British influence since the 1798 Anglo-Omani Treaty.

In 2026, Sultan Haitham bin Tarik made a state visit to the United Kingdom during which he called for a Middle East non-aggression pact.

== Economic relations ==
In 2022, the United Kingdom and the Gulf Cooperation Council, of which Oman is a member, opened up negotiations for the Gulf Cooperation Council–United Kingdom Free Trade Agreement one of the first post-Brexit trade agreements negotiated by the UK.

== Military relations ==
1970, British forces coerced succession by removing the Sultan and placing his son in power. The UK and Oman have close military ties. As part of this relationship the UK and Oman have held three large-scale joint exercises called Saif Sareea or "Swift Sword", the first of these being held in 1986. Saif Sareea II in 2001 was the largest deployment of UK forces since the Suez Crisis. Saif Sareea 3, held in 2018, was the largest exercise held by the two countries in terms of total personnel. Also the UK helped Oman to conquer the Imamate of Oman in the Jebel Akhdar War.

In April 2010 the government of Oman stated that it wanted to buy Eurofighter Typhoons from the UK. BAE Systems and Oman signed an agreement in December 2012, valued at £2.5 billion, for the delivery of 12 Eurofighter Typhoon jets along with 8 BAE Systems Hawk training jets. Oman is the only foreign export customer of the Challenger 2, Britain's main battle tank.

In 2022, Oman and the United Kingdom signed the Executive Order of the Mutual Defence Agreement, in order to cooperate in a number of fields, including the military.

== Royal visits ==
Queen Elizabeth II made two official state visits to the Sultanate of Oman during her reign: first from February 28 to March 3, 1979, and later from November 25 to November 28, 2010.

In 2013 and 2016, Charles, Prince of Wales and Camilla, Duchess of Cornwall visited Oman on behalf of the UK government as guests of the late Sultan Qaboos.

Sultan Qaboos paid a state visit to the United Kingdom in 1982 and was hosted by Queen Elizabeth II. In October 2026, Sultan Haitham made a state visit to the United Kingdom and was received by King Charles III and Queen Camilla at Windsor Castle.

== See also ==
- Foreign relations of Oman
- Foreign relations of the United Kingdom
