= Embassy of the United Arab Emirates, London =

Embassy of the United Arab Emirates in London
- سفارة دولة الامارات العربية المتحدة في لندن (Arabic)
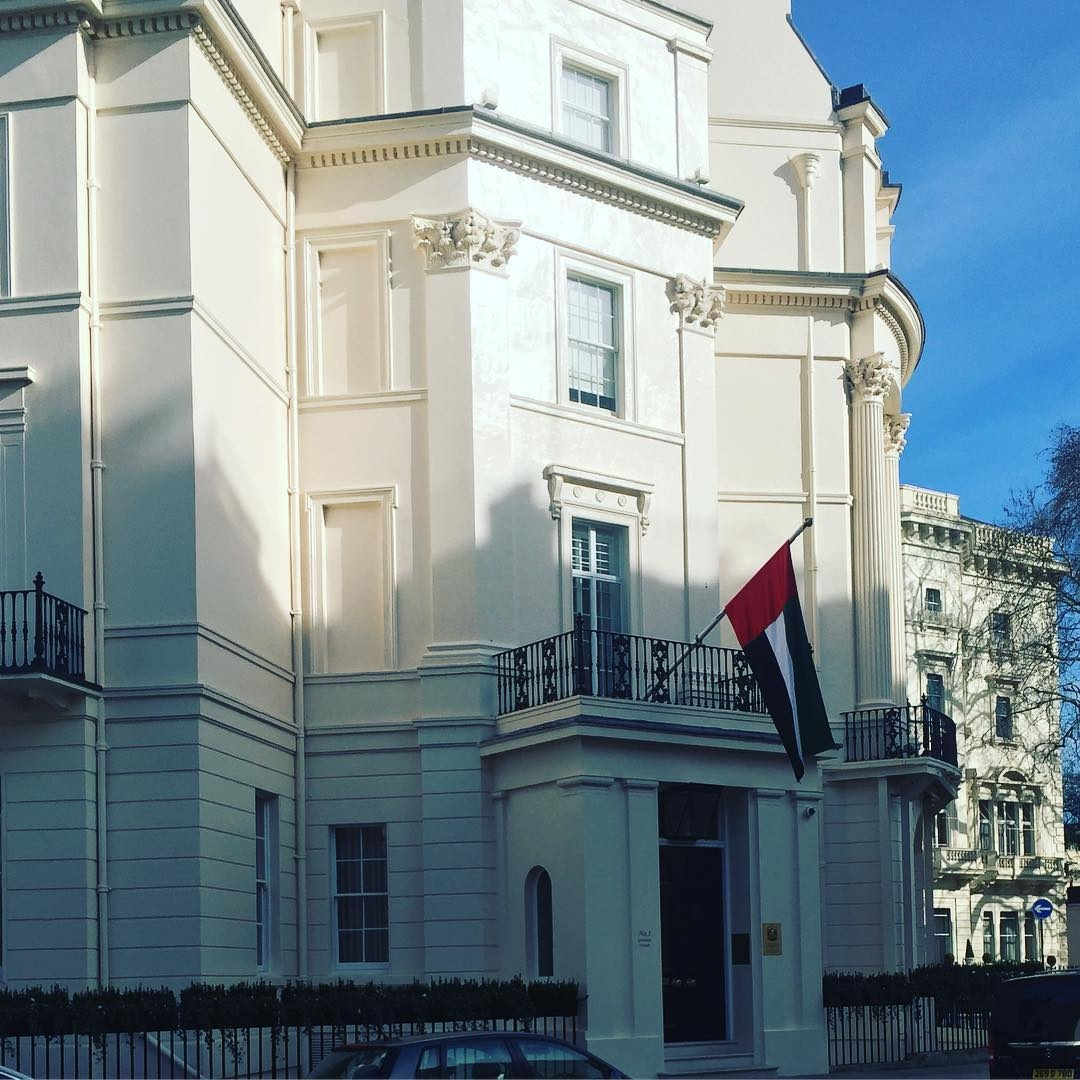
- Entrance to the embassy of the United Arab Emirates in London
- Interactive map of Embassy of the United Arab Emirates in London
- 51°30′02.2″N 0°09′12.4″W
- Location: Grosvenor Crescent, London

The Embassy of the United Arab Emirates at 1-2 Grosvenor Crescent in the Grosvenor Crescent district of London, is the diplomatic mission of the United Arab Emirates in the United Kingdom. The UAE also maintains a Consulate, Police Liaison Section & Cultural Attaché's office at 48 Prince's Gate, South Kensington, a Military Attaché's Office at 6 Queen's Gate Terrace, South Kensington and a Health Section at 71 Harley Street, Marylebone.

The embassy was inaugurated on 28 November 2017 and was moved from its previous location in South Kensington to Grosvenor Crescent. The embassy is located between Belgrave Square and Hyde Park corner in south-west London.

The old embassy was situated in a mid 19th-century stucco terraced house overlooking Hyde Park in Kensington Road, Westminster, London, next door to the Embassy of Tunisia and the Embassy of Afghanistan. The new embassy is an updated and expanded version of the previous embassy building and is on the cross intersection of two streets. The embassy serves Emirati nationals in the United Kingdom.
