= Cabinet of Qatar =

Executive branch of Qatar

The Cabinet of Qatar is the chief executive body of the State of Qatar, presided over by the prime minister, and executing the will of the emir, who acts as absolute monarch.

As of 2026, there are 19 cabinet ministers, with Mohammed bin Abdulrahman bin Jassim Al Thani acting as both prime minister and minister of foreign affairs.

The Emir Sheikh Tamim bin Hamad Al Thani, on 8 January 2024 issued Amiri Order No. (1) of 2024 and on 12 November 2024 issued Amiri Order No. (2) of 2024 to reshuffle the Cabinet.

Portrait	Office	Incumbent	Website
	Prime Minister and Minister of Foreign Affairs	Mohammed bin Abdulrahman al-Thani	https://www.gco.gov.qa/en/the-prime-minister/biography/
	Deputy Prime Minister and Minister of State for Defense Affairs	Saoud bin Abdulrahman Al Thani	https://www.gco.gov.qa/en/ministries/minister-of-state-for-defence-affairs/
	Minister of Interior	Khalifa bin Hamad bin Khalifa Al-Thani	https://www.gco.gov.qa/en/ministries/minister-of-interior/
	Minister of State for Energy Affairs	Saad Sherida al-Kaabi	https://www.gco.gov.qa/en/ministries/minister-of-state-for-energy-affairs/
	Minister of Awqaf and Islamic Affairs	Ghanem bin Shaheen bin Ghanem Al Ghanim	https://english.islam.gov.qa/
	Minister of Finance	Ali bin Ahmed al-Kuwari	http://www.mof.gov.qa/
	Minister of Justice and Minister of State for Cabinet Affairs	Ibrahim bin Ali bin Issa al-Hassan al-Mohannadi	https://www.moj.gov.qa/en/pages/default.aspx
	Minister of Education and Higher Education	Lolwah al-Khater	https://www.edu.gov.qa/en/pages/homepage.aspx
	Minister of Labour	Ali bin Samikh al-Marri	https://adlsa.gov.qa/en
	Minister of Municipality	Abdullah bin Hamad bin Abdullah al-Attiya	http://www.mme.gov.qa/cui/view.dox?id=1031&siteID=2
	Minister of Public Health	Mansoor bin Ebrahim bin Saad al-Mahmoud	https://www.moph.gov.qa/english/Pages/default.aspx
	Minister of Commerce and Industry	Faisal bin Thani bin Faisal Al Thani	https://www.moci.gov.qa/en/
	Minister of Transport	Mohammed bin Abdullah bin Mohammed Al Thani	https://www.motc.gov.qa/en
	Minister of Sports and Youth	Hamad Bin Khalifa Bin Ahmed Al-Thani	https://www.msy.gov.qa/index-en.php
	Minister of Culture	Abdulrahman bin Hamad bin Jassim bin Hamad Al Thani	https://www.moc.gov.qa/
	Minister of Environment and Climate Change	Abdulla bin Abdulaziz bin Turki al-Subaie	https://www.mecc.gov.qa/en/home/
	Minister of Communications and Information Technology	Mohammed bin Ali bin Mohammed al-Mannai	https://www.mcit.gov.qa/en
	Minister of Social Development and Family	Buthaina Bint Ali Al Jabr Al Nuaimi	https://msdf.gov.qa/en
	Minister of State for Foreign Affairs	Sultan bin Saad bin Sultan al-Muraikhi	https://www.gco.gov.qa/en/state-of-qatar/state-institutions/council-of-ministers/members-of-the-cabinet/minister-of-state-for-foreign-affairs/
