= Politics of Qatar =

The political system of Qatar is officially a constitutional hereditary monarchy, but scholars and observers consider the monarchical regime to be "authoritarian", "autocratic and absolutist", an "absolute monarchy" or even a "total autocracy". The emir holds all executive and legislative authority, as well as controlling the judiciary.

The emir act as head of state, chief executive and commander-in-chief of the armed forces, while the prime minister, appointed by the emir, acts as the head of government. Under the Constitution of Qatar, the Shura Council, which is appointed by the emir, has a limited ability to reject legislation and dismiss ministers. The first and last election for the Assembly was held in 2021, though the emir still appointed one third of its members. Political parties remained banned. In 2024 future elections were abolished.

== Form of government ==
Qatar is officially ruled by the House of Thani as a constitutional hereditary monarchy, but scholars and observers consider the monarchical regime to be "authoritarian", "autocratic and absolutist", an "absolute monarchy", or even a "total autocracy".

Articles 8 and 146 of Qatar's constitution make it so a separate 18-article law on "political rule and succession" is considered a special law which carries equal weight to the constitution, except in that unlike the constitution itself, it is not eligible for the procedure for constitutional amendment laid out in article 144.

== History of domestic politics ==
=== Rise to power of the Al Thanis ===
Qatar acquired permanent settlements only in the late 19th century. The Al Thanis first emerged as one of Qatar's influential and dominant clans in the 1850s, and accepted the suzerainty of the Ottoman Empire to strengthen their position against rivals. In 1868 the Al Thanis received British recognition of their rule, but still faced some opposition from other clans. They sought a stronger treaty with the British Empire, and eventually achieved it in 1916, greatly contributing to their political consolidation.

In the following decades, the Al Thanis became an almost exclusive center of power in the country, with the exception of British colonial power. Qatar's geography and relatively short history meant a weak merchant class and hardly any religious establishment, and other local tribes lost almost all power. The political system remained "highly personalist", with decision-making concentrated in the hands of the emir, and sometimes the heir apparent.

=== Discovery of oil and royal factionalism ===
In the 1950s, Britain started prompting the establishment of some state institutions, but throughout the 50s and 60s there was little political development. The discovery and exploitation of oil made the rule of the Al Thanis even more undisputed (and the Al Thanis came to be the only family allowed to name themselves sheikhs), but also increased tensions within the family. All successions, in 1913, 1949, 1960, 1972 and 1995, were contested, and did not go smoothly. The emirs tried to distribute land, oil wealth and political and institutional positions to the family to prevent political challenges, but largely failed, mostly contributing to the further empowerment of the family as a whole.

=== Consolidation of power and gestures of political liberalization after Hamad's coup ===
It was only Hamad bin Khalifa Al Thani, once he came to power in a bloodless palace coup in 1995 after gaining support from senior Al Thanis and the United States, that finally managed to concentrate political power more narrowly within the royal family, to himself and an inner circle of trusted relatives. One of his first official acts was changing the constitution so that the position of emir could only go to his sons, whereas before it could go to anyone within the family. He marginalized rivals within the family, and undertook an energetic drive to proliferate institutions of modern governance and entrust them to loyalists.

Qatar scholar Mehran Kamrava argues that Hamad's promises and gestures of political liberalization early in his rule were intended mostly to gain support from Western democratic countries, and especially the United States, while he consolidated power, and that after he did, the pretense of actual political liberalization was largely dropped. The 2003 constitution, which was part of the efforts to "bestow the regime with normative depth and symbolic legitimacy", actually gives the emir "near-absolute powers". Later scholars have also called Qatar's domestic political reforms "largely performative" steps, intended mostly to bolster its international image without enacting meaningful change, and said that Qatar's "political trajectory reflects a model of selective and symbolic democratization—embracing electoral forms while avoiding their full democratic substance." On 25 June 2013, Tamim bin Hamad Al Thani became the Emir of Qatar after his father Hamad bin Khalifa Al Thani handed over power in a televised speech.

==== Shura Council elections ====
In 2003, Qatar's new constitution first mandated that partial elections were to be held for the Shura Council, where 30 of its 45 members would be elected by the public, and 15 would remain appointed by the emir. Elections were first promised for 2005, but were delayed. In 2009, scholar Mehran Kamrava concluded that emir Hamad bin Khalifa's rhetoric on political liberalization was mostly meant to recruit support in the West while he consolidated power, and predicted that "for the time being" chances that these elections would actually take place "seem minimal".

Elections were delayed several more times, until they were finally held in practice in 2021. The disenfranchisement of Qataris whose ancestors were naturalized after 1930 sparked tensions and criticism. Some observers, especially after the abolishment of further elections in 2024, noted that the timing of the election, after many delays, shortly before the 2022 FIFA World Cup, suggested that the election had more to do with Qatar wanting to improve its international image than with genuine political liberalization.

==== 2024 abolition of Shura Council elections ====
In October 2024, Emir Tamim bin Hamad Al Thani announced a constitutional referendum on proposals to abolish elections to the Shura Council and revert it to a fully appointed body, and said that "the Shura Council is not a representative parliament in a democratic system, and its status and powers will not be affected whether its members are chosen by election or appointment". He also noted that the election had produced conflict among families and tribes. The referendum was held in November 2024, with the Ministry of Interior saying that 89% of voters backed it, officially abolishing future elections and returning the Council to being fully appointed by the emir. AP called it "yet another rollback in the hereditarily ruled Gulf Arab states of halting steps to embrace representational rule". The referendum also lifted limitations that prohibited the descendants of Qataris naturalized after 1930 from being appointed to the council.

== Executive branch ==
The emir holds all executive authority in Qatar. He is the head of state, chief executive and commander-in-chief of the armed forces, and he appoints the cabinet and the prime minister, who serves as the head of government. The Shura Council, an advisory legislative body which is fully appointed by the emir, can dismiss ministers with a two-thirds majority vote.

Main office-holders
Office	Name	Since
Emir	Tamim bin Hamad Al Thani	25 June 2013
Prime Minister	Mohammed bin Abdulrahman bin Jassim Al Thani	7 March 2023

=== Ministries ===
- Ministry of Commerce and Industry
- Ministry of Communications and Information Technology
- Ministry of Culture
- Ministry of Endowments and Islamic Affairs
- Ministry of Education and Higher Education
- Ministry of Environment and Climate Change
- Ministry of Finance
- Ministry of Foreign Affairs
- Ministry of Interior
- Ministry of Justice
- Ministry of Labour
- Ministry of Municipality
- Ministry of Public Health
- Ministry of Social Development and Family
- Ministry of Sports and Youth
- Ministry of Transport

=== Administrative divisions ===
There are 8 municipalities (baladiyat (plural), baladiyah (singular)) of Qatar; Al Daayen, Al Khor, Al Wakrah, Al Rayyan, Al-Shahaniya, Al Shamal, Doha, and Umm Salal. The municipalities assume administrative responsibilities over zones (cities and districts) within their boundaries, and are managed by the Ministry of Municipality.

==== Central Municipal Council elections ====
Suffrage in Qatar is currently limited to elections to the advisory Central Municipal Council (CMC), with the voting age set at 18. The first elections to the CMC were held in 1999, with men and women voters and candidates, and take place every four years. Non-citizen residents, who make up around 90% of Qatar's population, are excluded from participation. The elected Central Municipal Council has no executive or legislative powers, and is limited to offering advice to the Ministry of Municipality, which manages Qatar's municipalities itself. The elections for the CMC's 29 members occur over 29 constituencies, which are not aligned with the borders of the municipalities.

== Legislative branch ==
=== Structure and authorities ===
The Shura Council is a 45-member advisory legislature made up of 45 members, all appointed by the emir. The body has the authority to approve "general state policies and the budget", but "has no say in the setting of defence, security, economic and investment policy". Its legislation on other matters must be ratified by the emir, and although the Council may overrule that veto with a two-thirds supermajority, the emir can still suspend that law indefinitely "to serve the higher interests of the country". The Council may also dismiss a minister, but not the prime minister, through a two-thirds vote of no confidence. According to Freedom House's 2026 report, the emir effectively holds all legislative authority in Qatar.

== Legal system ==
According to Qatar's constitution, Sharia is a main source of Qatari legislation. Sharia is applied to laws pertaining to family law, inheritance, and several criminal acts (including adultery, robbery and murder). In some cases in Sharia-based family courts, a female's testimony is worth half a man's and in some cases a female witness is not accepted at all. Codified family law was introduced in 2006. In practice, Qatar's legal system is a mixture of civil law and Islamic law.

No stonings have ever been carried out in Qatar and it has been repealed as a legal sentence. Apostasy is a crime punishable by the death penalty in Qatar. Blasphemy is punishable by up to seven years in prison and proselytizing can be punished by up to 10 years in prison. Homosexuality is a crime punishable by the death penalty for Muslims.

In 2014, Qatar launched a modesty campaign to remind tourists of the modest dress code. Female tourists are advised not to wear leggings, miniskirts, sleeveless dresses and short or tight clothing in public. Men are advised against wearing only shorts and singlets.

Commercial relationships are governed by Qatar's Civil Code.

Qatar's government has been criticized for arresting and threatening anyone who dissents. A report published by the Euro-Med Human Rights Monitor on 13 September 2020 noted that Article 47 in the Constitution of Qatar stipulates that freedom of expression is guaranteed in accordance with the conditions and circumstances set forth in law, but stated that Qatari authorities "continue to implement some laws and policies, despite violating the Qatari constitution and its international human rights obligations", and called on them to "accelerate reforms enabling individuals to peacefully exercise their right of expression and opinion as they wish and the right to freedom of publication, assembly, and association".

=== Alcohol ===
Alcohol consumption is partially legal in Qatar, some five-star luxury hotels are allowed to sell alcohol to their non-Muslim customers. Muslims are not allowed to consume alcohol in Qatar and Muslims caught consuming alcohol are liable to flogging or deportation. Non-Muslim expatriates can obtain a permit to purchase alcohol for personal consumption. The Qatar Distribution Company (a subsidiary of Qatar Airways) is permitted to import alcohol and pork; it operates the one and only liquor store in the country, which also sells pork to holders of liquor licences. Qatari officials had also indicated a willingness to allow alcohol in "fan zones" at the 2022 FIFA World Cup.

Until recently, restaurants on The Pearl Island (a human-made island near Doha) were allowed to serve alcoholic drinks. In December 2011, however, restaurants on The Pearl were told to stop selling alcohol. No explanation was given for the ban. Speculation about the reason includes the government's desire to project a more pious image in advance of the country's first election of a royal advisory body and rumours of a financial dispute between the government and the resort's developers. Despite the economic consequences of the ban, many believe that it has been a necessary measure in order to ensure the safety and enjoyment of fans at the World Cup. Qatar's World Cup chief executive of the Supreme Committee for Delivery and Legacy, Nasser Al Khater, stated that the purpose of the designated sobering-up areas was to ensure the fans' safety.

=== Workers ===
On 16 January 2020 Qatar announced that most migrant workers who previously required an exit permit to leave Qatar would no longer require one.

Cases of ill-treatment of immigrant labour have been observed. The Nepalese ambassador to Qatar, Maya Kumari Sharma, described the emirate as an "open jail". Qatar does not have national occupational health standards or guidelines, and workplace injuries are the third highest cause of accidental deaths. In May 2012, Qatari officials declared their intention to allow the establishment of an independent trade union. Qatar also announced it will scrap its sponsor system for foreign labour, which requires that all foreign workers be sponsored by local employers, who in some cases hold workers' passports and can deny them permission to change jobs.

In August 2022, 60 migrant workers were arrested and deported for protesting against the non-payment by their employer, Al Bandary International Group, a major construction and hospitality firm. Some of the demonstrators were from Nepal, Bangladesh, India, Egypt and the Philippines had not been paid for seven months. According to a report published by France 24, those protesters were detained for breaching public security laws and minority of protesters were deported by the order of court who failed to remain peaceful and breached Qatar's public security law. Qatar's labour ministry said it will pay Al Bandary workers and will take further action against the company which was already under investigation for failing to pay wages.

== Foreign relations ==
Qatar's core foreign policy objective according to The Middle East Journal is "state survival" and the "desire for international prestige". Qatar became notable in international politics; and a key figure in the Arab affairs within two decades of its independent foreign policy. It has an "open-door" foreign policy where it maintain ties to all parties and regional players in the region, including with organizations such as Taliban and Hamas.

Its position in the Middle East and close links with terrorist groups is seen as a great asset to western intelligence community and diplomatic relations. Qatar has also cultivated close foreign relationships with Western powers, particularly the United States and the United Kingdom. Al Udeid Air Base hosts American and British air forces.

On October 10, 2005, for the first time, Qatar was elected to a two-year term on the UN Security Council for 2006–2007.

According to BBC, in April 2006 Qatar announced that it will give US$50 million (£28 million) to the new Hamas-led Palestinian government.

In May 2006, Qatar pledged more than $100 million to Hurricane Katrina relief to colleges and universities in Louisiana affected by the hurricane. Some of this money was also distributed to families looking to repair damaged homes by Neighborhood Housing Services of New Orleans, Inc.

There were some allegations on Qatar for supporting rebels group in Syria and association with al- Nusra front also persisted in country's profile for a long time. However, the Public Policy and Democracy studies research think tank recognized the nation for its execution of current peace against conflicts strategies and policy upgrades. Other discoveries from the research claimed that Qatar supported the US against the Assad government. Additionally, the nation supported efforts to mediate a conflict-ending political transition in Syria. In March 2021, Qatar, Russia, and Turkey also started a different track of talks on the Syrian peace process.

The government and royal family of Qatar funds the Al Jazeera television network. The Emir of Qatar Sheikh Hamad bin Khalfia provided a loan of QAR 500 million (US$137 million) to start the channel. The network has been accused of being biased and taking an active role in the affairs of other countries specifically during the Arab Spring in 2011. Numerous countries have complained about allegedly biased reporting in support of Qatari policy.

Most of the developed countries (plus Brunei and Indonesia) are exempt from visa requirements. Citizens of exempted countries can also request a joint visa that allows them to travel to Oman as well.

Qatar is member of ABEDA, AFESD, AL, AMF, ESCWA, FAO, G-77, GCC, IAEA, IBRD, ICAO, ICRM, IDB, IFAD, IFRCS, IHO (pending member), ILO, IMF, International Maritime Organization, Inmarsat, Intelsat, Interpol, IOC, ISO (correspondent), ITU, NAM, OAPEC, OIC, OPCW, UN, UNCTAD, UNESCO, UNIDO, UPU, WCO, WHO, WIPO, WMO, and WTO.

Qatar may suffer significant geopolitical losses if there is a global transition to renewable energy. It is ranked 152 out of 156 countries in the index of Geopolitical Gains and Losses after energy transition (GeGaLo).

In September, 2014. QFFD contributed in enhancing stability for Syrian refugees. Qatar Charity facilitated access to quality education through the rehabilitation of 6 Formal schools in Turkey, Gaziantep, Urfa, Kilis, targeting a total number of 13,540 beneficiaries and 12,860 girls and boys.

On July 10, 2017, according to documents obtained by Al Arabiya, Qatar agreed to quit supporting the Muslim Brotherhood. In order to avoid undermining relations with the Gulf, it also removed non-citizens from Qatar and refused to provide shelter to anyone from a GCC nation.

Qatar claims that "since 2017, Qatar feels it has been the victim of a media attack orchestrated by Abu Dhabi, with false documents and fake news." The Qatari Government stated that they were being "exclusively criticised and attacked" by Belgian authorities and conveyed disappointment that the Belgian government "made no effort to engage with our government to establish the facts".

In January 2021 the United States, represented by the United States Department of Defense, awarded Sheikh Mohammed bin Abdulrahman bin Jassim Al Thani with the Department of Defense Medal for Distinguished Public Service, one of the highest honors bestowed by the US to officials. The then US National Security Adviser Robert C. O'Brien gave the medal to the Ambassador of Qatar to the US Sheikh Meshaal bin Hamad Al Thani, on behalf of Sheikh Mohammed bin Abdulrahman bin Jassim Al Thani.

This award was in recognition of his exemplary diplomatic efforts to strengthen relations between the State of Qatar and the United States, to support and advance peace efforts in Afghanistan (including the signing of the US–Taliban peace deal on February 29, 2020, as well as the launch of the Afghan peace process on September 12, 2020), to promote stability and prosperity in the Middle East North Africa region, and to resolve the Gulf Crisis through diplomacy.

Qatar mediated a deal between the United States and Iran, which in September 2023 saw the release of five prisoners in each country and the unfreezing of US$6 billion of Iranian funds, which had been frozen due to sanctions imposed by the U.S. The U.S. citizens were flown to Doha and greeted by U.S. ambassador to Qatar Timmy T. Davis and Qatar Airways CEO Akbar Al Baker before boarding a plane to Washington, D.C.. U.S. President Biden thanked Sheikh Tamim and Qatari officials for their role in the mediation as well as establishing a "Humanitarian channel" for Iran. The US$6 billion were released to banks in Doha under the condition that Iran could use the funds only for humanitarian purposes.

== See also ==
- Democracy in the Middle East and North Africa
- Freedom of expression in Qatar
