= Lolwah al-Khater =

Qatari diplomat and politician

Her Excellency Lolwah Rashid Mohammed al-Khater
- لؤلؤة الخاطر
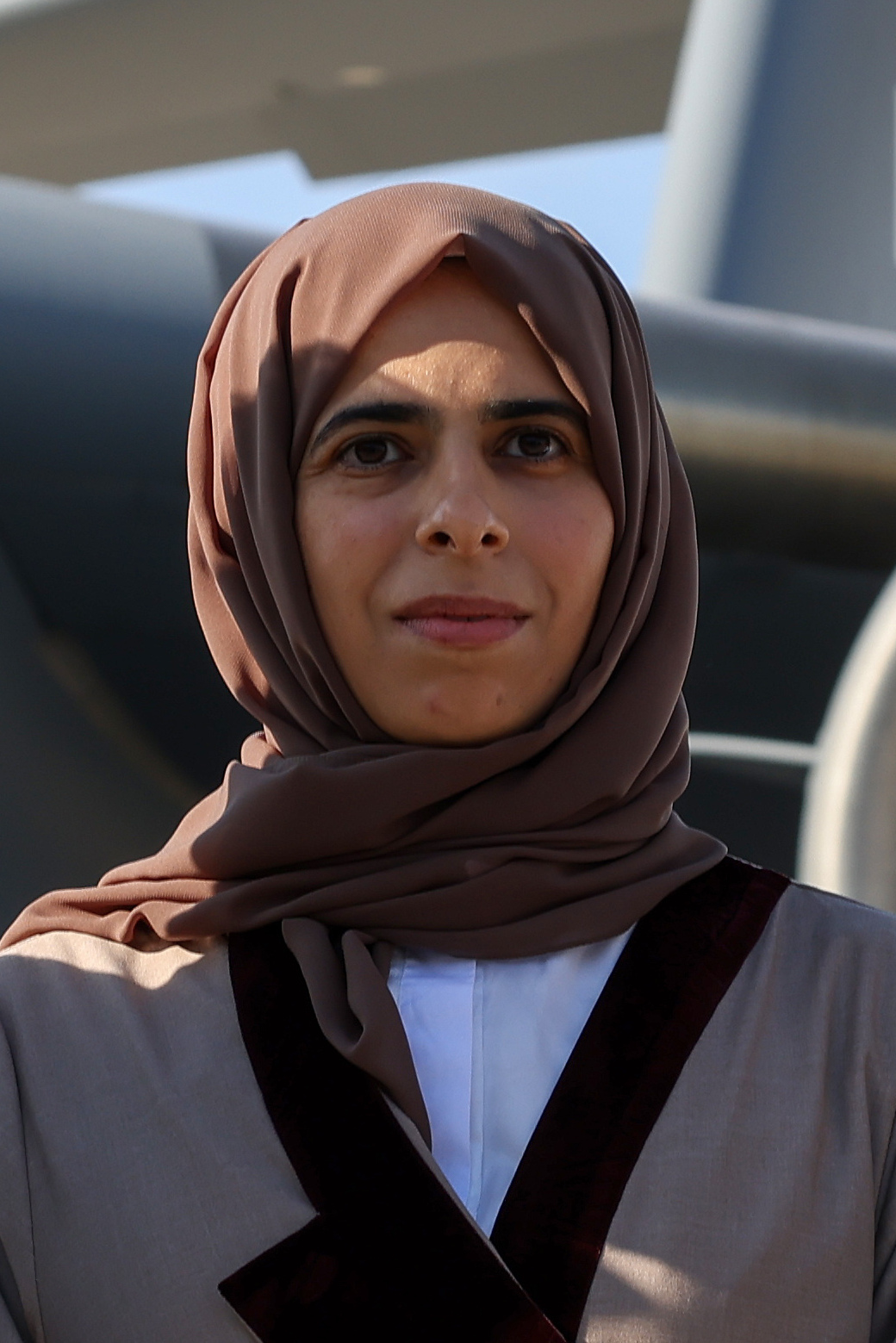
- Lolwah al-Khater in 2024

Minister of Education and Higher Education
- Incumbent
- Assumed office 12 November 2024
- Monarch: Tamim bin Hamad Al Thani
- Prime Minister: Mohammed bin Abdulrahman bin Jassim Al Thani
- Preceded by: Buthaina bint Ali al-Jabr al-Nuaimi

Minister of State for International Cooperation at the Ministry of Foreign Affairs
- In office 2023–2024
- Monarch: Tamim bin Hamad Al Thani
- Prime Minister: Mohammed bin Abdulrahman bin Jassim Al Thani
- Minister: Mohammed bin Abdulrahman bin Jassim Al Thani
- Succeeded by: Mariam bint Ali bin Nasser Al Misnad

Assistant Foreign Minister of Qatar
- In office 2019–2023
- Monarch: Tamim bin Hamad Al Thani
- Prime Minister: Abdullah bin Nasser bin Khalifa Al Thani
- Minister: Mohammed bin Abdulrahman bin Jassim Al Thani

Spokesperson for the Qatari Ministry of Foreign Affairs
- In office 2017–2022
- Monarch: Tamim bin Hamad Al Thani
- Prime Minister: Abdullah bin Nasser bin Khalifa Al Thani; Mohammed bin Abdulrahman bin Jassim Al Thani
- Minister: Mohammed bin Abdulrahman bin Jassim Al Thani
- Succeeded by: Majed al-Ansari

Personal details
- Education: Master of Science in Computing, and a Master’s of Arts in Public Policy
- Alma mater: Imperial College London; Hamad Bin Khalifa University
- Website: https://www.edu.gov.qa/en/leaders

Lolwah Rashid Mohammed al-Khater (Arabic: لؤلؤة الخاطر) (born in Doha, Qatar) is the Qatari Minister of Education and Higher Education since 12 November 2024. She is a diplomat, who was the first Qatari woman to hold the position of Spokesperson for the Qatari Ministry of Foreign Affairs and Assistant Foreign Minister of Qatar. Between March 2023 and November 2024, she had served as Minister of State for International Cooperation at the Ministry of Foreign Affairs.

== Career ==
Lolwah al-Khater holds a master's of science in computing and initially worked as an engineer in the field of oil and gas. She pursued a master's of arts in public policy, with a focus on public policy and Islam. According to her biography, she is a part-time lecturer at the Doha Institute for Graduate Studies and a research associate at The Oxford Gulf and Arabian Peninsula Forum at St Antony's College at the University of Oxford. According to her biography, she is a DPhil Candidate at the University of Oxford in the area of Oriental Studies, examining Islam and Modernity in the context of the Arab Nahda.

al-Khater entered the Qatari ministry of foreign affairs as a minister plenipotentiary. She was Director of Planning and Quality at Qatar Tourism Authority and a Research Project Manager at Qatar Foundation for Education, Science and Community Development. In 2017, al-Khater was appointed the Spokesperson of the Ministry of Foreign Affairs by Mohammed bin Abdulrahman Al Thani, the first woman to hold this post. This appointment has been cited as an important advance in women's representation in the Qatari government. In this role, she was "one of the most prominent voices" advocating for Qatar during the 2017 Qatar diplomatic crisis, according to Al Khaleej, and pushed for "a meaningful solution" to the Syrian civil war. In 2019, she was appointed Assistant Minister of Foreign Affairs by Emir Tamim bin Hamad Al Thani.

She is Spokesperson for the Supreme Committee for Crisis Management in Qatar. In this role, she delivered daily briefings to the public on Qatar TV during the COVID-19 pandemic.

She is a member of the Advisory Board of the Georgetown University in Qatar.

In March 2023, Emir Tamim bin Hamad Al Thani appointed al-Khater Minister of State for International Cooperation at the Ministry of Foreign Affairs.

Following the outbreak of the Gaza war, al-Khater was the first foreign official to visit the besieged Gaza Strip on 26 November. There she surveyed the disputed influx of aid, met wounded Palestinians and spoke with Wael al-Dahdouh, Gaza bureau chief of Qatari-funded Al Jazeera, who lost his wife, son and grandchild in an Israeli airstrike. Over and above that, discussions on bilateral cooperation took place in October between HE Al Khater, and HE Tim Watts, Assistant Minister for Foreign Affairs of Australia, which included topics such as developments in the Gaza Strip and strategies for joint humanitarian aid efforts in the region. Watts also appreciated Qatar's initiatives focused on de-escalation and protecting civilians.

In March 2024, following successful mediation efforts by Qatar to reunite children with their families amid the Russia-Ukraine conflict, HE al-Khater expressed nation's gratitude to Russia and Ukraine for their cooperation and commitment to the children's safety and well-being. She highlighted Russia's provision of care and treatment for the children during their stay and thanked Children's Rights Commissioner Maria Lvova-Belova and Ukrainian Parliament Commissioner for Human Rights Dmytro Lubinets for their significant contributions to the successful family reunifications.

At the "Women for Palestine" conference in Doha on May 11, 2024, HE Al Khater praised Palestinian women and children as embodiments of resilience. Moreover, Qatar has played a crucial role in mediating the release of captives from Gaza and advocating for a ceasefire in the embattled region.

On 12 November 2024, Al Khater was appointed as Minister of Education and Higher Education.

== Writings ==
- Tok, M. Evren; Al-Khater, Lolwah R. M.; Pal, Leslie A. (2016). Policy-making in a transformative state : the case of Qatar. London: Palgrave Macmillan. ISBN 978-1-137-46639-6.
- Al-Khater, Lolwah. Educational Outputs and Labor Market Needs: A study on Labor Market Issues and methods of Addressing Them. General Secretariat of the Gulf Cooperation Council.

== See also ==
- Alya bint Ahmed Al Thani
