= Mariam bint Ali bin Nasser al-Misnad =

Qatari politician

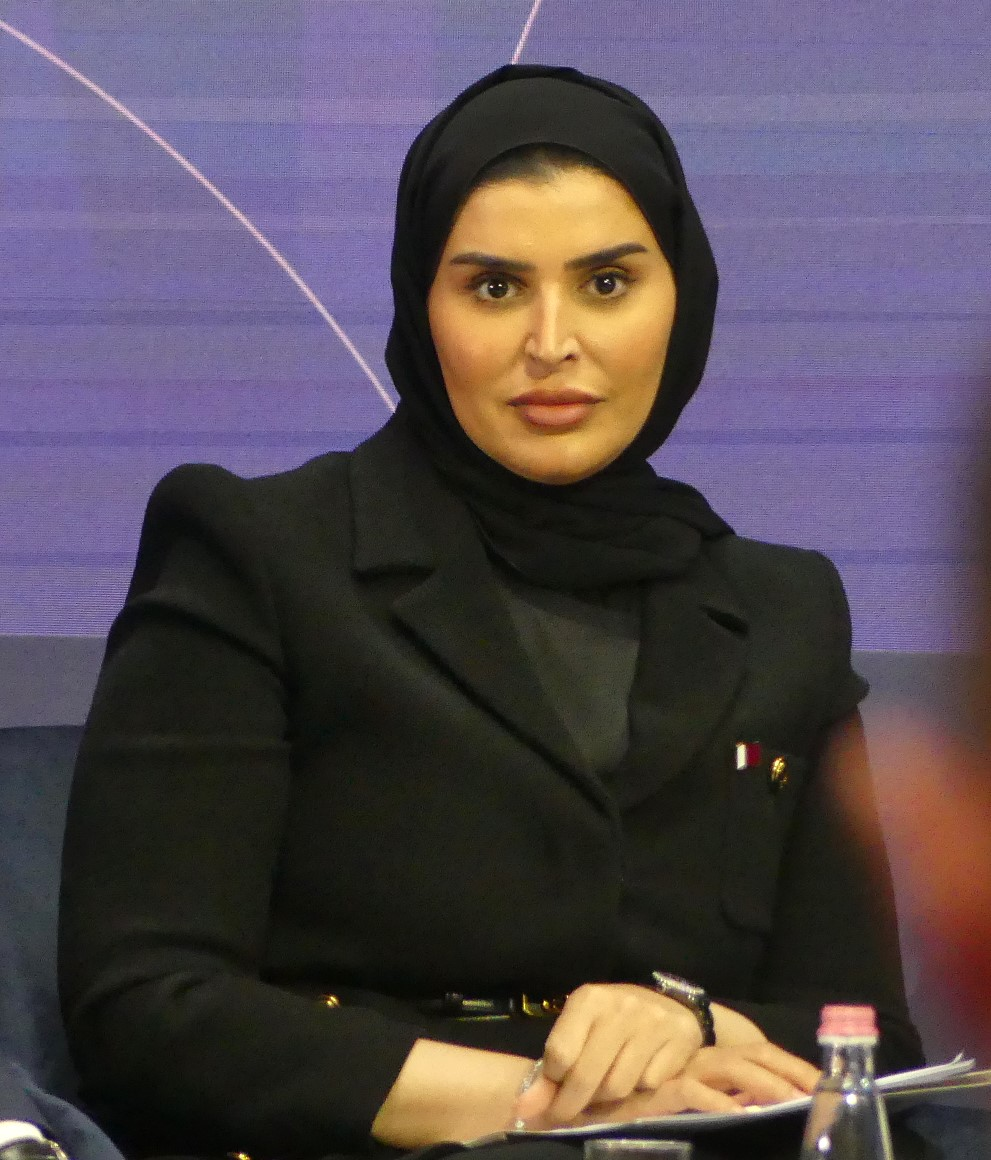

Minister of State for International Cooperation
- Incumbent
- Assumed office 12 November 2024
- Monarch: Tamim bin Hamad Al Thani
- Prime Minister: Khalid bin Khalifa bin Abdul Aziz Al Thani
- Preceded by: Yousuf Mohamed Al Othman Fakhroo
- Succeeded by: Buthaina bint Ali al-Jabr al-Nuaimi

Personal details
- Education: HEC Paris (MAS)

Mariam bint Ali bin Nasser al-Misnad is a Qatari politician. She was appointed Minister of State for International Cooperation at the Ministry of Foreign Affairs, pursuant to Amiri Order No. (4) of 2024. She is also the vice-chairperson of the Board of Directors of the Qatar Fund for Development (QFFD). Previously, she had served as Minister of Social Development and Family from 19 October 2021, until 12 November 2024. She currently serves as the Minister of State for International Cooperation at the Ministry of Foreign Affairs of Qatar.

== Education ==
Al-Misnad holds an Executive master's degree in Strategic Planning and Business Administration (2014) from HEC Paris.

She also holds a bachelor's degree in Humanities and English Literature from Qatar University.

She received a PHD in Public Administration from the University of Hassan the Second, 2025.

== Career ==
In 2006, al-Misnad was a member of the Childhood Committee at the Supreme Council for Family Affairs.

In 2008, she worked as executive director of the Childhood Cultural Centre.

From 2011 until 2013, she was the head of the Media and Communication Department of the Social Rehabilitation Center "Al-Aween".

In 2013, al-Misnad served as the Regional Director of Communication and Awareness Campaigns at the Foundation “Education Above All”.

Between 2013 and 2021, she was the executive director of the Orphans Care Center "Dreama".

On 7 March 2021, al-Misnad was appointed as executive director of Administration and Finance Division at the Doha Institute.

Between 19 October 2021 and 12 November 2024, she had served as Minister of Social Development and Family.

On 13 June 2023, al-Misnad chaired the coordination meeting of Arab Ministers of Social Affairs for the Conference of States Parties to the Convention on the Rights of Persons with Disabilities at the UN Headquarters in New York City.

Additionally served as the chairperson of the regulatory authority for charitable activities from 2021 until 2024.

In November 2024, al-Misnad was appointed Minister of State for International Cooperation at the Ministry of Foreign Affairs. Currently, the president of the advisory board of the center for conflict and humanitarian studies.

Following the 2025 Kunar earthquake, al-Misnad went to Kabul in September to oversee the delivery of humanitarian aid by the Qatari government, making her the first female minister to visit Afghanistan on a humanitarian mission since the Taliban takeover in 2021.

She is also a member of the board of trustees of the Qatar Museum Authority.

== Awards ==
- International Ambassador for Orphans by the Committee of Sanabil Award for Social Responsibility in 2019;
- International Social Responsibility Excellence Award in 2021.
