= Majed al-Ansari =

Qatari government official

Coordinates: 25.327483°N 51.527681°E

His Excellency Majed al-Ansari
- ماجد الأنصاري

Advisor to the Prime Minister of Qatar
- Incumbent
- Assumed office 2022
- Monarch: Tamim bin Hamad Al Thani
- Prime Minister: Mohammed bin Abdulrahman bin Jassim Al Thani

Spokesperson for the Qatari Ministry of Foreign Affairs
- Incumbent
- Assumed office 22 February 2022
- Monarch: Tamim bin Hamad Al Thani
- Minister: Mohammed bin Abdulrahman bin Jassim Al Thani
- Preceded by: Lolwah Al-Khater

Personal details
- Education: Bachelor's degree in Political Science; Master's and PhD in Social Change
- Alma mater: University of Leeds; University of Manchester
- Occupation: Government official, academic

Majed bin Mohammed al-Ansari (Arabic: ماجد الأنصاري) is a Qatari government official. Since 2022, he has been an advisor to Qatari Prime Minister Mohammed bin Abdulrahman bin Jassim Al Thani and the spokesperson for the Foreign Ministry of Qatar.

== Biography ==
Al-Ansari received a bachelor's degree in political science from Leeds University in the UK, and a master's and doctorate degree in social change from the University of Manchester. He began his career at the Foreign Ministry of Qatar as a researcher in international relations in the office of the First Deputy Prime Minister and Foreign Minister in 2005. He then worked as an assistant professor and the Director of the Policy Department at the Institute of Social and Economic Survey Research of Qatar University. Beginning in 2019, he was head of the Qatar International Academy for Security Studies.

Qatari Prime Minister Mohammed bin Abdulrahman bin Jassim Al Thani appointed al-Ansari as his new advisor and the spokesperson for the Foreign Ministry of Qatar in February 2022, succeeding Lolwah Al-Khater.

In April 2024, Al-Ansari gave his first interview to an Israeli news outlet when he spoke with Haaretz. He also gave an interview with Kan. According to Haaretz reporter Jonathan Lis, the decision to be interviewed by Israeli news outlets and allow an Israeli journalist to enter Qatar via the local airport indicated Qatar's increased openness to engaging in direct dialogue with the Israeli public.
