= Najeeb Al Nuaimi =

- Occupations: lawyer, writer, human rights activist, professor
- Known for: Minister of Justice in Qatar; Member of Saddam Hussein's legal defense team; lawyer of Mohammed al-Ajami

Najeeb Al Nuaimi (Arabic: نجيب النعيمي) is a Qatari lawyer and human rights activist. He is a former cabinet minister of Qatar, having served as the Minister of Justice from 1995 to 1997. He previously taught public law at Qatar University.

Al Nuaimi and his firm assembled a legal defense team to represent more than 70 prisoners in Guantanamo Bay in 2002. He was a lead lawyer on Saddam Hussein's final legal defense team. He also served as the defense lawyer for imprisoned Qatari poet Mohammed al-Ajami in 2013.

== Personal life ==
In 2001, his cousin, a 22-year-old Bahraini citizen named Abdulla Majid Al Naimi, was detained in Pakistan and later sent to Guantanamo Bay.

Al Nuaimi obtained degrees in law in Egypt and the United Kingdom.

== Career ==
From 1995 to 1997, he served as Minister of Justice of Qatar. In 1997, he established his legal firm, Law Offices of Dr Najeeb Al Nauimi. In 2002, he and his firm assembled a legal team to represent alleged Al-Qaeda and Taliban members held at Guantanamo Bay. He represented between 70 and 100 prisoners. He argued that the majority of prisoners held in Guantanamo Bay were wrongly accused of being terrorists by the Pakistani police force and the Afghan Northern Alliance.

He was one of the three foreign lawyers on Saddam Hussein's legal defense team. He took part in the Dujail and Anfal trials, arguing that the trials were held unlawfully because the U.S. invasion contravened international law. He claimed he was contacted by Saddam's family and colleagues to take up the job. He later described Saddam's trial as a "trial of ethnicity, not an international trial". Al Nuaimi did not request payment for his services.

He represented Qatari poet Mohammed al-Ajami, who had been imprisoned by the Qatari government for reciting a poem which was deemed to be critical to the emir. Al-Ajami was handed down a life sentence in 2012, which Al Nuaimi appealed. In February 2013, the court reduced his sentence to 15-years. After the trial, Al Nuaimi announced that he would file another appeal, this time to Qatar's highest court, the Court of Cassation. Speaking on the second appeal, he said "we know at the end of the day he will be pardoned". In October, the Court of Cassation ruled against the poet, upholding the 15-year sentence. Al Nuaimi responded to the ruling by proclaiming “our judicial system cannot be trusted”.

In 2012, Nuaimi claimed that he would defend Syrian president Bashar al-Assad and Sudanese president Omar al-Bashir in court if it was requested of him. However, he declined an offer to represent former Egyptian president Hosni Mubarak in court.
