= Muhammed al-Ajami =

Muhammed al-Ajami could refer to:

- Mohammed al-Ajami, Qatari poet
- Muhammed al-Ajami, a Muslim saint whose shrine is located in the former Palestinian village of al-Majdal, Tiberias
