= Embassy of the State of Qatar, Nigeria =

Embassy of the State of Qatar, Abuja
- سفارة دولة قطر أبوجا
- Interactive map of the Embassy of the State of Qatar, Abuja area

General information
- Location: Abubakar Abdu Crescent, (Sunrise Hills) Asokoro, Abuja, Nigeria
- Coordinates: 9.0426°N 7.5334°E

The Embassy of the State of Qatar, Nigeria is a diplomatic mission of the state of Qatar in Nigeria. It is the only representation of the state of Qatar in Nigeria. The embassy serves the Cameroon, Gabon and Sao Tome and was opened in the Federal Republic of Nigeria on 13 December 2013. The Mission is currently headed by Ambassador Amb. Yousef Mohammed Ahmed Al-Hail. The embassy is located at 2130 Sunrise Hills Estate, Asokoro District of FCT Abuja.

== Mission leaders ==
=== Ambassador ===
- Amb. Yousef Mohammed Ahmed Al-Hail

=== Other Embassy members ===
- Khalifa Hamad Al-Khalifa (Counselor)
- Abdulla Hilal A-Nuaimi (Second Secretary)

== Previous embassy location ==
- No. 1, Aguyi Ironsi, (Transcorp Hilton), Maitama FCT Abuja.

== See also ==
- Ministry of Foreign Affairs, Qatar
