= Mexico–Qatar relations =

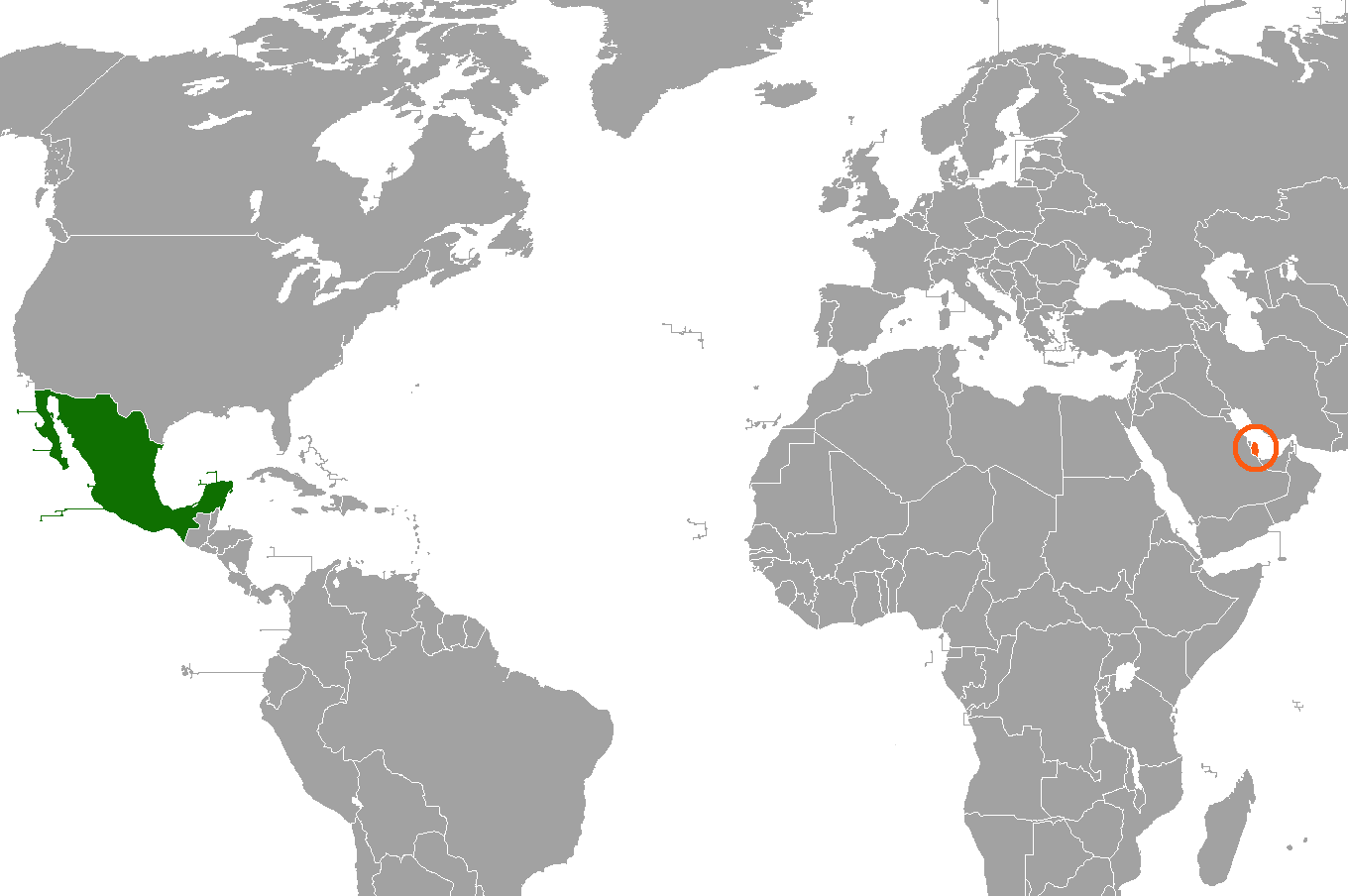

- Mexico: Qatar

The nations of Mexico and Qatar established diplomatic relations in 1975. Both nations are members of the United Nations.

== History ==
Diplomatic relations between the two nations began on 30 June 1975, a few years after Qatar gained its independence from the United Kingdom. Since the establishment of diplomatic relations, relations between both nations were kept mainly through international organizations such as the United Nations. Over the past few years, cooperation between the two nations has increased.

In June 2010, Mexican Foreign Secretary Patricia Espinosa paid a visit to Qatar. In 2014 Mexican Foreign Secretary José Antonio Meade also paid a visit to Qatar. That same year, Qatar opened an embassy in Mexico City. The gesture was reciprocated in 2015 with Mexico opening an embassy in Doha.

In November 2015, Emir of Qatar, Sheikh Tamim bin Hamad Al Thani paid an official visit to Mexico. During the Sheikh's visit, several agreements and memorandums were signed. In January 2016, Mexican President Enrique Peña Nieto paid an official visit to Qatar and was accompanied by Foreign Secretary Claudia Ruiz Massieu. During his visit, President Peña Nieto met with Sheikh Tamim bin Hamad Al Thani and both leaders signed of various cooperation agreements.

In August 2021, with the return of control of the Taliban in Afghanistan; Mexico in coordination with Qatar helped in the evacuation of over 2,000 Afghan refugees. Qatar Emiri Air Force planes arrived at Mexico City International Airport carrying groups of Afghan citizens.

In March 2022, Mexican Foreign Secretary Marcelo Ebrard paid a visit to Qatar and met with his counterpart Qatari Foreign Minister Mohammed bin Abdulrahman bin Jassim Al Thani. While in Qatar, Ebrard discussed the upcoming FIFA World Cup being held in Qatar and attended the Doha Forum. In November of that same year, Foreign Secretary Ebrard returned to Qatar and inaugurated the Mexico Center in Doha to provide consular protection and assistance to the nearly 100,000 Mexican fans who attended the World Cup.

In February 2024, Mexican Secretary of Agriculture, Víctor Villalobos, paid a four day visit to Qatar to seek Qatari investment opportunities in Mexico's agricultural industry. In October 2026, Qatari State Minister for Foreign Affairs, Sultan bin Saad al-Muraikhi, paid a visit to Mexico and met with his counterpart Roberto Velasco Álvarez. During their encounter, both officials led the third meeting of the Mechanism for Consultations on Matters of Common Interest between Mexico and Qatar. Qatar also announced the upcoming opening of a naval attaché office at the Qatari embassy in Mexico City, which is aimed at fostering greater cooperation on maritime and security matters. 2026 is the "Mexico-Qatar Year of Culture".

== High-level visits ==
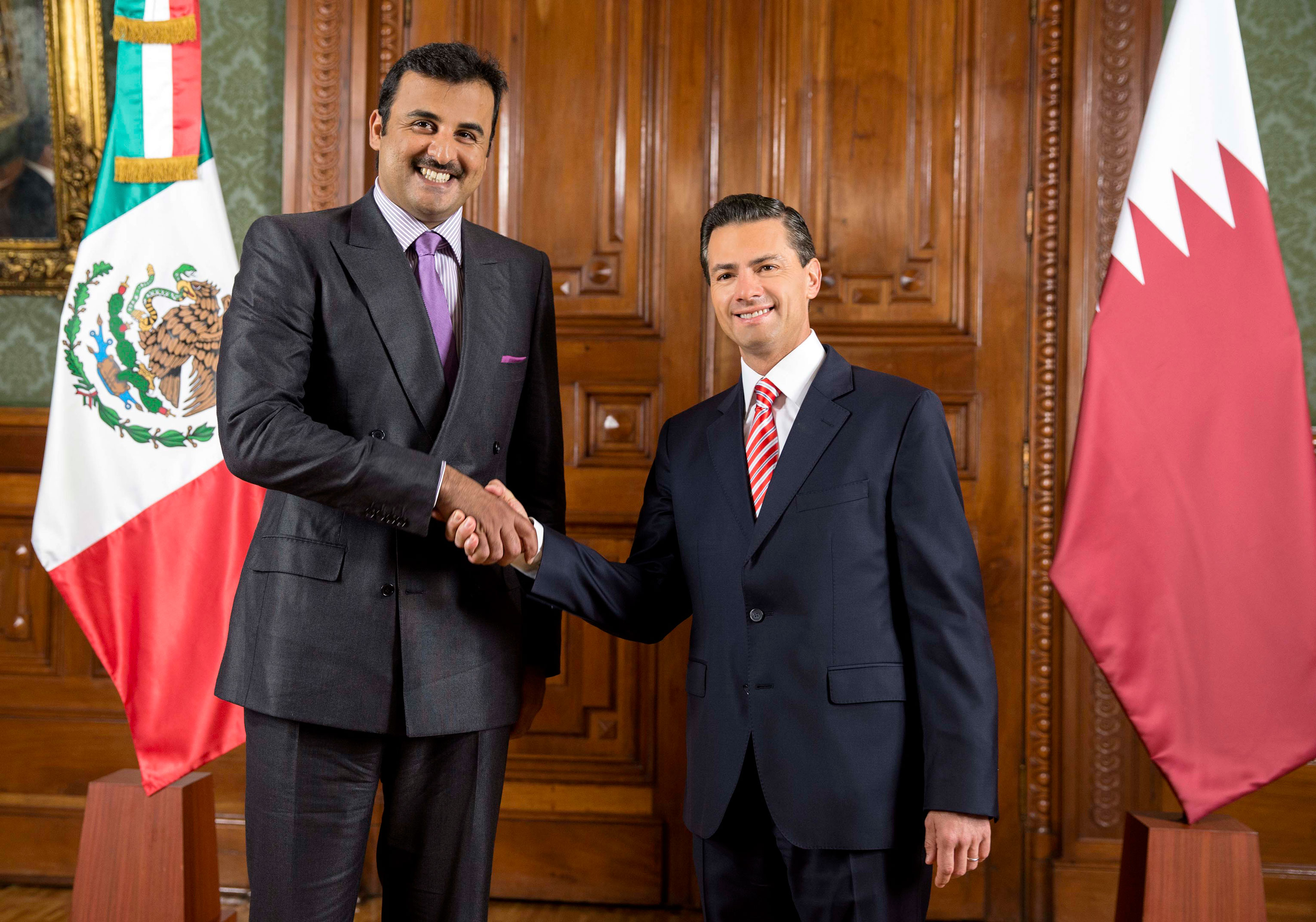
Sheikh Tamim bin Hamad Al Thani of Qatar meeting with Mexican President Enrique Peña Nieto in Mexico City; November 2015.

High-level visits from Mexico to Qatar

- Foreign Undersecretary Lourdes Aranda (2007, 2011)
- Foreign Secretary Patricia Espinosa (2010)
- Foreign Secretary José Antonio Meade (2014)
- Foreign Undersecretary Carlos de Icaza (2014)
- President Enrique Peña Nieto (2016)
- Foreign Secretary Claudia Ruiz Massieu (2016)
- Foreign Secretary Marcelo Ebrard (March and November 2022)
- Secretary of Agriculture Víctor Villalobos (2024)

High-level visits from Qatar to Mexico

- Sheikh Tamim bin Hamad Al Thani (2015)
- Foreign State Minister Sultan bin Saad al-Muraikhi (2026)

== Bilateral agreements ==
Both nations have signed several bilateral agreements such as an Agreement to Avoid Double Taxation and Prevent Tax Evasion in the Matter of Income Taxes (2012); Agreement on Air Services (2015); Agreement on Technical Cooperation (2015); Agreement on Artistic and Cultural Cooperation (2016); Agreement of Cooperation between the Mexican and Qatari News Agencies (2016); Memorandum of Understanding of Cooperation in the Energy Sectors (2016); Agreement on Educational Cooperation (2016); Memorandum of Understanding in Sports Cooperation (2016); and a Memorandum of Understanding between Mexico's Bank for Foreign Trade (Bancomext) and the Doha Bank and Qatar National Bank (2016).

== Trade ==
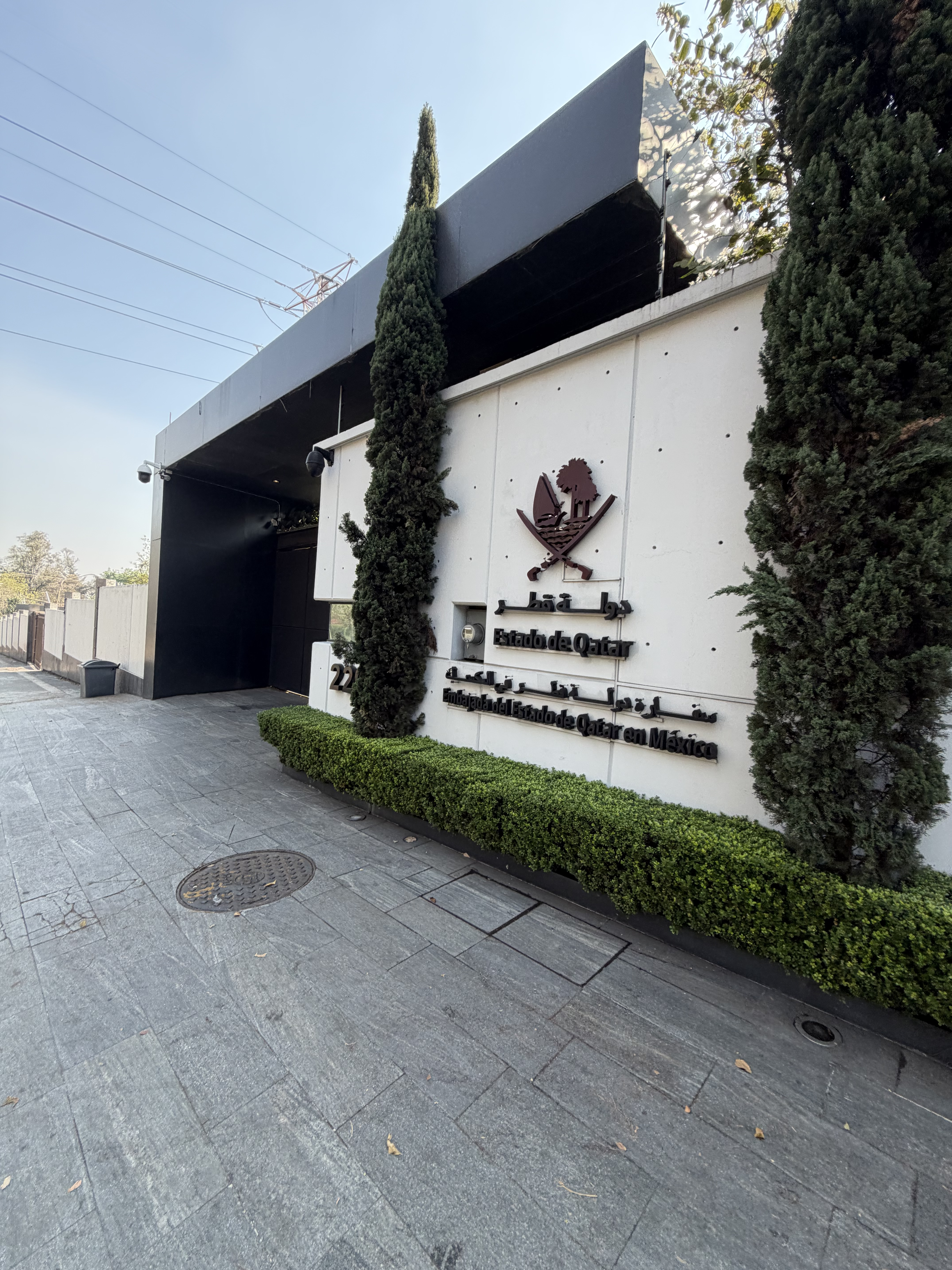
Embassy of Qatar in Mexico City

In 2023, total trade between the two nations amounted to US$233 million. Mexico's main exports to Qatar include: tubes and pipes of iron or steel, motor vehicles for the transport of goods and people, medical equipment, disc, tapes and other media for sound recordings; machinery, rubber tires, chemical based products, alcohol, fruits, vegetables, nuts, and fiberglass. Qatar's main exports to Mexico include: unwrought aluminum, mineral or chemical nitrogenates, petroleum, woven fabric, and articles of plastic.

Qatar Airways operates cargo services between Doha and Mexico City. Mexican multinational company KidZania operates in Qatar.

== Resident diplomatic missions ==
- Mexico has an embassy in Doha.
- Qatar has an embassy in Mexico City.
