= Road signs in Qatar =

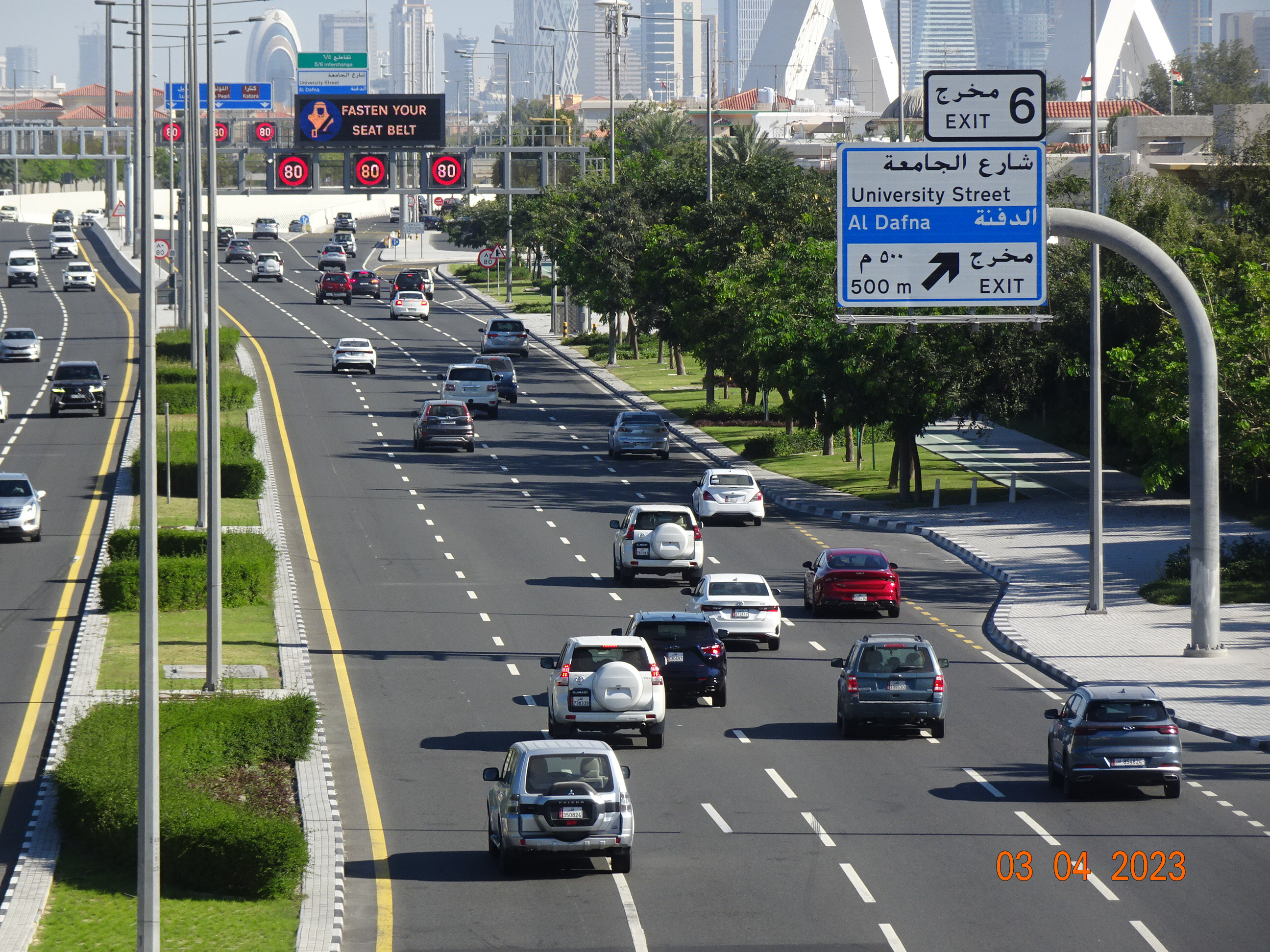
Road signs in the Onaiza District of Doha.

Road signs in Qatar are regulated under the Qatar Traffic Control Manual (QTCM) published by the Ministry of Transport. They closely follow those used in the United Kingdom with certain distinctions. They are written bilingually in Arabic and English text, much like other Middle Eastern countries.

== History ==
In its early years, Qatar's road system was heavily influenced by its historical ties with the United Kingdom. Qatar officially acceded to the Vienna Convention on Road Signs and Signals on February 10, 2022. The accession was finalized via Decree No. 40 of 2022, which saw Qatar join both the Vienna Convention on Road Traffic and the Vienna Convention on Road Signs and Signals simultaneously.

== Regulatory signs ==
Stop

Give way

Give way to pedestrians

Mandatory roundabout

Turn left

Turn right

Diverge to the left

Diverge to the right

Diverge to the left or right

Turn left ahead

Turn right ahead

Keep left

Keep right

Pass on either side

One-way traffic

Go straight ahead

U-turn

Priority over oncoming traffic

Priority to oncoming traffic

No left turn

No right turn

No U-turn

No entry

No animals

No pedestrians

Customs

Bike path

Shared path

Segregated path

Segregated path

== Warning signs ==
Stop sign ahead

Give way sign ahead

Crossroads

Side intersection (left)

Side intersection (right)

Staggered intersection (left, right)

Staggered intersection (right, left)

Dead end on side road (left)

Dead end on side road (right)

T-intersection

Reduce speed now

Roundabout

Countdown marker (left, 300m)

Countdown marker (right, 300m)

Countdown marker (left, 200m)

Countdown marker (right, 200m)

Countdown marker (left, 100m)

Countdown marker (right, 100m)

U-turn ahead

Merging traffic from the left

Merging traffic from the right

Traffic merges onto main road (left)

Traffic merges onto main road (right)

Curve to the left

Curve to the right

Intersection on a curve (left)

Intersection on a curve (right)

Double curve to the left

Double curve to the right

Road narrows (both)

Road narrow (left)

Road narrow (right)

End of dual carriageway

Two-way traffic

Two-way traffic on route crossing ahead

Hazard chevrons (blue, right)

Hazard chevrons (blue, left)

Hazard chevrons (red, right)

Hazard chevrons (red, left)

Hazard chevron (right)

Hazard chevron (left)

Drawbridge

Tunnel ahead

Maximum height

Traffic signals ahead

Pedestrian crossing ahead

Children

Elderly crossing

Camels

Speed bump

Uneven surface

Soft verges

Slippery surface

Loose gravel

End of paved road

Rumble strips

Low-flying aircraft

Low-flying helicopter

Falling rocks

Sand dunes

Electrified overhead cable ahead

Quayside ahead

Slow moving vehicles on incline ahead

Military vehicles crossing

Traffic queues likely

Cyclists ahead

Fire station

Side winds

Danger ahead

Pay toll in 1.6 km

Stop ahead - pay toll

Last exit before toll

Wrong way - go back

Cycles crossing

Traffic calmed area

Children crossing in a school zone

Children crossing in a school zone with speed bumps present

Speed bumps in a school zone

School bus

Hazard markers

Trams

Level crossing with gates or barriers

Flashing level crossing signals ahead

Railway crossing

Open tramway without signals

Keep crossing clear

Drivers of long low vehicles phone before crossing

Drivers of large or slow vehicles phone before crossing

Open railway crossing without signals

Level crossing without gates or barriers

Another train coming if lights continue to show

Risk of grounding

Drivers of large or slow vehicles to phone before crossing

Park here and use phone at crossing

Railway crossing countdown marker

Railway crossing countdown marker

Railway crossing countdown marker

Railway crossing countdown marker

Railway crossing countdown marker

Railway crossing countdown marker

Cross only when green light shows

Look out for trains

Look out for trains (2 tracks)

== Information signs ==
Slow vehicle lane ahead

Slow vehicle lane in 1 km

Overtaking lane in 300 m

Overtaking lane in 1 km

Slow vehicle turnout in 300 m

Slow vehicle turnout

Slow vehicle turnout

Slower vehicles use turnouts next

Toll rate

Truck route

Weighbridge ahead

New road layout ahead

New junction ahead

New pedestrian crossing ahead

New traffic signals ahead

New roundabout ahead

No left turn ahead

No right turn ahead

No U-turn ahead

Emergency roadside telephone

Emergency roadside telephone

Emergency roadside telephone

Fire engine hard standing

Fire engine access - keep clear

Abnormal loads - wait here

Divided roadway ahead

Divided roadway in 2 km

Entry

No exit

No entry

Exit

Traffic signal cameras

Truck parking area

Pedestrian crossing

Pedestrian signal instruction

Cyclists dismount

Exit to the left

Exit to the right

Exit to either side

Freeway/expressway symbol

Locality

End of locality

Police - accident

Police - slow

Police - fire
