= Jassim Saif al-Sulaiti =

Qatari politician

Jassim bin Saif bin Ahmed al-Sulaiti
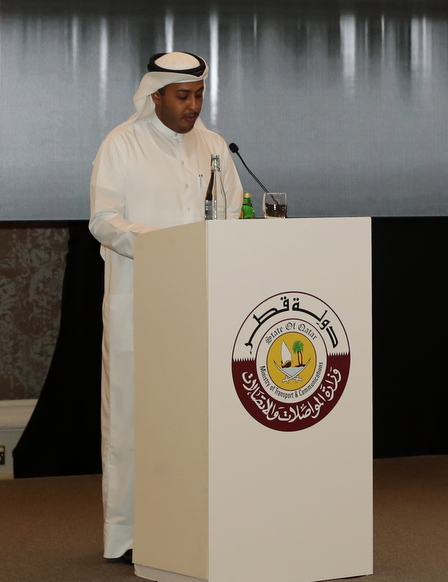

Minister of Transport
- In office 26 June 2013 – 12 November 2024
- Monarch: Tamim bin Hamad Al Thani
- Prime Minister: Abdullah bin Nasser bin Khalifa Al Thani; Khalid bin Khalifa bin Abdul Aziz Al Thani; Mohammed bin Abdulrahman bin Jassim Al Thani
- Succeeded by: Mohammed bin Abdullah bin Mohammed Al Thani

Minister of Transport and Communications
- In office January 2016 – October 2021
- Monarch: Tamim bin Hamad Al Thani
- Prime Minister: Abdullah bin Nasser Al Thani; Khalid bin Khalifa bin Abdul Aziz Al Thani
- Succeeded by: Mohammed bin Ali bin Mohammed al-Mannai

Jassim bin Saif bin Ahmed al-Sulaiti is a Qatari politician. Previously, he had served as Minister of Transport from 26 June 2013 until 12 November 2024.

== Education ==
Al-Sulaiti holds a Bachelor of Mechanical Engineering (1985) and a Master of Military Science (1997).

== Career ==
Prior to working as minister, al-Sulaiti served in the Qatar Armed Forces as Brigadier General and Commander of the Maintenance Arms. He is the chairman of Qatar Ports Management and QTerminals.

Between January 2016 and October 2021, al-Sulaiti served as Minister of Transport and Communications.

== Honours ==
Al-Sulaiti was made Commander of the Legion of Honour in 2016.
