= Saad Al-Kharji =

Chairman of Qatar Tourism

Saad Bin Ali Al Kharji a.k.a. Saad Al-Kharji is the chairman of Qatar Tourism. He is notable as one of the top Middle East hospitality and tourism leaders.

== Early life ==
Al-Kharji graduated from Qatar University with a degree of Bachelor of Business Administration.

== Career ==
He served as director of the Office of the Minister of Foreign Affairs and director of the Prime Minister's Office.
