= Badr Mohammed Al Meer =

Qatari Airline executive

Badr Mohammed Al-Meer
- بدر محمد المير
- Citizenship: Qatar
- Education: American University of Beirut; University of Colorado Denver
- Occupation: Former CEO of Qatar Airways

CEO of Qatar Airways
- In office November 5, 2023 – December 7, 2025
- Preceded by: Akbar Al Baker
- Succeeded by: Hamad Ali Al-Khater

Badr Mohammed Al Meer is a Qatari business officeholder who served as the CEO of Qatar Airways from November 5, 2023 until December 7, 2025. He was announced as the new CEO of the airline following the resignation of longtime CEO Akbar Al Baker after 27 years. He previously served as chief operating officer of Hamad International Airport. He is an engineer by training.

== Career ==
Before being selected as the new CEO of Qatar Airways, Al Meer was chief operating officer of Hamad International Airport which he joined in June 2014. While at the airport, Al Meer was involved in efforts to implement a "smart airport" vision including usage of biometrics, robotics, and blockchain. He was recognized as a top travel leader in the region during his tenure and the airport won awards from Skytrax.

Prior to Hamad International Airport, Al Meer worked for nine years at the United Development Company, a major construction company in Qatar, including a stint as its acting CEO. He also had a previous stint at Qatar Airways serving as senior vice president of the facilities management and capital projects divisions for the group.

== Education ==
Al Meer holds degrees in engineering from the American University of Beirut and the University of Colorado Denver.
