= Issa bin Saad Al Jafali Al Nuaimi =

Qatari politician

Attorney General
- Incumbent
- Assumed office 17 June 2021
- Monarch: Tamim bin Hamad Al Thani
- Prime Minister: Khalid bin Khalifa bin Abdulaziz Al Thani

Minister of Justice and Minister of State for the Council of Ministers Affairs
- In office 2018 – 17 June 2021
- Prime Minister: Abdullah bin Nasser bin Khalifa Al Thani; Khalid bin Khalifa bin Abdulaziz Al Thani
- Succeeded by: Masoud bin Mohammed Al Ameri

Issa bin Saad Al Jafali Al Nuaimi is the Qatari Attorney General. Previously he had served as the Minister of Justice and Minister of State for the Council of Ministers Affairs from 2018 until 2021. He was succeeded Masoud al Ameri.
