= Akbar Al Baker =

CEO of Qatar Airways from 1997 to 2023

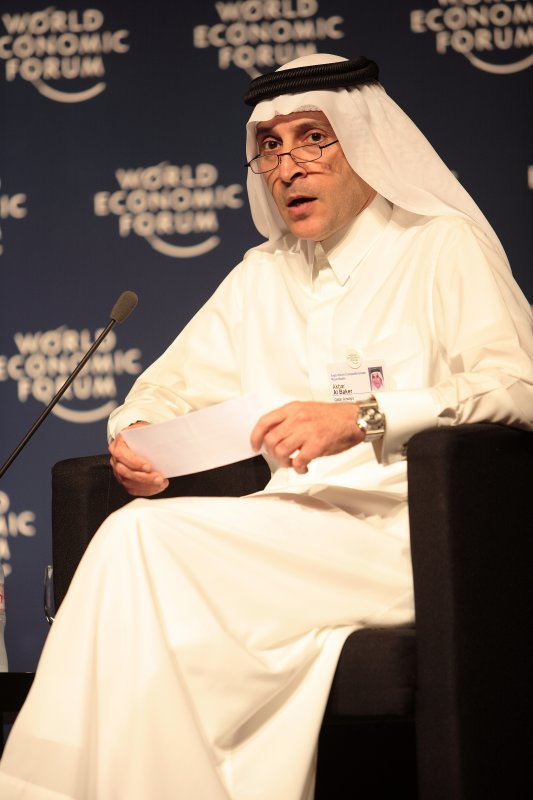
- Akbar Al Baker in 2009
- Born: 1962 (age 63–64); Doha, Qatar
- Education: Sydenham College of Commerce and Economics
- Years active: 1997–5 November 2023

CEO of Qatar Airways
- In office 1997 – November 5, 2023
- Preceded by: office created
- Succeeded by: Badr Mohammed Al Meer

Chairman of Qatar Tourism
- In office July 17, 2019 – October 22, 2023
- Preceded by: Hassan Al Ibrahim
- Succeeded by: Saad Ali Al Kharji

Akbar Al Baker (Arabic: أكبر الباکر; born 1962) is a Qatari businessman who is the former CEO of Qatar Airways. He was also the chairman of Qatar Tourism until October 22, 2023. Under Qatar Airways Group, Al-Baker was also the CEO of Hamad International Airport, which opened in 2014.

== Early life and education ==
Al-Baker was born in Doha, Qatar. As a child, he studied at St. Peter's School, a boarding school, in the Panchgani hills in Maharashtra, India. He later moved to Mumbai and graduated from Sydenham College of Commerce and Economics. He holds a private pilot license.

== Career ==
Al-Baker became chief executive officer of Qatar Airways in 1997. Prior to this appointment, he worked at the Civil Aviation Directorate of Qatar. He is also the former chairman of the Qatar Tourism Authority. He is CEO of several divisions of Qatar's national airline, including Qatar Executive, Qatar Airways Holidays, Qatar Aviation Services, Qatar Duty Free Company, Doha International Airport, Internal Media Services, Qatar Distribution Company and Qatar Aircraft Catering Company.

Al-Baker led the development of Hamad International Airport, which opened its first phase in May 2014 and is now home to Qatar Airways. As of 2017 the airport services all inbound and outbound flights out of Doha.

In June 2019, Al Baker announced that Qatar Airways would be buying a stake in a sixth overseas airline before the end of the year. The company has not yet been named, but would join the airlines interests on the International Airlines Group, LATAM Airlines Group, Cathay Pacific, and China Southern Airlines Co.

Al-Baker is a member of the executive committee of the Arab Air Carriers' Organization, a member of the board of governors of the International Air Transport Association, and a non-executive director of Heathrow Airport Holdings.

In May 2021, Al-Baker was appointed to the role of governing board chairman of the Oneworld alliance.

In October 2023, Al Baker announced that he would be stepping down as CEO of Qatar Airways after nearly 27 years leading the company. The resignation will take effect on November 5, 2023. His announcement came just one day after he was replaced as chairman of Qatar Tourism by his protege Saad bin Ali Al Kharji, who previously served as vice chair under Al-Baker.

== Controversies ==
In 2015, it was reported that Qatar Airways told its female flight attendants that they could lose their jobs if they were pregnant.

On August 26, 2015, Qatar airways updated its policy on marriage and pregnancy for its female cabin crew. In June, after the International Labour Organization's (ILO) report on Qatar to change its employment rules to end discrimination, Qatar Airways has loosened its restrictions prohibiting female cabin crew from getting married and having children. Pregnant women will now be provided temporary ground jobs under the new contract and they can get married whenever they choose as long as they notify the company.

In May 2016, The Daily Telegraph reported that Al Baker said backpackers were not welcome in Qatar because they "are just there to lie on the beach and spend as little as possible" and the country wanted to "attract people of higher standard".

In July 2017, in a speech at a dinner in Ireland, Al Baker said US airlines were "crap" and their passengers were "always being served by grandmothers". He stated that the average age of Qatar Airways cabin crew was 26. He later said that his remarks might not reflect his "true sentiments about cabin crew".

On June 5, 2018, speaking at a press conference following his election to chairman of the International Air Transport Association at the association's annual meeting in Sydney, Australia, he told reporters that, regarding Qatar Airways' management, "Of course it has to be led by a man because it is a very challenging position." Although Al-Baker later apologized, he stopped short of recanting his belief that being CEO of an international airline is too challenging a job for a woman. He claimed he was attempting to make a joke at the time.

In 2019, Al-Baker alleged that Changi Airport's Jewel was a copy of previously announced expansion plans for Hamad International Airport. Al-Baker was quoted as saying: "When I show you the images later (of the planned enhancements), you will realize that somebody copied our design, which was already on the table nearly six years ago... We had individuals from that country, I will not name it, that took our design and did it." Changi Airport Group's chief executive, Lee Seow Hiang, however, has rebutted the allegation, telling The Straits Times: "We value the originality and creativity of ideas as we innovate to elevate the Changi experience for all our visitors. We respect intellectual property rights and expect the same of all our partners."
