= Abdulla bin Abdulaziz bin Turki al-Subaie =

Qatari politician

Minister of Municipality
- In office 19 October 2021 – 7 January 2024
- Monarch: Tamim bin Hamad Al Thani
- Prime Minister: Khalid bin Khalifa bin Abdul Aziz Al Thani
- Preceded by: Abdul Rahman bin Khalifa Al Thani
- Succeeded by: Abdullah bin Hamad bin Abdullah al-Attiya

Minister of Environment and Climate Change
- Incumbent
- Assumed office 8 January 2024
- Monarch: Tamim bin Hamad Al Thani
- Prime Minister: Khalid bin Khalifa bin Abdul Aziz Al Thani
- Preceded by: Faleh bin Nasser bin Ahmed bin Ali Al Thani

Personal details
- Born: 1975 (age 50–51)
- Education: Qatar University (MBA, PhD)

Abdulla bin Abdulaziz bin Turki al-Subaie (born 1975) is the Qatari Minister of Environment and Climate Change. He was appointed as minister on 8 January 2024. Previously he had served as Minister of Municipality.

== Education ==
Al-Subaie holds a Bachelor of Electrical Engineering (1996), a Master of Business Administration (2006) and a PhD of Administration from the Qatar University.

== Career ==
Between 1996 and 2008, al-Subaie worked for the Qatar General Electricity and Water Corporation. He was the chief executive officer of Smeet, a subsidiary of Qatari Diar, from 2008 until 2011.

From April 2011 to May 2014, he worked as the group chief executive officer for Barwa, a real estate development and investment holding group.

In March 2011, al-Subaie was appointed the managing director of Qatar Rail. From January 2017 until May 2024, he was the chief executive officer of Qatar Rail.

Between 19 October 2021 and 7 January 2024, he was the minister of municipality.

Since 8 January 2024, al-Subaie has served as minister of environment and climate change.

He was named on Forbes Sustainability Leaders in Government 2025 list.
