= Abdullah bin Hamad bin Abdullah al-Attiya =

Qatari politician

Minister of Municipality
- Incumbent
- Assumed office 8 January 2024
- Monarch: Tamim bin Hamad Al Thani
- Prime Minister: Mohammed bin Abdulrahman bin Jassim Al Thani
- Preceded by: Abdulla bin Abdulaziz bin Turki al-Subaie

Personal details
- Education: Cardiff University (B.Sc.); University of Nottingham (M.Sc.)

Abdullah bin Hamad bin Abdullah al-Attiya is the Qatari Minister of Municipality. He was appointed as minister on 8 January 2024.

== Education ==
Al-Attiya holds a Bachelor in Mechanical Engineering from Cardiff University and a Master in Chemical Engineering from the University of Nottingham.

== Career ==
Al-Attiya worked as an engineer at Qatar Petroleum until 2011, when he started working for RasGas, where he became planning manager in 2012.

In 2014, he was Acting Executive Director of the program management office of Qatar’s Supreme Committee for Delivery and Legacy.

In 2015, he was appointed Director of the technical office and later Vice President of the Public Works Authority (Ashgal).

In 2018, he was appointed CEO of Qatari Diar Real Estate Investment Company. Additionally, he was appointed Vice Chairman to the Board of Directors of Barwa Real Estate Company and then Chairman of the board in 2023.

In 2021, al-Attiya was appointed Deputy Chairman of Katara Hospitality. Additionally, he has been a member of the Board of Directors of the United Development Company and Qatar Free Zones Authority since 2022 and Vice President of the Board of Directors at Al Sadd Sports Club.

Since 8 January 2024, al-Attiya has been the Minister of Municipality.
