= Buthaina bint Ali al-Jabr al-Nuaimi =

Qatari Minister of Social Development and Family

Buthaina Bint Ali al-Jabr al-Nuaimi
- بثينة بنت علي الجبر النعيمي

Minister of Social Development and Family
- Incumbent
- Assumed office 12 November 2024
- Monarch: Tamim bin Hamad Al Thani
- Prime Minister: Mohammed bin Abdulrahman bin Jassim Al Thani
- Preceded by: Maryam bint Ali bin Nasser al-Misnad

Minister of Education and Higher Education
- In office 19 October 2021 – 12 November 2024
- Monarch: Tamim bin Hamad Al Thani
- Prime Minister: Khalid bin Khalifa bin Abdul Aziz Al Thani; Mohammed bin Abdulrahman bin Jassim Al Thani
- Preceded by: Mohammed Abdul Wahed Al Hammadi
- Succeeded by: Lolwah bint Rashid bin Mohammed Al Khater

Personal details
- Education: Qatar University (B); HEC Paris (EMBA)

Buthaina Bint Ali al-Jabr al-Nuaimi is the Qatari Minister of Social Development and Family. Previously, she had served as Minister of Education and Higher Education from 19 October 2021 until 12 November 2024.

== Education ==
Al Nuaimi holds a Bachelor of Arts and Education from the Qatar University and an Executive Master of Business Administration from the HEC Paris.

== Career ==
Until 2006, Al Nuaimi worked as a teacher and was head of department and vice principal at Qatari schools. In 2006, she started working for the Qatar Foundation. From 2016 until 2021, Al Nuaimi was the President of Pre-University Education at Qatar Foundation.

Between 19 October 2021 and 12 November 2024, Al Nuaimi had served as Minister of Education and Higher Education.

On 7 November 2023, Al Nuaimi attended the 42nd session of the UNESCO General Conference. She hold a speech at the opening of the conference on the importance of education for achieving the Sustainable Development Goals.

Since 12 November 2024, Al Nuaimi has served as Minister of Social Development and Family.
