= Faleh bin Nasser bin Ahmed bin Ali Al Thani =

Qatari Minister of Environment and Climate Change

Minister of Environment and Climate Change
- In office 19 October 2021 – 8 January 2024
- Monarch: Tamim bin Hamad Al Thani
- Prime Minister: Khalid bin Khalifa bin Abdulaziz Al Thani
- Succeeded by: Abdulla bin Abdulaziz bin Turki Al Subaie

Personal details
- Education: University of Hertfordshire (PhD)

Sheikh Faleh bin Nasser bin Ahmed bin Ali Al Thani is a Qatari politician. He served as Minister of Environment and Climate Change from 19 October 2021 until 8 January 2024.

== Education ==
Sheikh Faleh holds PhDs in Water Resources Management and Solar Water Desalination from the University of Hertfordshire in the United Kingdom.

== Career ==
From 2005 until 2021, Al Thani was Undersecretary of Agricultural and Fisheries Affairs at the Municipality of Environment.

He has served as the head of the Standing Committee on Farms and Wells since 2006, the Standing Committee on Living Aquatic Resources since 2011, and the National Food Security Program of Qatar since 2017.

From 19 October 2021 until 8 January 2024, Al Thani served as Minister of Environment and Climate Change.
