= Sultan bin Saad al-Muraikhi =

Qatari politician

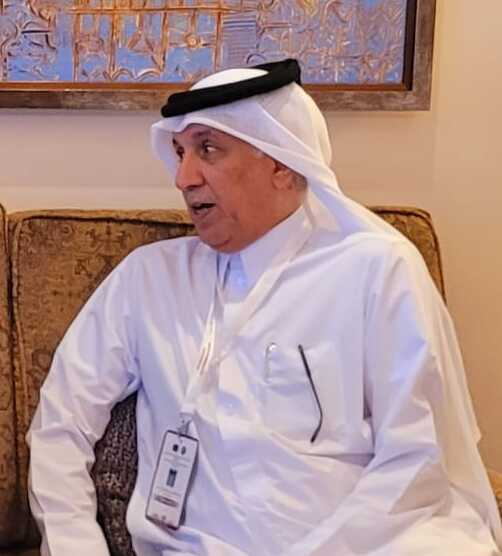
- Sultan bin Saad al-Muraikhi in 2023

State Minister for Foreign Affairs
- Incumbent
- Assumed office 30 June 2016
- Monarch: Tamim bin Hamad Al Thani
- Prime Minister: Abdullah bin Nasser bin Khalifa Al Thani; Khalid bin Khalifa bin Abdul Aziz Al Thani; Mohammed bin Abdulrahman bin Jassim Al Thani

Personal details
- Born: 1957 (age 68–69)

Sultan bin Saad al-Muraikhi (born 1957) is the Qatari State Minister for Foreign Affairs. He was appointed as minister on 30 June 2016 and was made a member of the cabinet on 8 January 2024.

== Education ==
Al-Muraikhi holds a Bachelor of Political Science.

== Career ==
Al-Muraikhi started his career at the Ministry of Foreign Affairs in 1984 as a secretary.

From 1988 until 1990, he was Assistant of the Director of the Minister of State for Foreign Affairs, and until 1994, he served as Director of the Office of the Ministry’s Undersecretaryship.

Between 1994 and 2000, he worked at the Qatari embassy in Washington and the consulate in Houston.

From 2000 until 2005, he worked at the Amiri Diwan.

From 2005 until 2013, al-Muraikhi served as ambassador of Qatar in Italy. Additionally, he was the permanent representative of Qatar to the UN in Rome.

In 2013, he was appointed Ambassador in Greece.

In March 2016, al-Muraikhi returned to the Ministry of Foreign Affairs and was appointed as assistant to the minister.

Since June 2016, al-Muraikhi has been State Minister for Foreign Affairs.

In January 2024, he was made a member of the cabinet.
