= Ahmed bin Saif Al Thani =

Qatari royal (born 1946)

Sheikh Ahmed
- Sheikh of Qatar
- Born: 1946 (age 79–80); Doha, Qatar
- Issue: Sheikha Aliya bint Ahmed bin Saif; Sheikh Saif bin Ahmed bin Saif; Sheikh Muhammad bin Ahmed bin Saif; Sheikha Shua'a bint Ahmed bin Saif; Sheikha Nouf bint Ahmed bin Saif; Sheikha Dr. Dena bint Ahmed bin Saif; Sheikha Lamia bint Ahmed bin Saif
- Ahmed bin Saif bin Ahmed bin Muhammed Al Thani
- House: Thani
- Father: Saif bin Ahmed bin Muhammed Al Thani

Styles of Sheikh Ahmed bin Saif bin Ahmed bin Muhammed Al Thani
- Reference style: His Excellency
- Spoken style: Your Excellency
- Alternative style: Sheikh

Sheikh Ahmed bin Saif bin Ahmed bin Muhammed Al Thani, GBE (born 1946) is a Qatari royal. He is the grandson of Sheikh Ahmed bin Muhammed Al Thani.

== Career ==
He was educated at University of London.

Al Thani has held the following posts:

- Ambassador of Qatar at the Court of St James's 1972–1973 in Netherlands.
- Ambassador in Sweden 1973–1975.
- Ambassador in Norway 1975–1977.
- In 1978, the ruler Sheikh Khalifa bin Hamad Al Thani appointed him as the Minister of State for Foreign Affairs 1978–1989.
- Minister for Justice 1989–1995.
- Minister of State without portfolio since 1995.

== Children ==
- Sheikha Aliya bint Ahmed bin Saif (born in 1974)
- Sheikh Saif bin Ahmed bin Saif (born in 1984)
- Sheikh Muhammad bin Ahmed bin Saif (born in 1990)
- Sheikha Shua'a bint Ahmed bin Saif
- Sheikha Nouf bint Ahmed bin Saif
- Sheikha Dr. Dena bint Ahmed bin Saif
- Sheikha Lamia bint Ahmed bin Saif
