= Arab Democracy Foundation =

Qatari-based nonprofit organization

- المؤسسة العربية للديمقراطية
- Formation: 27 May 2007
- Type: Nonprofit organization
- Purpose: Democracy, human rights
- Headquarters: Doha, Qatar
- Region served: Arab region
- Secretary General: Mohsen Marzouk
- Founder and Chair of the Board of Trustees: Moza bint Nasser
- Website: http://www.adf.org.qa/ [defunct]

The Arab Democracy Foundation (ADF) (sometimes: Arab Foundation for Democracy) is an Arab nonprofit organization established and chaired by Moza bint Nasser, wife of then-Emir of Qatar Hamad bin Khalifa Al Thani and mother of current Emir Tamim bin Hamad, in May 2007. It was founded with a $10 million fund courtesy of the Qatari state following the second "Forum on Democracy and Political Reform in the Arab World", organized by the National Human Rights Committee and sponsored by the Emir. Its stated mission is "advocating for democracy as a culture, a way of life, and the best system for good governance". Qatar itself remains an authoritarian monarchy under the rule of the Al Thani royal family.

== Founding ==
The second "Forum on Democracy and Political Reform in the Arab World" was held in Doha from 27 to 29 May 2007, sponsored by then-Emir Hamad bin Khalifa Al Thani and inaugurated by his son, then-heir apparent and current Emir as of 2025, Tamim bin Hamad Al Thani. On the third day of the conference, in a session attended by many senior government officials, Sheikha Moza bint Nasser Al-Missned, wife of Hamad and mother of Tamim, announced the establishment of the ADF, and by July of the same year she was signed as founder and first member of the board on an Amiri Decree approving the establishment of the foundation.

== Mission and resources ==
ADF aims at promoting democracy in the Arab region. It provides material and moral support to organizations and activists in this field, by using all possible peaceful means, and by channeling all human and financial resources available at the local, regional and international levels. ADF also seeks to disseminate the culture of human rights and to increase the citizens’ awareness of, and commitment to, their legitimate rights. ADF uses all ways and means that fall in line with its objectives. It does not side with, or acts against, any Arab regime.

ADF resources come from the contributions of its founders, as well as from donations, grants, endowments, subscriptions, earnings, and other forms of financial support approved the board of trustees.

== Management ==
The Forum on Democracy and Reform in the Arab World, held every three years, serves as a general assembly from which the ADF Board of Trustees emanates.

Board of trustees

The highest executive body of the ADF. It is currently composed of 15 members. The board of trustees (BoT) draws the ADF general policy, adopts its plan of action and budget, appoints its senior officials, and regularly reviews the programs and projects included in its plan of action. The BoT meets at least once a year. An executive committee, composed of board members, acts for the board during the interim between BoT meetings.

H.H. Moza bint Nasser is currently the chair of the board, with Dr. Salim El Hoss as her vice-chair. Until 26 January 2009, the late Dr. Aziz Sidqi was the board's vice-chair.

The other trustees are: Dr. Ali Fakhro, Dr. Khalid bin Mohamed al-Attiyah, Emma Bonino, Dr. Saad Eddin Ibrahim, Mary Robinson, Dr. Hasan Al-Ibrahim, Ely Ould Mohamed Vall, Dr. Mohammed Abed al-Jabri, Joschka Fischer, Sadiq al-Mahdi, Dr. Azmi Bishara, and Amat Al Alim Alsoswa.

Executive committee

The board members choose from among them a five-member executive committee, headed by the board president or her deputy, or by any other member chosen by the board. The secretary-general of ADF is also member of the executive committee. The executive committee has the full authority of the board of trustees, and is directly responsible before the board. The committee meets at least four times a year, upon the invitation of its president or his deputy. The executive committee follows up the work of the Secretariat General and the ADF, and submits periodic reports to the board of trustees. For the purposes of its work, the executive committee may create specialized, ad hoc or standing, committees.

Dr. Ali Fakhro currently chairs the executive committee which includes: Dr. Khalid bin Mohamed al-Attiyah, Dr. Hasan Al-Ibrahim, and Dr. Saad Eddin Ibrahim, as well as the secretary-general.

Secretariat-General

The executive body of the ADF, headed by a full-time Secretary-General, pursuant to a board decision. The secretariat-general includes divisions in charge of program and research, financial and administrative affairs, public relations and information.

Dr. Ali Ben Smaikh al-Marry served as ADF's first secretary-general (May 2007-March 2008). Mohsen Marzouk is ADF's second and current secretary-general (March 2008–present).
