= Alya Ahmed Saif Al-Thani =

Qatari diplomat

- علياء بنت أحمد آل ثاني
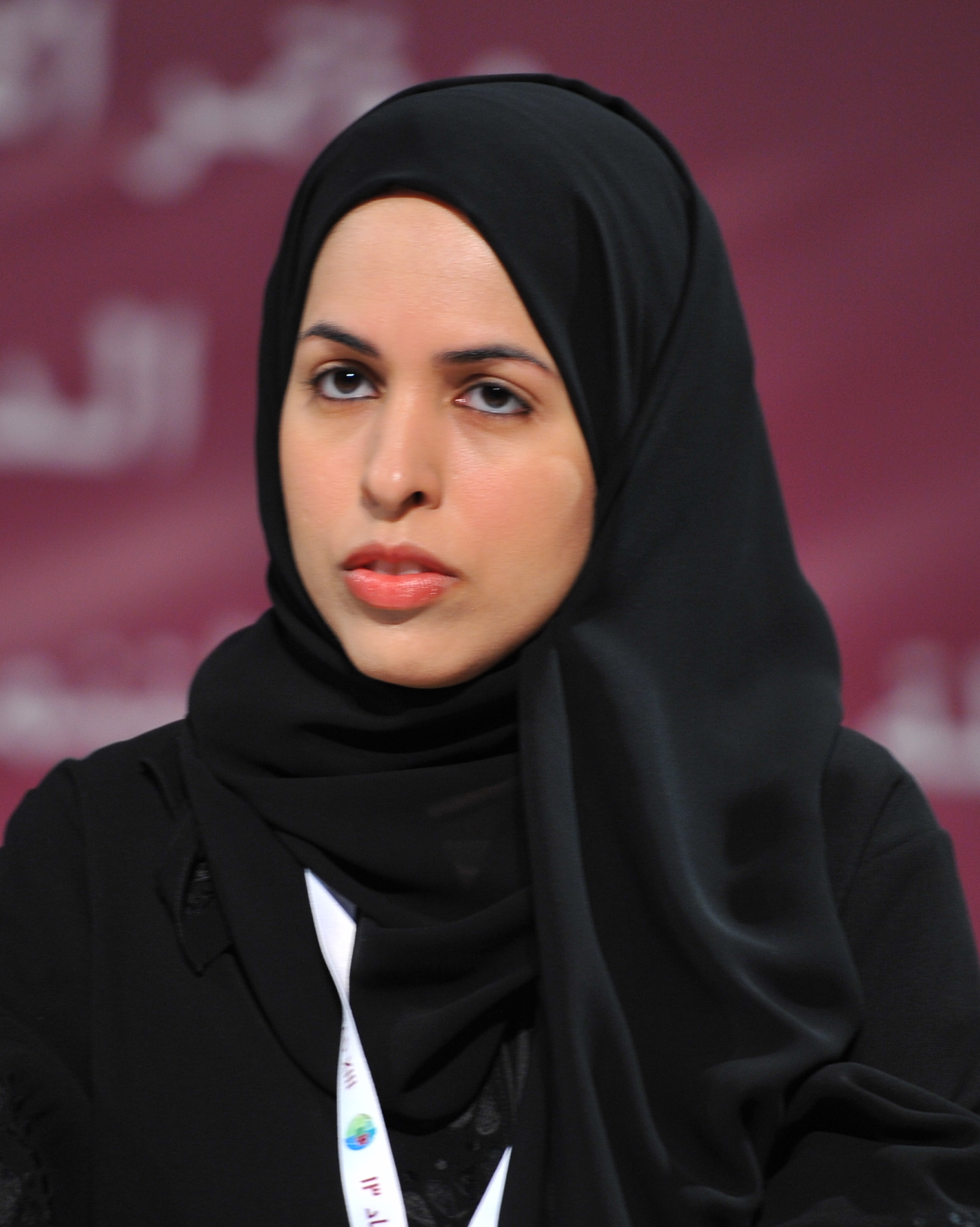
- Al-Thani in 2012

Permanent Representative of the State of Qatar to the United Nations
- Incumbent
- Assumed office 24 October 2013
- Preceded by: Meshal Hamad M.J. Al-Thani

Personal details
- Born: Alya Ahmed Saif Al-Thani Doha, Qatar
- Parent: Ahmed bin Saif Al Thani (father)
- Education: SOAS, University of London and Qatar University

Sheikha Alya Ahmed Saif Al-Thani (Arabic: علياء بنت أحمد آل ثاني; is a Qatari diplomat who currently serves as the Permanent Representative of the State of Qatar to the United Nations.

== Early life and education ==
Her father, Sheikh Ahmed bin Saif Al-Thani, is a former diplomat. Her uncle also served as a diplomat. She graduated with a B.S. in economics from Qatar University and obtained a M.A. in international studies and diplomacy from SOAS, University of London in 2006. She is the first woman to serve as Permanent Representative of the State of Qatar to the United Nations.

== Career ==
From October 2003 to May 2004, she served as a senior specialist in the General Secretariat of the International Relations Department of the Board of Governors.

Al-Thani subsequently served as Deputy Director from June 2004 to August 2006, and later as director of the child's rights division of the Supreme Council for Family Affairs from September 2006 to March 2007.

She became a counselor for UN affairs from April 2007 to May 2009, before becoming an Envoy in June 2009. She also served as deputy Permanent Representative of Qatar to the UN from May 2010 to July 2011.

In August 2011, she became the Ambassador to the Cabinet of the Ministry of Foreign Affairs, a position she held until October 2011.

=== Permanent Representative to the United Nations in Geneva ===
From 2011 to 2013, she served as Ambassador and Permanent Representative of the State of Qatar to the European headquarters of the United Nations in Geneva, the World Trade Organization (WTO), and as the General Consul of the State of Qatar to the Swiss Federation.

In 2013, Al-Thani was named a Young Global Leader by the World Economic Forum.

=== Permanent Representative to the United Nations HQ ===
On 24 October 2013, she was announced as the Permanent Representative of the State of Qatar to the United Nations in New York.

In 2017, she chaired the fiftieth session of the United Nations Commission on Population and Development and co-facilitated the meetings to assess the Global Plan of Action to Combat Trafficking in Persons.

In 2018, she co-facilities the intergovernmental consultations to review the reform of the United Nations Economic and Social Council.

In June 2021, she was appointed vice president of the seventy-sixth session of the United Nations General Assembly.

In November 2021, Al-Thani was appointed by Abdulla Shahid, President of the 76th United Nations General Assembly, to co-chair the intergovernmental negotiations on the United Nations Security Council reform.

In 2022, Csaba Kőrösi, president of the 77th United Nations General Assembly, appointed her to conduct consultations on the political declaration to be adopted by the SDG Summit in September 2023.

She has authored and facilitated several United Nations General Assembly Resolutions, such as the Resolution welcoming the 2022 FIFA World Cup in Qatar, the International Day to Protect Education From Attack, which followed the adoption of a Resolution on the Right to Education in Emergencies ten years earlier, a Resolution on an International Day of Women Judges and on World Autism Awareness Day, and a Resolution on improving the effectiveness and coordination of military and civil assets for natural disaster response.

She started important United Nations Groups of Friends, and co-chairs the Group of Friends for Gender Parity, the Group of Friends for the Responsibility to Protect, the Group of Friends to Assist on the International, Impartial, and Independent Mechanism (IIIM) to help investigate crimes committed in Syria, the Group of Friends for Education and Lifelong Learning, the Group of Friends for Solidarity for Global Health Security, and the Group of Friends for the Responsibility to Protect.

Al-Thani sits on the boards of several international human rights, sustainable development, and women's rights organizations.

She has won several awards, including being nominated as a Young Global Leader to improve the state of the world by the World Economic Forum in 2013. She has written opinion pieces, as well as the foreword to the book, Overcoming Smallness: Challenges and Opportunities for Small States in Global Affairs (2022).

== See also ==
- List of current permanent representatives to the United Nations
- Sheikha Moza bint Nasser
