= Executive master's degree =

Advanced Master's degree

An executive master's degree, also known as a Master of Advanced Studies (MAS), is an advanced level of master's degree designed specially for mid-career executive professionals.

== Structure ==
Executive master's degree programs are usually attended by full-time working professionals, therefore the programs are scheduled to match this condition. Most programs run several full days (not more than a week) per month for the period of two or three years. However, some options have similarly adapted schedules, offering classes nights or weekends only. The most condensed of such programs can be completed in as little as a year.

According to the Bologna Process, program participants are required to gain 60 ECTS to complete the degree. In other systems, the duration of the program is dependent on the total number of academic credits and the number of course credits it is possible to complete in a given semester. Programs within the United States typically require 33 credits according to the U.S. Department of Education. The number may differ from one credit system to another. By the end of the program participants of the program are required to have completed a thesis or a field project, on which they should usually spend 350–500 hours.

== Admission ==
Applicants for an executive master program typically must have:

- A bachelor's degree or high school diploma;
- 4-15 years of work experience in their area of study (or a comparable background and expressed passion for the specific subject area);
- Leadership potential

Admission requirements may slightly differ from country to country. Some universities or private institutions may require GMAT, GRE or other standardized mathematical test scores.

In the UK the Executive Master's degree (; https://msbm.org.uk/programme/special-executive-masters-programme-in-business-management; https://www.lse.ac.uk/study-at-lse/executive-masters-degrees/about) are accredited degrees that require a Bachelor's degree and a minimum of 4/5 years of experience in a management position.
