= Ministry of Justice (Qatar) =

Government ministry of Qatar

The Ministry of Justice (Arabic: وزارة العدل) is a Qatari government ministry responsible for legal affairs. Its duties include supervising the legal profession, registering real estate, and authenticating official documents. Established in 1970 as part of Qatar's first cabinet, the ministry also represents state and government agencies in legal proceedings and reviews draft government contracts and agreements. The ministry is also responsible for publishing the Official Gazette.

The current minister is Ibrahim bin Ali bin Issa al-Hassan al-Mohannadi, who was appointed in January 2024.

== History ==
The Ministry of Justice was established in 1970 as part of Qatar's first cabinet, as set out in Law No. 5 of that year. It succeeded the Department of Legal Affairs, which was established in 1962 to handle legal matters within the government. In the early 2000s, Qatar restructured its judicial system. Previously, civil courts were overseen by the Ministry of Justice, while Sharia courts were overseen by the Ministry of Awqaf and Islamic Affairs. However, the 2003 Judicial Authority Law brought the two systems together under the Supreme Judicial Council. The Centre for Legal and Judicial Studies was established by Law No. 8 of 2001 and began providing training in 2002. In 2014, it became part of the Ministry of Justice. It provides professional training for judges, prosecutors, lawyers and other legal professionals.

In June 2017, the ministry introduced the third phase of its SAK electronic registration and authentication system, extending its scope to include property sales and mortgage transactions with banks. Then, in November 2024, the ministry launched a pilot programme for digital legal services, enabling certain documents to be authenticated remotely via the SAK portal and Qatar's digital identity system (QDI).

== Responsibilities ==
- Supervising the practice of law in Qatar.
- Providing legal representation for Qatar and its government bodies in domestic and international legal proceedings, including cases initiated by or against them.
- Overseeing the registration of legal processes.
- Reviewing contracts undertaken by other governmental bodies.
- Increasing awareness of the law, providing legal training for government employees, and monitoring any law-related professions.

== List of ministers (Post-1971 upon achieving independence) ==
- 'Abd al-Rahman ibn Sa'ud al-Thani (1971–1975)*
- Ahmed bin Saif Al Thani (1989–1992)
- Ahmed bin Saif Al Thani (1992–1995)
- Najeeb Al Nuaimi (1995–1997)
- Ahmad bin Muhammad Ali al-Subayi (1997–1999) [Acting]
- Hasan bin Abdallah al-Ghanim (1999–2013)
- Hassan Lahdan Saqr Al Mohannadi (2013–2018)
- Issa bin Saad Al Jafali Al Nuaimi (2018–2021)
- Masoud bin Mohammed Al Ameri (2021–2024)
- Ibrahim bin Ali bin Issa Al Hassan Al Mohannadi (2024–present)

*The ministry post appears to have been vacant from 1975 to 1989, based on various sources.

== See also ==
- Justice ministry
- Politics of Qatar
