= Qatar Tourism Authority =

Part of Qatar government responsible for tourism

Qatar Tourism
Agency overview
- Jurisdiction: State of Qatar
- Headquarters: Qatar Tourism; 24624 Lusail Expy, Doha, Qatar
- Minister responsible: Saad Ali Al Kharji
- Website: www.visitqatar.qa

Qatar Tourism (QT) (Arabic: قطر للسياحة/الهيئة العامة للسياحة), a branch of the Government of Qatar, is the apex body responsible for the formulation and administration of the rules, regulations and laws relating to the development and promotion of tourism in Qatar. This ministry is responsible for tourist attractions and accommodations for travelers, including all tourism related products and services, to expand and diversify of Qatar's tourism industry, as well as building up the role of tourism in the GDP of the country and its future growth and social development.

QT’s work is guided by the Qatar National Tourism Sector Strategy 2030 (QNTSS), published in February 2014, to set out a plan for the industry’s future development.

== Operations ==
In an initiative to become the Middle East's fastest-growing tourist destination, Qatar's tourism authority unveiled the nation's largest-ever worldwide marketing campaign called the Qatar National Vision 2030. In order to promote the world-class destination as the opening of more than 100 new hotels nears for the FIFA World Cup Qatar 2022, a new, dedicated website and mobile app were established in April 2021.

By 2030, the plan aims to draw more than 6 million tourists annually, from which 3 million visited only at the world cup hosted. Qatar received 1.5 million tourists during the first half of 2023, according to reporting by Gulf Times.

Qatar is expected to host the Qatar Grand Prix, motor shows, International Horticultural Expo 2023 and other events in 2023.
