= Masoud bin Mohammed al-Ameri =

Qatari politician

Masoud bin Mohamed al-Ameri

Minister of Justice
- In office 17 June 2021 – 8 January 2024
- Monarch: Tamim bin Hamad Al Thani
- Prime Minister: Khalid bin Khalifa bin Abdul Aziz Al Thani; Mohammed bin Abdulrahman bin Jassim Al Thani
- Preceded by: Issa bin Saad Al Jafali al-Nuaimi
- Succeeded by: Ibrahim bin Ali bin Issa al-Hassan al-Mohannadi

Personal details
- Education: Washington College of Law (M.L.)

Masoud bin Mohammed al-Ameri is a Qatari politician. Previously he had served as Minister of Justice from 17 June 2021 until 8 January 2024.

== Education ==
Al-Ameri holds a Bachelor of Laws from the Cairo University and a Master of Laws in International Legal Studies from Washington College of Law.

== Career ==
From 1983 until 1986, al-Ameri served as a judicial assistant in courts.

Between 1986 and 1997, he served as a judge. In March 1997, al-Ameri was nominated as a judge for the International Criminal Tribunal for the Former Yugoslavia. In addition, al-Ameri was appointed vice president of the Court of Appeal in 1997.

In 2002, al-Ameri worked for the Public Prosecution Office of Qatar. From 2003 until 2008, he was the Attorney-General and Director of the Judicial Inspection Department.

Between 2008 and 2021, he served as the President of the Court of Cassation and the Supreme Judicial Council. In addition, he was appointed advisor at the office of the Deputy Amir in 2018.

Between 17 June 2021 and 8 January 2024, al-Ameri had served as Minister of Justice.
