= Mohammed al-Ajami =

Qatari poet

- محمد العجمي
- Born: December 24, 1975; Qatar
- Occupation: Poet
- Known for: Political poetry, imprisonment case

Mohammed al-Ajami (also known as "Mohammed Ibn al-Dheeb"; Arabic: محمد بن الذيب العجمي; born in Qatar), is a Qatari poet who was imprisoned between 2011 and 2016 on state security charges. Prior to his arrest, he was a literature student at Cairo University. On 29 November 2012, he was sentenced to life imprisonment, a sentence commuted in March 2016 through royal pardon.

== Arrest and detention ==
Al-Ajami was summoned to meet with state security officials on 16 November 2011 in Doha, and was arrested when he arrived for the meeting. He was charged with insulting Emir Hamad bin Khalifa Al Thani and "inciting to overthrow the ruling system". Under Qatari law, the latter charge is punishable by death. As of 29 October 2012, al-Ajami's trial had been postponed five times; he also spent five months in solitary confinement.

On 29 November 2012, al-Ajami's lawyer, Najeeb Al Nuaimi, reported that al-Ajami had been sentenced to life imprisonment in a secret trial. The court heard testimony from three poetry experts employed by the government ministries of education and culture, who stated that al-Ajami's poem had insulted the emir and his son. While confessing authorship of the poem, al-Ajami stated that he had not intended for it to be insulting, calling the emir "a good man". The Associated Press described al-Ajami's sentence as "the latest blow from a widening clampdown on perceived dissent across the Gulf Arab states." Al-Nuaimi also accused authorities of procedural irregularities including evidence tampering, allegations which Attorney General Ali bin Fetais al-Marri denied.

The precise basis for the charges was not publicly known. Amnesty International reported in October 2012 that the charges appeared to be related to a 2010 poem in which al-Ajami criticized the emir. Other activists believed the charges to stem from his poem "Tunisian Jasmine", which stated "we are all Tunisia in the face of the repressive", referring to the Tunisian revolution which began the region-wide Arab Spring. BBC News reported that al-Ajami had read a poem criticizing Arab rulers before a private audience in his home, which an audience member then posted online.

The International Committee for the Liberation of the Qatari Poet Mohammed Ibn al-Dheeb al-Ajami, linked to the United Nations Human Rights Council in Geneva, was established on October 22, 2013. The committee was co-founded by Arab and foreign human rights, artistic and creative figures, and chaired by Riadh Sidaoui.

In February 2013, it was reported that al-Ajami's life sentence had been reduced to fifteen years. Defense attorneys seeking his immediate release said they were planning an appeal to Qatar's supreme court.

== Release from prison ==
Al-Ajami was released from prison in March 2016 after a royal pardon commuted his sentence.

== International response ==
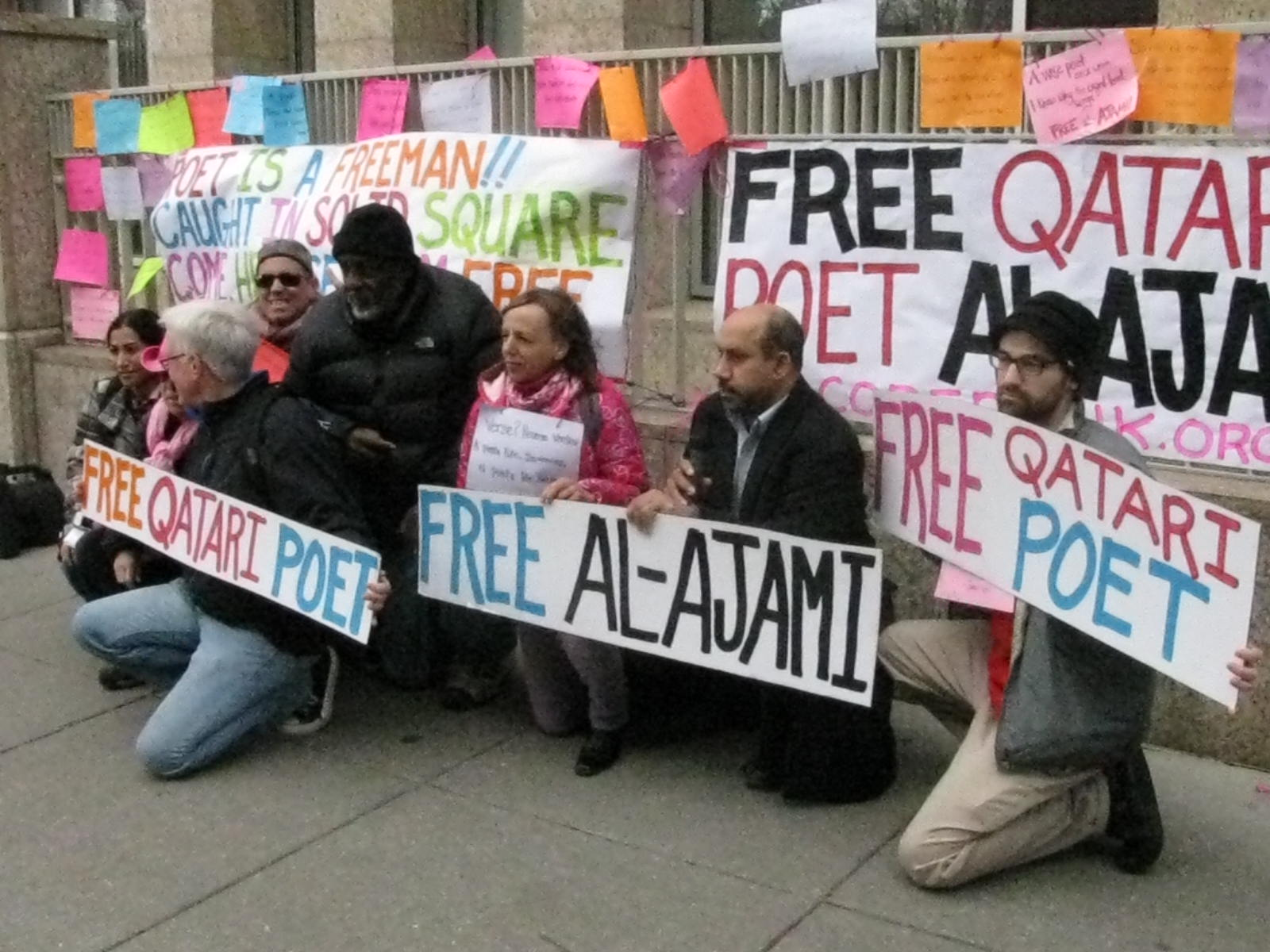
A demonstration outside the Qatari embassy in Washington, D.C.

Amnesty International called on the Qatari government to release al-Ajami if he were being held for the content of his poems, stating that in that case he would be a prisoner of conscience. Human Rights Watch stated that there was no evidence "that he has gone beyond the legitimate exercise of his right to free expression", and called the trial an example of Qatar's "double standard on freedom of expression". EveryOne Group, 100 Thousand Poets for Change, Split This Rock, PEN American Center, PEN Center Germany, Code Pink, and Rootsaction.org were engaged in civil actions to ask the authorities of Qatar to review the judgment and release Mohammed al-Ajami.

== See also ==
- Human rights in Qatar
