= Khalifa bin Hamad Al Thani (born 1991) =

Qatari sheikh and minister of the Interior since 2023

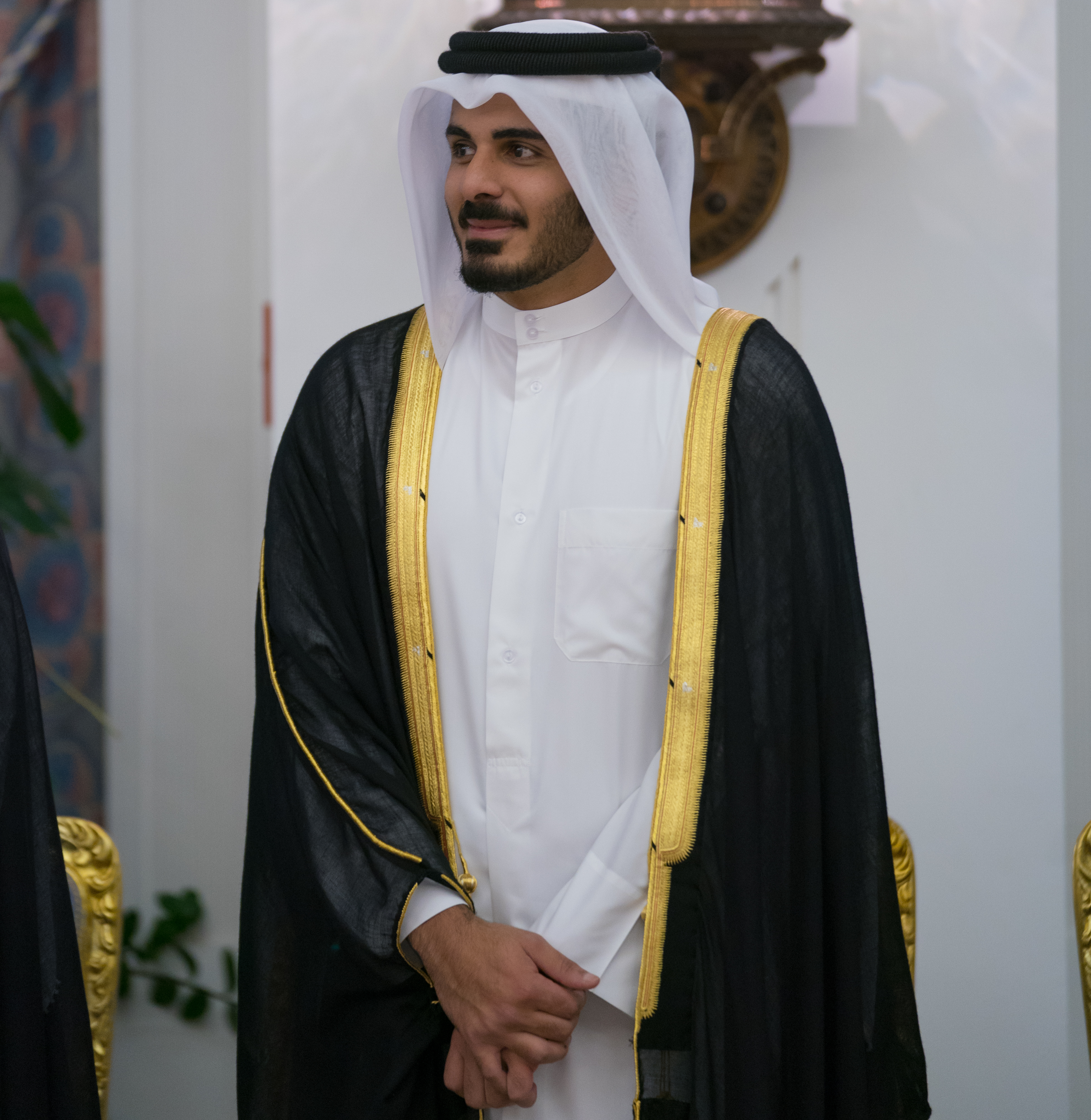
- Al Thani in 2024
- Born: 11 November 1991 (age 34)
- House: Thani
- Father: Hamad bin Khalifa Al Thani
- Mother: Moza bint Nasser Al-Missned

Khalifa bin Hamad bin Khalifa Al Thani (Arabic: الشيخ خليفة بن حمد بن خليفة آل ثاني; born 11 November 1991), known as K.H.K, is a member of the Qatari royal family, and a full-brother of the current Emir of Qatar, Tamim bin Hamad Al Thani. Since March 2023, he has been the Minister of Interior of Qatar.

== Education ==
In 2011, Al Thani began studying at Los Angeles Mission College, a community college. He lived in the Beverly Wilshire Hotel. According to the Los Angeles Times, his handlers sought to get him accepted into UCLA by suggesting that the school would receive a substantial donation. They next sought to get him accepted into the University of Southern California (USC). Four months after a meeting between Al Thani's mother, Moza bint Nasser, and USC President C. L. Max Nikias, Al Thani began studying at USC as a transfer student.

Al Thani received a bachelor's and master's degree from USC. In July 2020, the Los Angeles Times published an investigative report showing that he was allowed to skip classes as an undergraduate student for dubious "security reasons", and that he obtained his master's during a period in which he never set foot on campus. During his master's, Al Thani got a "special dispensation" to study remotely, which USC has never offered to any other student before or after. At the same time that he was enrolled in the master's, social media posts showed him attending a handful of military exercises as well as vacationing in France, the UK, Monaco and Algeria, where he went hunting with falcons. An adjunct professor said that Al Thani's handlers delivered a final paper in a bag that also contained a Rolex watch, which the adjunct returned.

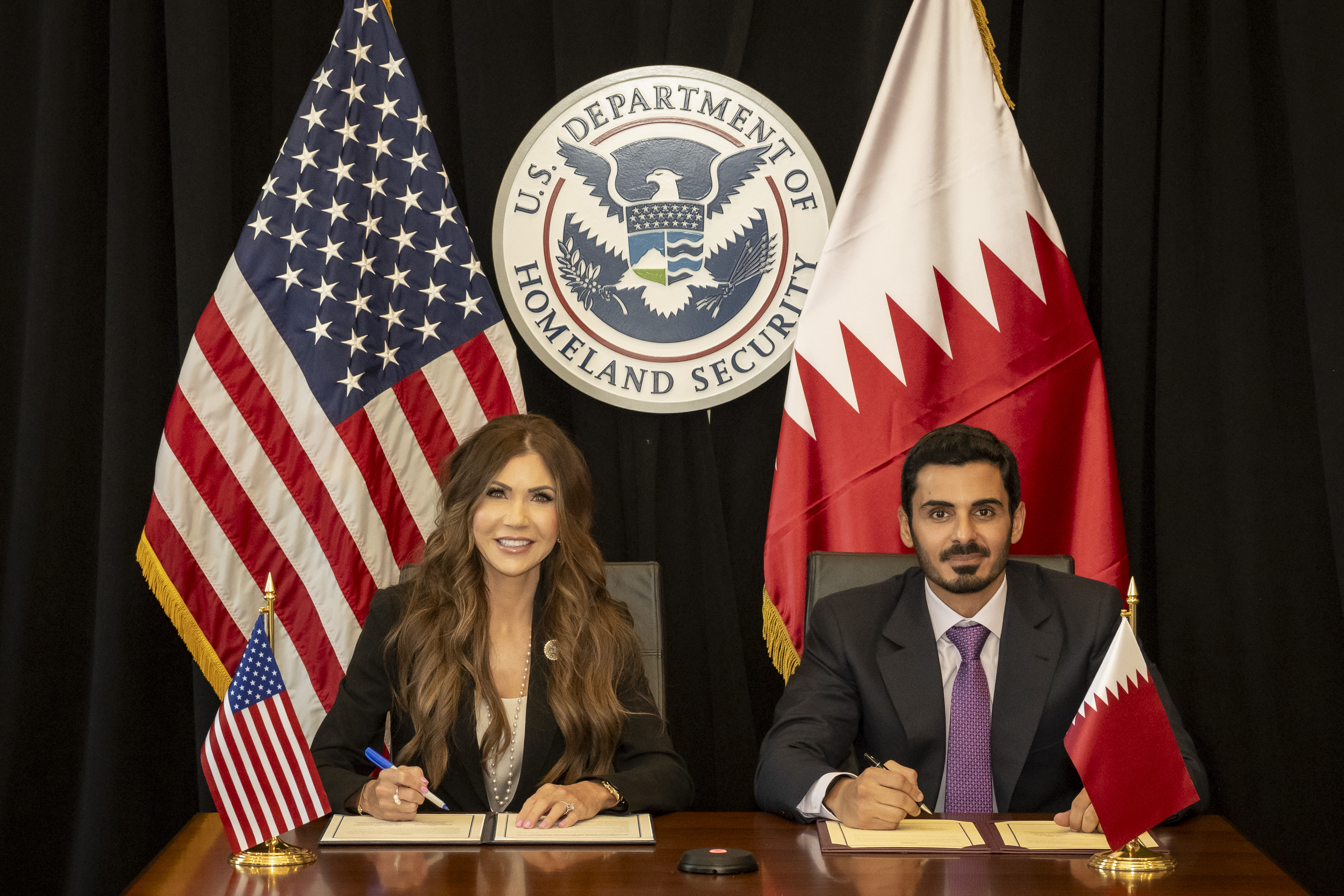
Khalifa Bin Hamad with Kristi Noem in 9 July 2025.

== Official state positions ==
Al Thani is an officer in the Qatari internal security service. He was also Commander of Security Operations for the 2022 FIFA World Cup.

In March 2023, he was appointed Minister of Interior.

== Personal life ==
Al Thani is a car collector. He frequently has his cars shipped to cities around the world for vacation.

In December 2019, Al Thani was elected as the new president of Al-Duhail SC.

In 2020, there was an outstanding warrant for Al Thani's arrest in California for failure to appear in court following a traffic violation. California Highway Patrol officers detained Al Thani and cited him for speeding (130 mph (210 km/h)). In a criminal complaint, L.A. prosecutors alleged he was driving recklessly.
