= Ibrahim bin Ali bin Issa al-Hassan al-Mohannadi =

Qatari politician

Minister of Justice and Minister of State for Cabinet Affairs
- Incumbent
- Assumed office 8 January 2024
- Monarch: Tamim bin Hamad Al Thani
- Prime Minister: Mohammed bin Abdulrahman Al Thani
- Preceded by: Masoud bin Mohammed al-Ameri

Personal details
- Education: Durham University (LL.B.); University of Swansea (LL.M.)

Ibrahim bin Ali bin Issa al-Hassan al-Mohannadi is the Qatari Minister of Justice and Minister of State for Cabinet Affairs. He was appointed as minister on 8 January 2024.

== Education ==
Al-Mohannadi holds a Bachelor of Laws from Durham University in England and a Master of Laws from the University of Swansea in Wales.

== Career ==
From 2004 until 2005, al-Mohannadi served as Second Lieutenant in the Armed Forces of Qatar.

Between 2013 and 2024, he was Director of Legal Affairs at the Amiri Diwan.

Since 8 January 2024, al-Mohannadi has been the Minister of Justice and Minister of State for Cabinet Affairs.
