= Mohammed bin Abdullah bin Mohammed Al Thani =

Qatari politician

Minister of Transport
- Incumbent
- Assumed office 12 November 2024
- Monarch: Tamim bin Hamad Al Thani
- Prime Minister: Mohammed bin Abdulrahman Al Thani
- Preceded by: Jassim Saif Al Sulaiti

Personal details
- Education: Cardiff University (M)

Mohammed bin Abdullah bin Mohammed Al Thani is the Qatari Minister of Transport. He was appointed as minister on 12 November 2024.

== Education ==
Al Thani holds a Bachelor in Economics and Administrative Science from Qatar University and a Master in Accounting and Finance from Cardiff University.

== Career ==
Al Thani served in the Qatar Armed Forces.

In 2020, Al Thani was appointed CEO of Ooredoo Qatar. Additionally, he was CEO of Ooredoo Kuwait and Deputy CEO of Ooredoo Group, and Chairman of the Board of Ooreedo in Oman, Kuwait, Myanmar and Algeria.

Al Thani served as Vice Chairman of the Board of Directors of Asiacell Iraq and President Commissioner of Indosat Ooredoo.

Since 2024, Al Thani has served as Minister of Transport.
