= United Development Company =

Qatari real estate company

- Native name: المتحدة للتنمية
- Company type: Public
- Traded as: United Development (UDCD)
- Industry: Investment
- Founded: 1999
- Headquarters: Doha, Qatar
- Key people: Ahmed Al Hammadi (Chairman)
- Subsidiaries: Hospitality Development Company; Qatar District Cooling Company; Ronautica Middle East; Madina Inova; The Pearl Owners Corporation
- Website: www.udcqatar.com

United Development Company Q.P.S.C. (UDC) is a Qatari public shareholding company. It is Qatar's leading construction firm, engaged in several industry sectors and operating subsidiaries in the segments of real estate development & construction, hydrocarbon & energy, hospitality & leisure, and infrastructure & utilities.

== History ==
Founded in 1999 as an urban development and investment company, in June 2003, it became listed in the Qatar Stock Exchange under the symbol: QE: UDCD.QA.

One of the companies main activities is the development of 985 acres of land in a man-made island, known as The Pearl Island, into urban districts with supporting infrastructure including luxury housing & apartments, retail centers, educational & healthcare institutions, hotels, and marinas.

In 2017, United Development Company reported revenues of $549 million, and a net profit of $166 million.

In August 2018, the Qatari stock exchange had risen by 17 percent, which had recouped the exchange's losses due to the embargo. In the same year, UDC witnessed an increase in residential and retail leasing business at their main real estate development, The Pearl Island. This was due to the fact that the man-made island, located 350 meters offshore of Doha's West Bay District, had seen an increase in the number of rented residential properties & leased retails areas during the first half of 2018.

The company has signed contracts for the development of Gewan Island, which is claimed to be a $686 million project located next to The Pearl Island.

== Projects ==
The Pearl Island, developed by United Development Company, is "an artificial island spanning nearly four square kilometers" and was planned by architecture and design firm Callison. It is a mixed-used development that spans 4.12 million sqm of reclaimed land with 32 km of coastline, and an estimated construction cost of $14 billion.

As of 2015, the island was reportedly home to more than 56 nationalities making up the more than 19,000 residents. This number reportedly grew to 27,000 residents in 2017. Commercially, and as of September 2017, the island recorded 115,000 msq. of leased retail space.

In April 2018, at an international real estate investment event, UDC signed contracts for the development of a new project called Gewan Island. The Letter of Intent (LOI) was signed by UDC and Qatar National Bank for financing the development of the project. Gewan Island, which is next to The Pearl Island has an approximate area of 400,000 sqm with an expected built up area of 388,000 sqm.

== Subsidiaries & joint ventures ==
The following are United Development Company's major subsidiaries:

- Hospitality Development Company (HDC) - founded in 2007 and focused in the development and operation of hospitality establishments such as restaurants and food outlets.
- Madina Innova O.M.C. - founded in 2010 for facilities management for residents of The Pearl Island.
- Ronautica Middle East (RME) - incorporated in 2007, and focusing on marina management and nautical services.

The below are UDC's more prominent joint-ventures:

- Qatar District Cooling Company (Qatar Cool) - established in 2003 to provide district cooling for The Pearl Island and Qatar's West Bay District with their latest plant becoming the first LEED-certified cooling plant in Qatar.
- United Readymix W.L.L. - a joint venture for the production of ready-mix concrete, formed between UDC, BESIX and Six Construct of Belgium and other Qatari investors.
