= Ministry of Interior (Qatar) =

Government ministry of Qatar

Ministry of Interior Qatar
- وزارة الداخلية - دولة قطر; Wizārat al-Dākhiliyya – Dawlat Qaṭar

Agency overview
- Formed: 1970; 56 years ago
- Jurisdiction: Qatar
- Headquarters: Wadi Al Sail, Doha
- Ministers responsible: Khalifa bin Hamad bin Khalifa Al Thani, Minister of Interior; Abdulaziz bin Faisal bin Mohammed Al-Thani, Minister of State for Interior Affairs; Abdullah bin Khalaf bin Hattab Al Kaabi, Undersecretary of the Ministry of Interior
- Agency executive: Mohammed Jassim Al Sulaiti, Director of Public Security
- Child agencies: Office of the Minister of Interior; General Directorate of Public Security; General Directorate of Traffic; General Directorate of Passports; General Directorate of Criminal Investigation; Drug Enforcement Department; General Directorate of Civil Defence; General Directorate of Coasts and Borders Security; General Directorate of Logistics and Supply; General Directorate of Information Systems
- Website: https://portal.moi.gov.qa/

The Ministry of Interior of Qatar was established in 1970, and is responsible for providing security and safety for citizens and protecting the borders and coasts of the country. In March 2023, Khalifa bin Hamad bin Khalifa Al Thani was appointed as minister.
