= Ministry of Environment and Climate Change (Qatar) =

Government ministry of Qatar

The Ministry of Environment and Climate Change (MECC) is a Qatari government ministry responsible for environmental protection, climate change policy, environmental regulation and biodiversity conservation. Following the separation of environmental responsibilities from the former Ministry of Municipality and Environment in a government reorganisation, the MECC was established on 19 October 2021.

The ministry's first minister was Faleh bin Nasser bin Ahmed bin Ali Al Thani, who served from October 2021 until January 2024. On 8 January 2024, he was succeeded by Abdulla bin Abdulaziz bin Turki al-Subaie, who was appointed in January 2024.

== History ==
The Ministry of Environment and Climate Change was established on 19 October 2021 as part of a cabinet reshuffle announced by Emir Tamim bin Hamad Al Thani. The responsibilities of the former Ministry of Municipality and Environment were divided between the newly established Ministry of Environment and Climate Change and the Ministry of Municipality.

Faleh bin Nasser bin Ahmed bin Ali Al Thani was appointed as the first Minister of Environment and Climate Change. The creation of the ministry took place shortly before the 2021 United Nations Climate Change Conference in Glasgow.

Following a further cabinet reshuffle on 8 January 2024, Abdulla bin Abdulaziz bin Turki al-Subaie succeeded Faleh bin Nasser Al Thani as Minister of Environment and Climate Change.

== Responsibilities ==
Under Article 8 of Emirate Resolution No. 57 of 2021, the ministry is responsible for developing and implementing environmental protection policies, reducing greenhouse gas emissions, conducting environmental studies and increasing public awareness. It protects terrestrial and marine wildlife and their habitats, manages nature reserves, and oversees environmental licensing, compliance monitoring, and inspections of industrial activities. It is also responsible for regulating chemical and radioactive materials, managing radioactive waste, overseeing the peaceful use of nuclear energy and promoting the sustainable use of treated wastewater and recycled solid waste. In collaboration with government institutions and organisations in sectors such as energy and agriculture, the ministry coordinates and supervises the implementation of national environmental and climate change strategies.

In October 2025, the ministry announced the publication of Qatar's Second National Communication to the United Nations Framework Convention on Climate Change (UNFCCC). This report details the country's greenhouse gas emissions, climate change mitigation and adaptation measures, and sustainable development initiatives. The report was prepared in collaboration with government institutions, academic organisations and national research centres.

== Policies and strategies ==
=== National Environment and Climate Change Strategy (2021) ===
On 28 October 2021, Qatar launched its National Environment and Climate Change Strategy. The strategy set out five environmental priorities: reducing greenhouse gas emissions and air pollution, restoring biodiversity, establishing sustainable water management, improving waste management, developing a circular economy, and enhancing land use productivity. The strategy is part of the environmental policy framework set out in the Qatar National Vision 2030 initiative. It outlines national goals for reducing emissions, conserving biodiversity and sustainably using natural resources.

An academic analysis from 2022 found that the Ministry of Environment and Climate Change plays a pivotal role in overseeing national environmental and climate change strategies, with implementation responsibilities distributed among government and non-governmental organisations. The analysis also examined coordination challenges and the availability of environmental data, as well as the monitoring of national environmental policy objectives.

=== Ministry of Environment and Climate Change Strategy (2024-2030) ===
On 17 November 2024, the ministry launched its strategy for the period from 2024 to 2030, which is part of Qatar's Third National Development Strategy. The strategy identifies environmental sustainability and climate change, innovation and digital transformation, environmental governance, and sustainable institutional development. It provides a framework for the ministry's activities relating to environmental protection, climate change, and institutional development. The strategy sets out national environmental targets for 2030, including reducing greenhouse gas emissions by 25%, restoring 30% of degraded natural habitats, protecting 30% of land and coastal areas, and conserving 17 endangered and endemic species. To support its implementation, the ministry has announced over 30 initiatives and 100 associated projects.
