= Ministry of Education and Higher Education (Qatar) =

Government ministry of Qatar

The Ministry of Education and Higher Education is one of the ministries of Qatar that provides free education from kindergarten to secondary school for all Qatari citizens. Education is also considered compulsory according to the law. The current minister is Lolwah bint Rashid bin Mohammed Al Khater, who was appointed in November 2024.

== About the Ministry ==
In 2002, a decree was issued to establish the Supreme Education Council in Qatar as the supreme authority responsible for drawing up the educational policy of Qatar, for the education development plan and supervising its implementation, followed by the law establishing independent schools in 2006. All public schools were converted into independent schools in 2010. The idea of independent schools is based on the independence of school management in terms of curricula, attracting teachers, and spending with the supervision of the Supreme Education Council. The experience of independent schools continued until Law No. 9 of 2017 was issued regarding the organization of schools, after which the management of schools returned to the Ministry of Education and Higher Education in full after the abolition of the independent school experience and the transformation of the Supreme Education Council into a ministry with a new structure. The educational system in Qatar is now based on three stages: primary (6 years), preparatory (3 years) and secondary (three years). The law also authorized the establishment of kindergartens from the age of four years.

== Responsibilities ==
The ministry's responsibilities include:

- Raising the level of education, ensuring it for every citizen, and developing it to ensure that the state's needs for resources and distinguished human competencies in various fields are met.
- Determining the stages of education, preparing curricula and examination systems.
- Licensing, supervising and controlling nurseries.
- Licensing and supervising schools and higher education institutions, including allocating financial support and technical and administrative guidance to them.
- Dispatching scientific missions and supervising and taking care of scholarship students.
- Supporting students with special needs and gifted students.
- Supervising government education institutes.
- Issuing licenses for educational services centers and following them up.
- Providing training and professional development for teachers and education personnel.
