= Ministry of Municipality (Qatar) =

Government ministry of Qatar

The Ministry of Municipality is a Qatari government ministry responsible for municipal administration, urban planning, public sanitation, agricultural development, fisheries, and food security. It also oversees land management, public parks, and municipal services throughout the country. Following the establishment of a dedicated environmental ministry in October 2021, the ministry has operated under its current name. The current minister is Abdullah bin Hamad bin Abdullah al-Attiya, who was appointed on 8 January 2024.

== History ==
The Ministry of Municipal Affairs was established in 1972 as part of the development of Qatar's municipal administration. Responsibility for environmental protection was given to the Ministry of Municipal Affairs and Agriculture in 1990, resulting in the establishment of an Environmental Protection Department within the ministry. In 1994, the Standing Committee for Environmental Protection came under the remit of the Ministry of Municipal Affairs and Agriculture, with the department acting as its technical secretariat. In 2004, Law No. 1 was passed to establish the Public Works Authority (Ashghal), a government body responsible for public infrastructure projects. That same year, Law No. 15 was passed, transferring urban planning functions from the Ministry to the newly established General Authority of Urban Planning and Development. In 2009, the Ministry of Municipal Affairs and Agriculture was reorganised and became the Ministry of Municipality and Urban Planning. The new ministry's organisational structure was set out in Emiri Decision No. 36 of 2009. In January 2016, as part of a wider government restructuring, the Ministry of Municipality and Urban Planning merged with the Ministry of Environment to form the Ministry of Municipality and Environment.

On 19 October 2021, the Ministry of Municipality and Environment was divided into two separate ministries. The Ministry of Municipality and the Ministry of Environment and Climate Change. The former retained responsibility for municipal administration, urban planning, agriculture, fisheries, and food security, while the latter took over environmental regulation and climate-related responsibilities.

On 24 October 2022, Emiri issued Decision No. 40 of 2022. This established a revised organisational structure for the Ministry of Municipality and defined the responsibilities of its administrative units.

On 13 June 2024, the Ministry launched its 2024–2030 strategy, which focuses on digital transformation, food security, and urban development. Planned initiatives include the expansion of digital municipal services, improvements to waste management, an increase in green spaces and enhancements to geographic information systems.

== Responsibilities ==
The Ministry of Municipality is responsible for municipal administration and urban planning in Qatar. Its responsibilities include land management, surveying and issuing building permits and completion certificates. The ministry also provides administrative services relating to land allocation and planning procedures.

It is responsible for public sanitation and waste management, including waste collection, recycling and waste separation programmes. The ministry is also responsible for developing and maintaining public parks, gardens, and green spaces, as well as urban landscaping projects.

With regard to agriculture and food security, the ministry supports local farmers by providing agricultural services and technical assistance, promoting domestic food production, and participating in initiatives to reduce food waste. The Fish Affairs Department implements programmes to support fisheries and maintain fish stocks in Qatari waters.

The ministry considers recommendations from the Central Municipal Council regarding municipal services and local development. Other responsibilities include overseeing the accreditation of engineering consultancy offices and coordinating cemetery and burial services.
