= Ministry of Social Development and Family (Qatar) =

Government ministry of Qatar

- وزارة التنمية الاجتماعية والأسرة

Agency overview
- Formed: 2021
- Jurisdiction: Qatar
- Headquarters: Doha
- Agency executive: Buthaina bint Ali al-Jabr al-Nuaimi, Minister of Social Development and Family
- Website: https://msdf.gov.qa/en

Ministry of Social Development and Family was created in 2021, after it was separated from the Ministry of Labor. The current minister is Buthaina bint Ali al-Jabr al-Nuaimi.

== Ministry tasks ==
- Propose and implement national strategies, plans and policies related to the care of the family and its members.
- Raising community awareness for the importance of protecting the family and family cohesion.
- Supervising the organization of the charitable works sector.
- Providing social security services to eligible beneficiaries.
- Registration and publication of private associations and institutions and control over them.
- Propose and implement policies related to housing and follow up their implementation.
- Collecting and analyzing data and statistics related to the family and benefiting from them in the relevant programs, plans and policies, in coordination with the concerned governmental and private agencies.
- Preparing and implementing programs and related services for all categories of beneficiaries of social security services.
