= Ministry of Transport (Qatar) =

Government ministry of Qatar

The Ministry of Transport of Qatar organizes land and sea transport work, develops and improves transport service. In 2016, the Ministry was merged with the Ministry of Communications, and later in 2021, the Ministry of Transport was separated from the Ministry of Communications. The current minister is Mohammed bin Abdullah bin Mohammed Al Thani.

== Ministry tasks ==
The Ministry of Transport is responsible for the following matters:

1. Supervising land, sea and air transportation.
2. Working on developing and improving transportation services, studying their projects, and following up on their implementation, in order to expand the scope of the economic movement and serve the requirements of national development.
3. Monitoring compliance with technical performance standards for entities and companies licensed to practice transportation activities.
4. Monitoring traffic movements and proposing traffic safety initiatives, in coordination with the competent authorities.
5. Supervising marine and air activities, issuing licenses and ensuring compliance with applicable laws, regulations and systems.
6. Supervising meteorological activities.

== Ministry achievements ==
The Ministry of Transport is responsible for the development and modernization of the infrastructure in order to support the industrial and service sectors. At the level of road transport, the sector continues its efforts to develop improved infrastructure in line with the objectives of the Qatar National Vision 2030. The ministry has allocated 95% of the investments in infrastructure projects to organize road transport with the aim of increasing the length of highways, building bridges and tunnels, enhancing traffic safety.

In the maritime transport sector, the ministry seeks to modernize and develop a system in order to meet the increasing demands at the local and regional levels and keep pace with the international developments in this field. Also, one of the priorities of this sector is to ensure the quality of services and means of maritime transport, the development of ports in the country and the preservation of infrastructure.

At the level of air transport regulation, the ministry achieved success with the approval of the Council of the International Civil Aviation Organization (ICAO) to establish the Doha Aviation Information Region and the Doha Search and Rescue Region based on a proposal submitted by Qatar, which includes the airspace under its sovereignty.

In the public transport sector the ministry has started with the transformation strategy for electric vehicles. During the implementation of the strategy, more than 600 electric charge equipment will be installed in warehouses and bus stations, in addition to the sites of Doha Metro stations and other selected stops to support electric buses used in public transport operations.
