= Ministry of Foreign Affairs (Qatar) =

Government ministry of Qatar

Coordinates: 25.327483°N 51.527681°E

Qatar Ministry of Foreign Affairs
- وزارة الخارجية
- Logo of the Ministry of Foreign Affairs for the State of Qatar

Agency overview
- Formed: 1971
- Jurisdiction: Government of Qatar
- Headquarters: Doha
- Agency executive: Mohammed bin Abdulrahman bin Jassim Al Thani, Minister of Foreign Affairs
- Website: mofa.gov.qa

The Ministry of Foreign Affairs (Arabic: وزارة الخارجية) is a cabinet ministry of the Qatari government responsible for managing the country's foreign relations, and for proposing its foreign policy to the emir and following up on its implementation upon his approval. It is currently led by Minister of Foreign Affairs Mohammed bin Abdulrahman bin Jassim Al Thani, who also serves as the nation's Prime Minister.

== History ==
Qatar was a part of the Ottoman Empire until the end of World War I, at which point it became a British protectorate. After achieving full independence from the United Kingdom in 1971, the Qatari government established an independent foreign ministry.

== List of ministers ==
- 1971–1972: Sheikh Khalifa bin Hamad Al Thani
- 1972–1985: Sheikh Suhaim bin Hamad Al Thani
- 1985–1989: Sheikh Ahmed bin Saif Al Thani
- 1989–1990: Abdullah bin Khalifa al-Attiyah
- 1990–1992: Mubarak Ali al-Khater
- 1992–2013: Sheikh Hamad bin Jassim bin Jaber Al Thani
- 2013–2016: Khalid bin Mohammad Al Attiyah
- 2016–present: Sheikh Mohammed bin Abdulrahman Al Thani

== Multilateral relations ==
Sheikh Hamad bin Khalifa Al Thani, the emir of Qatar from 1995 to 2013, helped establish Qatar's reputation as an influential player in Middle East politics. Qatar has also cultivated close relationships with Western powers, particularly the United States and the United Kingdom. Qatar has a population of around 1.8 million people, however only 280,000 of these are citizens. Qatar was a member of OPEC from 1961 until it withdrew on 1 January 2019 to focus on developing its natural gas industry.

== Foreign aid ==
Qatar’s international aid program has expanded dramatically since the beginning of 2010, and focuses heavily on the Arab world, most notably in the humanitarian crises in Syria and Gaza.

According to the UN OCHA’s Financial Tracking Service, Qatar's international aid increased from less than $10 million annually in the pre-Arab Spring period to the hundreds of millions following the event.

Qatari leadership has since pledged publicly to reduce suffering of victims and to achieve and support global partnerships for the achievement of foreign countries’ Millennium Development Goals. The state is engaged in investments in a wide range of humanitarian and developmental sectors.

For example:

=== Turkey and Syria ===
Qatar government provided relief flights to Turkey to transport search and rescue teams as well as vehicles, a field hospital, tents, and other supplies. Qatar also distributed 27,000 hot meals in the Turkish city and also donated mobile homes from FIFA 2022 World Cup, further has pledged to send 10,000 mobile housing units to earthquake zones in Turkey and Syria.

=== Yemen ===
Qatar has donated $500 million in humanitarian aid to two Yemeni provinces to help people displaced by the Houthi rebellion.

Qatar Red Crescent Society (QRCS) in Yemen constructed a dialysis center in Lahij Governorate costing $298,145.The center is the only dialysis hospital in the governorate, providing services and consultations for patients with kidney failure, accommodating 500 patients per month.

=== Libya ===
Qatar sent 58 tonnes of humanitarian and relief assistance to help the flood-stricken Libyan city of Derna, bringing the total Qatari aid to those affected to 267 tonnes. Qatar Charity has launched the ‘Libya Appeal’ campaign to help Libyans recover from devastating floods that have killed thousands and forced many into displacements. The campaign aims to provide support to affected families and meet their basic needs. Qatar has stepped in to support Libya since the floods struck earlier this month, with Sheikh Tamim expressing condolences and solidarity with the Libyan people.

=== Ukraine ===
According to Ukrainian Prime Minister Denys Shmyhal, Qatar provided $100 million in humanitarian aid to Ukraine for health, education, and demining. The funds will be used for reconstruction and other social projects.

=== Morocco ===
Qatar Charity also launched an urgent relief campaign in Morocco to help earthquake victims. The aid included drinking water, blankets, and hot meals. The emergency and relief department director, Khaled Al Yafei, urged philanthropists in Qatar to provide aid to alleviate trauma and support families of the victims. The earthquake in Morocco killed 1,037 people and 1,204 were injured.

=== Regional relations ===
In September 2014. QFFD contributed in enhancing stability for Syrian refugees. Qatar Charity facilitated access to quality education through the rehabilitation of 6 Formal schools in Turkey, Gaziantep, Urfa, Kilis, targeting a total number of 13,540 beneficiaries and 12,860 girls and boys.

On 27 March 2022, The United Nations Office of Counter-Terrorism (UNOCT) and Qatar on their fourth high-level strategic discussion, discussed strategic priorities and worked together to ensure that the UN effectively supports member states in their efforts to combat terrorism. Out of a total of 35 other contributors, the state of Qatar is the second greatest contributor to the UN trust fund for counter-terrorism.

Qatar voiced support for the Turkish invasion of northern Syria aimed at ousting U.S.-backed Syrian Kurds from the enclave of Afrin. Spokeswoman of Ministry of Foreign Affairs, Lulwah Rashif Al-Khater said that: "The launching of the Turkish military operation last Saturday was motivated by legitimate concerns related to its national security and the security of its borders, in addition to protecting Syria's territorial integrity from the danger of secession. Turkey, a NATO member, has always been a stabilizing factor in the region."

In January 2021 the United States, represented by the United States Department of Defense, awarded then-Deputy Prime Minister and Minister of Foreign Affairs of Qatar Sheikh Mohammed bin Abdulrahman bin Jassim Al Thani and Qatar's ambassador in Washington Meshal bin Hamad al-Thani with the Department of Defense Medal for Distinguished Public Service, one of the highest honors bestowed by the US to officials. Then-US National Security Adviser Robert C. O'Brien gave the medal to the Ambassador, who received it on behalf of both himself and Sheikh Mohammed.

This award was in recognition of his exemplary diplomatic efforts to strengthen relations between the State of Qatar and the United States, to support and advance peace efforts in Afghanistan (including the signing of the US–Taliban peace deal on 29 February 2020, as well as the launch of the Afghan peace process on 12 September 2020), to promote stability and prosperity in the Middle East North Africa region, and to resolve the Gulf Crisis through diplomacy.

== Bilateral relations ==
List of European countries which Qatar maintains diplomatic relations with:

=== Cyprus–Qatar relations ===
Cyprus–Qatar relations refer to the bilateral relations between Cyprus and Qatar. Qatar is represented in Cyprus through its embassy in Nicosia, Cyprus. Cyprus is represented in Qatar through its embassy in Doha, Qatar.

=== France–Qatar relations ===
France–Qatar relations are the bilateral relations between France and the Qatar. The first embassy to be established was the Qatari embassy in France in 1972, and the first bilateral agreement was signed in 1974. Qatar has marked various concurrences with France, covering all areas such as cultural, political, economical, academic, scientific and military agreements. The nations are tied in a key discourse protocol, where conversation over various issues of significance to the two capitals are occurring consistently.

=== Germany–Qatar relations ===
Qatar has had an embassy in Berlin since 2005, and Germany has an embassy in Doha. Bilateral ties were formed in 1973. In regards to economic relations, Qatar has made large-scale investments in some of Germany's most prominent companies, including Volkswagen, Siemens and Deutsche Bank. On 6 June 2017, German FM Sigmar Gabriel condemned the Saudi-led boycott of Qatar. In July, he called on the blockading countries to respect Qatar's rights as a sovereign nation, and applauded its prudence in responding to the blockade.

=== Qatar–Spain relations ===
The State of Qatar and the Kingdom of Spain formed diplomatic relations in December 1972. Qatar maintains an embassy in Madrid, while Spain has an embassy in Doha.

=== Qatar–Sweden Relations ===
Qatar-Sweden Relations are the bilateral relations between the Kingdom of Sweden and the State of Qatar. The relations are based on trade between the countries. Sweden has an embassy in West Bay in Doha, Qatar. The embassy opened on 14 May 2014. Qatar has an embassy in Stockholm, Sweden and the ambassador of Qatar to Sweden is Shka. Moza bint Nasser Ahmad Al-Thani. The economic relations between the countries are based on cooperation between Swedish and Qatari companies, mainly in the oil and the natural gas sector.

=== Qatar–United Kingdom relations ===
Qatar–United Kingdom relations are the bilateral relations between the State of Qatar and the United Kingdom of Great Britain and Northern Ireland, covering a wide range of issues and activities of mutual interest.

=== Qatar–United States relations ===
Qatar and the United States are strategic allies. Qatar has been designated a major non-NATO ally by the United States.

== Qatar as a mediator in conflict ==
Qatar's mediation strategy is rooted in its foreign policy, aiming to maintain good relations with a wide range of actors, including Western powers, regional neighbors, and various non-state actors. At the 77th UN General Assembly in 2022, Emir Sheikh Tamim bin Hamad Al-Thani stated that conflict mediation is a key element of Qatar's foreign policy, aiming to establish the country as a dependable international ally.

== See also ==
- Politics of Qatar
