= Jassim =

Jassim (جاسم) is an Arabic given name and surname. Notable people with the name include:

== Given name ==
- Jassem Alwan (1928–2018), Syrian colonel who attempted coup against Baathist government of Syria
- Jassim Al Saeedi, Bahraini salafist MP, member of parliament representing a constituency in Riffa
- Jassim bin Hamad bin Abdullah Al Thani (1921–1976), first Minister of Education in Qatar from 1958 to 1976
- Jassim bin Mohammed Al Thani (1826–1913), the founder of the modern Qatar
- Jassim bin Muhammed bin Jassim Al Thani (1914–1989), Qatari Minister Of Electricity and Water 1970–1989
- Jassim Mandi (born 1944), former football referee from the Asian state of Bahrain
- Jassim Mohammed Ghulam (born 1979), Iraqi football defender
- Jassim Mohammed Haji (born 1984), Iraqi football player of Kurdish ethnicity
- Jassim Swadi (born 1975), Iraqi football player
- Jassim bin Hamad bin Khalifa Al Thani (born 1978), Qatari royal

== Patronymic ==
- Abdullah bin Jassim Al Thani (1880–1957), ruler of Qatar from 1913 to 1949
- Abdulrahman bin Jassim Al Thani (1871–1930), Qatari politician
- Hamad bin Jabor bin Jassim Al Thani, Director General of the General Secretariat for Development Planning of Qatar
- Hamad bin Jassim bin Hamad Al Thani (born 1949), Qatari Minister for Economy and Trade 1977–1986
- Hamad bin Jassim bin Jaber Al Thani (born 1959), member of the royal family of Qatar, Prime Minister and Foreign Minister
- Khalifa bin Jassim Al Thani (born 1959), Chairman of Qatar Chamber of Commerce & Industry
- Muhammed bin Jassim bin Muhammed Al Thani (1881–1971), the mayor of Umm Salal Muhammed and Doha city
- Thani bin Jassim bin Muhammed Al Thani (1856–1943), the sheikh of Al Gharafa

== Surname ==
- Alaa Jassim (born 1985), Iraqi sprinter
- Amina Al Jassim, Saudi Arabian fashion designer of haute couture and jellabiyas
- Anwar Jassim (1947–2024), former Iraq national football coach
- Abbas Obeid Jassim (born 1973), Iraqi football (soccer) Midfielder
- Haidar Obeid Jassim (born 1979), Iraqi football (soccer) Defender
- Karrar Jassim (born 1987), Iraqi football (soccer) Midfielder
- Samira Jassim (born 1958), alleged to have worked with Sunni militants from the Ansar al-Sunnah group in Diyala province
- Taisir Al-Jassim (born 1984), Saudi Arabian footballer (soccer player)

== Places ==
- Jassim Bin Hamad Stadium, multi-purpose stadium in Doha, Qatar
- Jasim, city in southern Syria
