= Thani bin Hamad Al Thani =

Qatari royal

Thani bin Hamad bin Khalifa Al Thani
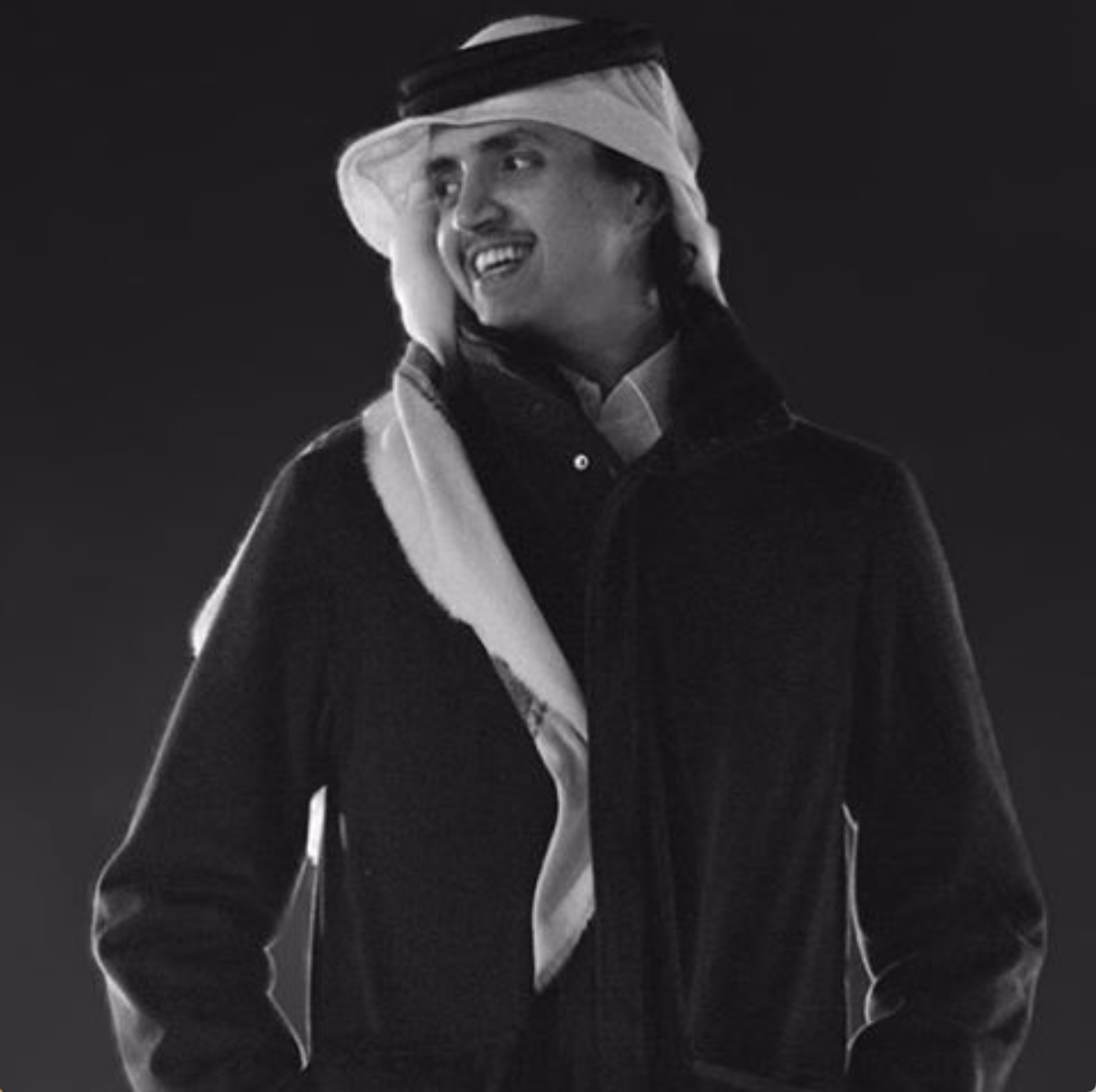
- Born: 16 January 1994 (age 32); Doha, Qatar
- Arabic: ثاني بن حمد بن خليفة آل ثاني
- House: Thani
- Father: Hamad bin Khalifa Al Thani
- Mother: Noora bint Khalid Al Thani
- Occupation: Board of Directors, Doha Film Institute, International Bank of Qatar

Thani bin Hamad bin Khalifa Al Thani (Arabic: ثاني بن حمد بن خليفة آل ثاني) is the brother of the Emir of Qatar Tamim bin Hamad Al Thani, and son of Emir Hamad bin Khalifa Al Thani. Al Thani sits on the board of directors of the Doha Film Institute and International Bank of Qatar.

== Career ==
Al Thani has met with numerous heads of state on behalf of the Qatari government, including Sudan's President Omar al-Bashir in Khartoum, in April 2017, and Turkey's President Recep Tayyip Erdoğan in Ankara, in June 2016. In September 2016, alongside Qatar's emir, Tamim bin Hamad Al Thani and foreign minister Mohammed bin Abdulrahman bin Jassim Al Thani, he attended the seventy-first session of the United Nations General Assembly. In September 2015, Al Thani, with his family, visited the Ruler of Dubai, Vice President and Prime Minister of the United Arab Emirates, Mohammed bin Rashid Al Maktoum, at Zabeel Palace, to express condolences on the death of his son Rashid bin Mohammed Al Maktoum. In April 2017, Al Thani visited Saudi Arabia's Governor of Mecca, Khalid bin Faisal Al Saud, to share his condolences on the death of his brother Saad bin Faisal.

Al Thani has attended several equestrian events on behalf of Qatar's royal family including the Ascot Gold Cup at Ascot Racecourse, and the Prix de l'Arc de Triomphe at Longchamp Racecourse. He has presented prestigious awards such as Qatar's Gold Sword and the Emir's Sword at a number of major horse races in Qatar.

In 2016, he was appointed as a member of the Board of Trustees at Doha Film Institute.

With his father Hamad bin Khalifa Al Thani, Al Thani inaugurated the Mall of Qatar, one of the Middle East's largest retail and leisure destinations, in April 2017.

Al Thani is popular on social media in the Middle East with 212,000 Instagram followers as of October 2022.

In October 2019, he opened the exhibition He Eats Alone curated by American artist Kaws at Doha Fire Station.

== Family ==
Other notable siblings of Al Thani include the Deputy Emir of Qatar and Chairman of the Qatar Investment Authority, Abdullah bin Hamad bin Khalifa Al Thani, Chairman of the 2022 FIFA World Cup, Mohammed bin Hamad bin Khalifa Al Thani, President of the Qatar Olympic Committee and owner of Al Shaqab racing, Joaan bin Hamad bin Khalifa Al Thani, Chairperson of Qatar Museums and Doha Film Institute, Al-Mayassa bint Hamad bin Khalifa Al Thani, Vice Chairperson and CEO of Qatar Foundation, Hind bint Hamad bin Khalifa Al Thani, Chairman of Aspire Academy and owner of Katara, Jasim bin Hamad bin Khalifa Al Thani, Minister of the Interior Sheikh Khalifa bin Hamad bin Khalifa Al Thani, and owner of Al-Anabi racing Khalid bin Hamad Al Thani.
