= Jabor bin Khalid Al-Thani =

Member of Qatar ruling family and former racer

Jabor Bin Khalid Al-Thani جبر بن خالد آل ثاني
- Born: 29 November 1994 (age 31); Doha, Qatar
- House: Thani
- Father: Khalid bin Hamad Al Thani
- Occupation: President of the Qatar Racing Club - QRC
- Years active: 2010–present

Jabor Bin Khalid Bin Hamad Al-Thani (Arabic: جبر بن خالد آل ثاني) is a senior member of the House of Thani. He is a former athlete and current president of the Qatar Racing Club - QRC.

== Education and career ==
Sheikh Jabor Bin Khalid Bin Hamad Al-Thani was educated at École spéciale militaire de Saint-Cyr, France. He also attended Oak Ridge Military Academy in the city of Oak Ridge, North Carolina.

In 2012, he was appointed president of the Qatar Racing Club. In 2020, he received a master's degree in Business Administration from HEC Paris in Qatar.
