= Irfan Nooruddin =

Professor of Foreign Service

Irfan Nooruddin is the Hamad bin Khalifa Al-Thani Professor of Indian Politics in the Asian Studies Program in the School of Foreign Service at Georgetown University.

Originally hailing from Mumbai in India, he moved to the US for studies and is a US Citizen.

== Previously ==
From 2015 to 2020, he served as the director of the Georgetown University India Initiative and the Atlantic Council South Asia Center Director.

He also was a fellow of the Woodrow Wilson International Center for Scholars in Washington, D.C.

== Books Authored ==
Elections in Hard Times: Building Stronger Democracies in the 21st Century (with T.E. Flores, Cambridge, 2016)

Coalition Politics and Economic Development: Credibility and the Strength of Weak Governments (Cambridge, 2011).

== Controversy ==
He called the image of Indian Prime Minister Narendra Modi a mirage on the world stage backed by statistics.
