= Qatar Chamber of Commerce and Industry =

Organization based in Qatar

Qatar Chamber of Commerce & Industry
- Abbreviation: QCCI
- Established: 1963
- Headquarters: Doha
- Region served: Qatar
- Chairman: Khalifa Bin Jassim Al-Thani
- Website: qatarchamber.com

The Qatar Chamber (Arabic: غرفة قطر) was founded in 1963 as the Qatar Chamber of Commerce and Industry (Arabic: غرفة تجارة وصناعة قطر) to promote and protect the interests of companies in the agricultural, industrial and commercial sectors of the economy of the country.

== Operations ==
It also provides administrative services, advice and arbitration. It is a member of the Indo-Arab Chamber of Commerce and Industries.

The body is chaired by Khalifa bin Jassim Al Thani.
