= Abdulkarim al-Thani =

Qatari royalty and alleged terrorist facilitator

Abdulkarim al-Thani is a member of the Qatari royal family and an alleged terrorist facilitator.

== Personal information ==
Little is known about Abdulkarim al-Thani. He is believed to be a pious member of the royal family of Qatar and holds no government position. According to The New York Times, al-Thani has given donations to militant causes in the past, but has denied knowing that his money went towards terrorist operations.

== Terrorism facilitating ==
In 2003, The New York Times reported that a member of Qatar's royal family operated the Qatar safe house that the al-Qaeda leader Abu Musab al-Zarqawi stayed in when traveling in and out of Afghanistan. The article identifies the Qatari royal family member as Abdulkarim al-Thani, adding that he also provided Qatari passports and over $1 million in funds to support the terrorist network while traveling through Qatar. Al-Zarqawi ended up founding the predecessor of ISIS, al-Qaeda in Iraq.

The mastermind behind the 9/11 attacks, Khalid Sheikh Mohammed, also reportedly sought shelter in Qatar with the assistance of al-Thani.
