= Fahad bin Hamad bin Khalifa Al Thani =

Second son of former emir of Qatar

Fahd bin Hamad bin Khalifa Al Thani فهد بن حمد بن خليفة آل ثاني
- Born: Doha
- House: Thani
- Father: Hamad bin Khalifa Al Thani
- Mother: Mariam bint Muhammad Al Thani

Fahd bin Hamad bin Khalifa Al Thani (Arabic: فهد بن حمد بن خليفة آل ثاني) is a member of the House of Thani.

== Early life ==
Sheikh Fahd is the second son and second oldest child of the former Emir of Qatar, Sheikh Hamad bin Khalifa Al Thani, and his first wife, Sheikha Mariam bint Muhammad Al Thani. He is the second oldest (half) brother of the current Emir Sheikh Tamim bin Hamad Al Thani.

== Career ==
Sheikh Fahd was educated at RMA Sandhurst and commissioned in the Qatar Armed Forces as a second lieutenant. He was later stripped of his military rank after showing signs of religious extremism. Hamad once told a Western ambassador that of his two eldest sons, "one [plays] too much; the other prays too much." Sheikh Fahd is understood to be the one that prayed too much.

He is involved with the Tablighi Jamaat movement.

== Personal life ==
Sheikh Fahad bin Hamad bin Khalifa Al Thani is married to Shaikha Rodha Al-Misnad. He has issue, one son and three daughters:

Sons:

- Shaikh Hamad bin Fahad Al-Hamad Al-Thani.

Daughters:

- Shaikha Mariam bint Fahad Al-Hamad Al-Thani.
- Shaikha Asma bint Fahad Al-Hamad Al-Thani.
- Shaikha Nayla bint Fahad Al-Hamad Al-Thani.
