= Hind bint Hamad bin Khalifa Al Thani =

Qatari sheikha

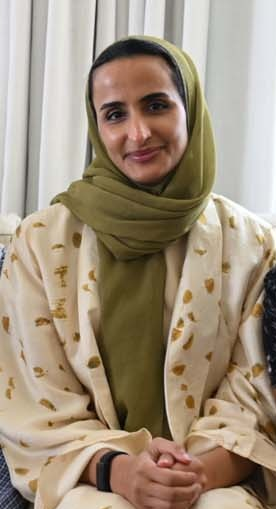
- Sheikha Hind in 2025
- Born: 15 August 1984 (age 41); Doha, Qatar
- Spouse: Faisal bin Thani Al Thani (m. 2010)
- Issue: 6
Names
- Hind bint Hamad bin Khalifa Al Thani
- House: Thani
- Father: Hamad bin Khalifa Al Thani
- Mother: Moza bint Nasser Al-Missned

Hind bint Hamad Al Thani (Arabic: هند بنت حمد بن خليفة آل ثاني; born 15 August 1984) is a Qatari royal. She is the daughter of Hamad bin Khalifa Al Thani and Moza bint Nasser and the sister of Emir Tamim bin Hamad Al Thani. She serves as vice chair and CEO of the Qatar Foundation.

== Education ==
Sheikha Hind holds a bachelor's degree from Duke University in the United States, a master's degree in human rights from University College London, and an International EMBA from HEC Paris in Qatar.

== Career ==
She was Co-Chairperson of the Joint Advisory Board of Northwestern University in Qatar, a partner of Hamad Bin Khalifa University; vice chair of Qatar Foundation board of directors; member of the board of trustees of Qatar Foundation; vice chairperson and chairperson of the executive committee of the Supreme Education Council (now the Ministry of Education and Higher Education), and member of the Governing Council of Interpeace. She was director of Hamad bin Khalifa Al Thani's Office from 2008 to 2013. Concurrently, she held the posts of chairperson of the joint oversight board and chairperson of the executive committee of the College of the North Atlantic Qatar. She is vice chairperson and CEO of Qatar Foundation for Education, Science and Community Development (QF), which was founded by her parents Hamad bin Khalifa Al Thani and Moza bint Nasser Al-Missned.

== Personal life ==
She married Sheikh Faisal bin Thani Al Thani on 2 April 2010 in the Al-Wajbah Palace, Doha. They have 5 sons and 1 daughter.

In September 2021, at the ITU World Triathlon Series event in Hamburg, Sheikha Hind completed her first Olympic distance triathlon.
