= Mohammed bin Jassim Al Thani =

Emir of Qatar from 1913 to 1914

Emir of Qatar
- Reign: 1913–1914
- Predecessor: Ahmed bin Mohammed Al Thani
- Successor: Abdullah bin Jassim Al Thani
- Born: 17 January 1881; Doha, Qatar
- Died: 8 April 1971 (aged 90); Umm Salal Mohammed, Qatar
- Arabic: محمد بن جاسم آل ثاني
- Dynasty: Thani
- Father: Jassim bin Mohammed Al Thani
- Religion: Sunni Islam

Mohammed bin Jassim bin Mohammed Al Thani (Arabic: الشيخ محمد بن جاسم بن محمد آل ثاني; 17 January 1881 – 8 April 1971) was the son of Sheikh Jassim bin Mohammed Al Thani. Sheikh Mohammed had a total of 18 siblings, with him being the seventh of his father's sons.

== Early life ==
Sheikh Mohammed bin Jassim Mohammed Al Thani was born in 1881 in Doha, the capital of Qatar. He reigned for 10 months and abdicated in favour of his brother, Sheikh Abdullah bin Jassim Al Thani. He was appointed by his brothers to become prince of the city of Doha, until his death in 1971. Sheikha Moza bint Nasser Al Misned renovated his house in what is now called Doha Land, Shiekh Mohammed bin Jassim's house is now open to the public.

== Children ==
Sheikh Mohammed bin Jassim Al Thani's wife was Sheikha Aisha bint Ahmed Al Thani, his first cousin. She was the mother of Sheikh Jassim, Sheikh Abdullah and Sheikh Ahmed, Sheikh Mohammed had a total of 27 children 12 sons and 15 daughters. His last wife Sheikha Safiya Al-Kaabi, was known to have been loved dearly and was known to be head chief of all his living wives.

This list is in descending order according to their age, from the eldest son to the youngest. Same is true with the daughters.

1. Sheikh Jassim bin Mohammed bin Jassim Bin Mohammed Al Thani
2. Sheikh Ahmed bin Mohammed bin Jassim Bin Mohammed Al Thani
3. Sheikh Abdullah bin Mohammed bin Jassim Bin Mohammed Al Thani
4. Sheikh Thamir bin Mohammed bin Jassim Al Thani
5. Sheikh Ghanim bin Mohammed Al Thani
6. Sheikh Thani bin Mohammed Al Thani
7. Sheikh Abdulrahman bin Mohammed Al Thani
8. Sheikh Khalid bin Mohammed Al Thani
9. Sheikh Khalifa bin Mohammed Al Thani
10. Sheikh Mansoor bin Mohammed Al Thani
11. Sheikh Falih bin Mohammed Al Thani
12. Sheikh Jabor bin Mohammed Al Thani
13. Sheikha Fatima bint Mohammed Al Thani, married to Sheikh Hassan bin Abdullah bin Jassim Al Thani, her first cousin
14. Sheikha Sarah bint Mohammed Al Thani, married to Sheikh Hamad bin Abdullah bin Jassim Al Thani, her first cousin
15. Sheikha Loulwa bint Mohammed Al Thani, married to Sheikh Ghanim bin Abdulrahman bin Jassim Al Thani, her first cousin
16. Sheikha Hessa bint Mohammed Al Thani, married to Sheikh Khailid bin Abdulrahman bin Jassim Al Thani, her first cousin
17. Sheikha Sheikha bint Mohammed Al Thani, married to Sheikh Saud bin Thani bin Jassim Al Thani, her first cousin
18. Sheikha Noura bint Mohammed Al Thani, married to Sheikh Ahmed bin Thani bin Jassim Al Thani, her first cousin
19. Sheikha Sharifa bint Mohammed Al Thani
20. Sheikha Maryam bint Mohammed Al Thani
21. Sheikha Moza bint Mohammed Al Thani
22. Sheikha Sara bint Mohammed Al Thani
23. Sheikha Rowda bint Mohammed Al Thani
24. Sheikha Hamda bint Mohammed Al Thani
25. Sheikha Alya bint Mohammed Al Thani
26. Sheikha Seeda bint Mohammed Al Thani
