= House of Thani =

Ruling dynasty of Qatar

House of Thani آل ثاني
- Parent house: Ishmaelites; Qedarites tribe; Adnanites; Nizar tribe; Banu Mudar; Khindif; Banu Tamim; Banu Hanzala; Banu Qasem, Bani Ahmed, Bani Jaber, and Bani Thamer; Al-Maadeed
- Country: Qatar
- Founded: c. 1825
- Founder: Thani bin Mohammed
- Current head: Tamim bin Hamad
- Titles: Hakim; Emir; Sheikh
- Traditions: Sunni Islam

The House of Thani (Arabic: آل ثاني, romanised: Āl Thānī) is the ruling family of Qatar, with origins tracing back to the Adnanite Banu Tamim tribe. Currently, Tamim bin Hamad Al Thani leads the house.

Officially, the House of Thani rules Qatar as a constitutional monarchy, but the wide powers retained by the emir and his family have led to it being described as an absolute monarchy and autocracy.

== History ==
=== Origins and basic structure ===
The Al Thani family can be traced back to Mudar ibn Nizar, a claimed descendant of the Biblical figure Ishmael. The tribe moved from the Najdi town of Ushaiger, a settlement north-west of Riyadh, and settled at the Gebrin oasis in southern Najd (present-day Saudi Arabia) before they moved to Qatar. They settled in Qatar around the 1720s. Their first settlement in Qatar was in the southern town of Sikak, and from there they moved north-west to Zubarah, Al Ruwais and then to Fuwayrit. They settled in Doha in the 19th century under their leader Mohammed bin Thani. The group was named after his father Thani bin Mohammed.

The family is made up of three main branches: the Bani Ali, Bani Hamad, and Bani Khalid. As of the early 1990s, the family numbered an estimated 20,000 members.

=== Rise to power ===
Qatar acquired permanent settlements only in the late 19th century. The Al Thanis first emerged as one of Qatar's influential and dominant clans in the 1850s, and accepted the suzerainty of the Ottoman Empire to strengthen their position against rivals. In 1868 the Al Thanis received British recognition of their rule, but still faced some opposition from other clans. They sought a stronger treaty with the British Empire, and eventually achieved it in 1916, greatly contributing to their political consolidation.

In the following decades, the Al Thanis became an almost exclusive centre of power in the country, with the exception of British colonial power. Qatar's geography and relatively short history meant a weak merchant class and hardly any religious establishment, and other local tribes lost almost all power. The political system remained "highly personalist", with decision-making concentrated in the hands of the emir, and sometimes the heir apparent.

=== Discovery of oil and royal factionalism ===
In the 1950s, Britain started prompting the establishment of some state institutions, but throughout the 50s and 60s there was little political development. The discovery and exploitation of oil made the rule of the Al Thanis even more undisputed (and the Al Thanis came to be the only family allowed to name themselves sheikhs), but also increased tensions within the family. All successions, in 1913, 1949, 1960, 1972 and 1995, were contested, and did not go smoothly. The emirs tried to distribute land, oil wealth and political and institutional positions to the family to prevent political challenges, but largely failed, mostly contributing to the further empowerment of the family as a whole.

=== Consolidation of power after Hamad's coup ===
It was only Hamad bin Khalifa Al Thani, once he came to power in a bloodless palace coup in 1995 after gaining support from senior Al Thanis and the United States, that finally managed to concentrate political power more narrowly within the royal family, to himself and an inner circle of trusted relatives. One of his first official acts was changing the constitution so that the position of emir could only go to his sons, whereas before it could go to anyone within the family. He marginalised rivals within the family, and undertook an energetic drive to proliferate institutions of modern governance and entrust them to loyalists.

Qatar scholar Mehran Kamrava argues that Hamad's promises and gestures of political liberalisation early in his rule were intended mostly to gain support from Western democratic countries, and especially the United States, while he safeguarded his rule from Al Thani factionalism, and limited the line of succession only to his own male descendants, whereas before any male Al Thani was eligible. On 25 June 2013, Tamim bin Hamad Al Thani became the Emir of Qatar after his father Hamad bin Khalifa Al Thani handed over power in a televised speech.

== Assets abroad ==
The family and their relatives and associates own significant properties in the Mayfair district of London, with an estimated quarter of Mayfair's 279 acres, including two of the area's best known luxury hotels—The Connaught and Claridge's. The area has acquired the nickname "Little Doha".

== Rulers ==
List of rulers:

- Sheikh Mohammed bin Thani, ruler of Qatar (1851–1878)
- Sheikh Jassim bin Mohammed Al Thani, ruler of Qatar (1878–1898, 1905–1913)
- Sheikh Ahmed bin Mohammed Al Thani, ruled Qatar between 1898 and 1905 (after his brother abdicated in favour of him) until he was killed in 1905, to be replaced again by Jassim
- Sheikh Mohammed bin Jassim Al Thani, ruler of Qatar (1913–1914)
- Sheikh Abdullah bin Jassim Al Thani, ruler of Qatar (1914–1949)
- Sheikh Ali bin Abdullah Al Thani, ruler of Qatar (1949–1960)
- Sheikh Ahmad bin Ali Al Thani, ruler of Qatar (1960–1972), first to bear the title "emir"
- Sheikh Khalifa bin Hamad Al Thani, emir of Qatar (1972–1995)
- Sheikh Hamad bin Khalifa Al Thani, emir of Qatar (1995–2013)
- Sheikh Tamim bin Hamad Al Thani, emir of Qatar (2013–present)

== Family tree ==
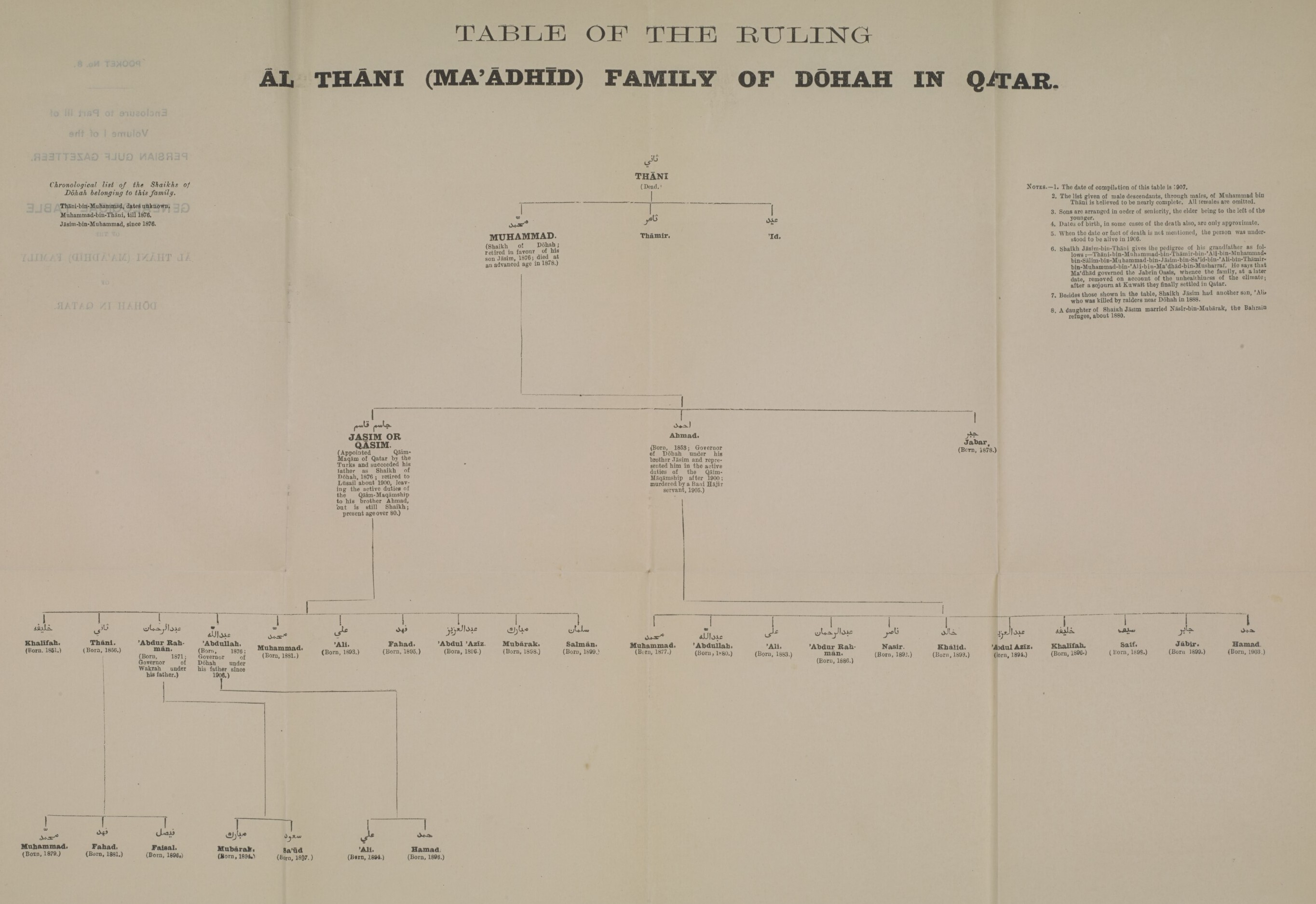
'Genealogical table of the Ruling Āl Thāni (Ma’ādhīd) Family of Dōhah in Qatar', produced in 1915

House of Thani

Muhammad bin Thani^{(1)} r. 1847–1878
Jassim bin Muhammad^{(2)} r. 1878–1913
Abdullah bin Jassim^{(3)} r. 1913–1949
Ali bin Abdullah^{(4)} r. 1949–1960	Hamad bin Abdullah
Ahmad bin Ali^{(5)} r. 1960–1972	Khalifa bin Hamad^{(6)} r. 1972–1995
Hamad bin Khalifa^{(7)} r. 1995–2013
Tamim bin Hamad^{(8)} r. 2013–present

=== Jassim bin Mohammed Al Thani branch ===
- Sheikh Jassim bin Mohammed Al Thani (c. 1825 – 1913), founder of modern Qatar
  - Sheikh Fahad bin Jassim Al Thani I (19th century, died when he was young)
  - Sheikh Khalifa bin Jassim Al Thani (1851–1931)
  - Sheikh Thani bin Jassim Al Thani (1856–1943), Sheikh of Al Gharafa
  - Sheikh Abdulrahman bin Jassim Al Thani (1871–1930), Sheikh of Al Wakra
  - Sheikh Abdullah bin Jassim Al Thani (1880–1957), former Sheikh of Al Rayyan, Ruler of Qatar (1914–1940, 1948–1949)
  - Sheikh Ali bin Jassim Al Thani (19th century, died when he was young)
  - Sheikh Mohammed bin Jassim Al Thani (1881–1971), Sheikh of Umm Salal Mohammed
    - Sheikh Jassim bin Muhammed bin Jassim Al Thani
      - Sheikh Fahad bin Jassim Al Thani (19th century – 1977)
        - Sheikh Faisal bin Fahad Al Thani
        - Sheikh Hamad bin Fahad Al Thani
        - Sheikh Abdullah bin Fahad Al Thani
      - Sheikh Nasir bin Jassim Al Thani
        - Sheikh ??? bin Nasir Al Thani
        - Sheikh ??? bin Nasir Al Thani
        - Sheikh ??? bin Nasir Al Thani
        - Sheikh ??? bin Nasir Al Thani
        - Sheikh ??? bin Nasir Al Thani
      - Sheikh Abdulaziz bin Jassim Al Thani (19th century–1970)
      - Sheikh Khalid bin Jassim Al Thani
        - Sheikh Fahad bin Khalid bin Jassim Al Thani
        - Sheikh ??? bin Khalid Al Thani
      - Sheikh Hamad Bin Jassim Al Thani
        - Sheikh ??? bin Hamad Al Thani
        - Sheikh ??? bin Hamad Al Thani
      - Sheikh Abdulrahman bin Jassim Al Thani
        - Sheikh ??? bin Abdulrahman Al Thani
        - Sheikh ??? bin Abdulrahman Al Thani
        - Sheikh ??? bin Abdulrahman Al Thani
        - Sheikh ??? bin Abdulrahman Al Thani
      - Sheikh Ali bin Jassim Al Thani
      - Sheikh Abdullah bin Jassim Al Thani
        - Sheikh ??? bin Abdullah Al Thani
        - Sheikh ??? bin Abdullah Al Thani
        - Sheikh ??? bin Abdullah Al Thani
        - Sheikh ??? bin Abdullah Al Thani
      - Sheikh Khalifa bin Jassim Al Thani (1959)
        - Sheikh Jassim bin Khalifa Al Thani
        - Sheikh Mohammed bin Khalifa Al Thani
        - Sheikh Sultan bin Khalifa Al Thani
        - Sheikh Ahmed bin Khalifa Al Thani
        - Sheikha Najla bint Khalifa Al Thani
        - Sheikha Reem bint Khalifa Al Thani
      - Sheikh Salman Bin Jassim Al Thani
        - Sheikh ??? bin Salman Al Thani
        - Sheikh ??? bin Salman Al Thani
        - Sheikh ??? bin Salman Al Thani
      - Sheikh Saud Bin Jassim Al Thani
        - Sheikh ??? bin Saud Al Thani
        - Sheikh ??? bin Saud Al Thani
        - Sheikh ??? bin Saud Al Thani
        - Sheikh ??? bin Saud Al Thani
      - Sheikh Sultan bin Jassim Al Thani, married
      - Sheikh Faysal bin Jassim Al Thani
        - Sheikh ??? bin Faysal Al Thani
      - Sheikh Hasan bin Jassim Al Thani
        - Sheikh ??? Hamid Mohammed
      - Sheikha Noor bint Jassim Al Thani, married
      - Sheikha Rowdha bint Jassim Al Thani, married to Abdullah bin Ahmad Bin Abdullah
      - Sheikha Amna bint Jassim Al Thani, married to Khalid bin Hamad bin Abdullah
      - Sheikha Al-Anoud bint Jassim Al Thani, married, with two sons and two daughters
      - Sheikha Tamather bint Jassim Al Thani
      - Sheikha Fatma bint Jassim Al Thani
      - Sheikha Muna bint Jassim Al Thani
      - Sheikha Jawaher bint Jassim Al Thani
      - Sheikha Sheikha bint Jassim Al Thani
      - Sheikha Maha bint Jassim Al Thani
      - Sheikha Moneera bint Jassim Al Thani
      - Sheikha Khowla bint Jassim Al Thani
      - Sheikha Leena bint Jassim Al Thani
      - Sheikha Loolwa bint Jassim Al Thani
      - Sheikha Mariam bint Jassim Al Thani
      - Sheikha Noora bint Jassim Al Thani
  - Sheikh Ghanim bin Jassim Al Thani (1880s 2nd millennium)
  - Sheikh Ali bin Jassim Al Thani II (1893–1972), Sheikh of Umm Salal Ali
  - Sheikh Fahad bin Jassim Al Thani II (19th century, died young)
  - Sheikh Fahad bin Jassim Al Thani III (1897 – c. 1980), Sheikh of Al Khiesa, settled in Rumeliah and Adba
  - Sheikh Abdulaziz bin Jassim Al Thani (1896–1985), Sheikh of Al Markhiya
  - Sheikh Salman bin Jassim Al Thani (19th century, died during/soon after his birth)
  - Sheikh Idris bin Jassim Al Thani (19th century, died during/soon after his birth)
  - Sheikh Mubarak bin Jassim Al Thani (19th century, died during/soon after his birth)
  - Sheikh Salman bin Jassim Al Thani II (1899–1984), Sheikh of Dukhan
  - Sheikh Nasser bin Jassim Al Thani (1900s – 1978), Sheikh of Nasiriya
  - Sheikh Sultan bin Jassim Al Thani (1900s – 1976), Sheikh of Umm Al Amad
  - Sheikh Ahmed bin Jassim Al Thani (1900s – 1995), Sheikh of Al Khor
    - Sheikh Khawar bin Ahmed Al Thani, Emir of Al Khor since 1996
      - Sheikh Fahad bin Khawar Al Thani
      - Sheikha ??? bint Khawar Al Thani
      - Sheikha ??? bint Khawar Al Thani
  - Sheikh Jassim bin Mohammed Al Thani (ca. 1825–1913), founder of Modern Qatar
    - Sheikh Muhammed bin Jassim Al Thani, de facto ruler
      - Sheikh Jassim bin Muhammed bin Jassim Al Thani
      - Sheikh Ahmed bin Mohammed Al Thani
      - Sheikh Abdullah bin Mohammed Al Thani
        - Sheikh Saoud bin Abdullah bin Mohammed Al Thani
      - Sheikh Thamir bin Mohammed bin Jassim Al Thani
      - Sheikh Ghanim bin Mohammed Al Thani
      - Sheikh Thani bin Mohammed Al Thani
      - Sheikh Abdulrahman bin Mohammed Al Thani
      - Sheikh Khalid bin Mohammed Al Thani
      - Sheikh Khalifa bin Mohammed Al Thani
      - Sheikh Mubarak bin Mohammed Al Thani
      - Sheikh Musa'id bin Mohammed Al Thani
      - Sheikh Hassan bin Mohammed Al Thani
      - Sheikh Mansoor bin Mohammed Al Thani
      - Sheikh Falih bin Mohammed Al Thani
      - Sheikh Jabor bin Mohammed Al Thani
      - Sheikh Ali bin Mohammed Al Thani
      - Sheikh Saud bin Mohammed Al Thani
      - Sheikha Fatima bint Mohammed Al Thani
      - Sheikha Sarah bint Mohammed Al Thani
      - Sheikha Loulwa bint Mohammed Al Thani
      - Sheikha Hessa bint Mohammed Al Thani
      - Sheikha Sheikha bint Mohammed Al Thani
      - Sheikha Noura bint Mohammed Al Thani
    - Sheikh Ali bin Jassim Al Thani
    - Sheikh Abdullah bin Jassim Al Thani, ruler
      - Sheikh Ali bin Abdullah Al Thani, ruler
        - Sheikh Ahmad bin Ali Al Thani, emir
          - Sheikh Abdelaziz bin Ahmed Al Thani (1945–2008), ex-crown prince (in exile)
        - Sheikh Muhammed bin Ali Al Thani
          - Sheikh Abdullah bin Mohammed Al Thani (Sharjah)
          - Sheikh Saud bin Muhammed Al Thani
      - Sheikh Hassan bin Abdullah Al Thani
        - Sheikh Sultan bin Hassan bin Abdullah Al Thani
          - Sheikh Abdulrahman bin Sultan bin Hassan Al Thani
            - Sheikh Sultan bin Abdulrahman Al Thani
            - Sheikha Sara bint Abdulrahman Al Thani
      - Sheikh Hamad bin Abdullah Al Thani, crown prince (died before his father)
        - Sheikh Ahmed bin Hamad Al Thani
          - Sheikh Saud bin Ahmed Al Thani, (born 1969) former Qatari footballer
        - Sheikh Jassim bin Hamad bin Abdullah Al Thani
          - Sheikh Hamad bin Jassim bin Hamad Al Thani
        - Sheikh Abdelaziz bin Hamad Al Thani
          - Sheikh Saud bin Abdelaziz bin Hamad Al Thani
        - Sheikh Mohammed bin Hamad bin Abdullah Al Thani
        - Sheikh Khalid bin Hamad Al Thani
          - Sheikh Abdullah bin Khalid Al Thani
          - Sheikh Hamad bin Khalid Al Thani
        - Sheikh Suhaim bin Hamad Al Thani
          - Sheikh Hamad bin Suhaim Al Thani
            - Sheikha Jawaher bint Hamad Al Thani
        - Sheikh Khalifa bin Hamad Al Thani, emir
          - Sheikh Abdelaziz bin Khalifa Al Thani
          - Sheikh Abdullah bin Khalifa Al Thani
          - Sheikh Mohammed bin Khalifa Al Thani
          - Sheikh Hamad bin Khalifa Al Thani, emir until 25 June 2013
            - Sheikh Mishaal bin Hamad Al Thani, heir apparent (until 1996)
            - Sheikh Fahad bin Hamad bin Khalifa Al Thani
            - Sheikh Jasim bin Hamad Al Thani, heir apparent (until 2003)
            - Sheikh Tamim bin Hamad Al Thani, emir from 25 June 2013
            - Sheikh Joaan bin Hamad Al Thani
            - Sheikh Mohammed bin Hamad Al Thani
            - Sheikh Khalid bin Hamad Al Thani
            - Sheikh Abdullah bin Hamad Al Thani, deputy emir
            - Sheikha Alanoud bint Hamad Al Thani
            - Sheikh Thani bin Hamad Al Thani
            - Sheikh Khalifa bin Hamad Al Thani
    - Sheikh Fahad bin Jassim Al Thani
      - Sheikh Jassim bin Fahad Al Thani
      - Sheikh Saud bin Fahad Al Thani
      - Sheikh Hassan bin Fahad Al Thani
      - Sheikh Mubarak bin Fahad Al Thani
      - Sheikh Faleh bin Fahad Al Thani
      - Sheikh Nasser bin Fahad Al Thani
    - Sheikh Abdulrahman bin Jassim Al Thani
    - Sheikh Thani bin Jassim bin Muhammed Al Thani
      - Sheikh Muhammed bin Thani Al Thani
        - Sheikh Thamir bin Muhammed bin Thani Al Thani
          - Sheikh Hamad bin Thamir Al Thani

=== The Ahmed bin Muhammed Al Thani branch ===
- Sheikh Ahmed bin Muhammed Al Thani, Governor of Doha
  - Sheikh Khalifa bin Ahmed Al Thani
    - Sheikh Nasser bin Khalifa Al Thani
      - Sheikh Abdullah bin Nasser bin Khalifa Al Thani, Prime Minister and Interior Minister of Qatar (2013-20)
  - Sheikh Saif bin Ahmed Al Thani
    - Sheikh Ahmed bin Saif Al Thani
      - Sheikh Saif bin Ahmed Al Thani
      - Sheikh Mohammed bin Ahmed Al Thani
      - Sheikh Jamal bin Ahmed Al Thani

=== The Jaber bin Muhammed Al Thani branch ===
- Sheikh Jaber bin Muhammed Al Thani (1878–1934)
  - Sheikh Jassim bin Jaber Al Thani
    - Sheikh Yousif bin Jassim Al Thani
    - Sheikh Jabor bin Jassim Al Thani
    - Sheikh Fahad bin Jassim Al Thani
    - Sheikh Hamad bin Jassim bin Jaber Al Thani (1959), Foreign Minister of Qatar (1992–2013), Prime Minister of Qatar (2007–2013)
      - Sheikh Jabor bin Hamad Al Thani
      - Sheikh Mohammed bin Hamad Al Thani
      - Sheikh Fahad bin Hamad Al Thani
      - Sheikh Tamim bin Hamad Al Thani
      - Sheikh Falah Bin Hamad Al Thani
      - Sheikha Alanoud bint Hamad Al Thani
    - Sheikh Falah bin Jassim Al Thani
    - Sheikh Mansoor bin Jassim Al Thani
    - Sheikh Nawaf bin Jassim Al Thani
  - Sheikh Muhammad bin Jabr Al Thani (1916–1983)
    - Sheikh Jaber bin Muhammad Al Thani

== See also ==
- Emir of Qatar
- List of Sunni Muslim dynasties
- Collecting practices of the Al-Thani Family
- Little Doha, an area of London with a high concentration of properties owned by the Al Thani family
