= Mishaal bin Hamad Al Thani =

Former heir apparent of Qatar (born 1972)

Mishaal bin Hamad bin Khalifa Al Thani مشعل بن حمد بن خليفة الثاني
- Born: 2 July 1972 (age 53); Doha
- House: Thani
- Father: Hamad bin Khalifa Al Thani
- Mother: Mariam bint Muhammad Al Thani

Mishaal bin Hamad bin Khalifa Al Thani (Arabic: مشعل بن حمد بن خليفة الثاني; born 2 July 1972) is a member of the House of Thani.

== Early life ==
Sheikh Mishaal is the first son and oldest child of the former Emir of Qatar, Sheikh Hamad bin Khalifa Al Thani, and his first wife, Sheikha Mariam bint Muhammad Al Thani. He is the oldest brother of the current Emir Sheikh Tamim bin Hamad Al Thani.

== Career ==
Sheikh Mishaal was named as the crown prince on 30 June 1995, three days after his father became the emir. He began to work at the ministry of foreign affairs, heading Qatari missions. He served as crown prince until 23 October 1996 when he was replaced by his half-brother Jassim bin Hamad. Hamad once told a Western ambassador that of his two eldest sons, "one [plays] too much; the other prays too much.". Sheikh Mishaal is understood to be the one that played too much.

He was the chairman of the Al Rayyan Sports Club, and member of Qatar Racing & Equestrian Club (QREC). He is president of the Arab Equestrian Federation. He is an enthusiast of pigeon racing as well and has raced many pigeons to victory in various competitions.

== Personal life ==
Sheikh Mishal bin Hamad bin Khalifa Al Thani has three sons and four daughters:

Sons:

- Sheikh Abdullah bin Mishal bin Hamad Al Thani - Member of Qatar Racing and Equestrian Club (QREC).
- Sheikh Muhammad bin Mishal bin Hamad Al Thani.
- Sheikh Hamad bin Mishal bin Hamad Al Thani.

Daughters:

- Sheikha Rowdha bint Mishal bin Hamad Al Thani.
- Sheikha Mariam bint Mishal bin Hamad Al Thani.
- Sheikha Aisha bint Mishal bin Hamad Al Thani.
- Sheikha Sara bint Mishal bin Hamad Al Thani.

All members of his family are racehorse owners and closely involved in the Equestrian sports.
