= Mohammed bin Hamad Al Thani (born 1988) =

Qatari sheikh

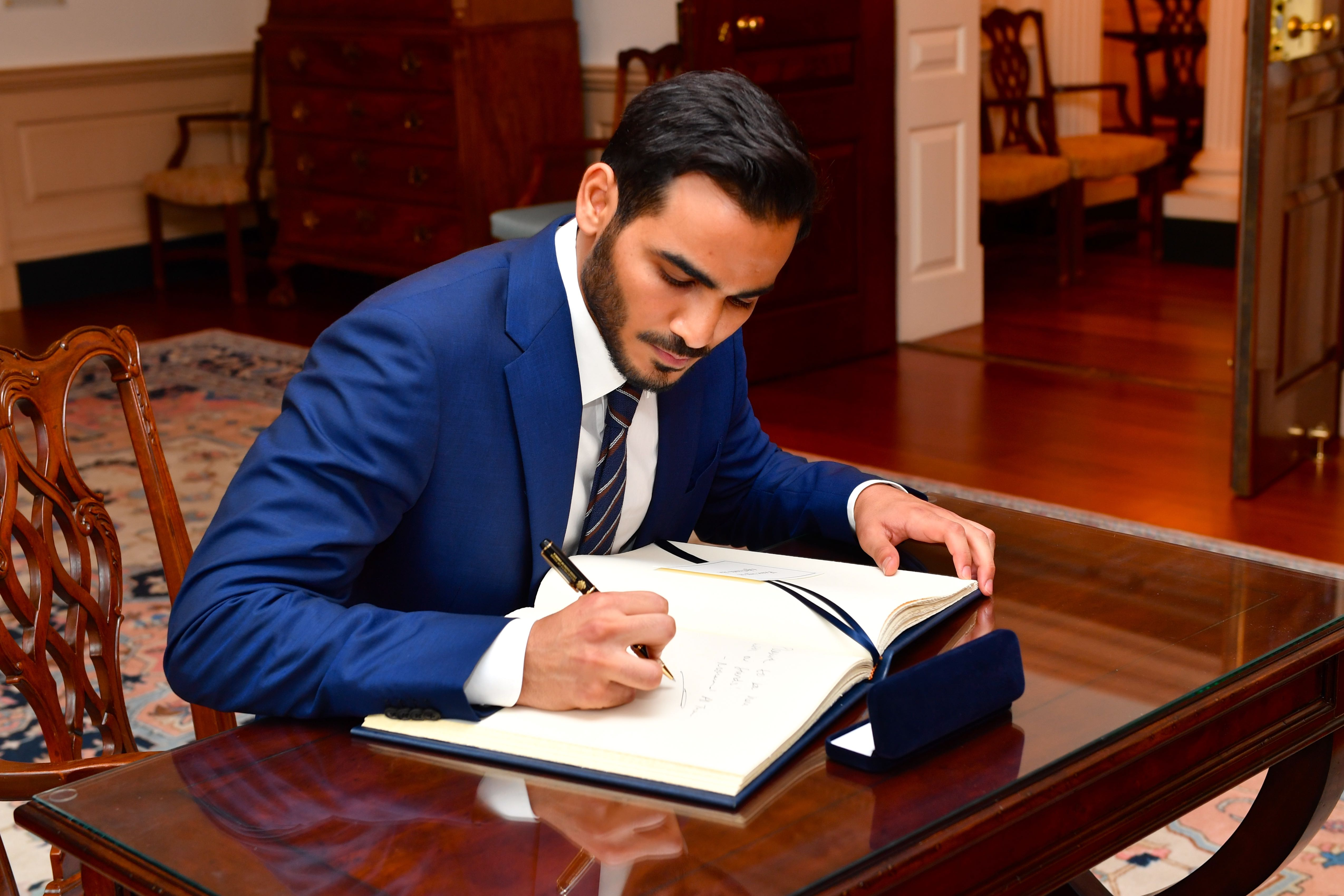
- Sheikh Mohammed bin Hamad bin Khalifa Al Thani signing Rex Tillerson's guestbook, 2017
- Born: 18 April 1988 (age 38)
- House: Thani
- Father: Hamad bin Khalifa Al Thani
- Mother: Moza bint Nasser Al-Missned

Mohammed bin Hamad bin Khalifa Al Thani (Arabic: محمد بن حمد بن خليفة آل ثاني; born 18 April 1988) is a member of the House of Thani. He is the brother of the Emir of Qatar, Sheikh Tamim bin Hamad Al Thani and the son of the former Emir of Qatar, Sheikh Hamad bin Khalifa Al Thani, with his second wife Sheikha Moza bint Nasser Al-Missned.

== Early life and education ==
Sheikh Mohammed holds a bachelor's degree in international politics from the Georgetown University School of Foreign Service in Qatar in 2009 and a master's degree in public administration from Harvard University’s Kennedy School of Government ('13).

Sheikh Mohammed is a former captain of the Qatar equestrian team, and as such, lit the cauldron of the Doha 2006 Asian Games on horseback.

== Career ==
In 2010 Sheikh Mohammed led Qatar's winning bid to host the 2022 FIFA World Cup, bringing the tournament to the Middle East for the first time.

Sheikh Mohammed is currently the managing director, a board member, and co-chair of the executive committee, of the State of Qatar’s Supreme Committee for Delivery and Legacy (formerly Qatar 2022 Supreme Committee), the body responsible for the oversight and delivery of stadiums and related infrastructure for the 2022 FIFA World Cup Qatar.

In 2017, Sheikh Mohammed was appointed to the role of Secretary to His Highness the Emir for Investment Affairs, in which capacity he represents the Emir of Qatar in high level strategic and investment discussions with a particular focus on the US market.

Sheikh Mohammed is the vice chairman of the Qatar Investment Authority board of directors. He is a member of the Board of Trustees at Qatar Foundation.
