= Thani bin Jassim Al Thani (1856–1943) =

Thani bin Jassim bin Muhammed Al Thani (1856–1943) was the sheikh of Al Gharrafa. His father, Jassim bin Mohammed Al Thani –from the ruling al Thani family– was the ruler of Qatar.

Life and career

Thani bin Jassim bin Mohammed Al Thani (1856–1943) was a son of Jassim bin Mohammed Al Thani, the founder of modern Qatar. Thani was also a prominent pearl merchant and was described as one of the best-known pearl traders in Qatar during his lifetime, with a reputation extending throughout the Persian Gulf. The pearl trade was an important component of Qatar's economy during this period and contributed significantly to the wealth and influence of the Al Thani family.

Among his sons were Sheikh Jassim bin Thani Al Thani (1917–2014), who became known as a historian of Qatar, and Sheikh Faisal bin Thani Al Thani, who served as Qatar's Minister of Industry and Agriculture from 1972.
