= Hamad bin Jassim bin Hamad Al Thani =

Qatari police official (born 1949)

Shaikh Hamad bin Jassim bin Hamad bin Abdullah bin Jassim bin Muhammed Al Thani (Arabic: حمد بن جاسم بن حمد آل ثاني; born 1949) is a member of Qatar's royal family, the House of Thani. He was the commander in chief of the Qatar Police from 1972 to 1977 and Minister for Economy and Trade from 1977 to 1986.

== Education ==
Born in Doha, he finished his primary and high school in Qatar, and later was sent to the American University of Beirut in Lebanon. He then attended police course training in the Royal Military Academy Sandhurst.

== 1996 Qatari coup d'état attempt ==
Sheikh Hamad bin Jassim bin Hamad was found guilty of staging an abortive coup to restore Emir Hamad bin Khalifa Al Thani's father Khalifa bin Hamad Al Thani to the throne in 1996. He stayed abroad for over three years. In 1998 Qatari secret forces directed his private jet on a flight from Beirut in midair to Qatar. He was sentenced to hanging along with 32 co-conspirators on 21 May 2001. However, he was released in 2008.

== Children ==
- Khalifa bin Hamad
- Khalid bin Hamad
- Jassim bin Hamad
- Abdulrahman bin Hamad
- Sultan bin Hamad
- Sheikha bint Hamad

== Sources ==
- AR: SHK Hamad Page In Althani Family Tree
- AR: Althani Family Tree
