= Samira Jassim =

Iraqi insurgent

Samira Ahmed Jassim al-Azzawi or Samira Jassam (born 1958), also known as Um al-Mumenin, "the mother of the believers", is alleged to have worked with Sunni militants from the Ansar al-Sunnah group in Diyala province.

Jassim has been detained by Iraqi security forces since 21 January 2009. She is alleged to have admitted, in an apparent video confession, that she identified and recruited potential suicide bombers and helped them carry out missions. Additionally, Jassim confessed, in an interview with the Associated Press, how she and insurgents used rape as a "tool" to recruit women suicide bombers—"shamed" rape victims are alleged to have been persuaded to "redeem themselves through suicide attacks".
