= Moza bint Nasser =

Chairperson of the Qatar Foundation

Moza bint Nasser al-Misnad
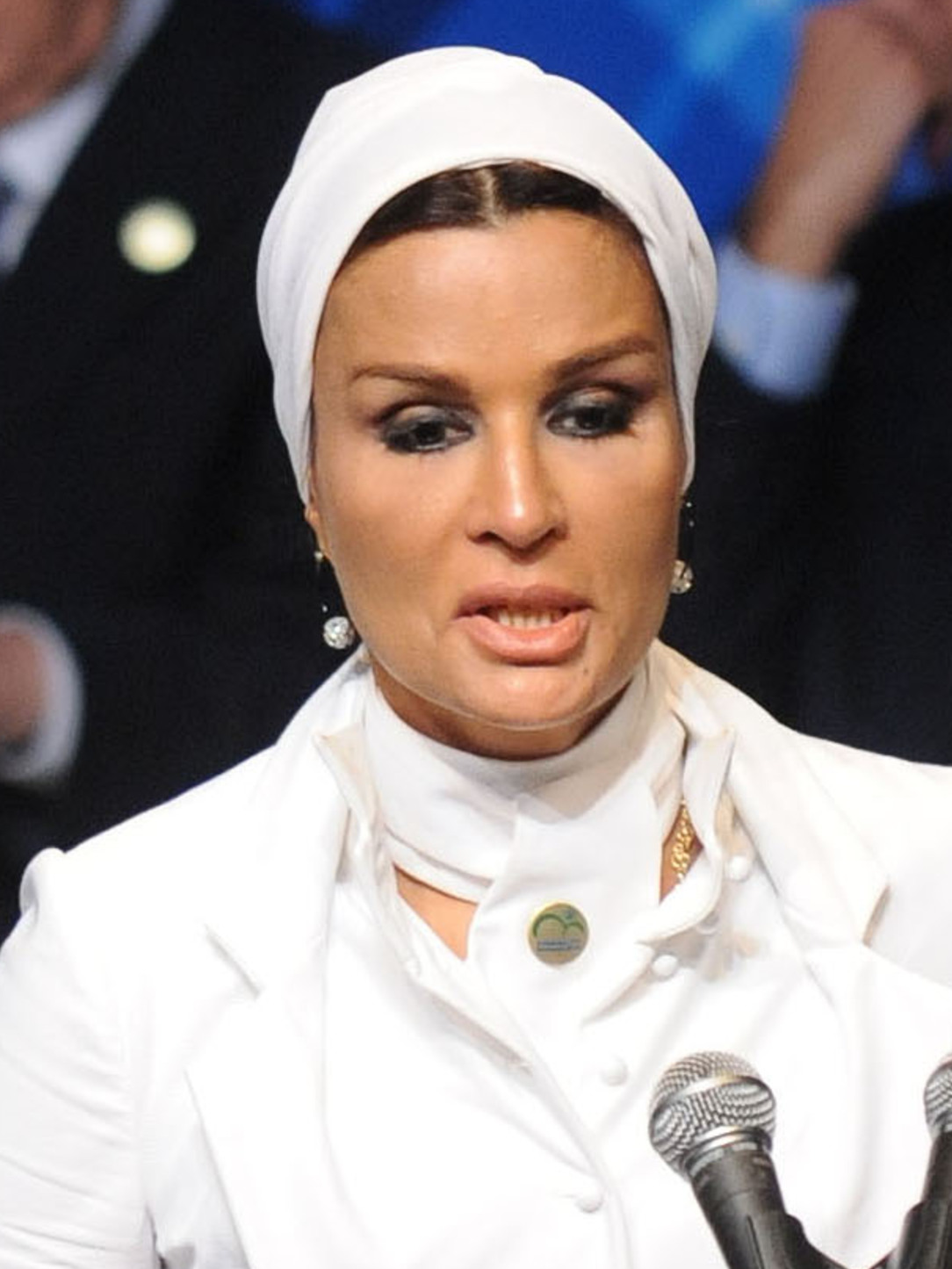
- Sheikha Moza addressing the Third Global Forum of the UN Alliance of Civilizations in Rio de Janeiro, Brazil (2010)

Consort to the Emir of Qatar
- Tenure: 27 June 1995 – 25 June 2013
- Born: 8 August 1959 (age 67); Al Khor, Qatar
- Spouse: Hamad bin Khalifa Al Thani (m. 1977; died 2026)
- Issue: Sheikh Jassim bin Hamad; Sheikh Tamim bin Hamad Al Thani, Emir of Qatar; Sheikha Al-Mayassa bint Hamad; Sheikha Hind bint Hamad; Sheikh Joaan bin Hamad; Sheikh Mohammed bin Hamad; Sheikh Khalifa bin Hamad
- Father: Nasser bin Abdullah al-Misnad
- Occupation: Chair, Qatar Foundation; UNESCO Special Envoy for Basic and Higher Education, 2003–2023; Chair of the Board, Arab Democracy Foundation; United Nations Advocate for Sustainable Development Goals

Moza bint Nasser al-Misnad (Arabic: موزا بنت ناصر المسند; born 8 August 1959) is the mother of Sheikh Tamim bin Hamad Al Thani, the emir of Qatar. She was one of three consorts to his father, Sheikh Hamad bin Khalifa Al Thani, who was emir from 1995 to 2013. She is the co-founder and chair of the Qatar Foundation, the largest state-owned nonprofit organization in the country.

== Early life and education ==
Sheikha Moza is the daughter of Nasser bin Abdullah al-Misnad, a well-known opposition activist and former head of the Al-Muhannada confederation of Bani Hajer. Born in Qatar, she spent much of her childhood in Kuwait during her father's exile following imprisonment for political activities and defiance against the policies of the deposed emir Ahmad bin Ali Al Thani. Nasser returned to Qatar with his immediate family in 1977, the same year Moza married Hamad bin Khalifa Al Thani, the heir apparent of Qatar. Sheikha Moza is the second of his three wives.

Sheikha Moza received a BA degree in Sociology from Qatar University in 1986, and holds a MA degree in Public Policy in Islam from Hamad Bin Khalifa University.

== Areas of work and philanthropy ==
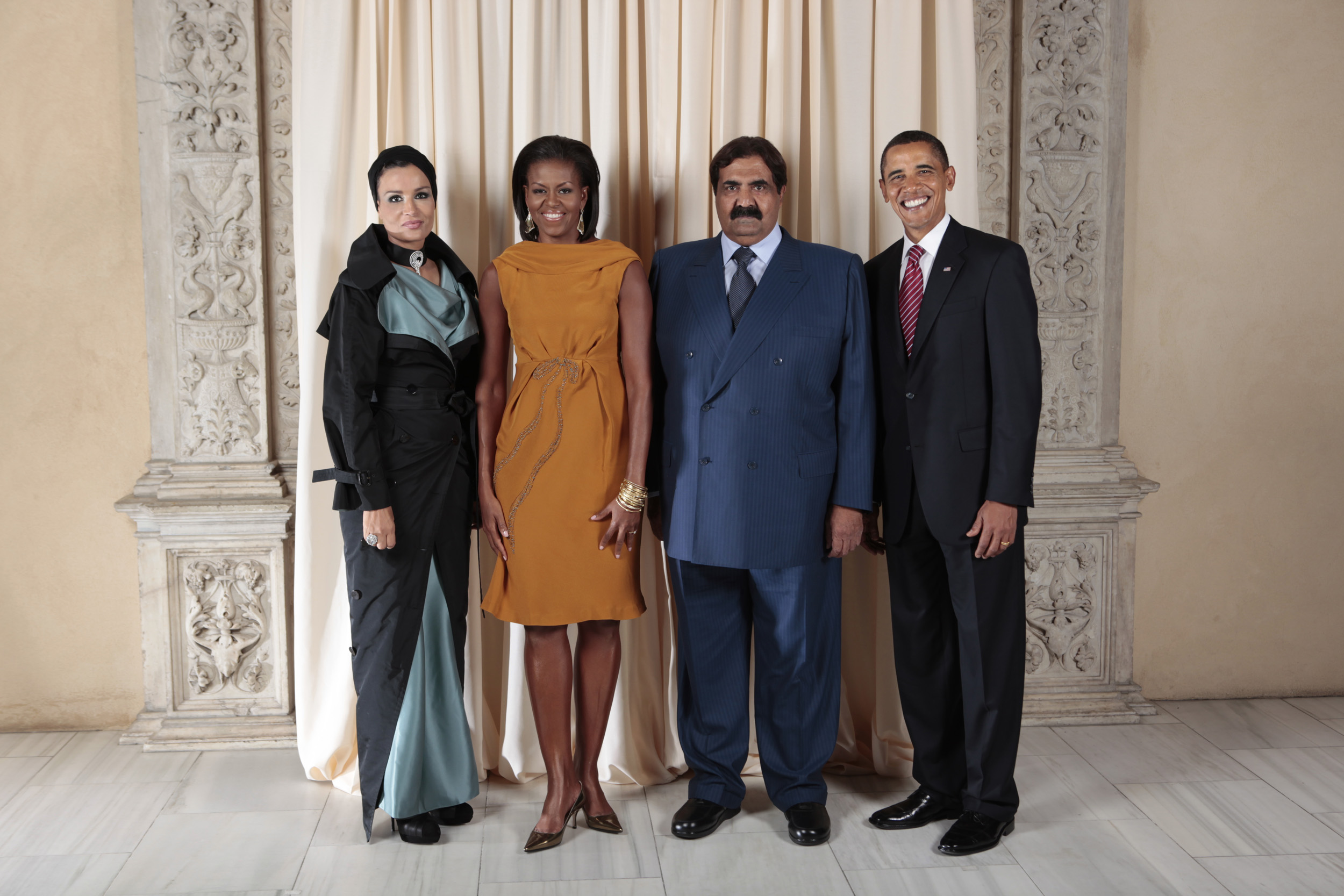
Sheikha Moza with her husband at the Metropolitan Museum in New York City. From left to right: Sheikha Moza, Michelle Obama, the US First Lady, Sheikh Hamad bin Khalifa Al-Thani, and Barack Obama, the US president.

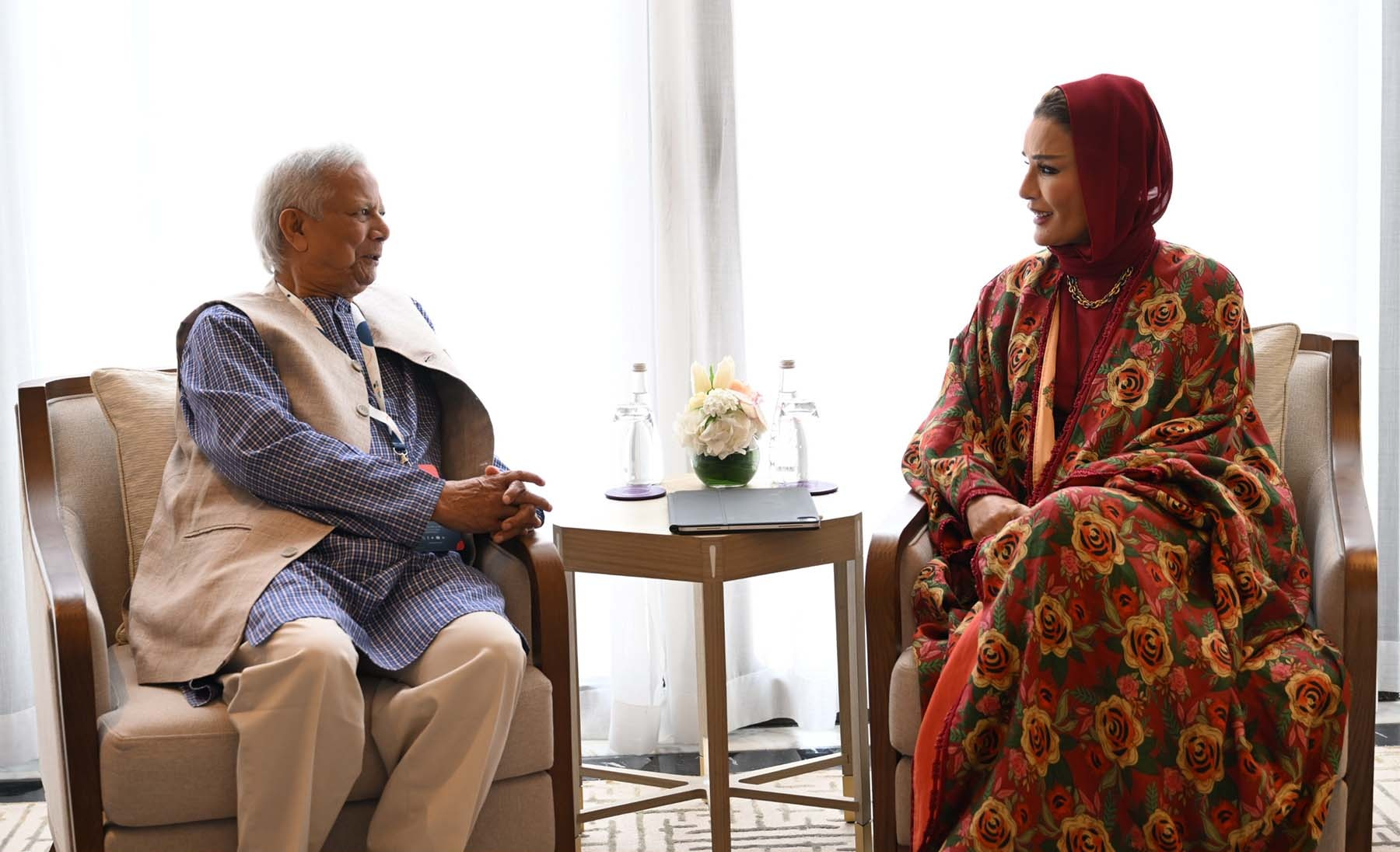
Sheikha Moza with Bangladeshi economist and statesman Muhammad Yunus

Sheikha Moza co-founded and chairs the Qatar Foundation for Education, Science and Community Development (QF), which was set up in 1995. She has dedicated her efforts to advancing education reforms in Qatar through the QF. This non-profit organization was established by her husband the same year he assumed the role of emir. Sheikha Moza established Education Above All in 2012, aiming to make education accessible to marginalized children globally.

She has had a major role in the opening of US universities in Education City in Doha. Dubbed “The woman behind Doha’s Education City” as part of Qatar's soft power strategy on Western universities.

Sheikha Moza has been vocal in advocating for the protection of education in warzones, and Protect Education in Insecurity and Conflict (PEIC) was established under the auspices of Education Above All with the aim of promoting and providing education to children living in areas of conflict and war. After Qatar advocated for the establishment of 9 September as the International Day to Protect Education from Attack, established by unanimous resolution of the UN General Assembly, Sheikha Moza has spoken at each observance of the Day: online in 2020 and 2021, at UNESCO in Paris in 2022, at the United Nations Headquarters in New York in 2023, and in Doha in 2024.

Sheikha Moza has acted as chairperson of Silatech since 2008, chairperson of the Arab Democracy Foundation, and founded the Supreme Council for Family Affairs in 1998. She was vice president of the Supreme Education Council from 2002 until 2012 and was made UNESCO's Special Envoy for Basic and Higher Education in 2003, a position she resigned in November 2023, because of UNESCO's silence about the plight of Palestinian children. In 2002, she and former Emir Hamad bin Khalifa Al Thani opened the Weill Cornell Medical College in Qatar. She is a member of the Board of Overseers of Weill Cornell Medicine, and chairperson of Sidra Medical and Research Center, a high-tech women's and children's hospital in Doha. She also endowed this medical center with $7.9 billion.

Baraem, "the first Pan-Arabic preschool channel", was said to have launched "under her patronage" in 2009, and she was given credit by Executive General Manager of Al Jazeera Children’s Channel at the time for Baraem having stemmed from her "full vision".

According to Human Rights Watch, Sheikha Moza's Education Above All scholarship program requires non-Qatari female students who wish to study to provide a "signed consent letter and undertaking by family guardian (allowing EAA to access and confirm private information of the family)."

In 2010, she played a key role in the campaign to host the 2022 FIFA World Cup. She denies the accusations of Qatari corruption in the FIFA world cup process.

In 2020, a book called Pregnancy and Miscarriage in Qatar: Women, Reproduction and the State discussed the changing role of women in Qatari society, and analysed how Qatari women navigate the competing expectations placed upon them, in which Sheikha Moza played an essential role in reflecting the nation as a centre of Arab modernity, availing themselves of the new opportunities in work, politics and public life. Sheikha Moza herself has sought to clarify that she is "not a feminist".

== Political role ==
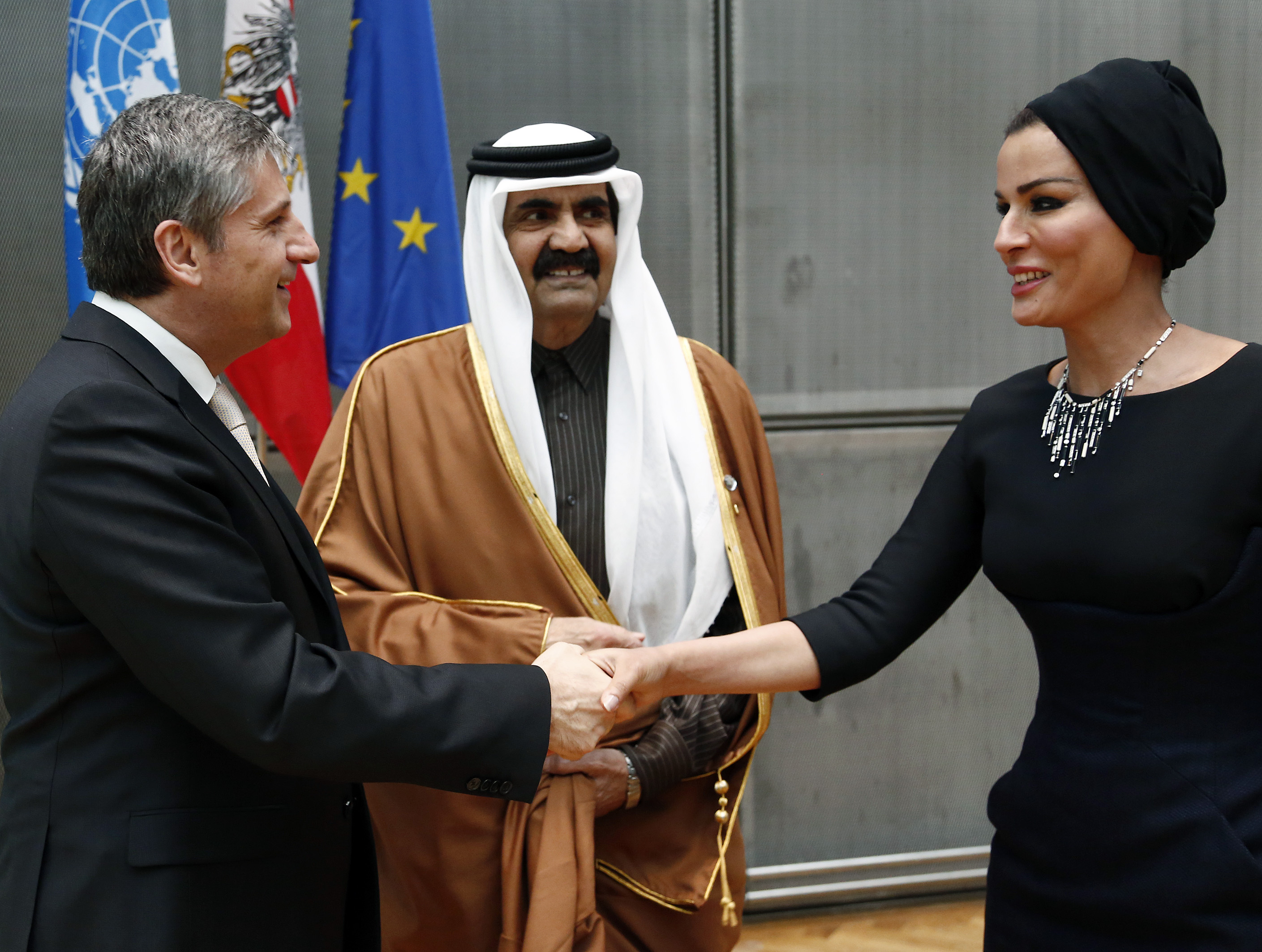
Sheikha Moza in the 5th Global Forum of the UN Alliance of Civilizations, 2013

According to reports, Sheikha Moza plays a significant role in shaping Qatar's political, social, and foreign relations as part of the country's soft power strategy. She holds considerable influence and often utilizes her public platform to express strong political opinions.

Sheikha Moza has been an important figure in the Qatar Foundation, an organization instrumental in Qatar's global outreach and image rebranding. Co-founding and chairing the foundation, she contributes significantly to fostering Qatar's international relations through initiatives such as the establishment of campuses of Western universities in Qatar. This aligns with Qatar's broader strategy of building connections with Western states through philanthropy and educational partnerships. Sheikha Moza's influence is evident in the nation's strategic decisions and her active role in shaping Qatar's international image, particularly in the realms of education and humanitarian efforts.

In January 2024, a global media campaign launched, carrying the slogans "It's in your hands" and "You have the power". The campaign called on Sheikha Moza to leverage her authority to ensure the release of 136 hostages held by Hamas in Gaza. This has been called a "shadow campaign" and some of the names behind have been found to be fictitious.

Sheikha Moza writes online on issues related to the Israeli–Palestinian conflict. Actively engaging on social media, she predominantly focuses on the situation in Gaza, aligning her sentiments with Qatari policy. Following the October 7, 2023 Hamas-led attack on Israel, which killed around 1,200 Israelis and led to the abduction of 245 hostages and the Israeli response that day which killed more than 1,000 Palestinians, Sheikha Moza posted a picture on her Instagram account of a man with hands on his head in front of a demolished building, accompanied by the caption: "O Allah, we entrust Palestine to you." It was reported that since then, Sheikha Moza has regularly criticized Israel on social media. She has posted on Instagram mostly about the destruction in Gaza caused by Israeli airstrikes, often posting news about the thousands of children being killed. On 9 September 2024, she published an opinion piece in Le Point on "The Human Cost of War". On October 18, 2024, she posted on X (formerly Twitter) a tweet marking the killing of Hamas-leader Yahya Sinwar. She wrote that, as his name means "the one who lives", his memory will live on.

== Public image ==
Because of her multiple roles in recent Qatari history and heading the Qatar Foundation, Sheikha Moza has been referred to as "the actual ruler of Qatar". The Guardian has labelled her "the enlightened face of a profoundly conservative regime", and stated that she "represents one of the world’s most repressive families".

In 2007 and 2010, Sheikha Moza was listed as one of the '100 Most Powerful Women' by Forbes. She was also listed in the 'Top 100 most powerful Arabs' from 2013 to 2017 by Gulf Business. In 2011 she placed second on the Vanity Fair International Best Dressed Women's list, and in 2015 she was named in the Vanity Fair International Best Dressed Hall of Fame List. According to Vogue, she has customised haute couture designs to fit Qatari modesty rules. She has been involved with Fashion Trust Arabia (FTA), launched in September 2018, which focuses on womenswear designs.

According to The Guardian, the 2021 Pandora Papers disclosed that in 2013 Sheikha Moza purchased two of London's priciest residences for £120 million. According to the leaked records, the acquisition was arranged through a network of offshore entities in various tax havens, a setup that lawfully lowered the stamp duty on the properties by about £18.5 million.

According to a Los Angeles Times investigation published in July 2020, Sheikha Moza's son Khalifa bin Hamad bin Khalifa Al Thani was accepted to the University of Southern California (USC) as a transfer student from the community college Los Angeles Mission College after she met USC president C. L. Max Nikias in 2012 in Los Angeles, California, at the behest of USC trustee Thomas J. Barrack Jr.

According to scholarly research, firms owned by the al-Misnad family, which Sheikha Moza belongs to, "are among the most prominent contractors in the mammoth infrastructural development projects funded by Qatar Foundation, which is headed by Shaikha Moza". While the research clarifies that there is no way to know the basis on which al-Misnad firms win bids for projects funded by Qatar Foundation, it notes that "there is a widespread assumption in the country (Qatar) that these bids are awarded largely because of the Al Misnad’s family ties to Shaikha Moza".

== Titles, styles, and honours ==
Styles of Sheikha Moza
- Reference style: Her Highness
- Spoken style: Your Highness
- Alternative style: Sheikha

Coat of arms as dame of the Order of Isabella the Catholic (Spain)

=== Titles and styles ===
Bint Nasser may be styled as "Her Highness Sheikha Moza bint Nasser".

=== Honours ===
==== Foreign honours ====
- Croatia
  - Grand Cross of the Grand Order of Queen Jelena
- Italy
  - Grand Cross of the Order of Merit of the Italian Republic
- Malaysia
  - Honorary Grand Commander of the Order of the Defender of the Realm (SMN (K)) – Tun (2010)
- Morocco
  - Dame of the Order of Muhammad
- Netherlands
  - Dame Grand Cross of the Order of the Netherlands Lion
  - Recipient of the King Willem-Alexander Inauguration Medal
- Portugal
  - Grand Cross of the Order of Infante Henry
- Spain
  - Dame Grand Cross of the Order of Isabella the Catholic
- United Kingdom
  - Honorary Dame Commander of the Order of the British Empire

==== Foreign awards ====
- Poland
  - Member of the Decoration of the Smile
- United Kingdom
  - Royal Institute of International Affairs: Chatham House Prize
- United States
  - Recipient of the Andrew Carnegie Medal of Philanthropy
  - Georgetown University: honorary Degree of Doctor of Humane Letters
  - Carnegie Mellon University: honorary Degree of Doctor of Humane Letters
  - George Bush Presidential Library: George Bush Award for Excellence in Public Service
  - Virginia Commonwealth University: honorary Degree of Doctor of Humane Letters
  - Georgetown University President's Medal
- Pakistan
  - Recipient of the Hilal-e-Pakistan Civilian Award.

==== Honorary doctorates ====
She was awarded an honorary Doctor of Humane Letters from Virginia Commonwealth University in 2003. She also holds honorary doctorates from Texas A&M, Carnegie Mellon, Imperial College London, and the Georgetown University School of Foreign Service.

Moza was also recognized as one of the 100 Influential Celebrities in Oncology by OncoDaily.

== Children ==
The royal couple has five sons and two daughters:

- Sheikh Jassim bin Hamad bin Khalifa Al Thani (born 1978) – heir apparent of Qatar until 2003.
- Sheikh Tamim bin Hamad Al Thani, Prince of Qatar (born 1980) – heir apparent of Qatar (2003–2013), current Emir of Qatar.
- Sheikha Al-Mayassa bint Hamad bin Khalifa Al Thani (born 1983).
- Sheikha Hind bint Hamad bin Khalifa Al Thani (born 1984) – director of the Emir's Office since 2009.
- Sheikh Joaan bin Hamad bin Khalifa Al Thani (born 1986).
- Sheikh Mohammed bin Hamad bin Khalifa Al Thani (born 1988).
- Sheikh Khalifa bin Hamad bin Khalifa Al Thani (born 1991).
