= Joaan bin Hamad Al Thani =

President of the Olympic Council of Asia (born 1986)

Joaan bin Hamad bin Khalifa Al Thani
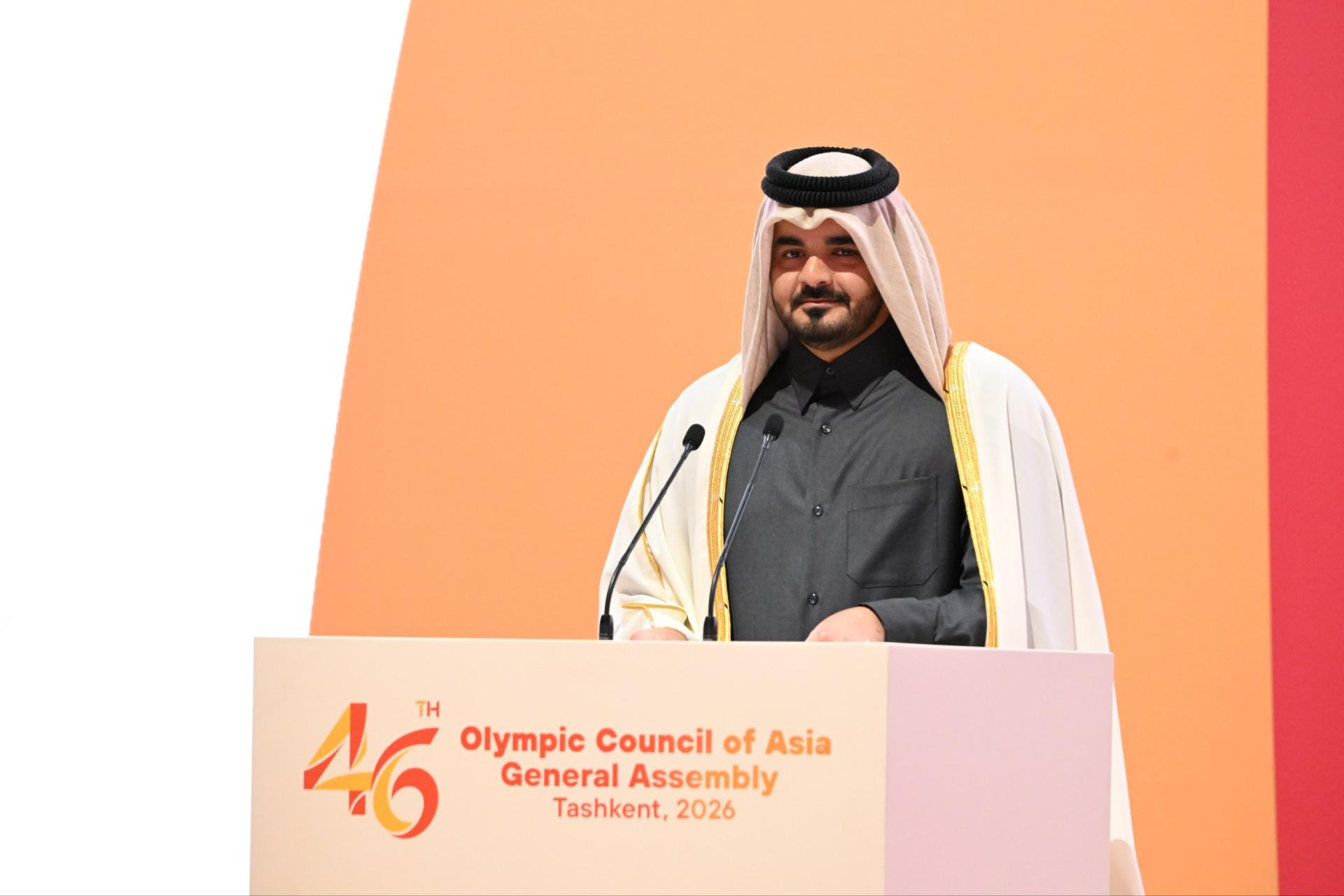
- Joaan bin Hamad bin Khalifa Al Thani in the 46th General Assembly of Asian Olympic Council

4th President of the Olympic Council of Asia
- Incumbent
- Assumed office 26 January 2026
- Preceded by: Randhir Singh
- Born: 23 July 1986 (age 39); Doha, Qatar
- Spouse: Al-Maha bint Salem Al-Rumul Al-Mannai (m. 2008)
- Issue: Hamad bin Joaan bin Hamad Al Thani; Tamim bin Joaan bin Hamad Al Thani; Al-Dhabi bint Joaan bin Hamad Al Thani; Khalifa bin Joaan bin Hamad Al Thani; Moza bint Joaan bin Hamad Al Thani; Jassim bin Joaan bin Hamad Al Thani; Maryam bint Joaan bin Hamad Al Thani; Mohammed bin Joaan bin Hamad Al Thani
- House: Thani
- Father: Hamad bin Khalifa Al Thani
- Mother: Moza bint Nasser Al-Missned

Joaan bin Hamad bin Khalifa Al Thani (Arabic: جوعان بن حمد بن خليفه آل ثاني; born 23 July 1986) is a senior member of the House of Thani. He is the fifth son of former emir of Qatar, Sheikh Hamad bin Khalifa Al Thani, his third child with his second wife, Sheikha Moza bint Nasser Al-Missned. He is thus brother of the current emir Tamim bin Hamad Al Thani. He is president of the Olympic Council of Asia and the Qatar Olympic Committee.

== Education and career ==
Sheikh Joaan Bin Hamad was educated at École spéciale militaire de Saint-Cyr, France. He also attended Oak Ridge Military Academy in Oak Ridge, North Carolina. He was the torch relay ambassador on the 2006 Asian Games in Doha.

In May 2015, he was appointed president of the Qatar Olympic Committee.

In addition to his other roles, he is a Board Member of the Supreme Committee for Delivery and Legacy for the FIFA World Cup Qatar 2022 (2018) and President of the 2023 FINA World Championships Organising Committee and the 2023 FINA World Masters Championships Organising Committee (2018).

He has been involved in the successful organization of several international events in Qatar. He was the President of the ANOC World Beach Games Qatar 2019 Organizing Committee, the President of the IAAF World Athletics Championships Organizing Committee, and the President of the FIG Artistic Gymnastics World Championships Organizing Committee.

Sheikh Joaan was the President of the 2012 Asian Handball Championships Organising Committee and was an Ambassador of the Doha 2006 Asian Games Torch Relay.

He is the Chairman of Al-Shaqab Racing (2011–present). He additionally held the position of Vice President at Al-Sadd Sports Club from 2012 to 2015.

He is a member of the Public Affairs and Social Development through Sport Commission (2018) within the International Olympic Committee (IOC). Additionally, he was a board member of the IOC-Olympic Refuge Foundation (2017–2018).

Sheikh Joaan has received the Contribution to the Olympic Movement (2019) award from the Association of National Olympic Committees (ANOC) as well as the Corporate Social Responsibility Person of the Year award (2015) from Qatar University. He was president of the Organising Committee of the 24th Men's Handball World Championship Qatar 2015. Sheikh Joaan bin Hamad is chairman of the Doha 2030 Asian Games Bid Committee which won the bid for the 2030 Asian Games.

In 2020, he received a master's degree in Business Administration from HEC Paris in Qatar.

On 9 August 2022, Sheikh Joaan attended the opening ceremony of the 5th edition of the 2021 Islamic Solidarity Games, which was opened by Turkish president Recep Tayyip Erdoğan in Konya, Turkey. In December 2024 it was reported that he was re-elected as President of the Qatar Olympic Committee (QOC) for the 2024–2028 Olympic term.

On 26 January 2026. Sheikh Joaan was elected as President of the Olympic Council of Asia (OCA), succeeding Randhir Singh.

== Marriage and children ==
Sheikh Joaan married at Al-Wajbah Palace, Doha, on 24 April 2008, with Sheikha Al-Maha bint Salem Al-Rumul Al-Mannai, daughter of Salem Al-Rumul Al-Mannai. Together they have five sons and three daughters.

- Sheikh Hamad bin Joaan bin Hamad Al Thani, (born 20 November 2009)
- Sheikh Tamim bin Joaan bin Hamad Al Thani, (born 21 September 2010)
- Sheikha Al-Dhabi bint Joaan bin Hamad Al Thani, (born 25 April 2012)
- Sheikh Khalifa bin Joaan bin Hamad Al Thani, (born 3 March 2014)
- Sheikha Moza bint Joaan bin Hamad Al Thani, (born 2 November 2015)
- Sheikh Jassim bin Joaan bin Hamad Al Thani, (born 7 March 2018)
- Sheikha Maryam bint Joaan bin Hamad Al Thani, (born 28 January 2020)
- Sheikh Mohammed bin Joaan bin Hamad Al Thani, (born March 2025)

Preceded by Randhir Singh	President of the OCA; 2026–present	Succeeded by Incumbent
