= Hamad bin Khalifa Al Thani =

Emir of Qatar from 1995 to 2013

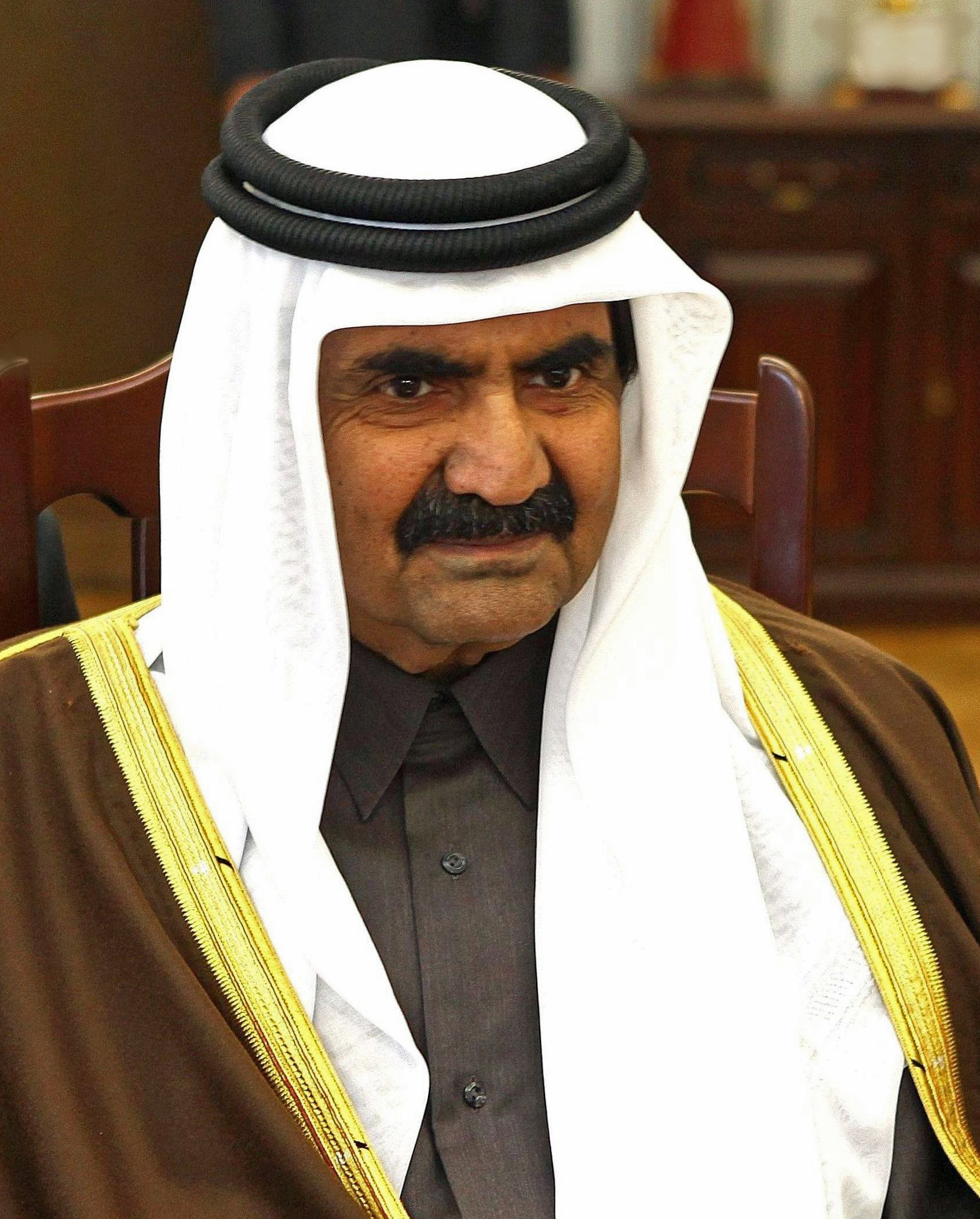
- Hamad in 2011

Emir of Qatar
- Reign: 27 June 1995 – 25 June 2013
- Predecessor: Khalifa bin Hamad Al Thani
- Successor: Tamim bin Hamad Al Thani
- Prime Minister: Himself; Abdullah bin Khalifa; Hamad bin Jassim
- Heirs apparent: Mishaal bin Hamad Al Thani; Jassim bin Hamad Al Thani; Tamim bin Hamad Al Thani
- Born: 1 January 1952; Doha, Qatar
- Died: 12 July 2026 (aged 74); Doha, Qatar
- Burial: Lusail Royal Cemetery, Lusail
- Spouse: Mariam bint Muhammad Al Thani; Moza bint Nasser Al-Missned; Noora bint Khalid Al Thani
- Issue: Detail
Names
- Hamad bin Khalifa bin Hamad bin Abdullah bin Jassim bin Mohammed Al Thani
- House: Thani
- Father: Khalifa bin Hamad Al Thani
- Mother: Aisha bint Hamad Al Attiyah
- Military career
- Education: Royal Military Academy Sandhurst
- Allegiance: Qatar
- Branch: Qatar Armed Forces
- Service years: 1971–2013
- Rank: General

Hamad bin Khalifa Al Thani (Arabic: حمد بن خليفة آل ثاني; 1 January 1952 – 12 July 2026) was Emir of Qatar from 1995 until his abdication in 2013. He was also prime minister of Qatar from 1995 to 1996.

Hamad received his education in Qatar before attending the United Kingdom's Royal Military Academy Sandhurst. After graduating in 1971, he held several senior posts in the Qatar Armed Forces, including as chief of staff and minister of defense. Hamad seized power from his father, Khalifa bin Hamad Al Thani, in a bloodless palace coup d'état in 1995. During his 18-year rule, he promoted the development of Qatar's natural gas, in particular liquefied natural gas (LNG), which reached 77 million tonnes in annual production. This made Qatar the richest country in the world per capita with the average income in the country being US$86,440 a year per person. As emir of Qatar, Hamad ruled the country as an absolute monarch, with supreme authority over all branches of state power, and no political parties were allowed.

During his reign, several sports and diplomatic events took place in Qatar, including the 2006 Asian Games, 2011 AFC Asian Cup, 2012 UN Climate Change Conference, Doha Agreement, Fatah–Hamas Doha Agreement, and the decision to hold the 2022 FIFA World Cup in the country. He established the Qatar Investment Authority. By 2013, it had invested over $100 billion around the world, including The Shard, Barclays Bank, Heathrow Airport, Harrods, Paris Saint-Germain F.C., Volkswagen, Siemens, and Royal Dutch Shell. Hamad's investment strategy is credited with Qatar becoming the first Arab and Muslim country to host the FIFA World Cup. Qatar began hosting two U.S. military bases while also maintaining relations with Iran. Hamad sought closer ties with both Iran and Israel compared to his father's approach. Hamad founded news media group Al Jazeera in 1996, which became known as the first news channel in the Arab world to provide critical coverage of Arab governments, though it has avoided criticizing Qatar's own government. He also played a part in negotiations between the U.S. and the Taliban.

In June 2013, Hamad, in a brief televised address, announced that he would hand power to his fourth son, Tamim bin Hamad Al Thani, who was born to his second wife, Moza bint Nasser. Following his abdication, he became known as the Father Emir in Qatari terminology. He is credited with setting the foundation of the modern Qatari state, including the adoption of its first permanent constitution and holding elections for the advisory Central Municipal Council; for presiding over a massive expansion in state revenue and national wealth due to LNG exports; and for his sweeping economic, cultural, and social reforms; which contributed to Qatar's rise on the international stage.

== Early life, education, and career ==
Hamad was born in Doha, Qatar on 1 January 1952. His mother died soon after his birth and he was raised by his uncle. He received his early education in Qatar.

He graduated from the British Royal Military Academy at Sandhurst in 1971, and was then commissioned as a lieutenant colonel in Qatar's armed forces. A few months later he returned to Qatar and was made commander of a mobile brigade, which later became a force called "Hamad Brigade". In 1972, Hamad had the rank of general, and became army chief of staff. Next he was appointed commander-in-chief of Qatar's armed forces with the rank of major general. In 1977 he was named minister of defense. He was eventually promoted to the ranks of lieutenant general and full general. His tenure as minister of defense coincided with the Gulf War, and Hamad met United States defense secretary Dick Cheney in 1991, during discussions about the postwar security architecture for the Arab states of the Persian Gulf. Hamad also promoted Qatar's participation in international sports, founded the Qatar Open tennis tournament, and led the Supreme Council for Youth Welfare from 1979 to 1991.

Hamad was appointed Heir Apparent of Qatar in 1977. In the early 1980s, he led the Supreme Planning Council, which sets Qatar's basic economic and social policies. Starting in 1992, Hamad's father began gradually handing over responsibility for the day-to-day running of the country, including the development of Qatar's oil and natural gas resources, rendering him the effective ruler of the country. However, his father ultimately retained control over state finances. Hamad came to be regarded as the de facto leader of the country, while his father's role as emir was considered a formality. He began to change Qatar's foreign policy from other Gulf Arab states by increasing contact and trade with Israel, calling for the lifting of international sanctions against Iraq, and improving relations with Iran. Qatar became the first Gulf monarchy to re-establish relations with Iraq after the Gulf War. Hamad met Iranian foreign minister Ali Akbar Velayati in 1994, who described Iran's relations with Qatar as "fraternal and good". Hamad also maintained cooperation with the United States, which included the building of a military base in Qatar, despite its criticisms of Qatar's increasing ties with Iraq and Iran.

== Reign (1995–2013) ==
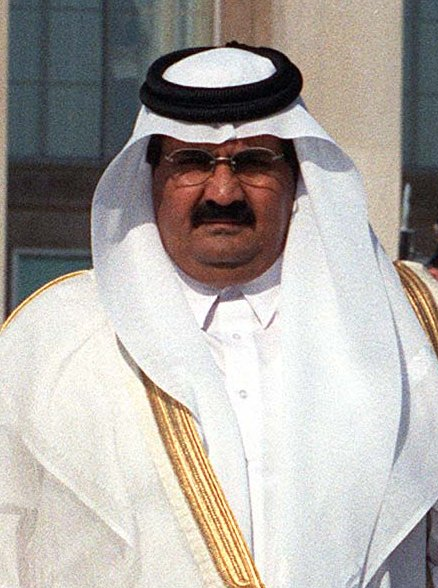
Sheikh Hamad in 1997

After securing the support of most senior members of his family, as well as that of the United States, Hamad staged a bloodless coup d'état on 27 June 1995 when his father Khalifa bin Hamad Al Thani was on vacation in Geneva, Switzerland, at which point he officially became the Emir of Qatar. The deposition came after a falling out between Hamad and his father, who had tried regaining some of the authority that he gave to Hamad starting in 1992. Thereafter, his father lived in exile in France and Abu Dhabi until he returned to Qatar in 2004. On 11 July 1995, Hamad announced his first cabinet, which included himself concurrently serving as prime minister, minister of defense, and commander-in-chief of the armed forces. He remained as prime minister until 29 October 1996, when he named his half-brother Abdullah bin Khalifa Al Thani to the post and asked him to form a government.

Hamad then engaged an American law firm to freeze his father's bank accounts abroad in order to deter a possible countercoup. However, a counter-coup was attempted against Hamad in February 1996 under the leadership of former Economy Minister Hamad bin Jassim bin Hamad Al Thani. The coup failed, and several of Qatar's traditional Arab allies were implicated in the plot, namely Saudi Arabia, the United Arab Emirates, Bahrain and Egypt.

In a break with traditional role, his second wife Sheikha Moza bint Nasser Al-Missned became a visible advocate for education and children's causes. In 1995, the couple founded the Qatar Foundation.

=== Autocracy and political reform ===
During Hamad's reign, the country enacted its first permanent constitution, following the 2003 Qatari constitutional referendum. While Hamad "hailed the event as a great step toward bringing democracy to the country", the constitution actually gave the emir "near-absolute powers", and in practice Hamad ruled an autocratic regime in Qatar. In 1999, Qatar held elections for the first time, to the advisory Central Municipal Council, in which women were also allowed to vote and stand as candidates. This made Qatar the first Gulf country to allow women to vote.

Mehran Kamrava of Georgetown University in Qatar has suggested that Qatar's highly publicized campaign of political liberalization was meant to help stabilize the regime under Hamad, especially through support from the West, and that once sufficient stabilization was achieved, "both the rhetoric and the pretext of democratization were abandoned". Other scholars have also called Hamad's domestic political reforms "largely performative" steps, intended mostly to bolster Qatar's international image without enacting meaningful change, or said that Qatar's "political trajectory reflects a model of selective and symbolic democratization—embracing electoral forms while avoiding their full democratic substance." Although the ministry of information was abolished in 1998, with the press occasionally allowed to criticize the economy or the status of foreign workers, journalists continue to face a "draconian system of censorship". It has been noted in scholarship that the Qatari government "made great play" of the abolition of the Ministry of Information promising greater press freedom, and that in reality the step was a "highly symbolic gesture" intended to signal reform to international partners while attempting to "carefully, selectively, and pre-emptively remain in control of content".

=== Oil and gas wealth ===
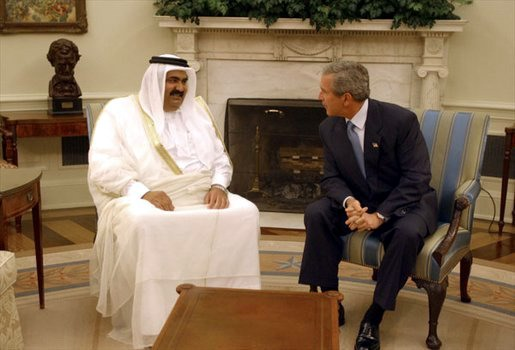
US president George W. Bush and Hamad bin Khalifa in the Oval Office, 2003

Hamad was able to focus on turning Qatar from a small desert backwater into a major world power by continuing to exploit the country's vast oil fields and discovering and tapping the world's third largest gas reserves. By 2010 liquefied natural gas (LNG) production had reached 77 million tons, making Qatar the richest country in the world. With fewer than two million inhabitants, the average income in the country shot to $86,440 per year per person. Qatar expert Olivier Da Lage said: "When he came to power in 1995, Sheikh Hamad had a goal to place Qatar on the world map by exploiting the gas resources which his father did not develop for fear it would change the emirate's society. Eighteen years on, he has finished the job – Qatar has acquired the financial clout to command respect from neighboring countries and Western governments alike".

Since he had been the crown prince, Hamad promoted the development of natural gas, and in particular the North Field, the largest gas field in the world, as an alternative to Qatar's dependence on crude oil exports. State revenue began growing massively when the North Field started exporting LNG in 1996; its value added increased from US$3 billion to $110 billion over the course of his reign. By 2006 Qatar had become the world's largest LNG exporter. During Hamad's reign, Qatar's GDP increased by 24 times, and per capita GDP increased by nearly six times. Hamad also adopted the Qatar National Vision 2030 plan, aiming to transform Qatar into a knowledge-based economy.

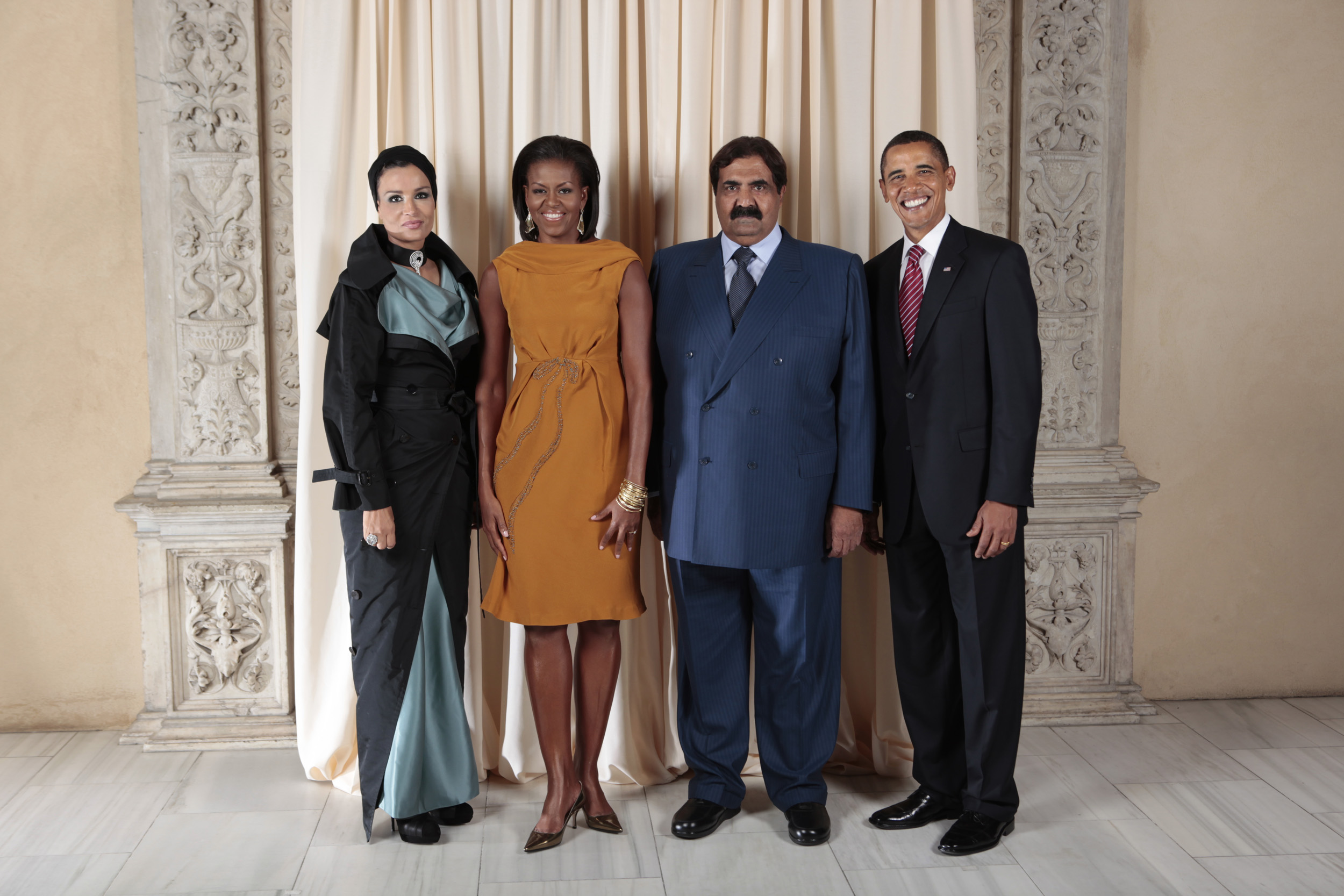
Sheikh Hamad and his wife Moza bint Nasser with US president Barack Obama and his wife Michelle, 2009

In 2005, under the direction of Hamad and Sheikh Hamad bin Jassim bin Jaber Al Thani, the Qatar Investment Authority was established, a sovereign wealth fund to manage the country's oil and natural gas surpluses. The Qatar Investment Authority and its subsidiaries have acquired many businesses abroad, including London's iconic department store Harrods from entrepreneur Mohamed Al-Fayed, Paris-based department store Printemps, French football club Paris Saint-Germain F.C., a former 10% stake in Porsche, a 75% stake in film studio Miramax Films which they acquired from Disney, a 2% stake in media conglomerate and Universal Music Group parent company Vivendi, a US$100 million investment in Chernin Group – whose founder Peter Chernin was COO of News Corp and President of Fox, a 1% stake in luxury goods manufacturer Louis Vuitton Moët Hennessy, a 6% stake in Credit Suisse, a 12.6% stake in Barclays and several other major companies. They also backed Glencore's $31 billion takeover bid for Xstrata. Qatar became the largest property owner in London with their holdings including the United Kingdom's tallest building The Shard, the London Olympic Village and the InterContinental London Park Lane hotel. They also own several hotels in Cannes including the Majestic Hotel, Grand Hyatt Cannes Hôtel Martinez and the Carlton Hotel, Cannes. QIA was considered to have one of the leading bids in the sales of both Anschutz Entertainment Group and Hulu. As of May 2013, it was reported the Investment Authority was in talks to purchase Neiman Marcus and Bergdorf Goodman.

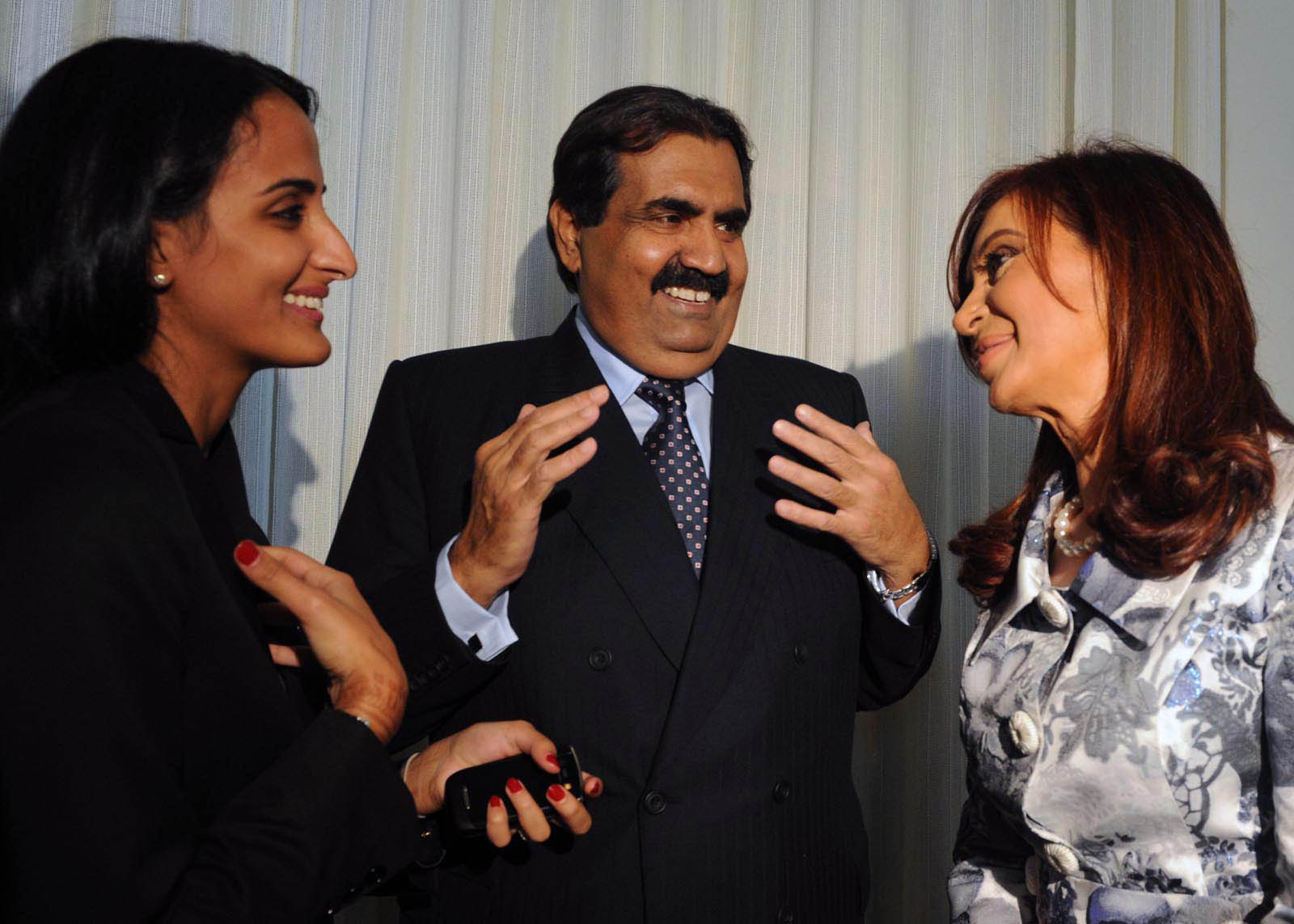
Hamad with Argentine president Cristina Fernández de Kirchner, September 2010

Media sources claimed that Hamad made a bid for Manchester United on 11 February 2011. Qatari Holdings offered £1.65 billion to Malcolm Glazer, the American owner of the club. This follows a series of endeavors by the Emir and other Qataris into the global football community, following Qatar's successful bid for the 2022 World Cup, and the Qatar Foundation's recent £125m shirt deal with FC Barcelona. In mid-June 2011, rumours resurfaced that Qatari Holdings were preparing a £2 Billion takeover bid and that the funding, that the club had been using for transfers since the start of June, was actually supplied by the Qataris and not the Glazer Family. In 2012 it was rumoured that Hamad was in bid for Rangers F.C. On 30 March 2012 Hamad offered to buy KF Tirana, although the details have yet to be published.

=== Foreign relations ===
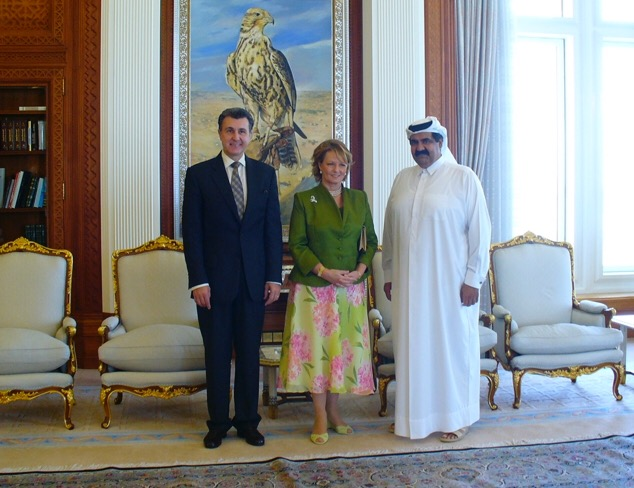
Sheikh Hamad with Margareta of Romania and her husband Prince Radu, 2010

The foreign policy of Qatar was primarily determined by a circle of four; Hamad, his wife Moza bint Nasser, crown prince Tamim bin Hamad Al Thani, and prime minister and foreign minister Hamad bin Jassim bin Jaber Al Thani. Despite this, the Norwegian Centre for Conflict Resolution claimed that Hamad was fully in charge of every foreign policy decision.

Due to Qatar's historically tenuous relationship with regional powers such as Iran and Saudi Arabia, Hamad sought to court the United States as a counterweight to any potential threats. In the aftermath of the September 11 attacks, United States Central Command established their regional headquarters in Doha's Al Udeid Air Base.

The Emir made a $100 million donation for the relief of New Orleans following Hurricane Katrina in 2005. He was a key person in the ceasefire during the 2006 Lebanon War and contributed significantly in the relief of damaged areas.

As emir, Hamad oversaw a tightening of ties with Iran, as opposed to other Arab Gulf neighbours. In 2010, Qatar and Iran signed a defense cooperation agreement and an internal security pact, and Hamad traveled to Tehran to meet with both the President of Iran, Mahmoud Ahmadinejad, and its supreme leader, Ali Khamenei, exchanging pledges of cooperation and friendship. In late 2012, Hamad paid $57 million in ransom to free 57 IRGC fighters captured by an armed opposition group in southern Damascus, and Ahmadinejad later told that the Emir refused to accept reimbursement from the Iranian government, stating that he paid the ransom "for the sake of the friendship between the two peoples".

In 2012, the Emir proposed deploying Arab troops to reduce killings in the Syrian civil war. He provided two military bases for foreign troops, Al Udeid Air Base and Camp As Sayliyah.

Despite the prevalence of anti-Israel sentiment within the Arab world, he had previously maintained friendly relations with Israel. He met Israeli foreign minister Tzipi Livni on 25 September 2007 in New York City. This marked the first real attempt by any leader in the Persian Gulf to pursue dialogue with Israel. However, Qatar severed diplomatic ties with Israel in 2009 in response to Israel's actions during the Gaza war. The emir also expressed his objection to Israeli settlement policy, especially the Judaization of Jerusalem.

==== Palestine ====
In October 2012, the Emir made a landmark visit to Gaza by being the first head of state to go there since the 2006 election of Hamas and the imposition of a blockade by Israel. He took a flight to Egypt before being driven into Gaza. Palestine's interior ministry was said to have a "well-prepared plan" to provide security for the emir during his stay. In October 2012, Hamad visited Gaza and pledged US$400 million in humanitarian aid to Hamas, to build infrastructure projects and hospitals.

In December 2012, The New York Times accused the Qatari government of funding the Al-Nusra Front, a U.S. government designated terrorist organization. Others have noted the Emir's visit to Gaza and meeting with Hamas, which houses a militant wing, Izz ad-Din al-Qassam Brigades. However, Qatar denies these allegations, stating that its policy was to help facilitate constructive engagement between Hamas and the Palestinian Authority.

In 2004, 2010, 2014, and 2017, the Qatari government introduced new anti-terror laws to combat terrorism, terrorism financing and related crimes. In 2019 the Qatari government introduced a new anti-money laundering and counter terror financing laws.

=== Culture and education ===
In one of his first acts as emir in 1995, Hamad established the Qatar Foundation for Education, Science and Community Development. In the arts, Hamad established the Qatar Museums Authority in 2005 which built the I. M. Pei designed Museum of Islamic Art Doha. Since its opening, Qatar has become the world's biggest contemporary art buyer, famously purchasing Cézanne's The Card Players in 2012 for over US$250 million. The art acquisition efforts were often represented by Sheikh Saud bin Mohammed Al Thani, president of Qatar's National Council for Culture, Arts and the Heritage.

Throughout his reign, Hamad played an active role in promoting sports and athletics in Qatar and significantly increasing its prominence on the international stage. Doha became a foremost sporting capital in the world, hosting several major international tournaments. He oversaw the development of advanced sporting infrastructure, as well the creation of a women's tennis league in 2003 and the National Sports Day in 2011. The "defining sporting achievement" of his reign was considered to have occurred in December 2010, when Qatar was awarded the right to host the 2022 FIFA World Cup.

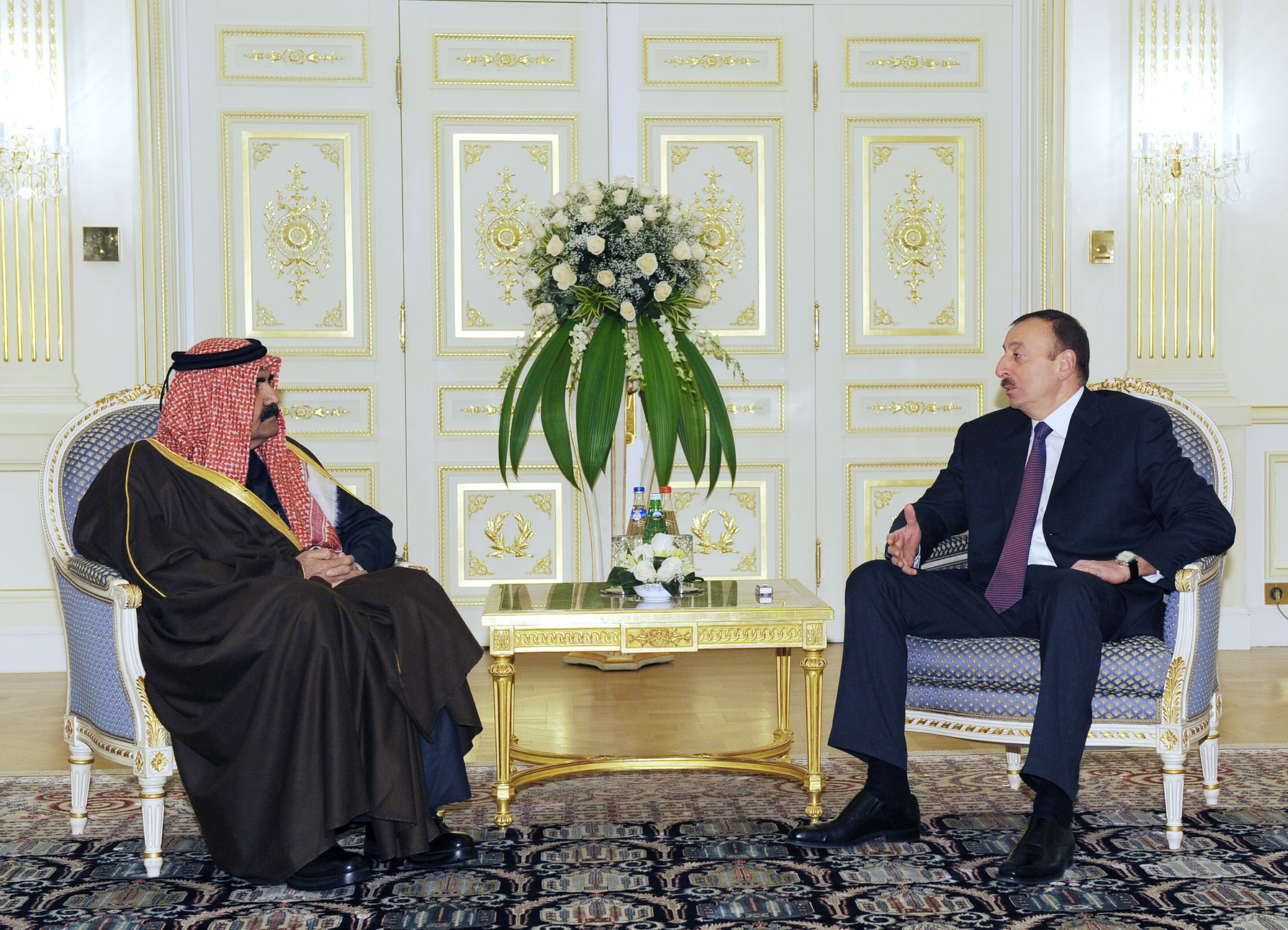
Sheikh Hamad with President of Azerbaijan Ilham Aliyev in 2012

The Museum Authority sponsored Takashi Murakami's EGO exhibit in Doha which ran from 9 February to 24 June 2012, Damien Hirst's retrospective at Tate Modern in Spring and Summer 2012 and Hirst's exhibition Relics, from October 2013 to January 2014. In July 2013, in conjunction with Miuccia Prada and the Prada Foundation, QMA launched CURATE, a global search for curatorial talent. Additionally, the Doha Film Institute was established in 2009 which in partnership with the Tribeca Film Festival (founded by Robert De Niro), created the Doha Tribeca Film Festival that ran from 2009 – 2012. The Doha Film Institute produced Salma Hayek's upcoming animated adaptation of Khalil Gibran's classic novel The Prophet, with Lion King director Roger Allers coordinating the process. DFI was also credited as a production company on several other films, including Just Like a Woman starring Sienna Miller, The Reluctant Fundamentalist, directed by Mira Nair, which opened the 69th Venice International Film Festival, and Kanye West's Cruel Summer – a short film which was shot in Doha and premiered during the 2012 Cannes Film Festival. In February 2013, they announced a $100 million feature film fund with Participant Media, a production company founded by billionaire Jeffrey Skoll, who was the first employee and also first president of internet auction firm eBay.

Under the patronage of Hamad and his wife Sheikha Moza Bint Nasser Al-Missned, various academic institutions have opened campuses in Doha, including Carnegie Mellon University, Georgetown University, Northwestern University, Texas A&M University and Weill Cornell Medical College.

=== Abdication ===
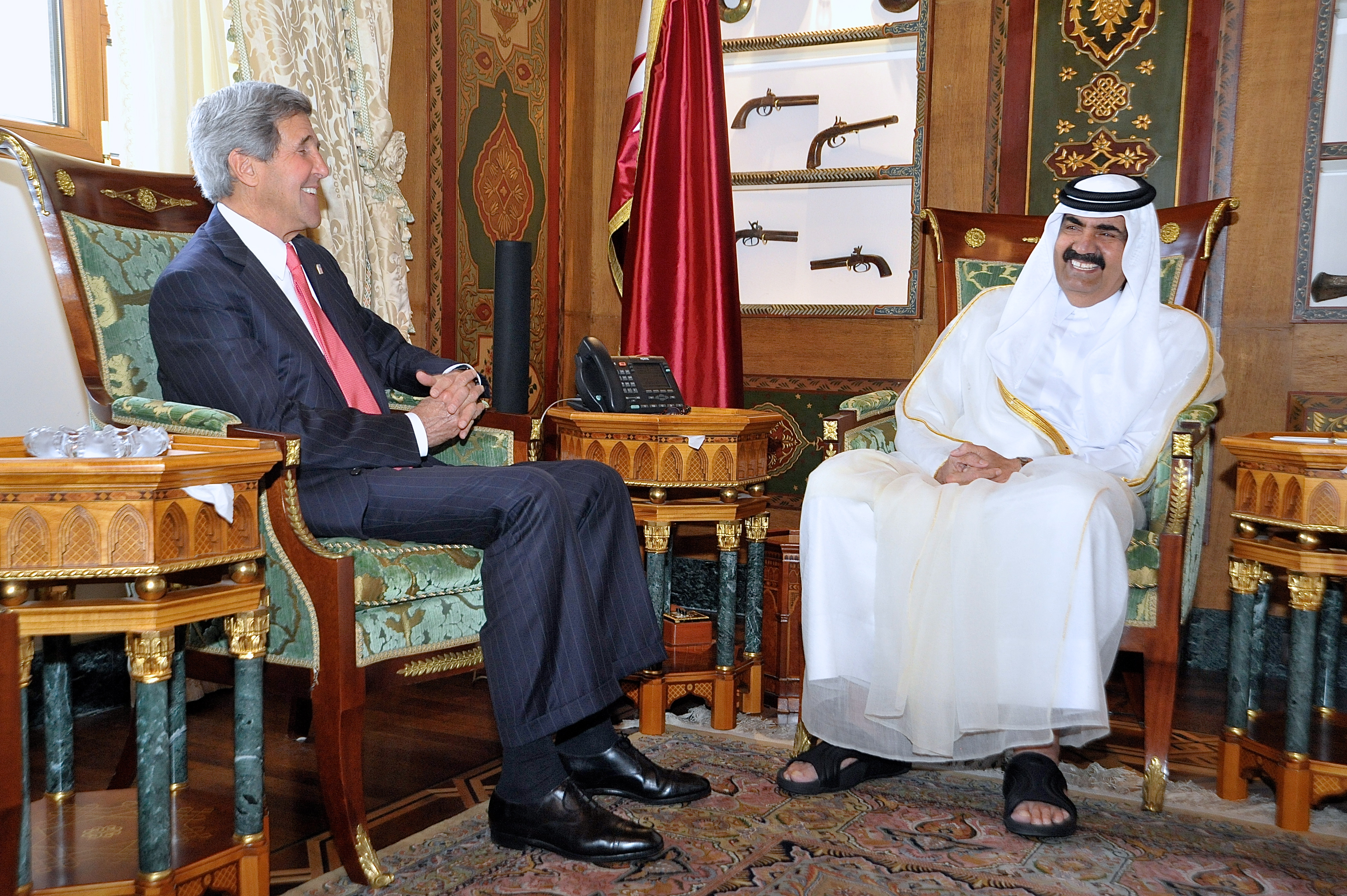
Sheikh Hamad with John Kerry in 2014

On 25 June 2013, Hamad handed over power to his son Tamim bin Hamad Al Thani in a televised speech. In regards to the shift in power, Hamad said: "The time has come to open a new page in the journey of our nation that would have a new generation carry the responsibilities".

== Health and death ==
Hamad was believed to have suffered from poor health for several years. Hamad underwent his first kidney transplant in 1997 and at least one more at a later date. He later went on dialysis.

In December 2015, he was flown to Zurich, Switzerland, for treatment after breaking his leg while on vacation in Morocco's Atlas Mountains.

Hamad died in Doha on 12 July 2026, at the age of 74. The Qatari government declared four days of national mourning with flags at half mast. The Indian government announced a day of national mourning. The Maldivian government announced flags to fly at half-mast for a day.

=== Funeral ===
Hamad's funeral was held on the same day of his death, after evening prayers, at the Imam Muhammad ibn Abd al-Wahhab Mosque in Doha. Heads of state such as President of Turkey Recep Tayyip Erdoğan, President of Syria Ahmed al-Sharaa and Prime Minister of Italy Giorgia Meloni came to pay their respects. Foreign minister of Iran, Abbas Araghchi, also came to pay his respects, even amidst harsh criticism from the GCC on Iran's ongoing attacks on neighbouring countries. Among other dignitaries present was also FIFA president Gianni Infantino, who notably left the United States just a day before the semi finals of the 2026 FIFA World Cup to attend the event. Hamad was said to have been "buried in a simple grave" at the Lusail Cemetery north of Doha.

== Legacy ==
Often called the "founding father of modern Qatar", Hamad is regarded as having laid the foundation of the modern Qatari state, and began efforts to increase Qatar's soft power, with major investments in education, scientific research, sports, and media. In their obituary of Hamad, The New York Times stated that under his reign, Hamad oversaw Qatar's transformation from a "little-known desert peninsula in the Persian Gulf" into a country with "vast wealth and global influence".

Following his abdication, he became known as the Father Emir in Qatari terminology. He is credited with his efforts in the adoption of Qatar's first permanent constitution, and holding elections to the advisory Central Municipal Council. He was also noted for presiding over a massive expansion in state revenue and national wealth from LNG exports, and for strengthening ties between Qatar and the Western world. Aside from politics and economic expansion, Hamad was also credited with making Qatar into a "global sporting hub" by increasing the country's involvement and performance in a number of international competitions. He was also noted for founding Al Jazeera, which The Los Angeles Times described as a "major force in global media" and a "powerful voice in Arab media".

== Investments ==
In 2013, Hamad established the Qatar Investment Authority, which has invested over $100 billion around the world, including The Shard, Barclays, Heathrow Airport, Harrods, Paris Saint-Germain F.C., Siemens and Royal Dutch Shell. It also holds about 17% stake in the Volkswagen Group, Porsche, Hochtief, as well as investments in Sainsbury's.

Hamad was listed as owner of Afrodille S.A., which had a bank account in Luxembourg and shares in two South African companies. He also held a majority of the shares in Rienne S.A. and Yalis S.A., which held a term deposit with the Bank of China in Luxembourg. A relative owned 25% of these: Sheikh Hamad bin Jassim Al Thani, Qatar's former prime minister and foreign minister.

== Marriages and children ==
Sheikh Hamad had three wives and 24 children, 11 sons and 13 daughters.

Hamad's first wife was his first cousin, Sheikha Mariam bint Muhammad Al Thani, the daughter of his paternal uncle, Sheikh Muhammad bin Hamad bin Abdullah Al Thani. They had two sons and six daughters:

- Sheikh Mishaal bin Hamad bin Khalifa Al Thani (born 1972) – heir apparent of Qatar (1995–1996)
- Sheikh Fahad bin Hamad bin Khalifa Al Thani
- Sheikha Aisha bint Hamad bin Khalifa Al Thani
- Sheikha Fatima bint Hamad bin Khalifa Al Thani
- Sheikha Rawdah bint Hamad bin Khalifa Al Thani
- Sheikha Hessa bint Hamad bin Khalifa Al Thani
- Sheikha Mashael bint Hamad bin Khalifa Al Thani
- Sheikha Sara bint Hamad bin Khalifa Al Thani – Program Coordinator for Reach Out to Asia-Qatar (ROTAQ)

Hamad's second wife was Sheikha Moza bint Nasser Al-Missned (born 8 August 1959 in Al Khor), the daughter of Nasser bin Abdullah Al-Missned. They had five sons and two daughters:

- Sheikh Jassim bin Hamad bin Khalifa Al Thani (born 25 August 1978) – heir apparent of Qatar (1996–2003)
- Sheikh Tamim bin Hamad bin Khalifa Al Thani (born 3 June 1980) – heir apparent of Qatar (2003–2013), current Emir of Qatar (2013–present)
- Sheikha Al-Mayassa bint Hamad bin Khalifa Al Thani (born 29 September 1983)
- Sheikha Hind bint Hamad bin Khalifa Al Thani (born 15 August 1984)
- Sheikh Joaan bin Hamad bin Khalifa Al Thani (born 1986)
- Sheikh Mohammed bin Hamad bin Khalifa Al Thani (born 18 April 1988)
- Sheikh Khalifa bin Hamad bin Khalifa Al Thani (born 11 November 1991)

Hamad's third wife was Sheikha Noora bint Khalid Al Thani, again his first cousin, the daughter of his paternal uncle, Sheikh Khalid bin Hamad Al Thani, who was the minister of the interior. They had four sons and five daughters:

- Sheikh Khalid bin Hamad bin Khalifa Al Thani (born 4 September 1986)
- Sheikh Abdullah bin Hamad bin Khalifa Al Thani (born 9 February 1988) – Deputy Emir of Qatar since 11 November 2014.
- Sheikh Thani bin Hamad bin Khalifa Al Thani (born 16 January 1994)
- Sheikh Al Qaqa bin Hamad bin Khalifa Al Thani (born 30 June 2000)
- Sheikha Luluwah bint Hamad bin Khalifa Al Thani
- Sheikha Maha bint Hamad bin Khalifa Al Thani
- Sheikha Dana bint Hamad bin Khalifa Al Thani
- Sheikha Al Anoud bint Hamad bin Khalifa Al Thani
- Sheikha Mariam bint Hamad bin Khalifa Al Thani

== Titles, styles, honours and awards ==
Styles of Sheikh Hamad bin Khalifa Al Thani
- Reference style: His Highness
- Spoken style: Your Highness

=== Titles ===
- 1 January 1952 – 22 February 1972: Sheikh Hamad bin Khalifa Al Thani
- 22 February 1972 – 1977: His Excellency Sheikh Hamad bin Khalifa Al Thani
- 1977 – 27 June 1995: His Highness Sheikh Hamad bin Khalifa Al Thani, Crown Prince of Qatar
- 27 June 1995 – 25 June 2013: His Highness Sheikh Hamad bin Khalifa Al Thani, Emir of the State of Qatar
- 25 June 2013 – 12 July 2026: His Highness Sheikh Hamad bin Khalifa Al Thani, Father Emir of Qatar

=== Honours ===
==== Foreign honours ====
- Albania:
  - Grand Cross of the Order of George Castriot Skanderbeg
  - Recipient of the National Flag Order
- Austria: Grand Star of the Decoration of Honour for Services to the Republic of Austria
- Bahrain: Collar of the Order of Sheikh Isa bin Salman Al Khalifa
- Croatia: Grand Cross of the Grand Order of King Tomislav
- Cuba: Member of the Order of José Martí
- Dominican Republic: Grand Cross Special Class of the Order of Merit of Duarte, Sánchez and Mella
- Egypt: Collar of the Order of the Nile
- Finland: Grand Cross with Collar of the Order of the White Rose
- France: Grand Cross of the National Order of the Legion of Honour
- Germany: Grand Cross Special Class of the Order of Merit of the Federal Republic of Germany
- Greece: Grand Cross of the Order of the Redeemer
- Indonesia: First Class of the Order of the Star of Mahaputera
- Italy: Knight Grand Cross with Collar of the Order of Merit of the Italian Republic
- Ivory Coast: Grand Cross with Collar of the Order of the Ivory Coast
- Jordan: Grand Cordon with Collar of the Order of Al-Hussein bin Ali
- Lebanon:
  - Extraordinary Grade of the Order of Merit
  - Grand Cordon of the National Order of the Cedar
- Malaysia: Honorary Recipient of the Order of the Crown of the Realm
- Malta: Honorary Companion of Honour with Collar of the National Order of Merit
- Morocco: Collar of the Order of Muhammad
- The Netherlands: Knight Grand Cross of Order of the Netherlands Lion
- North Macedonia: First Class of the Order 8-September
- Oman:
  - Member Special Class of the Order of Oman
  - Knight Grand Cross of the Order of Merit
- Pakistan: Recipient of the Nishan-e-Pakistan
- Peru: Grand Cross of the Order of the Sun of Peru (13 February 2013)
- Philippines: Grand Collar (Supremo) of the Order of Lakandula
- Portugal: Grand Collar of the Order of Prince Henry
- Romania: Collar of the Order of the Star of Romania
- Saudi Arabia: Collar of the Order of King Abdulaziz
- Senegal: Grand Cross of the National Order of the Lion
- Spain: Collar of the Order of Isabella the Catholic
- Thailand: Knight of the Order of the Rajamitrabhorn
- Tunisia: Grand Cordon of the Order of 7 November
- United Kingdom:
  - Honorary Knight Grand Cross of the Order of the Bath
  - Honorary Knight Grand Cross of the Order of St Michael and St George
- Venezuela:
  - Grand Cordon of the Order of the Liberator
  - Grand Cross of the Order of Francisco de Miranda
- Yemen: Grand Cross of the Order of the Republic

=== Awards ===
- Albania
  - Tirana: Honorary Citizen of the City of Tirana
- Monaco
  - International Association of Athletics Federations: Member of the Golden Order of Merit
- United States
  - Foreign Policy: Top 100 Global Thinker – "For filling the leadership vacuum in the Middle East."

== See also ==
- List of the richest royals

Hamad bin Khalifa Al Thani House of Thani Born: 1 January 1952 Died: 12 July 2026
Regnal titles
Preceded by Khalifa bin Hamad Al Thani	Emir of Qatar; 1995–2013	Succeeded by Tamim bin Hamad Al Thani
Political offices
Preceded by Khalifa bin Hamad Al Thani	Prime Minister of Qatar; 1995–1996	Succeeded by Abdullah bin Khalifa Al Thani
