= Muhammad bin Jabr Al Thani =

Muhammad bin Jabr bin Muhammed Al Thani (1916 – May 1983) was a member of the Qatari royal family. He was the son of Jabr bin Muhammed Al Thani and the grandson of Sheikh Mohammed bin Thani, the second Emir of Qatar.

Muhammad al Thani was Minister of Municipal Affairs from 1972 to 1983 under Emir Khalifa bin Hamad Al Thani, the grandson of his cousin.

He died in May 1983.

== Sons ==
Jabr bin Muhammad, Married, Eleven Sons

Hamad bin Muhammad, Married, Five Sons

Abdallah bin Muhammad, Married, Four Sons

Abdurahman bin Muhammad, Married, Three Sons

Abdulaziz bin Muhammad, Married, Three Sons

Nasser bin Muhammad, Married, Four Sons

Ahmed bin Muhammad

Fahad bin Muhammad, Married, Six Sons

Mansour bin Muhammad, Married, Three Sons

Hasan bin Muhammad, Married, Two Sons

Faisal bin Muhammad, Married, Five Sons

Khalid bin Muhammad, Married, Three Sons

Talal bin Muhammad, Married, Three Sons

Thamir bin Muhammad, Married, Two Sons

Nawaf bin Muhammad, Married, Three Sons
