= Abdulrahman bin Jassim Al Thani =

Abdulrahman bin Jassim bin Muhammed Al Thani (1871–1930) was the sixth son of Sheikh Jassim bin Mohammed Al Thani, the previous Emir and the founder of modern Qatar. In 1898 his father Jassim bin Mohammed Al Thani selected him to become the governor of the Al Wakrah area.

== Governorship of Al Wakrah ==
Sheikh Abdulrahman bin Jassim Al Thani was appointed as Mudir of Al Wakrah by the Ottomans in place of Yusuf Bey in 1903. This elicited protests by the British government, who refused the Ottoman's rights to appoint any administrative official in Qatar.

From December 1907, there were a series of disputes between governor Abdulrahman bin Jassim and the Al-Buainain tribe. The Al-Buainain tribe had objected to paying the annual boat tax, and in reprisal, he fined the tribe 10,000 Qatari riyals and expelled 6 of the tribe's leaders. As retribution, one of the tribe leader's sons attempted to shoot him. His attempt was foiled, and he was imprisoned; however he was later procured forgiveness and released in return for the payment of the tax.

== Sons ==
- Sheikh Saud
- Sheikh Mohammed
- Sheikh Khalid
- Sheikh Mubarak
- Sheikh Hassan
- Sheikh Ghanim
