= Khalifa bin Jassim Al Thani =

Sheikh Khalifa bin Jassim bin Muhammed bin Jassim bin Muhammed Al Thani (born 1959) is a Qatari royal and businessperson. He has been the chairman of the Federation of the GCC Chambers of Commerce and Industry since 2014.

He is the ninth son of Sheikh Jassim bin Muhammed bin Jassim Al Thani.

== Education ==
He received a bachelor's degree in political and economic sciences from University of Portland in the United States.

== Business life ==
After graduation he worked in the Amiri Diwan as Head of Political Affairs Department till 1987 when he was appointed Director General of the Ministry of Economy and Commerce till 1993.

Since 2006 he has been Chairman of the Qatar Chamber of Commerce & Industry. He became the chairman in 2014 of the Federation of the GCC Chambers of Commerce and Industry.
