= Khalid bin Hamad Al Thani =

Qatari royal

Khalid bin Hamad bin Khalifa Al Thani خالد بن حمد بن خليفة آل ثاني
- Born: 4 September 1986 (age 40); Doha, Qatar
- House: Thani
- Father: Hamad bin Khalifa Al Thani
- Mother: Noora bint Khalid Al Thani

Khalid bin Hamad bin Khalifa Al Thani (Arabic: خالد بن حمد بن خليفة آل ثاني; born 4 September 1986) is a member of the royal family of Qatar, the House of Thani. He is a half-brother of Emir Tamim bin Hamad Al Thani.

Sheikh Khalid is the owner of Al-Annabi Racing. He is a son of the former emir of Qatar, Hamad bin Khalifa Al Thani and his first cousin Sheikha Noora bint Khalid Al Thani. In 2009, he invested around $10 million in Al-Anabi Racing in an attempt to promote Qatar's national image in the drag racing scene.

== Legal Issues ==
In September 2015, Sheikh Khalid abruptly left the U.S. "after his yellow Ferrari was caught on camera racing through Beverly Hills," Los Angeles. Police were considering charging Sheikh Khalid with reckless driving and other offenses.

In July 2019, a lawsuit was filed against Sheikh Khalid, alleging that he attempted to enlist his American security staffer to murder two people and hold another American captive. In the fall of 2017, security guard Matthew Pittard alleges that Sheikh Khalid "solicited" him to murder a man and a woman whom he "viewed as threats to his social reputation and personal security." Sheikh Khalid also allegedly threatened Pittard at gunpoint and said "he would kill him, bury his body in the desert, and kill Pittard's family."

A U.S. federal lawsuit was filed in the commonwealth of Massachusetts in 2020 by former staffers of Al Thani accusing him of rape, assault, kidnapping, and murder of rivals. Among the crimes he was accused of was ordering the murder of the owner of the American Drag Racing League as well as beating his wife’s driver to death. In documents filed at a court in Boston, the Qatari royal was accused of exploiting and torturing migrant workers at his residence in Doha. One of the plaintiffs, Terry Hope, said he witnessed Sheikh Khalid beat an Indian national to death who was employed as his wife’s driver because the victim was late in picking her up after a shopping spree in Doha.
