= Jassim bin Hamad Al Thani (born 1978) =

Former heir apparent of Qatar

Jassim bin Hamad bin Khalifa Al Thani
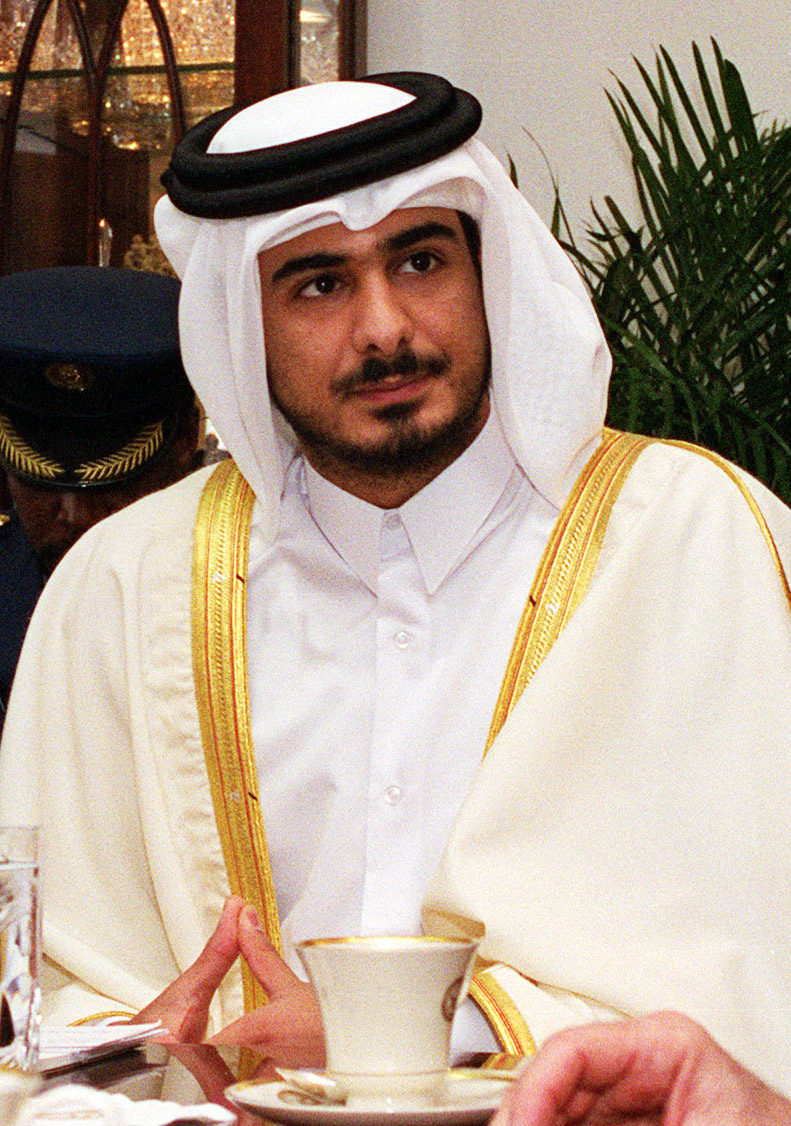
- Jassim bin Hamad Al Thani in 2000

Crown Prince of Qatar
- Term: 1995–2003
- Predecessor: Hamad bin Khalifa Al-Thani
- Successor: Tamim bin Hamad Al Thani
- Emir: Hamad bin Khalifa Al Thani
- Born: 25 August 1978 (age 47); Doha
- Spouse: Buthaina bint Hamad Al Thani (m. 2006)
- Issue: Moza bint Jassim bin Hamad Al Thani; Fahad bin Jassim bin Hamad Al Thani; Hind bint Jassim bin Hamad Al Thani; Hamad bin Jassim bin Hamad Al Thani; Tamim bin Jassim bin Hamad Al Thani; Al-Mayassa bint Jassim bin Hamad Al Thani; Dhai bint Jassim bin Hamad Al Thani; Ghand bint Jassim bin Hamad Al Thani
- House: Thani
- Father: Hamad bin Khalifa Al Thani
- Mother: Moza bint Nasser Al-Missned

Jassim bin Hamad bin Khalifa Al Thani (Arabic: جاسم بن حمد بن خليفة آل ثاني; born 25 August 1978) is the former heir apparent of Qatar. He is the third son of the former emir of Qatar, Sheikh Hamad bin Khalifa Al Thani, and the first child of the Emir with his second wife, Sheikha Moza bint Nasser Al-Missned. He renounced his position as crown prince in 2003 in favour of his younger brother Tamim, citing his own disinterest in becoming Emir.

== Early life and education ==
Sheikh Jassim is the third son of the former emir of Qatar, Hamad bin Khalifa Al Thani. His mother is Moza bint Nasser Al-Missned, the second wife of his father.

Jassim attended Milton Abbey School, an independent boarding school in the village of Milton Abbas, near the market town of Blandford Forum in Dorset, Southwest England. He later finished at the Royal Military Academy Sandhurst.

== Career ==
After graduation, Sheikh Jassim was commissioned as second lieutenant in the Qatar Armed Forces on 9 August 1996. He was then appointed heir apparent of Qatar on 23 October 1996, replacing his older half-brother Mishaal bin Hamad Al Thani. Jassim later renounced his rights to succession in favour of his younger brother, Sheikh Tamim, on 5 August 2003. According to state-run Qatar News Agency, Jassim sent a letter to his father saying, "The time is appropriate to step down and prepare for a successor". He added in the same document, "I did not want, as I have told you from the start, to be appointed as crown prince", and noted he had only accepted the position due to "sensitive circumstances".

Jassim was a personal representative of the former emir, and has been Honorary President of the Qatar National Cancer Society (QNCS) since 1997. Furthermore, he has been chair of the High Committee for Coordination and Follow-up since 1999, and Chairperson of the Supreme Council for the Environment and Natural Resources since 2000. He is also a patron of Aspire Academy since 2003, and on the Board of Trustees of Qatar Foundation.
