= Jassim bin Muhammed bin Jassim Al Thani =

Jassim bin Muhammed Al Thani
- Born: 1914; Umm Salal Mohammed
- Died: 1989 (aged 74–75); London, England
- House: Thani
- Father: Mohammed bin Jassim Al Thani
- Mother: Aisha bint Ahmed Al Thani
- Religion: Sunni Islam

Jassim bin Muhammed Al Thani (arabic جاسم بن محمد بن جاسم آل ثاني) was a member of the Qatari royal family who was the founder and minister of electricity and water from 1970 to 1989. He was born in 1914 in Umm Salal, and was the eldest son of Sheikh Mohammed bin Jassim Al Thani and Sheikha Aisha bint Ahmed Al Thani. He married six times as he was a royal. He died in 1989 in London, England at the age of 75.
