= Islam in Qatar =

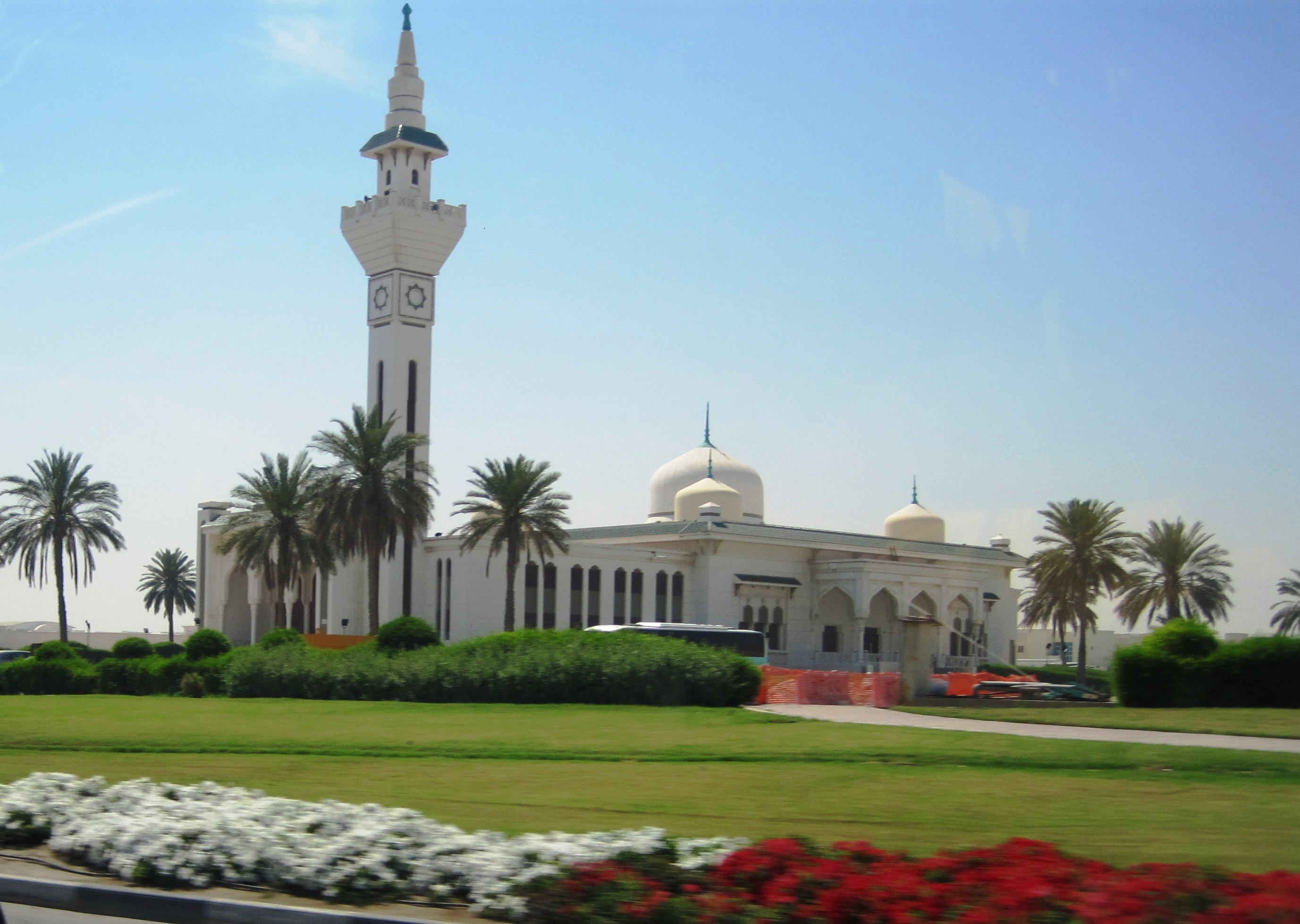
Hamza Mosque in Al Wakrah.

Qatar is a Muslim-majority country with Islam as the state religion. The Salafi movement, in its Hanbali version of Islam, is dominant in Qatar, making it one of the two Hanbali majority states in the Muslim world, along with Saudi Arabia. However, there is a large Shafi'i population, with the country's most renowned Islamic scholar Ali al-Qaradaghi belonging to the Shafi'i school. Most South Asian Muslims in Qatar practice the Hanafi school of Sunni Islam.

The local population is mainly Muslim, but the massive population of migrant workers, far outnumbering the locals, comes from a variety of backgrounds. In 2010, 67.8% of the population was Muslim, 13.8% Christian, 13.8% Hindu and 3.1% Buddhist. At the end of 2013, there were a total of 1,848 mosques operating in the country. By 2024, the number was over 2,000.

== History ==
Islam spread over the Arabian region in the 7th century in a string of widespread conflicts resulting in the Islamization of the native Arabian pagans. Muhammad sent his first military envoy, Al-Ala'a Al-Hadrami, to Munzir ibn Sawa Al Tamimi, the ruler of the region of Bahrain, which extended from the coast of Kuwait to the south of Qatar, in the year 628 AD to engage in da'wah and spread the teachings of Islam. Munzir subsequently converted to Islam as did many of his subjects.

Not all converted to Islam at this time. Isaac of Nineveh, a 7th-century Syriac Christian bishop regarded as a saint, was born in Qatar (then part of the province of Beth Qatraye). Other notable Christian scholars dating to this period include Dadisho Qatraya, Gabriel of Qatar and Ahob of Qatar. By the end of the 7th century, however, most of the Christians in Qatar had converted to Islam or migrated elsewhere. In the early years, Qatar's inhabitants subscribed to the radical Khawarij ideology. During the Second Fitna, a Khariji commander named Qatari ibn al-Fuja'a, described as the most popular and powerful Khariji leader, led the Azariqa, a sub-sect of the Khawarij, in to numerous battles. He held the title of Amir al-Mu'minin and ruled over the radical Azariqa movement for more than 12 years. Born in Al Khuwayr in Qatar, he also minted the first known Kharjite coins, the earliest of which dated to 688 or 689. The historic flag flown by Qatar was plain red, in correspondence with the red banner traditionally used by the Kharjite Muslims.

== Islam in education ==
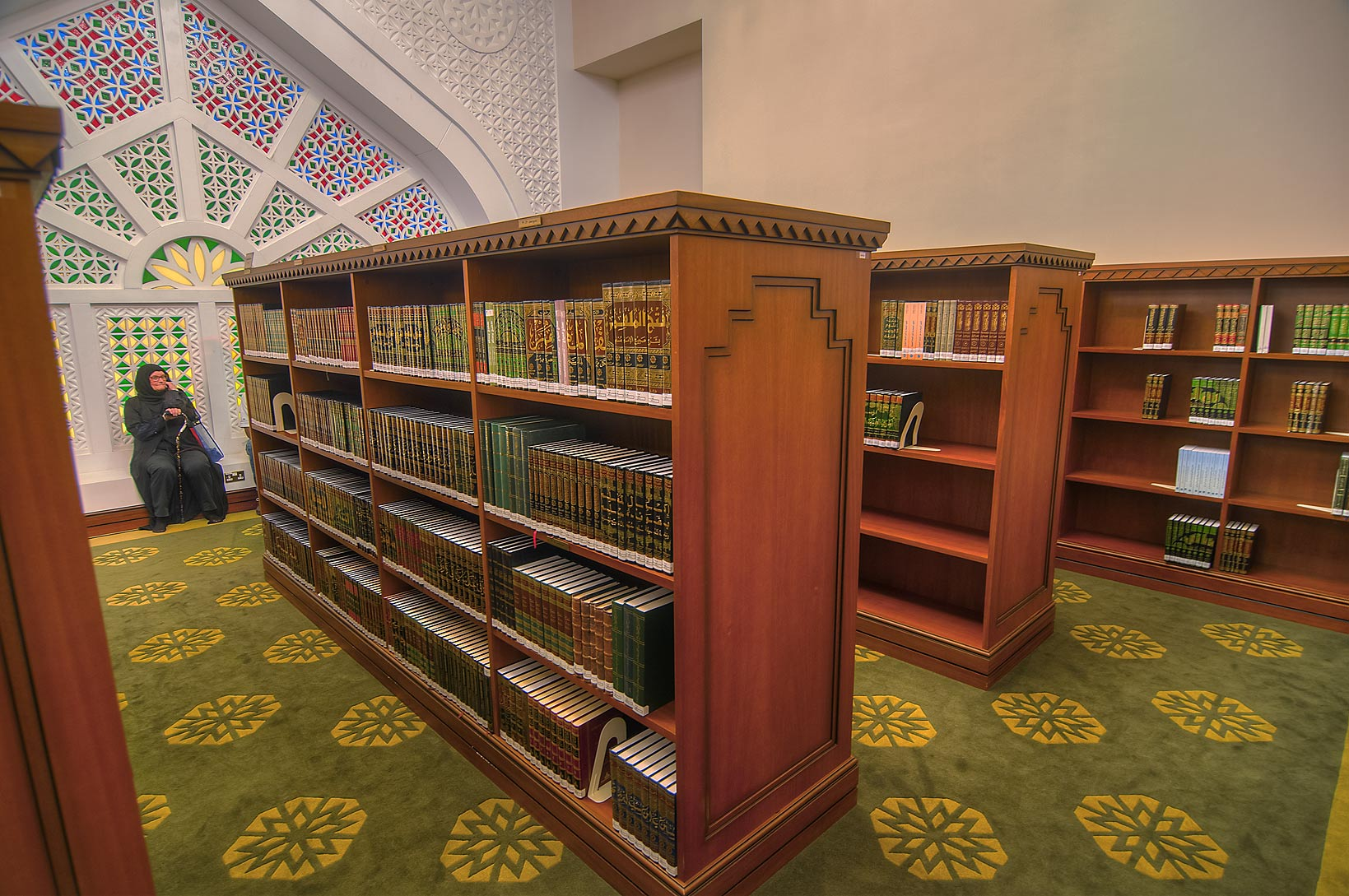
Library in Imam Muhammad ibn Abd al-Wahhab Mosque (Qatar State Mosque), Doha

Islamic Studies is taught at Qatar University, and at Hamad Bin Khalifa University's (HBKU) Faculty of Islamic Studies where a master's degree is offered.

Education City is also home to the Center for Islamic Legislation and Ethics [CILE], a think tank founded in 2012 and headed by Swiss political philosopher Professor Tariq Ramadan, of Oxford University.

Islam's role in scientific discovery has led to the establishment of the Society for Muslim Scientists and a joint venture of the Bloomsbury Publishing and Qatar Foundation to publish a book on the subject, Science in Islam.

The Fanar, Qatar Islamic Cultural Center is an outreach center for Islam that engages in social, religious and educational activities. In addition to housing some of the largest mosques in Qatar, the center publishes religious studies and offers courses in Arabic and Islam. Among Fanar's facilities is a library with Islamic literature and manuscripts.

Islamic studies is a core class that all Qatari and Muslim citizens must take in most schools in Qatar. For example, one of many schools is Hamilton International School, who mention on their official website that "It is compulsory for all Muslim students to study Islamic Studies".

== Demography ==
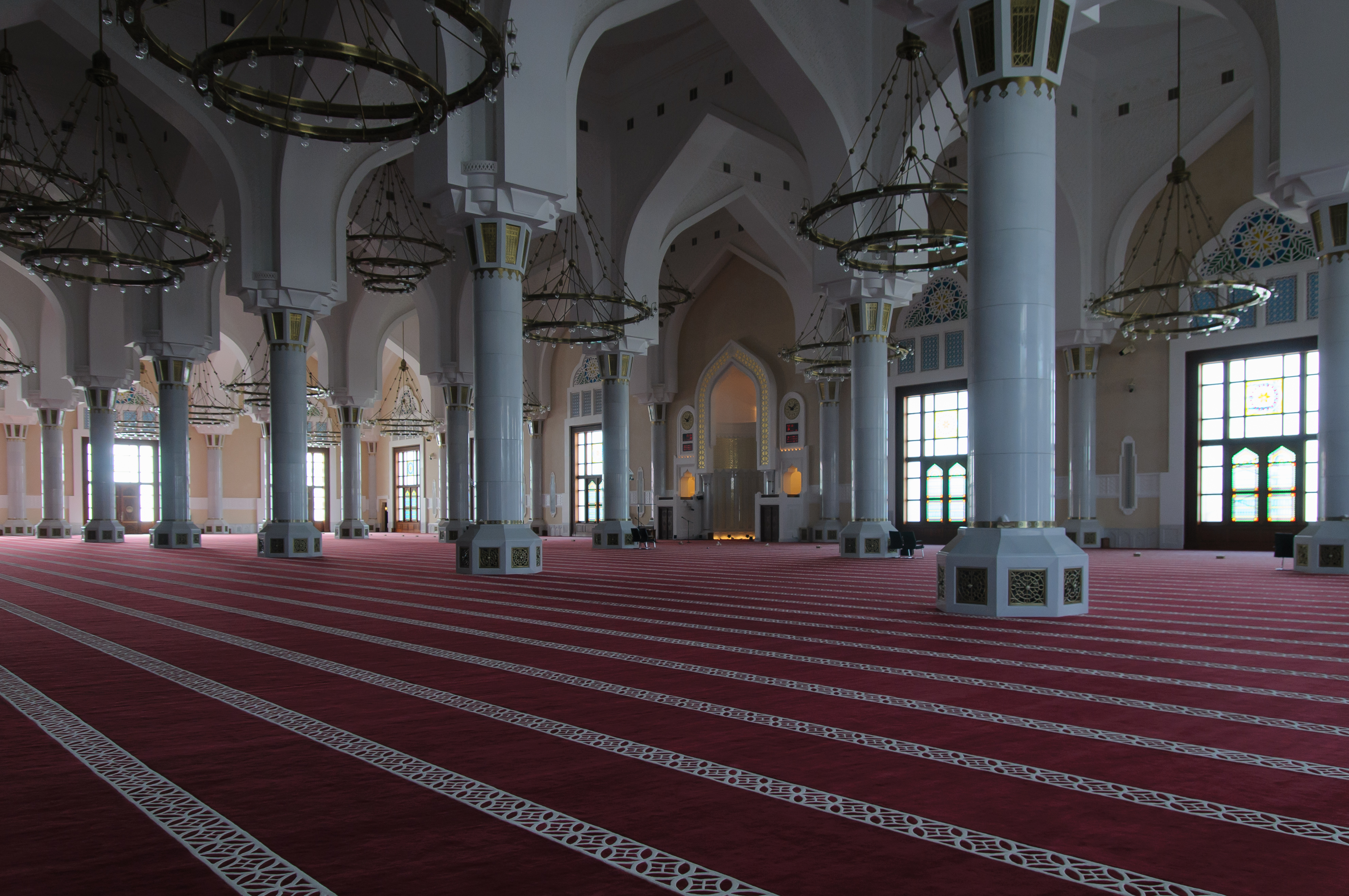
A typical indoor prayer hall in a Qatari mosque

The constitution states Islam is the state religion and sharia shall be "a main source" of legislation. According to the constitution, the Emir must be Muslim. The constitution guarantees to anyone the freedom to practice religious rites in accordance with "the maintenance of public order and morality." The law punishes "offending" Islam or any of its rites or beliefs or committing blasphemy against Islam, Christianity, or Judaism. Sunni and Shia Muslims and eight Christian denominations constitute the registered religious groups in the country. Unregistered religious groups are illegal, but authorities generally permitted them to practice their faith privately. Proselytizing for any faith other than Islam is prohibited.

=== Sunni Islam ===
Sunnis account for the majority of Qatar's Muslim population at upwards of 90%. Most Sunnis adhere to the Hanbali school of Islam though the scenario is changing with state sponsorship of more moderate form of Islam, some leaning towards the Shafi'i school. The country's state mosque is Imam Muhammad ibn Abd al-Wahhab Mosque, which was named in honor of Muhammad ibn Abd al-Wahhab of the Najd. In 2017, there was a request published on the Saudi newspaper Okaz signed by 200 descendants of Ibn Abd al-Wahhab to change the name of the mosque, because according to their statement "it does not carry its true Salafi path".

=== Shia Islam ===
In 2009, the PEW Research Center estimated that Shias comprised around 10% of Qatar's Muslim population. Several of Qatar's most notable merchant families have historically been Shia. Qatari Shias are granted religious liberty and some have held government positions. In contrast to the Shias in nearby Bahrain, the Qatari Shias have an identical dress, dialect and culture to Qatari Sunnis. However, there have been a small amount of societal conflicts between Shias and Sunnis within the country. One notable instance is the attempted demolition of a Shia cemetery near Doha in 2011 by a group of Wahhabi extremists allegedly affiliated with Qatar's Islamic ministry. Upon receiving news of this event, The Emir of Qatar Hamad bin Khalifa condemned the attempt and attended a Shia funeral as a sign of respect.

== Islamic holidays ==
=== Ramadan ===
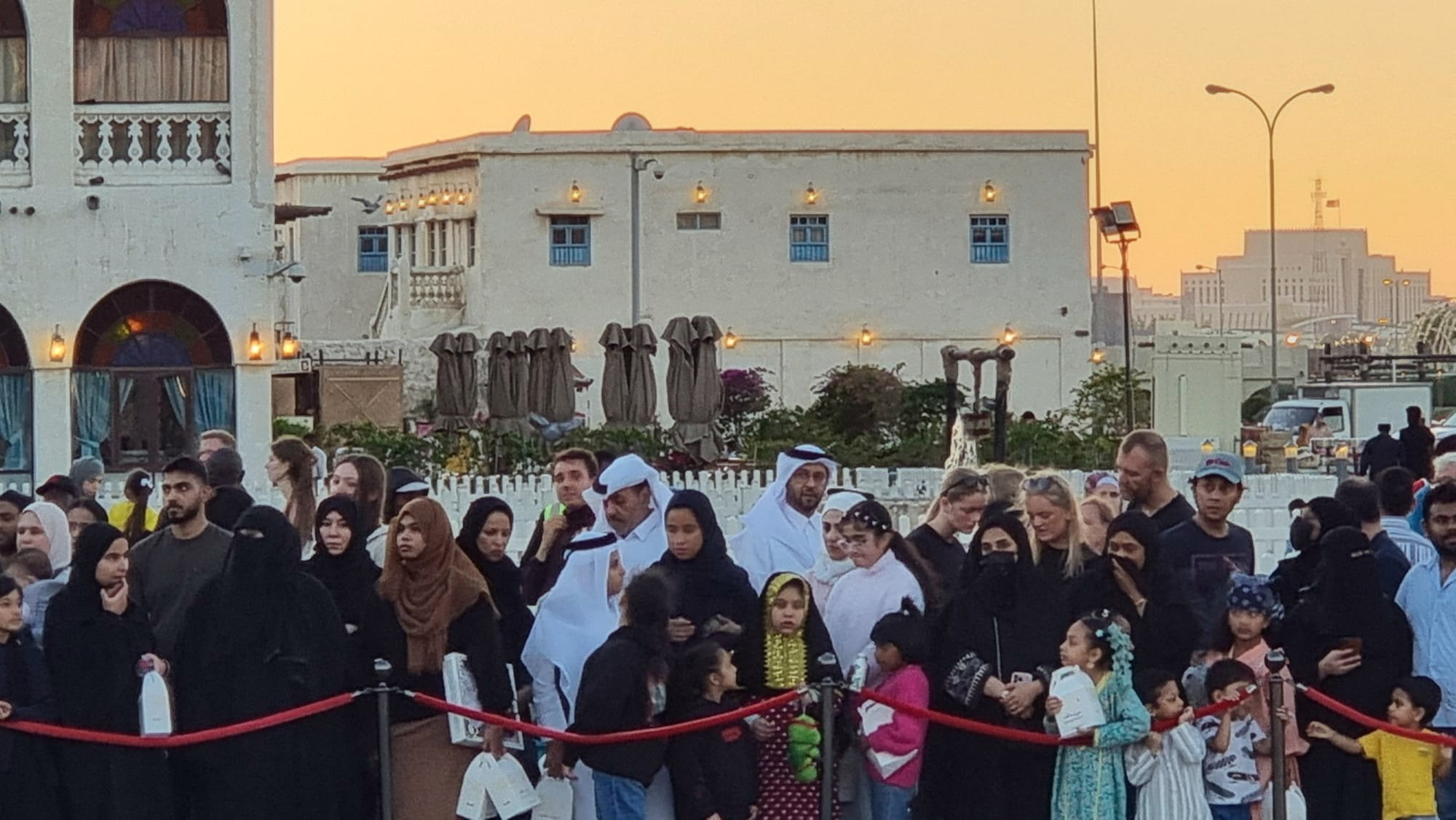
Onlookers gathered to watch to the Ramadan cannon at Souq Waqif

Ramadan, the ninth and most revered month of the Islamic calendar, holds profound significance for Muslims worldwide. This period is characterized by the obligatory observation of fasting (sawm), wherein adherents abstain from consuming food and beverages from dawn until dusk. In Qatar, the commencement and culmination of Ramadan are determined by the Moon Sighting Committee within the Ministry of Awqaf and Islamic Affairs. This committee observes the crescent moon, signaling both the conclusion of Ramadan and the onset of Eid al-Fitr, the festival of breaking the fast. The cyclic nature of the lunar Islamic calendar, with months alternating between 29 and 30 days in length, shifts its start date approximately ten days earlier each year.

Preceding the commencement of fasting, Qataris engage in preparatory rituals and communal gatherings, exemplified by the observance of Sha'ban, the month prior to Ramadan, with Al-Nafla festivities. Families share traditional meals such as harees and tharid with neighbors and the less fortunate. During Ramadan, Qatar's cities are adorned with festive decorations and host several pre-fasting celebrations. Hotels, restaurants, and cultural venues hold special events and offer promotions.

The daily fast commences at sunrise, following the consumption of suhur, the pre-dawn meal designed to sustain individuals throughout the day. Iftar is the meal marking the fast's conclusion at sunset and typically begins with the consumption of dates. This is accompanied by the traditional firing of a Ramadan cannon, a practice steeped in historical significance. This tradition, continuing to this day in Qatar, is broadcast live on national television and can be observed at various locations such as Souq Waqif, Katara Cultural Village and Imam Muhammad ibn Abd al-Wahhab Mosque. In the hours following iftar, the city bustles with activity as businesses and cultural venues reopen after daytime closures. Tarawih prayers are held in mosques following the evening prayer (Isha) to complete the recitation of the Qur'an by the conclusion of Ramadan.

In the past, al-musaharati roamed the farjan (neighborhoods) during the month of Ramadan, beating his drum to wake people up for suhur. This drumming would be accompanied by Islamic chants, such as "Wake up sleeper to worship the creator." Once common in the country, this tradition is rarely practiced nowadays, though there has been a revival in recent years.

=== Eid ===
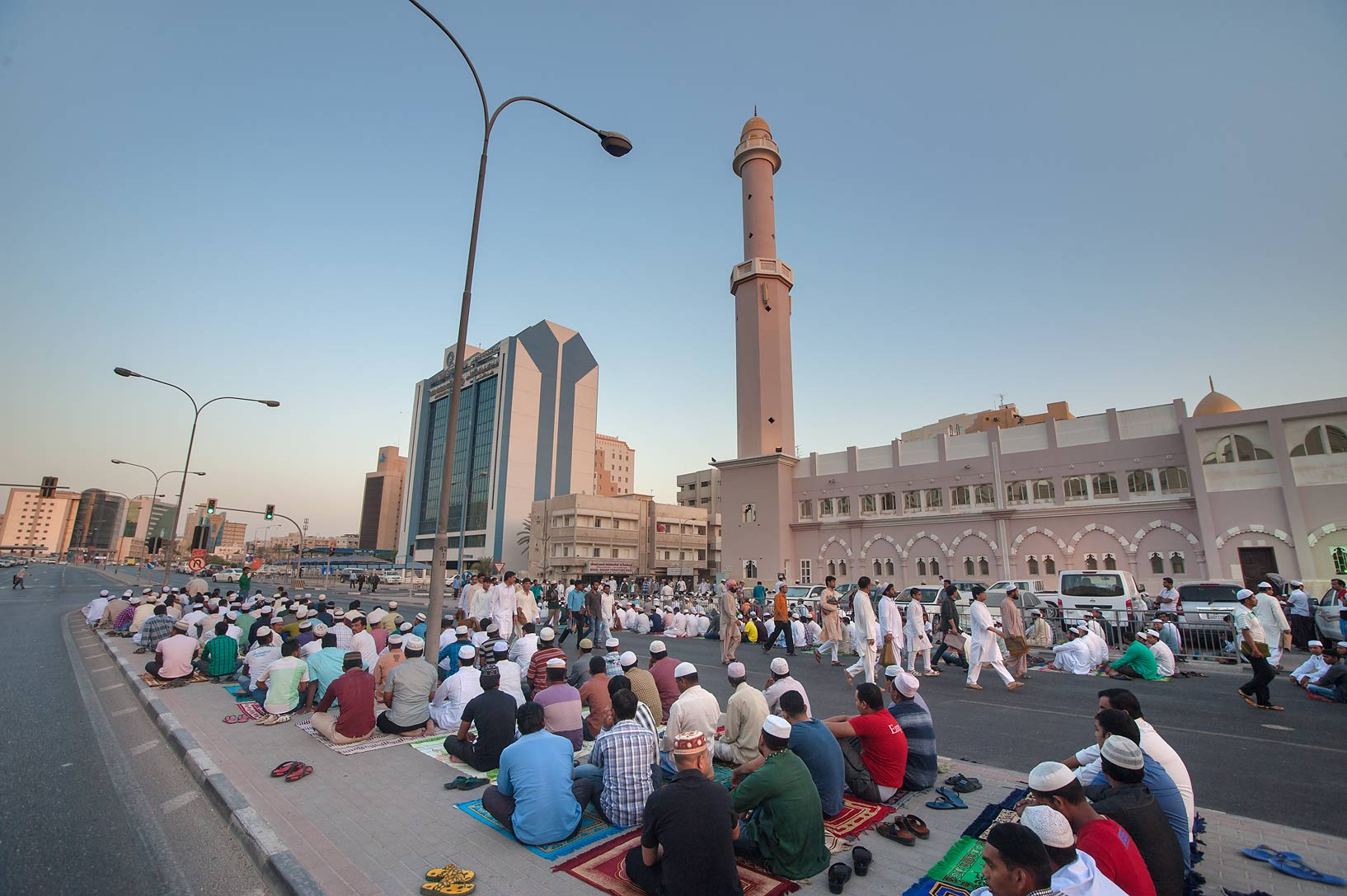
Eid al-Adha prayer near Al Asmakh Mosque in old Doha

Eid festivities in Qatar take place during significant dates in the Islamic lunar calendar. The two key holidays are Eid al-Fitr and Eid al-Adha. Eid al-Fitr, which means the "festivity of breaking the fast", takes place on the first day of the tenth month post-Ramadan. This event denotes the conclusion of fasting and promotes philanthropy. This nationwide holiday witnesses day-time closures of educational institutions, offices, and commercial establishments. Lively exhibitions and participatory happenings take place at shopping centers and public arenas. Applying henna is customary for Qatari women during Eid al-Fitr. The inaugural Eid Al-Fitr Festival, organized by Qatar Tourism, was launched on 4 May 2022 and lasted for three days. Celebrations were held on the Doha Corniche featuring performances from Qatari and Arab musicians. It is estimated that about 10,000 to 15,000 spectators attended the festivities each day.

Eid al-Adha, known as the "celebration of sacrifice", aligns with the conclusion of Hajj, the pilgrimage to Mecca. This event, observed on the tenth day of Dhu'l-Hijja, commemorates the narrative of Ibrahim's sacrificial act. Families convene for prayers and feasts during this event. Traditional customs entail the donation of meat from sacrificial livestock to kinfolk and the underprivileged.

Throughout Eid festivities, children traverse neighborhoods, exchanging greetings and collecting their eidiyah, a customary monetary gift. They recite folk songs and phrases while going door to door. Eid salutations like "Eid Mubarak" and "Eid Saeed" convey blessings and joy, while "Kul 'am wa enta bi-khair" extends wishes for good health and prosperity.

== Islamic traditions ==
=== Clothing ===
In Qatar, traditional attire is deeply influenced by the country's Islamic identity. Qatari nationals typically adhere to traditional forms of dress that reflect both their religious values and local customs. In some cases, a face covering such as the niqāb are worn by women to preserve their modesty. A burqa, an enveloping outer garment which fully covers the body and the face, is also sometimes worn.

Visitors to Qatar, while not expected to wear traditional Qatari clothing, are encouraged to dress modestly out of respect for local customs and Islamic values. For women, this generally involves covering the shoulders and knees. For male visitors, shorts are acceptable as long as they are knee-length and modest. Clothing with inappropriate slogans or graphics is discouraged, as it may be seen as disrespectful. Although there is no formal legal dress code for non-Qataris, societal expectations favor modesty, especially in public places.

=== Adhan ===
The adhan, or the Islamic call to prayer, is an important religious tradition in Qatar. Broadcast from mosques across the nation, the adhan is recited five times daily to announce the prescribed prayer times: Fajr (dawn), Duhr (midday), Asr (afternoon), Maghrib (sunset), and Isha (night). These times are determined by the position of the sun, and consequently, they vary throughout the year.

The adhan is delivered by the muezzin, an individual designated to call the faithful to prayer. Traditionally, the call was recited from the mosque's minaret without amplification, but in modern Qatar, loudspeakers are widely used, allowing the adhan to resonate through neighborhoods. The rhythmic chant begins with the Takbir ("Allahu Akbar," meaning "God is Great") and includes the Kalimah (declaration of faith).

Prayer, or Salat, is one of the Five Pillars of Islam and an expression of faith, obedience, and submission. The call to prayer reminds believers to pause from their daily activities and engage in worship. Qatar's urban planning reflects the importance of Salat, with mosques situated within walking distance of all residential areas to ensure accessibility for Muslims.

=== Haya Baya ===
Haya Baya is a regional tradition dating back several centuries that is practiced by girls aged 8 to 12 years old on the Day of Arafah, the ninth day of Dhu'l-Hijja in the Islamic calendar, which precedes Eid al-Adha. It is named after Dracaena trifasciata, commonly known as the snake plant in English and hayya bayya in Qatar, alternatively spelled hia bia. In Bedouin society, while young boys were traditionally engaged in manual labor and slaughtering animals in the months leading up to Eid al-Adha, such work was not expected of young girls; thus, they used their time to take care of and nurture plants, particularly the snake plant, but could also include grains like wheat and barley. These plants would be grown in small wicker baskets made of palm fronds. These baskets were nurtured and grown for about eight days or more, starting from the first day of Dhu'l-Hijja. They would then be tossed into the sea at sunset on the Day of Arafah, symbolizing the larger sacrifices associated with Eid al-Adha.

During this ceremonial sacrifice, the girls dress in traditional attire, such as the al bakhnaq embroidered with zari thread, and perform songs specific to the occasion, such as praying to God to make their Eid joyous and for the safe return of pilgrims from Hajj. This historically provided an alternative form of participation in the festive aspects of Eid al-Adha for girls. The practice continues to be promoted and practiced by cultural institutions.

=== Islamic phrases ===
It is common to hear Muslims use phrases such as "alhamdulillah", which means "praise be to God" or "thank God", and "Inshallah", which means "if God wills it". The traditional Arabic Muslim greeting of "as-salamu alaikum", means "peace be upon you". References to God, such "ya Allah" and "Allahu akhbar", can be heard in times of tribulation or celebration.

== Islamic visitor attractions ==
Education City Mosque is renowned for its architecture which is adorned with Arabic calligraphy. It has a worshiper capacity of 1,800 in its main prayer hall and 1,000 in its courtyard.

The Museum of Islamic Art, Doha, built in 2008, was inspired by Islamic architecture. The Museum of Islamic Art represents Islamic art from three continents over 1,400 years. Its collection includes metal work, ceramics, jewelry, wood work, textiles, and glass obtained from three continents and dating from the 7th to the 20th century.

The Sheikh Abdullah Al Ansari Complex for the Holy Quran and Science was opened over a 5,000 square meter area in Hazm Al Markhiya, Doha in 2014. Containing many religious and literary works, the complex hosts the Qatari Calendar House, the Center for Islamic Studies, and the Sheikh Al-Ansari Library. It was named after the founder of the Qatari Almanac, which served as an important guide for Muslims all over the Persian Gulf since its first publication in the 1950s.

== See also ==
- Islam by country
- Ministry of Awqaf and Islamic Affairs
