= Public holidays in Qatar =

Qatar observes several public holidays. The two weekend days are Friday and Saturday, similarly to many other Islamic countries. Annual public holidays include:

Date	English name	Local (Arabic) name	Description
Second Tuesday in February	National Sports Day	اليوم الوطني للرياضة	A public holiday. Started in 2012.
18 December	Qatar National Day	اليوم الوطني لقطر	National Day of Qatar.
1st, 2nd, 3rd Shawwal	Eid al-Fitr	عيد الفطر	Commemorates end of Ramadan.
10th, 11th, 12th Zulhijjah	Eid al-Adha	عيد الأضحى	Commemorates Ibrahim's willingness to sacrifice his son. Also known as the Big Feast (celebrated from the 10th to 13th).

Several holidays are celebrated by the government or banks as well. In 2009, Cabinet Decision No. 33 was passed by the Emir, decreeing the first Sunday in March as an official holiday for all financial institutions in Qatar.

== Holidays ==
=== Ramadan ===
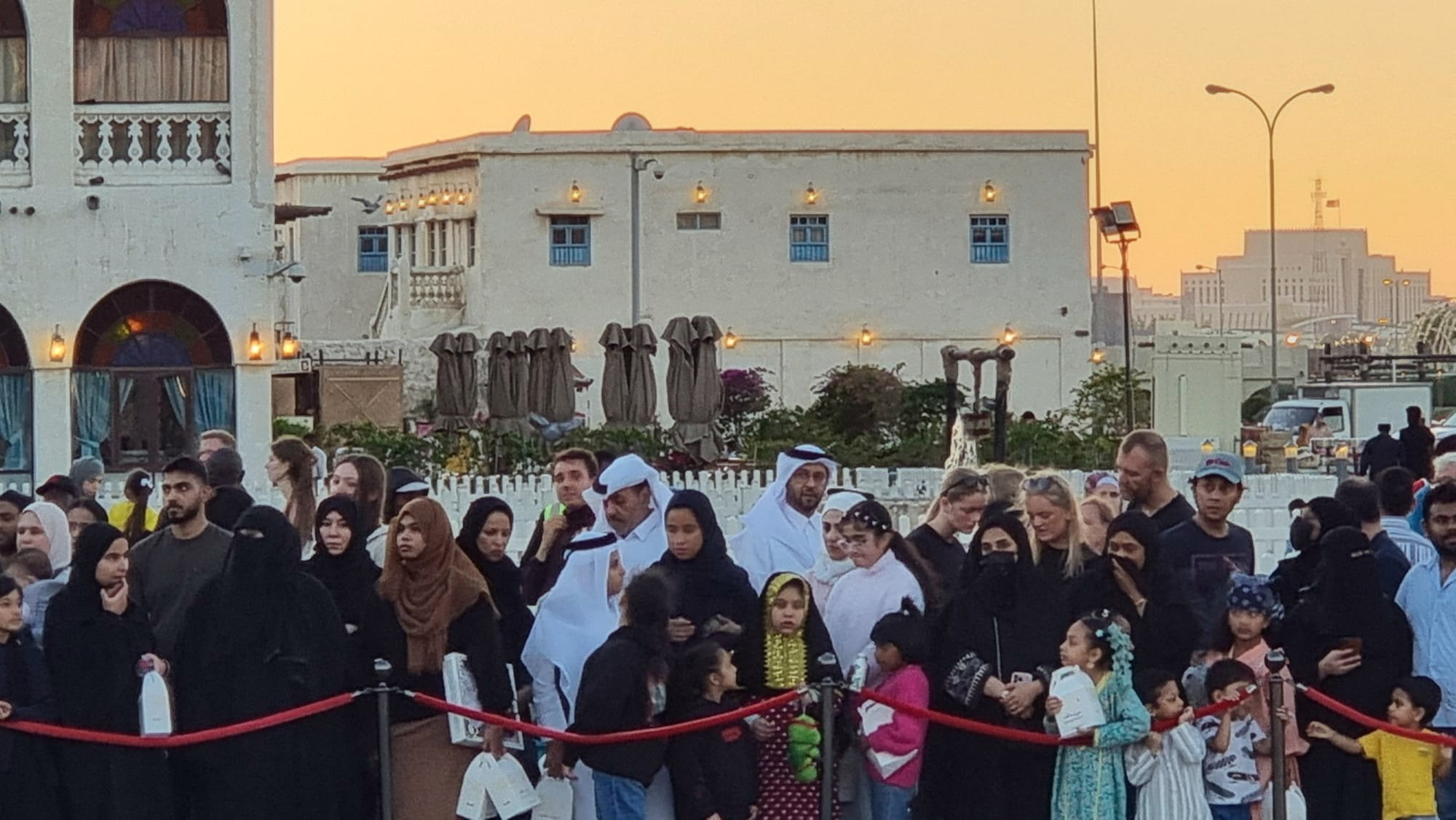
Onlookers gathered to watch to the Ramadan cannon at Souq Waqif

Ramadan is the ninth month of the Islamic calendar and is characterized by the obligatory observation of fasting (sawm), wherein adherents abstain from consuming food and beverages from dawn until dusk. In Qatar, the beginning of Ramadan is determined by the Moon Sighting Committee within the Ministry of Awqaf and Islamic Affairs, which observes the crescent moon, signaling both the conclusion of Ramadan and the onset of Eid al-Fitr, the festival of breaking the fast.

Prior to fasting, Qataris observe the Sha'ban, the month prior to Ramadan, with Al-Nafla festivities. During these festivities, families share traditional meals such as harees and tharid with neighbors and the less fortunate.

The daily fast begins at sunrise following the consumption of suhur, a meal intended to keep individuals nourished throughout the day. In the past, al-musaharati roamed the farjan (neighborhoods) during Ramadan, beating his drum and reciting poetry to wake people up for suhur. Iftar, the meal marking the fast's conclusion at sunset, typically begins with the consumption of dates. This is accompanied by the firing of a Ramadan cannon, a tradition which is broadcast live on national television and can be observed at locations such as Souq Waqif, Katara Cultural Village and Imam Muhammad ibn Abd al-Wahhab Mosque.

Al Ghabqa, a feast that takes place at night during Ramadan following iftar and tarawih prayers, features various dishes such as grilled and fried fish, rice cooked with date extract, and tharid. It also typically offers an assortment of sweets such as luqaimat and asida, alongside dates, tea, and Arabic coffee.

=== Garangao ===
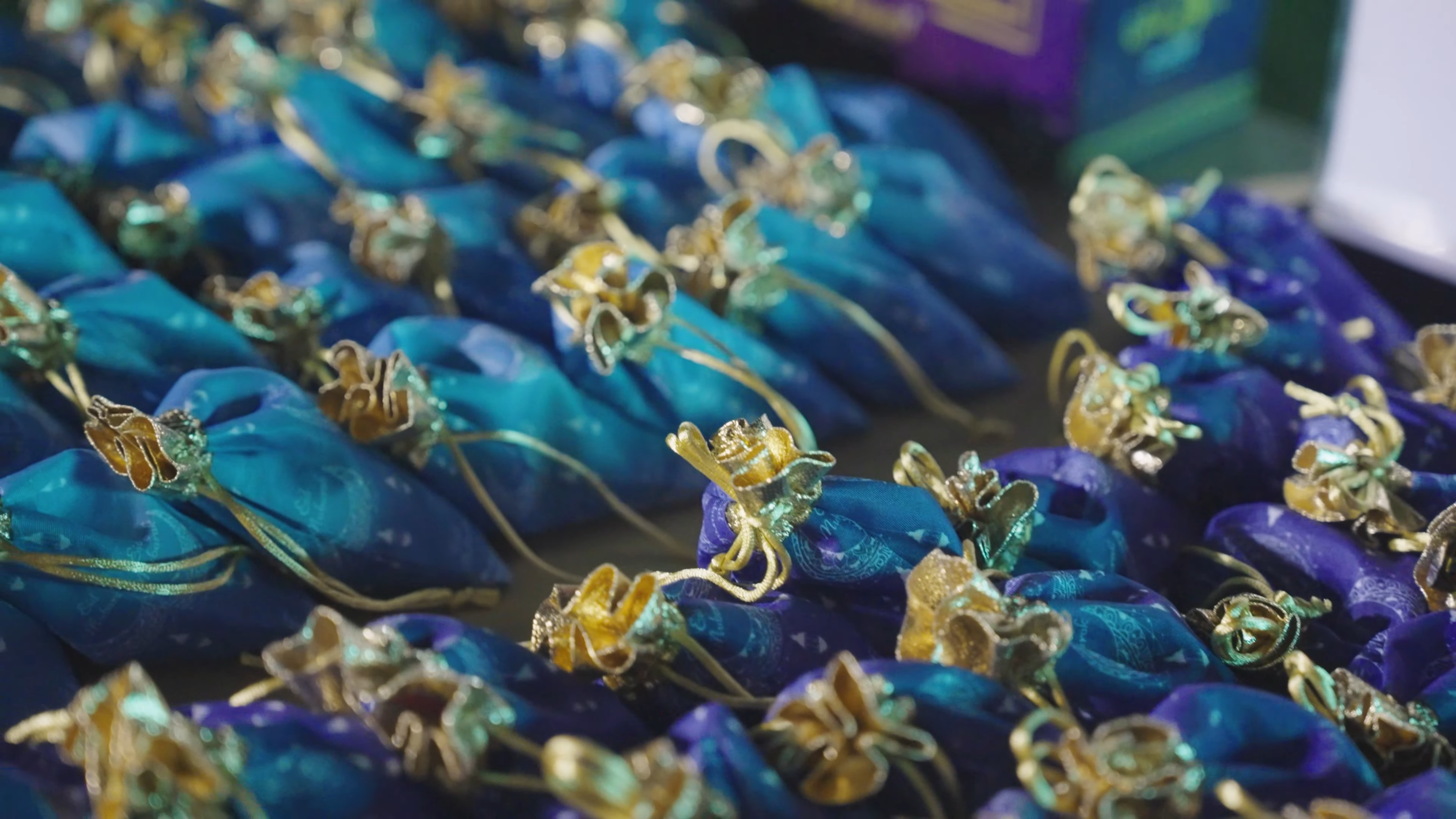
Garangao bags given out to children

Garangao is celebrated on the 15th night of Ramadan. The name derives from the Arabic word garqaa, denoting a rattling or shaking motion. It is celebrated throughout the Middle East, with slight variations. On Garangao night, children wear colorful attire and visit homes, singing traditional songs and receiving sweets and gifts from residents. In contemporary times, Garangao is celebrated on a larger scale, with events taking place in shopping malls, mosques, and cultural organizations.

=== Eid ===
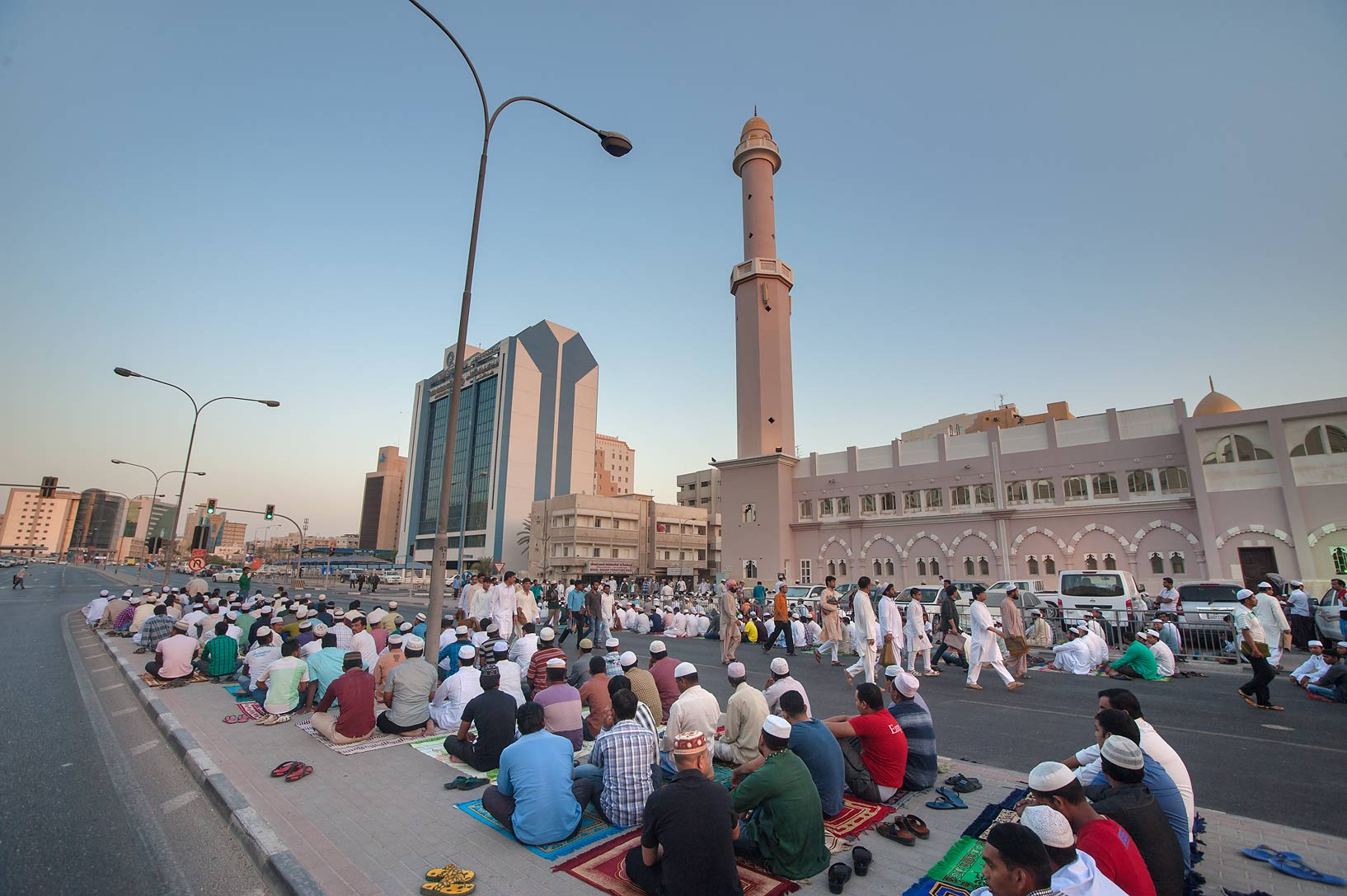
Eid al-Adha prayer near Al Asmakh Mosque in old Doha

The two Eid holidays, celebrated by all Muslims, are Eid al-Fitr and Eid al-Adha.

==== Eid al-Fitr ====
Eid al-Fitr, translating to the "festivity of breaking the fast", takes place on the first day of the tenth month. Designated a nationwide holiday in Qatar, educational institutions, offices, and commercial establishments are closed during this period. Many related events take place at shopping centers and public arenas. Applying henna is customary for Qatari women during Eid al-Fitr. The inaugural Eid Al-Fitr Festival, organized by Qatar Tourism, was launched on 4 May 2022 and lasted for three days. Celebrations were held on the Doha Corniche featuring musical performances; it was estimated that about 10,000 to 15,000 spectators attended each day.

==== Eid al-Adha ====
Eid al-Adha, known as the "celebration of sacrifice", occurs during the conclusion of Hajj, the pilgrimage to Mecca. This event is observed on the tenth day of Dhu al-Hijja (12th month), where families meet for prayers and feasts. Traditionally, donating meat to the less privileged is practiced during this day.

Throughout Eid festivities, children in Qatar travel door-to-door singing folk songs and phrases to receive their eidiyah, a customary monetary gift. Eid greetings like "Eid Mubarak" and "Eid Saeed" convey blessings and joy, while "Kul 'am wa enta bi-khair" conveys wishes for good health and prosperity.

=== Majlis Al Oud ===
On the first day of Eid al-Fitr, families hold large feasts in what is known as Great Majlis or Majlis Al Oud. During this event, it customary for the men of the family to congratulate their leader on the feast.

=== Qatar National Day ===
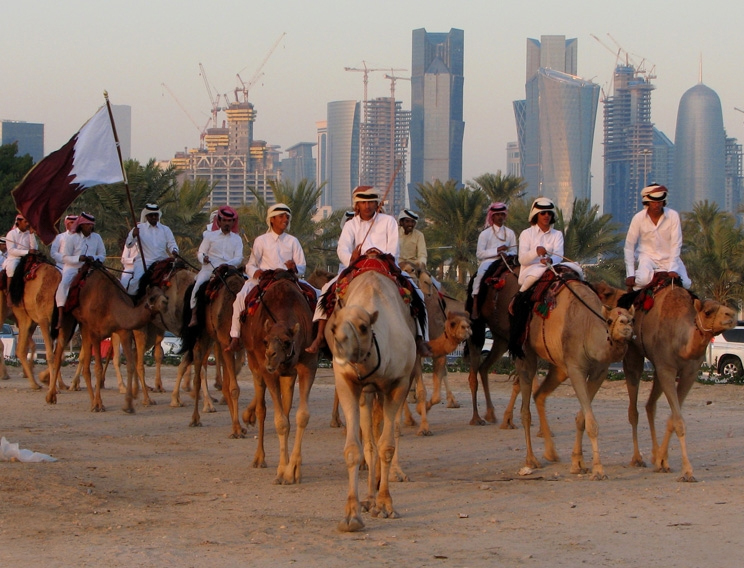
Camel parade during Qatar National Day

Qatar National Day is an annual celebration of the date that Jassim bin Mohammed Al Thani succeeded his father Mohammed bin Thani as ruler of Qatar, uniting its tribes and earning the country additional autonomy. In 2008, the date of the Qatar National Day was changed from 3 September to 18 December, to reflect the exact date of succession.

Various activities and events mark the day. The largest of these events is the Qatar National Day Parade, which takes place along the Doha Corniche and includes the showcasing of military equipment, folk music and firework shows. Events also take place at Souq Waqif and Katara Cultural Village.

In the days preceding Qatar National Day, the Darb Al Saai festival, organized by Qatar's Ministry of Culture, is held in Umm Salal Mohammed. Activities include the ceremonial flag-raising, military performances, and local musicians' live performances of sea music. The event also features exhibitions and workshops on traditional crafts and folklore.

=== National Sports Day ===
Qatar's National Sports Day has been celebrated annually on the second Tuesday of February as a recognized holiday since its inaugural edition in 2012. It features activities promoting fitness and well-being.

Various events take place at venues such as Education City, Aspire Park, and the Doha Corniche. In collaboration with the Qatar Olympic Committee and the Ministry of Sports and Youth, these events feature activities such as races, yoga, golf, team sports, and educational workshops, complemented by appearances from sports personalities.

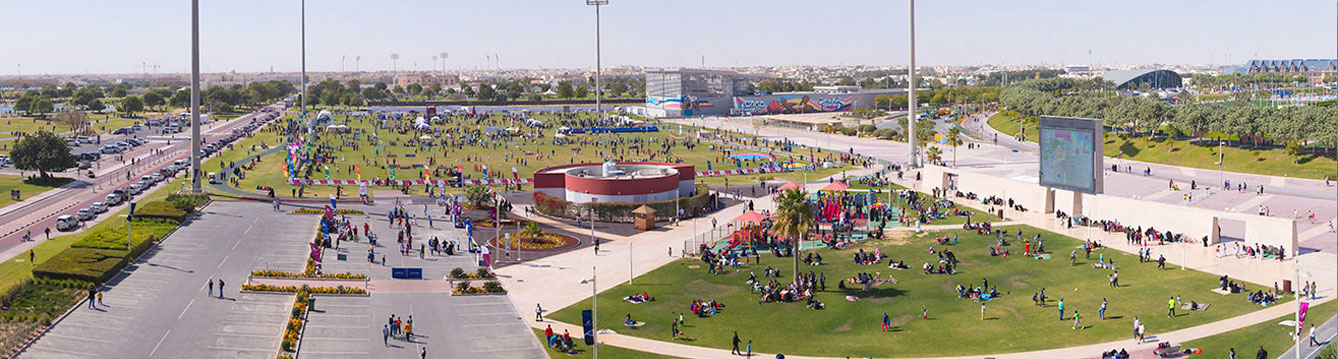
People participating in National Sports Day at the Aspire Zone
