= List of alumni of Sandhurst =

The notable Alumni of the Royal Military College and the Royal Military Academy Sandhurst are numerous. This list includes, among other individuals, a large number of generals and Victoria Cross holders from the former Royal Military College, Sandhurst.

This list contains a number of students who did not complete the course. Some of the members of foreign royal families were not commissioned into the British Army.

Despite claims to the contrary, Idi Amin and Muammar Gaddafi did not attend Sandhurst.

The Sandhurst Foundation acts as a community for the alumni of the Royal Military Academy.

== Royalty ==
=== Commonwealth realms ===
- William, Prince of Wales ("William Wales") (Blues and Royals)
- Prince Harry, Duke of Sussex ("Harry Wales") (Blues and Royals)
- Prince Edward, Duke of Kent (Royal Scots Greys)
- Prince Michael of Kent (11th Hussars)
- Prince Henry, Duke of Gloucester (The King's Royal Rifle Corps)
- Prince Arthur of Connaught (7th Queen's Own Hussars)
- Prince Adolphus, Duke of Teck (17th Lancers)
- Prince Francis of Teck (9th Queen's Royal Lancers)
- Prince Christian Victor of Schleswig-Holstein (King's Royal Rifles)

=== Albania ===
- Crown Prince Leka
- Prince Leka

=== Bahrain ===
- Hamad bin Isa Al-Khalifa, King of Bahrain
- Khalifa bin Ahmed Al-Khalifa
- Sheikh Nasser bin Hamad Al Khalifa
- Sheikh Khalid bin Hamad Al Khalifa

=== Bhutan ===
- Prince Dasho Khamsum Singye Wangchuck

=== Brunei ===
- Hassanal Bolkiah (Coldstream Guards)
- Prince Mohamed Bolkiah (Irish Guards)
- Prince Abdul Azim
- Prince Abdul Mateen (Household Cavalry Mounted Regiment)
- Prince Abdul Fattaah
- Prince Abdul Mu'min
- Halbi bin Mohammad Yussof
- Saifulrizal Abdul Latif
- Shanonnizam Sulaiman
- Norsuriati Sharbini

=== Greece ===
- Crown Prince Pavlos (Royal Scots Dragoon Guards (Carabiniers and Greys))

=== India ===
- Prince Mukarram Jah, titular Nizam of Hyderabad
- Prince Victor Duleep Singh, head of the Royal House of the Punjab

=== Jordan ===
- King Talal of Jordan
- King Hussein of Jordan
- King Abdullah II of Jordan (13th/18th Royal Hussars (Queen Mary's Own))
- Crown Prince Hussein of Jordan
- Princess Salma of Jordan
- Princess Aisha of Jordan
- Princess Iman of Jordan
- Prince Ali of Jordan
- Prince Hamzah of Jordan
- Prince Hashim of Jordan
- Prince Rashid of Jordan
- Princess Basma Fatima of Jordan
- Prince Talal of Jordan

=== Kuwait ===
- Abdullah the son of Mohammed Khaled Al-Khadher who is Chief of Staff of Kuwait Armed Forces
- Sheikh Ali Sabah Al-Salim Al-Sabah, son of previous Emir of Kuwait and ex Minister of Defence
- Sheikh Ahmed Khaled Al Jarrah Al Sabah, son of Minister of Interior
- Sheikh Thamer Jaber al-Ahmad al-Sabah, son of previous Emir of Kuwait, current Ambassador to the Kingdom of Bahrain
- Sheikh Abdullah Nasser Sabah Al-Ahmad Al-Sabah, grandson of Emir of Kuwait
- Sheikh Mubarak Abdullah Al-Jaber Al-Sabah, first Chief of the General Staff of the Kuwaiti Army
- Sheikh Yousuf Ali Yousuf Al-Sabah
- Sheikh Khalid Sabah Al-Khalid Al-Sabah, son of Crown Prince of Kuwait
- Sheikh Jaber Saad Al-Sabah (International Sword of Honor)

=== Liechtenstein ===
- Alois, Hereditary Prince of Liechtenstein (Coldstream Guards)
- Prince Franz Josef of Liechtenstein (Grenadier Guards).

=== Luxembourg ===
- Jean, Grand Duke of Luxembourg (Irish Guards)
- Henri, Grand Duke of Luxembourg
- Guillaume V, Grand Duke of Luxembourg
- Prince Jean of Luxembourg
- Prince Sebastian of Luxembourg
- Prince Wenceslas of Nassau

=== Malaysia ===
- Sirajuddin, Raja of Perlis
- Abdullah, Sultan of Pahang
- Mizan Zainal Abidin, Sultan of Terengganu
- Tengku Amir Shah, Raja Muda of Selangor
- Tengku Hassanal Ibrahim Alam Shah, Regent of Pahang
- Tengku Amir Nasser Ibrahim Shah, Tengku Panglima Raja of Pahang

=== Morocco ===
- Prince Moulay Ismail of Morocco

=== Myanmar ===
- Colonel Thein Myint (Ambassador of Myanmar to Australia and New Zealand, Director General of Ministry of Labour Myanmar

=== Nepal ===
- Jung Bahadur Rana
- Chief of Army Staff General Satchit Rana.
- Chief of the Army Staff General Gaurav Shumsher JB Rana

=== Oman ===
- Qaboos bin Said al Said, Sultan of Oman from 1970 to 2020 (The Cameronians (Scottish Rifles))
- Theyazin bin Haitham, Crown Prince of Oman (Son of Haitham bin Tariq Sultan of Oman)

=== Qatar ===
- Sheikh Hamad bin Khalifa Al Thani, Emir of Qatar from 1995 to 2013
- Sheikh Tamim bin Hamad Al Thani, Emir of Qatar since 2013
- Sheikh Jasim bin Hamad bin Khalifa Al Thani, former heir apparent
- Sheikh Abdullah bin Khalifa Al Thani, Prime Minister of Qatar from 1996 to 2007
- Sheikh Hamad bin Khalid Al Thani
- Sheikh Hamad bin Jassim bin Hamad Al Thani

=== Saudi Arabia ===
- Prince Mutaib bin Abdullah
- Prince Khaled bin Abdullah
- Prince Khalid bin Sultan
- Prince Khalid bin Bandar
- Prince Saud bin Abdul-Muhsin
- Prince Sultan bin Fahd
- Prince Turki bin Talal

=== Spain ===
- King Alfonso XII of Spain

=== Sri Lanka ===
- General Tissa Weeratunga, Commander of the Sri Lanka Army from 1981 to 1985
- General Nalin Seneviratne, Commander of the Sri Lanka Army from 1985 to 1988
- General Hamilton Wanasinghe, Commander of the Sri Lanka Army from 1988 to 1991
- General Cecil Waidyaratne, Commander of the Sri Lanka Army from 1991 to 1993
- General Gerry Hector De Silva, Commander of the Sri Lanka Army from 1994 to 1996
- General Rohan Daluwatte, Commander of the Sri Lanka Army from 1996 to 1998

=== Eswatini ===
- Luhlabo Gcina Dhlamini, son of King Mswati III

=== Tonga ===
- King George Tupou V of Tonga

=== Thailand ===
- King Vajiravudh of Thailand (Durham Light Infantry)

=== United Arab Emirates ===
- Khalifa bin Zayed Al Nahyan, Ruler of Abu Dhabi and President of the UAE from November 2004 until his death in May 2022
- Mohamed bin Zayed Al Nahyan, Ruler of Abu Dhabi and President of the UAE
- Mohammed bin Rashid Al Maktoum, Ruler of Dubai
- Hamdan bin Mohammed Al Maktoum, Crown Prince of Dubai
- Rashid bin Mohammed Al Maktoum, hereditary Prince of Dubai
- Majid bin Mohammed Al Maktoum, Prince of Dubai
- Abdullah Bin Rashid Al Mualla, deputy ruler of Umm Al Quwain

== Aristocracy ==
- Richard Airey, 1st Baron Airey (34th (Cumberland) Regiment of Foot)
- Harold Alexander, 1st Earl Alexander of Tunis
- Denis Alexander, 6th Earl of Caledon (Irish Guards)
- Edmund Allenby, 1st Viscount Allenby 6th (Inniskilling) Dragoons
- Dudley Allenby, 2nd Viscount Allenby
- Michael Allenby, 3rd Viscount Allenby (Royal Hussars)
- Patrick Anson, 5th Earl of Lichfield (Grenadier Guards)
- Keith Arbuthnott, 15th Viscount of Arbuthnott
- George Baillie-Hamilton, 12th Earl of Haddington
- Joseph Bailey, 2nd Baron Glanusk
- Tufton Beamish, Baron Chelwood
- Henry Bentinck, 11th Earl of Portland
- George Bingham, 5th Earl of Lucan
- George Bingham, 6th Earl of Lucan
- William Birdwood, 1st Baron Birdwood (Royal Scots Fusiliers)
- Michael Bowes-Lyon, 18th Earl of Strathmore and Kinghorne (Scots Guards)
- Basil Brooke, 1st Viscount Brookeborough (Royal Fusiliers)
- Alan Burns, 4th Baron Inverclyde (Scots Guards)
- George Byng, 2nd Earl of Strafford
- Alexander Cambridge, 1st Earl of Athlone (7th Queen's Own Hussars)
- Peter Carington, 6th Baron Carrington (Grenadier Guards)
- Alan Cathcart, 6th Earl Cathcart
- Ferdinand Cavendish-Bentinck, 8th Duke of Portland
- Lord Eustace Cecil
- Richard Chaloner, 1st Baron Gisborough
- Dermot Chichester, 7th Marquess of Donegall (7th Queen's Own Hussars)
- Arthur Chichester, 4th Baron Templemore (Royal Fusiliers)
- William Clements, 3rd Earl of Leitrim
- William Duke Coleridge, 5th Baron Coleridge (Coldstream Guards)
- William Conolly-Carew, 6th Baron Carew
- Wykeham Cornwallis, 2nd Baron Cornwallis
- John Crichton, 5th Earl Erne
- Roland Cubitt, 3rd Baron Ashcombe
- Peregrine Cust, 6th Baron Brownlow (Grenadier Guards)
- Thomas Denman, 3rd Baron Denman
- Herbert Dixon, 1st Baron Glentoran (Royal Inniskilling Fusiliers)
- Daniel Dixon, 2nd Baron Glentoran (Grenadier Guards)
- Malcolm Douglas-Pennant, 6th Baron Penrhyn
- Thomas Dugdale, 1st Baron Crathorne
- John Eliot, 6th Earl of St Germans (Royal Scots Greys)
- Francis Fane, 12th Earl of Westmorland
- Bernard Fergusson, Baron Ballantrae
- Ronald Munro Ferguson, 1st Viscount Novar (Grenadier Guards)
- Charles FitzRoy, 10th Duke of Grafton
- Gerald FitzGerald, 8th Duke of Leinster (5th Royal Inniskilling Dragoon Guards)
- Arthur Foljambe, 2nd Earl of Liverpool
- Nigel Forbes, 22nd Lord Forbes (Grenadier Guards)
- Ian Fraser, Baron Fraser of Lonsdale
- David Freeman-Mitford, 2nd Baron Redesdale
- Thomas Fermor-Hesketh, 1st Baron Hesketh (Royal Horse Guards)
- Arthur French, 5th Baron de Freyne
- Shane Gough, 5th Viscount Gough
- Ralph Glyn, 1st Baron Glyn
- Gerald Grosvenor, 4th Duke of Westminster
- Gerald Grosvenor, 6th Duke of Westminster (North Irish Horse)
- Douglas Haig, 1st Earl Haig (7th Queen's Own Hussars)
- Richard Harries, Baron Harries of Pentregarth (Royal Corps of Signals
- Antony Head, 1st Viscount Head
- Victor Hervey, 6th Marquess of Bristol
- John Hope, 1st Marquess of Linlithgow
- Arthur Hope, 2nd Baron Rankeillour
- Michael Hughes-Young, 1st Baron St Helens
- Guy Innes-Ker, 10th Duke of Roxburghe
- Charles Innes-Ker, Marquess of Bowmont and Cessford (Blues and Royals)
- Hastings Ismay, 1st Baron Ismay (21st Prince Albert Victor's Own Cavalry)
- George Jeffreys, 1st Baron Jeffreys
- George Jellicoe, 2nd Earl Jellicoe (Coldstream Guards)
- Norton Knatchbull, 6th Baron Brabourne
- Francis Knollys, 1st Viscount Knollys
- Galbraith Lowry-Corry, 7th Earl Belmore
- Anthony Lowther, Viscount Lowther
- Frederick Lugard, 1st Baron Lugard
- Noel Lytton, 4th Earl of Lytton
- William Mansfield, 1st Baron Sandhurst
- Hugh Molyneux, 7th Earl of Sefton
- Lord William Montagu-Douglas-Scott
- William Napier, 13th Lord Napier
- Nigel Napier, 14th Lord Napier
- Roger Nathan, 2nd Baron Nathan
- Cyril Newall, 1st Baron Newall (Royal Warwickshire Regiment)
- Francis Newall, 2nd Baron Newall
- David Nickson, Baron Nickson
- David Ogilvy, 12th Earl of Airlie
- Thomas Towneley O'Hagan, 2nd Baron O'Hagan
- William Onslow, 6th Earl of Onslow
- William Orde-Powlett, 5th Baron Bolton
- Charles Paget, 6th Marquess of Anglesey
- Osbert Peake, 1st Viscount Ingleby
- Edward Plunkett, 18th Baron of Dunsany
- Harry Primrose, 6th Earl of Rosebery (Grenadier Guards)
- Henry Rawlinson, 1st Baron Rawlinson (King's Royal Rifle Corps)
- Peter Rawlinson, Baron Rawlinson of Ewell
- Frederick Roberts, 1st Earl Roberts (Bengal Artillery)
- Hercules Robinson, 1st Baron Rosmead (87th Foot)
- Anthony Royle, Baron Fanshawe of Richmond (Life Guards)
- Charles Sackville-West, 4th Baron Sackville (King's Royal Rifle Corps)
- Edward Seymour, 16th Duke of Somerset
- Evelyn Seymour, 17th Duke of Somerset
- Philip Sidney, 2nd Viscount De L'Isle
- Archibald Sinclair, 1st Viscount Thurso (Life Guards)
- John Sinclair, 1st Baron Pentland
- Randal Smith, 2nd Baron Bicester
- Henry Somerset, 10th Duke of Beaufort (Royal Horse Guards)
- George Somerset, 3rd Baron Raglan (Grenadier Guards)
- FitzRoy Somerset, 4th Baron Raglan
- John Spencer, 8th Earl Spencer (Royal Scots Greys)
- William Stanhope, 11th Earl of Harrington
- Frederick Stanley, 16th Earl of Derby (Grenadier Guards)
- Christopher Thomson, 1st Baron Thomson (Royal Engineers)
- George Tryon, 1st Baron Tryon (Grenadier Guards)
- Charles Tryon, 2nd Baron Tryon
- John Verney, 20th Baron Willoughby de Broke
- Henry Ward, 5th Viscount Bangor
- John Warrender, 2nd Baron Bruntisfield
- Archibald Wavell, 1st Earl Wavell (Black Watch)
- Piers Wedgwood, 4th Baron Wedgwood
- Luke White, 6th Baron Annaly
- Michael Willoughby, 11th Baron Middleton
- Alexander Windsor, Earl of Ulster (King's Royal Hussars) - 20th in line to the British Throne and heir to the Dukedom of Gloucester
- Alastair Windsor, 2nd Duke of Connaught and Strathearn (Royal Scots Greys)
- Barry Yelverton, 5th Viscount Avonmore

== Government ==
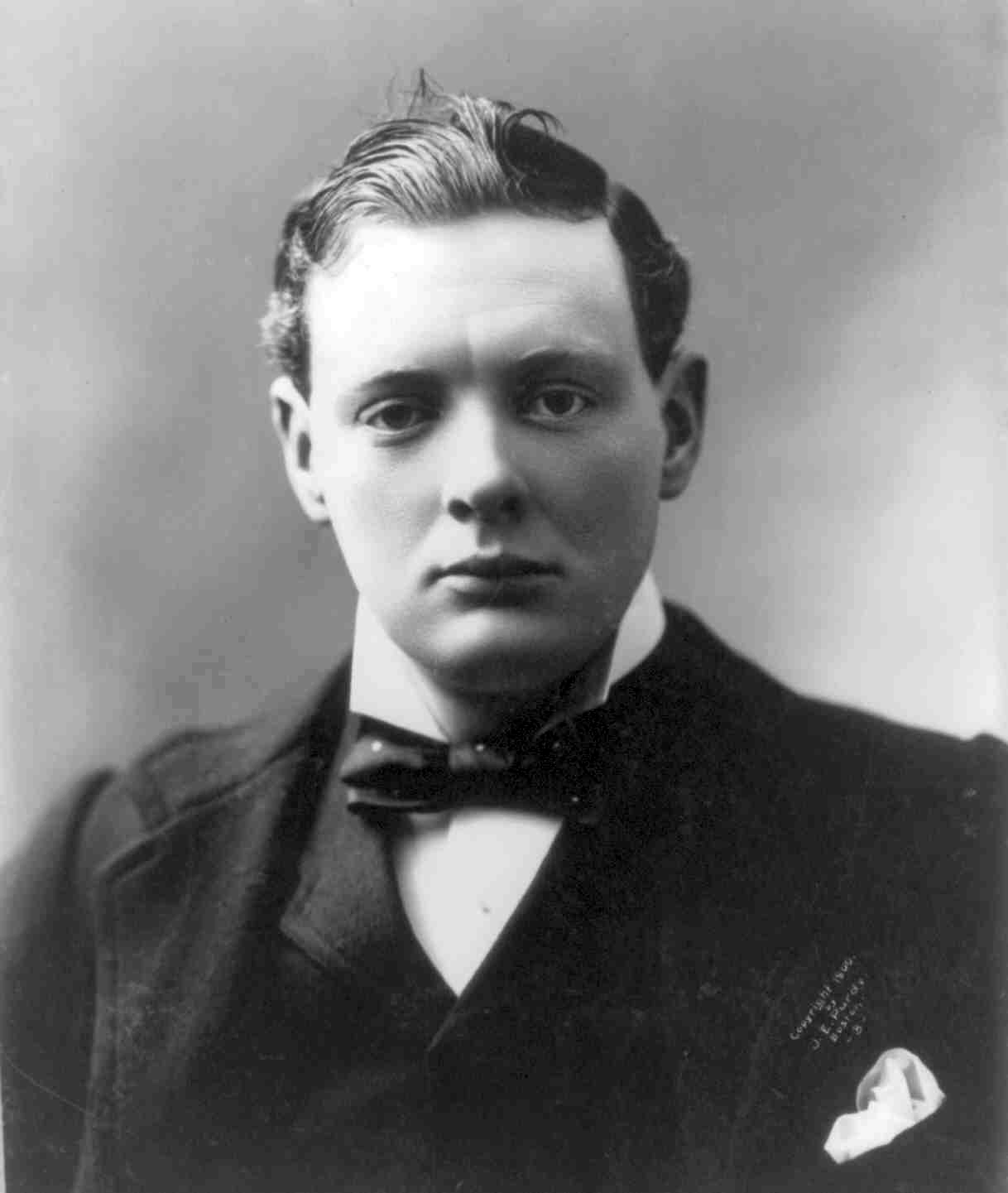
Winston Churchill

- His Majesty Sir Edward Mutesa - 1st president of Uganda
- Lieutenant General Akwasi Afrifa - 3rd Head of state of Ghana
- Anastasio Somoza Portocarrero - Nicaragua - 1973
- Brigadier David Lansana - Force Commander Sierra Leone Army, acting Head of State of Sierra Leone.
- Sir Winston Churchill (4th Queen's Own Hussars) - twice Prime Minister of the United Kingdom, so far only one to graduate from Sandhurst.
- Iain Duncan Smith (Scots Guards) - Member of Parliament
- Patrick Mercer (Worcestershire and Sherwood Foresters Regiment (29th/45th Foot)) - Member of Parliament
- Tobias Ellwood - Member of Parliament, Parliamentary Under-Secretary of State at the Ministry of Defence
- Sir Robert Cary, 1st Baronet (4th/7th Royal Dragoon Guards)
- Brigadier John Amadu Bangura, CBE - Chief of the Defence Staff of the Sierra Leone Armed Forces 1968 to 1970; Acting Governor-General of Sierra Leone (1968)
- Rajendrasinhji Jadeja - 1st Chief of Army Staff of the Indian army
- Ghanem bin Shaheen bin Ghanem Al Ghanim - Qatari Minister of Endowments and Islamic Affairs
- Syed Shahid Hamid - general in the Pakistan Army
- Hassan Katsina - Nigerian general, son of the Emir of Katsina, and military governor of the Northern Region of Nigeria
- Sir Oswald Mosley, 6th Baronet (16th The Queen's Lancers)
- Peter Carington, 6th Baron Carrington (Grenadier Guards)
- Iskander Mirza (The Cameronians (Scottish Rifles)) - the 1st President of Pakistan
- Lieutenant General Fred Akuffo- former Head of State of Ghana
- Mohammad Ayub Khan (14th Punjab Regiment) - President of Pakistan
- Major General Iliya D. Bisalla - Former commissioner of Defence of Nigeria
- William Champ (63rd (West Suffolk) Regiment of Foot) - the 1st Premier of Tasmania
- Seretse Khama Ian Khama - President of Botswana
- General Yakubu Gowon - 3rd Nigerian Head of State
- Major Chukwuma Kaduna Nzeogwu - leader of the first military coup in Nigeria
- Major Chris Anuforo - participant in the first military coup in Nigeria
- Kanwar Bahadur Singh - senior officer in the Indian Army
- Ahmed Mohammed Ali - Media Adviser to the Egyptian President
- Major-General Neville Alexander Odartey-Wellington- Ghanaian Army Commander
- General Cyril Ranatunga - Permanent Secretary, Ministry of Defence of Sri Lanka
- General Denis Perera - Commander of the Sri Lanka Army
- General Nalin Seneviratne - Commander of the Sri Lanka Army
- Lieutenant General Denzil Kobbekaduwa - senior officer in the Sri Lanka Army
- Major General Janaka Perera - senior officer in the Sri Lanka Army
- Major General Jayantha de S. Jayaratne - senior officer in the Sri Lanka Army
- Kojo Tsikata, Head of National Security and member of the Provisional National Defence Council, Ghana
- Muhoozi Kainerugaba, Chief of Defence Forces of the Uganda People's Defence Force (UPDF)
- Ian Kagame, officer of the Republican Guard Brigade of the Rwanda Defence Force and son of President Paul Kagame
- Dan Jarvis, - Member of Parliament, Secretary of State for Defence
- Louise Sandher-Jones, - Member of Parliament, Parliamentary Under-Secretary of State for the Armed Forces

== Authors and poets ==
- Antony Beevor (11th Hussars)
- Gerald Brenan
- Gordon Corrigan (Royal Gurkha Rifles)
- Keith Douglas (Nottinghamshire (Sherwood Rangers) Yeomanry Regiment)
- Sir Patrick Leigh Fermor (Irish Guards)
- Ian Fleming - did not complete course
- Harry Graham (Coldstream Guards)
- Richard Gwyn
- Geoffrey Kent
- John Masters (4th Prince of Wales's Own Gurkha Rifles)
- Hugh McManners (29 Commando Regiment RA)
- Michael Morpurgo
- Edward Plunkett, 18th Baron Dunsany
- George W. M. Reynolds
- Adrian Weale (Intelligence Corps)

== Artists ==
- Andrew Festing (The Rifle Brigade) - British royal portrait painter

== Actors ==
- Alex Brock (QRH) The Queen's Royal Hussars
- Patrick Cargill (Indian Army)
- David Niven (Highland Light Infantry (City of Glasgow Regiment))
- Richard Todd (Kings Own Yorkshire Light Infantry) and (British 6th Airborne Division)

== TV ==
- David Croft (Royal Artillery) - television scriptwriter and producer
- Darren Jordon - British TV news presenter

== Musicians ==
- James Blunt (Life Guards)
- Victor Silvester

== Sportsmen and Sportswomen ==
- Allan Cameron (Queen's Own Cameron Highlanders) - founder of the International Curling Federation
- Will Carling (Royal Regiment of Wales) - former captain of the England national rugby union team
- Jim Fox - Olympic gold-medal-winning modern pentathlete
- Wyndham Halswelle - Olympic gold-medal-winning 400 metres runner
- Devon Harris - Jamaican winter-Olympian
- Alastair Heathcote (Blues and Royals (Royal Horse Guards and 1st Dragoons)) - Olympic Rowing silver medalist
- Josh Lewsey (Royal Artillery) - England rugby international
- Mark Phillips (1st The Queen's Dragoon Guards) - Olympic gold-medal-winning horseman, Marathon des Sables and a campaigner against land mines
- Tim Rodber (Green Howards (Alexandra, Princess of Wales's Own Yorkshire Regiment)) - England rugby international
- Dudley Stokes - Jamaican four time winter-Olympian
- Murray Walker (Royal Scots Greys) - motor-racing commentator
- Peter West (Duke of Wellington's Regiment (West Riding), 33rd of Foot) - cricket commentator
- Heather Stanning - Number 1 female rower in the world since 2016, she is a double Olympic champion, double World champion, quadruple World Cup champion and double European champion.
- Bill Tancred (Royal Army Physical Training Corps Two-time Olympic discus thrower [10] Wikipedia Category: Olympic athletes of Great Britain

== Explorers ==
- John Blashford-Snell (Royal Engineers) - was also an instructor at RMAS in the early 1960s
- Sir Chris Bonington (Royal Fusiliers, commissioned into the Royal Tank Regiment)
- Daniel Byles (Royal Army Medical Corps)
- Justin Packshaw (Royal Dragoon Guards)
- Lawrence "Titus" Oates (6th (Inniskilling) Dragoons)
- Richard Profit (Royal Engineers)
- Ed Stafford, (Devonshire and Dorset Regiment)
- Sir Francis Younghusband (1st King's Dragoon Guards)
- Levison Wood (Parachute Regiment (United Kingdom))

== Archaeologists ==
- Martin Carver (Royal Tank Regiment)
- Sir Alexander Cunningham (King's Regiment)
- Augustus Pitt Rivers (Grenadier Guards)
- Sir Mortimer Wheeler (Royal Artillery)

== Chefs ==
- Keith Floyd (Royal Tank Regiment)

== Clergymen ==
- Mark Elvins (Royal Army Chaplains' Department)
- Jagraj Singh (Royal Logistic Corps)

== Other ==
- James Hewitt (Life Guards) - committed adultery with Diana, Princess of Wales
- Elizabeth Godwin - first female officer of The Life Guards
- Susan Ridge - (Army Legal Services) first female to hold the rank of Major General
- Simon Mann (Scots Guards) - mercenary
- Sir John Peace - Chairman of Standard Chartered, Experian and Burberry
- Timothy Peake - (British Army Air Corps), European Space Agency astronaut
- Roger Took - art historian, museum curator, author and convicted child sex offender
- Major General Sir Hugh Clement Sutton (Coldstream Guards) - Lieutenant-Governor and Secretary of Royal Chelsea Hospital
- Major-General Sir James Syme Drew, K.B.E., C.B., D.S.O., M.C., D.L., Director of the Territorial Army and Colonel of the Queen's Own Cameron Highlanders
- Bill Alexander - Communist activist, commander of the British Battalion of the International Brigades
- Ahmad Massoud - leader of the National Resistance Front of Afghanistan
- Gáspár Orbán Hungarian lawyer, soldier, religious leader and former professional footballer
- David Abel, Brigadier General of Myanmar Army
