= Abdullah bin Rashid Al Mualla III =

SHEIKH (born 1971)

Abdullah bin Rashid Al Mualla

SHEIKH
- Reign: 20 April 2004 – present
- Predecessor: Rashid bin Ahmed Al Mualla
- Born: 12 December 1971 (age 54)
- House: Al Mualla
- Father: Rashid bin Ahmad Al Mualla
- Religion: Islam
- Military career
- Allegiance: United Arab Emirates
- Branch: Umm Al Quwain
- Service years: 1997
- Commands: Appointed as the Head of the police and public security in the Emirate of Umm Al Quwain in 1994 - 2004
- Website: Facebook Profile; Instagram Profile; Twitter Profile; YouTube Channel; Official Website

Styles of Abdullah bin Rashid Al Mualla III
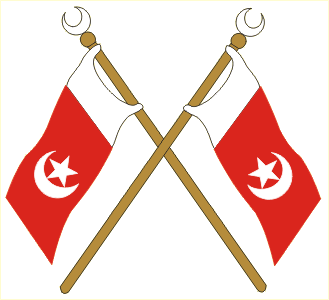
- Reference style: His Highness
- Spoken style: Your Highness

Sheikh Abdulla Bin Rashid Al Mualla (Arabic: الشيخ عبدالله بن راشد المعلا; born 12 December 1971) is the former Deputy Ruler of Umm Al Quwain. He is the son of late Sheikh Rashid bin Ahmad Al Mualla.

== Early life and education ==
Sheikh Abdullah Bin Rashid Al Mualla was born in the Emirate of Umm Al Quwain on 12 December 1971. He is the fifth son of Sheikh Rashid bin Ahmed Al-Mualla. Sheikh Abdullah Bin Rashid Al Mualla received his formal education in the United Arab Emirates and graduated from the Royal Military Academy Sandhurst in 1992 in the United Kingdom.

== Career ==
After graduating he was appointed as the head of the police and public security in the emirate of Umm Al Quwain in 1997

== See also ==
- List of alumni of Sandhurst
