= Lejbailat =

Lejbailat لجبيالت
- District
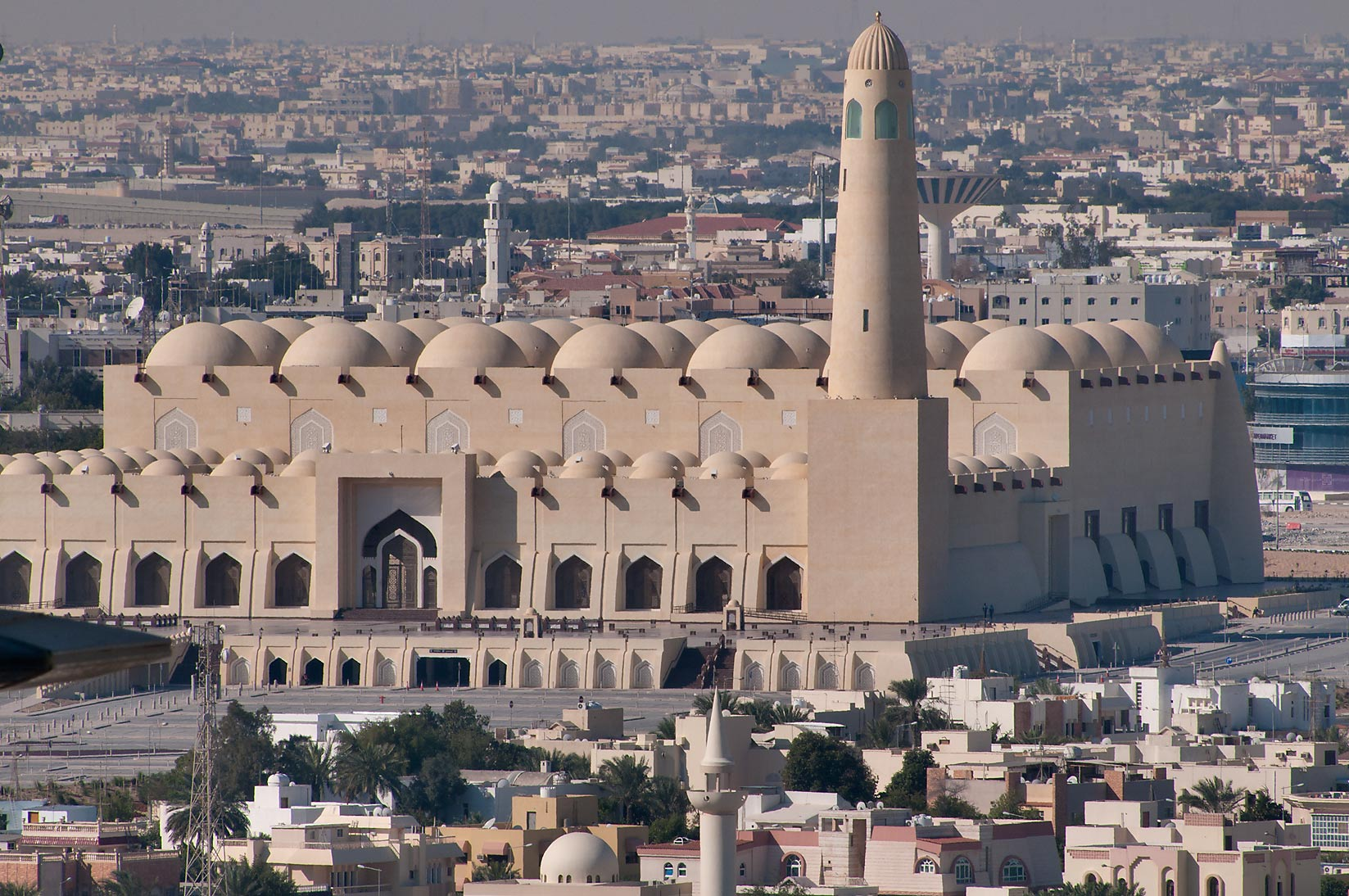
- View of Lejbailat and the Qatar State Mosque

- Location within Doha Location within Qatar
- Coordinates: 25°19′14″N 51°30′19″E
- Country: Qatar
- Municipality: Doha
- Zone: Zone 64
- District no.: 104

Area
  - Total: 1.4 km^{2} (0.54 sq mi)

Population
  - Total: 4,024
  - Density: 2,900/km^{2} (7,400/sq mi)

Lejbailat (Note: Arabic: لجبيالت, romanized: Lijbaīlāt; also spelled Al Jubailat and Al Jebailat) is a district in Qatar, located in the municipality of Doha. It has a relatively higher elevation compared to the rest of Doha and provides a vantage point of West Bay, one of Doha's main commercial districts. Qatar State Mosque, is situated in the district.

== Embassies ==
Lejbailat hosts the following embassies:

- Embassy of the Kingdom of Belgium in Doha
- (Peru) Peruvian Embassy in Doha
- (Uruguay) Uruguayan Embassy in Doha

== Transport ==
Major roads that run through the district are Abdul Aziz Bin Jassim Street, Khalifa Street, Al Markhiya Street and Onaiza Street.

== Demographics ==
As of the 2010 census, the district comprised 605 housing units and 53 establishments. There were 4,024 people living in the district, of which 52% were male and 48% were female. Out of the 4,024 inhabitants, 74% were 20 years of age or older and 26% were under the age of 20. The literacy rate was 98.4%.

Employed persons made up 57% of the total population. Females accounted for 40% of the working population, while males accounted for 60% of the working population.

Year	Population
1986	1,309
1997	2,276
2004	2,814
2010	4,024

== Education ==
The following school is located in Lejbailat:

Name of School	Curriculum	Grade	Genders	Official Website	Ref
Al Dana Private Kindergarten	Independent	Kindergarten	Both	N/A	

== Gallery ==
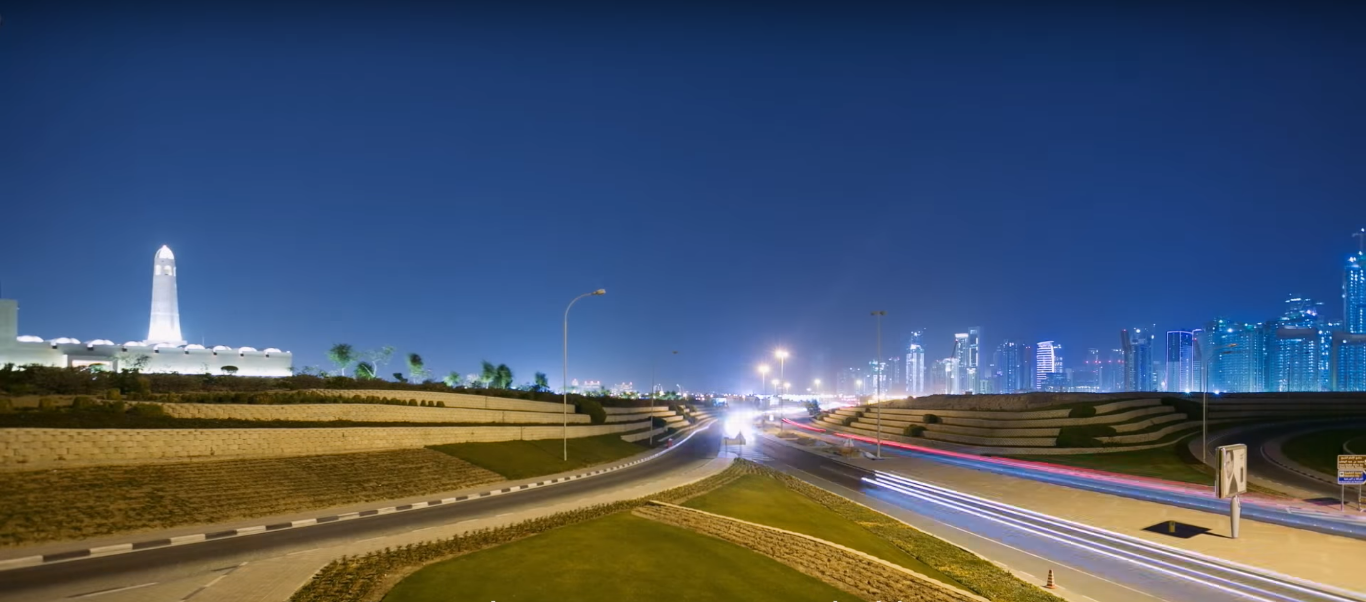
Diverging road overlooked by Qatar State Mosque in Lejbailat.

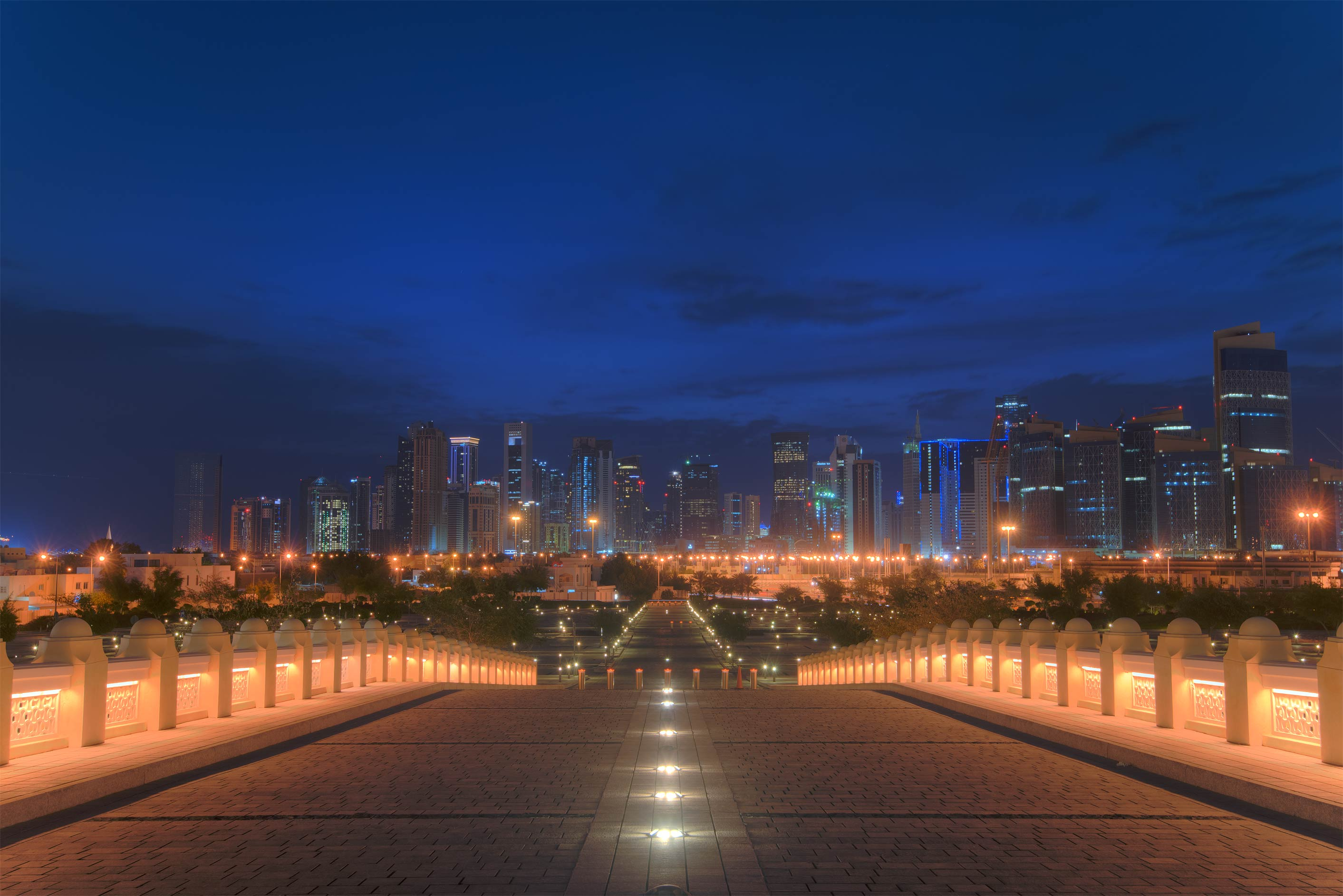
View from the mosque, overlooking West Bay.
