= Saad al-Ateeq =

Saudi Arabian Islamic scholar (born 1969)

Sa'ad bin Ateeq bin Misfer al-Ateeq
- سعد بن عتيق بن مسفر العتيق
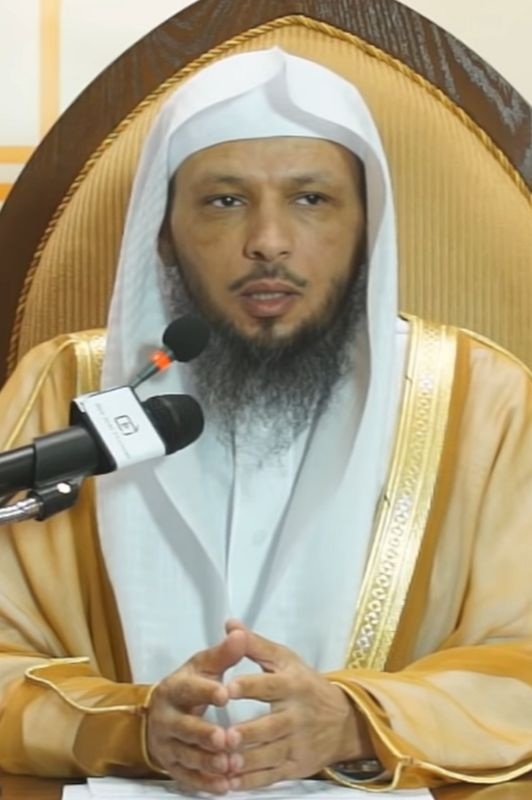

Personal life
- Born: 1969 (age 56–57) Saudi Arabia

Religious life
- Religion: Islam
- Denomination: Sunni
- Jurisprudence: Salafi

Muslim leader
- Influenced by: Ibn Baz; Al-Uthaymin; Ibn Jibrin; Abdullah Al Mutlaq
- Awards: Dubai International Holy Quran Award

Sa'ad bin Ateeq bin Misfer Al Ateeq (Arabic: سعد بن عتيق بن مسفر العتيق; born 1969), is an Islamic preacher, religious scholar, thinker and university professor from Saudi Arabia. He is considered controversial by some for the topic of the religious sermons he has delivered and his connections to governments of Arab states of the Persian Gulf, including the United Arab Emirates, Qatar and Saudi Arabia, particularly the Imam Muhammad ibn Abd al-Wahhab Mosque. The Foundation for Defense of Democracies, The Daily Beast, and Foreign Policy magazine have run articles about Al-Ateeq, expressing concerns about his alleged fanaticism and fundamentalist hard-line views. Foreign Policy has even compiled extensive documentation of his government-sponsored activities.

One of Al-Ateeq's lectures at A Dhi al-Nurayn Mosque in 2005 was promoted by the Saudi Arabian government's official press agency.

In 2010, during Ramadan, the Ministry of Awqaf and Islamic Affairs (Qatar) invited Sa'ad Ateeq al-Ateeq to give sermons. In May 2011, the Ministry of Awqaf and Islamic Affairs (Qatar) again asked Sa'ad Ateeq al-Ateeq for sermons. One of his sermons is listed in the media section of the Ministry of Awqaf and Islamic Affairs (Qatar) website.

Sa'ad al-Ateeq serves as a preacher and Imam at The King Khalid Military College Mosque. In December 2010, he preached a sermon to the King Saud University students.

During a sermon at Qatar's Imam Muhammad ibn Abd al-Wahhab Mosque (Grand Mosque of Qatar), Sa'ad Ateeq called for the ultimate victory of Muslims and Islam while referring to the end of Jews and Christians as determined by God.

Sa'ad Ateeq al-Ateeq was invited to deliver a sermon to Qatari airport security on July 23, 2013, in Doha, Qatar, by the Ministry of Interior. Additionally, he delivered a religious sermon to the Qatari Navy in July 2013.

The Facilities Security Force of the Ministry of Interior (Saudi Arabia) hosted a lecture by Al-Ateeq on September 23, 2013.

On October 2, 2013, at the Imam Muhammad ibn Abd al-Wahhab Mosque, Sa'ad Ateeq al-Ateeq reiterated his call for the supremacy of Muslims and Islam, alongside the destruction of Christians and Jews.

In February 2014, the Ministry of Awqaf and Islamic Affairs (Qatar) tweeted another sermon by al-Ateeq at the Imam Muhammad ibn Abd al-Wahhab Mosque.

On February 26, 2014, Al-Ateeq delivered a lecture titled With Beloved Muhammad at a Qur'an schools exhibition where school children were present.

On July 6, 2014, al-Ateeq preached at the Imam Muhammad ibn Abd al-Wahhab Mosque. On July 9, 2014, al-Ateeq gave another Ramadan sermon at the Imam Muhammad ibn Abd al-Wahhab Mosque. In July 2014, Al-Ateeq was invited to deliver a speech at the Dubai International Holy Quran Award, an event organized by Sheikh Mohammed bin Rashid Al Maktoum, the Ruler of Dubai. Al-Ateeq participation as a preacher and scholar in the event was mentioned on Sheikh Mohammed bin Rashid Al Maktoum's website At the event, he delivered his speech.

In January 2015, Sa'ad Ateeq al-Ateeq made a controversial statement calling for the destruction of Shias, Christians, Nusayris (Alawites), and Jews while emphasizing that Muslims and Islam be exalted in Qatar's Imam Muhammad ibn Abd al-Wahhab Mosque. These statements were promoted on the website and the official Twitter account of the Ministry of Awqaf and Islamic Affairs (Qatar) Al-Ateeq himself promoted his January 2015 sermon at the Imam Muhammad ibn Abd al-Wahhab Mosque on his Twitter account.

In March 2015, al-Ateeq repeated his calls for the destruction of "Rafidah" Shia, "Nusayri" (Alawites), Christians, and Jews in Sudan. He also emphasized the upliftment of Muslims and the Significance of Islam. Focusing more on Quran, the reader is asked that if he wants to find more information about Him (Allah), he will need to approach a Bakhabar or Illamwala (i.e. a complete scholar). Quoting Quran Sharif- Surat Al Furqan 25:59 here,

"He who created the heavens and the earth and what is between Sky and Earth in six days and then established Himself above the Throne - the Most Merciful [Kabir], so ask about Him one well informed."

Al-Ateeq delivered a speech at King Khaled Mosque, which had been promoted through the official Twitter account associated with the Mosque host..
