= Abdulla Bin Zaid Al Mahmoud Islamic Cultural Center =

Mosque in Doha, Qatar

- الفنار، المركز الثقافي الإسلامي القطري
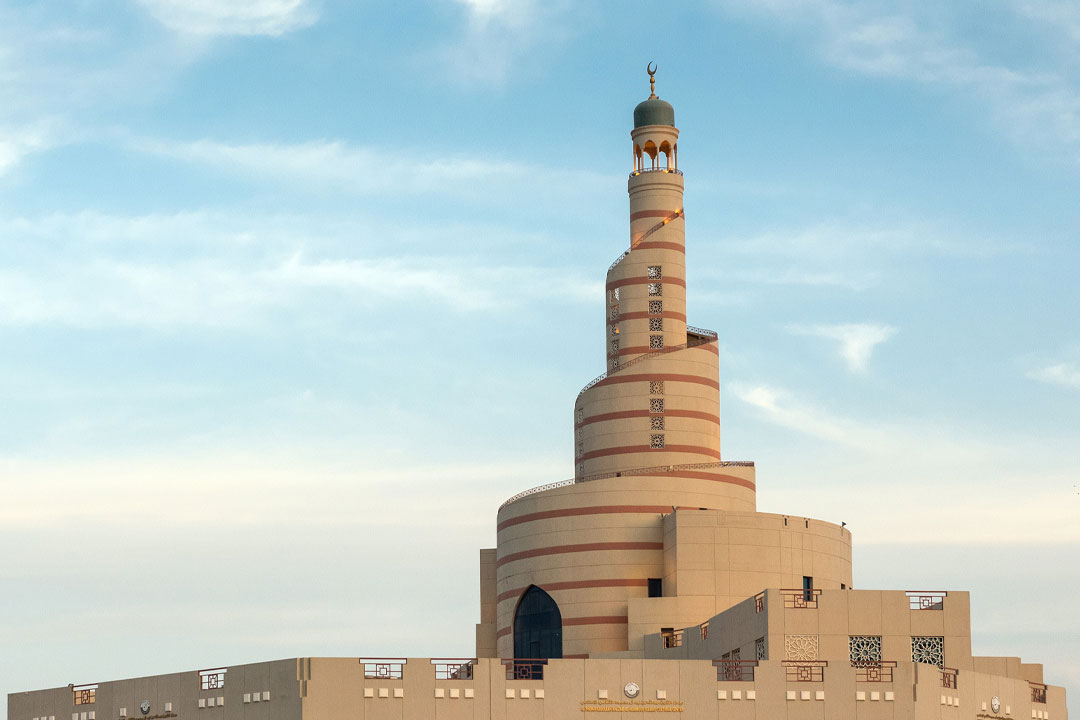
- The center in 2023

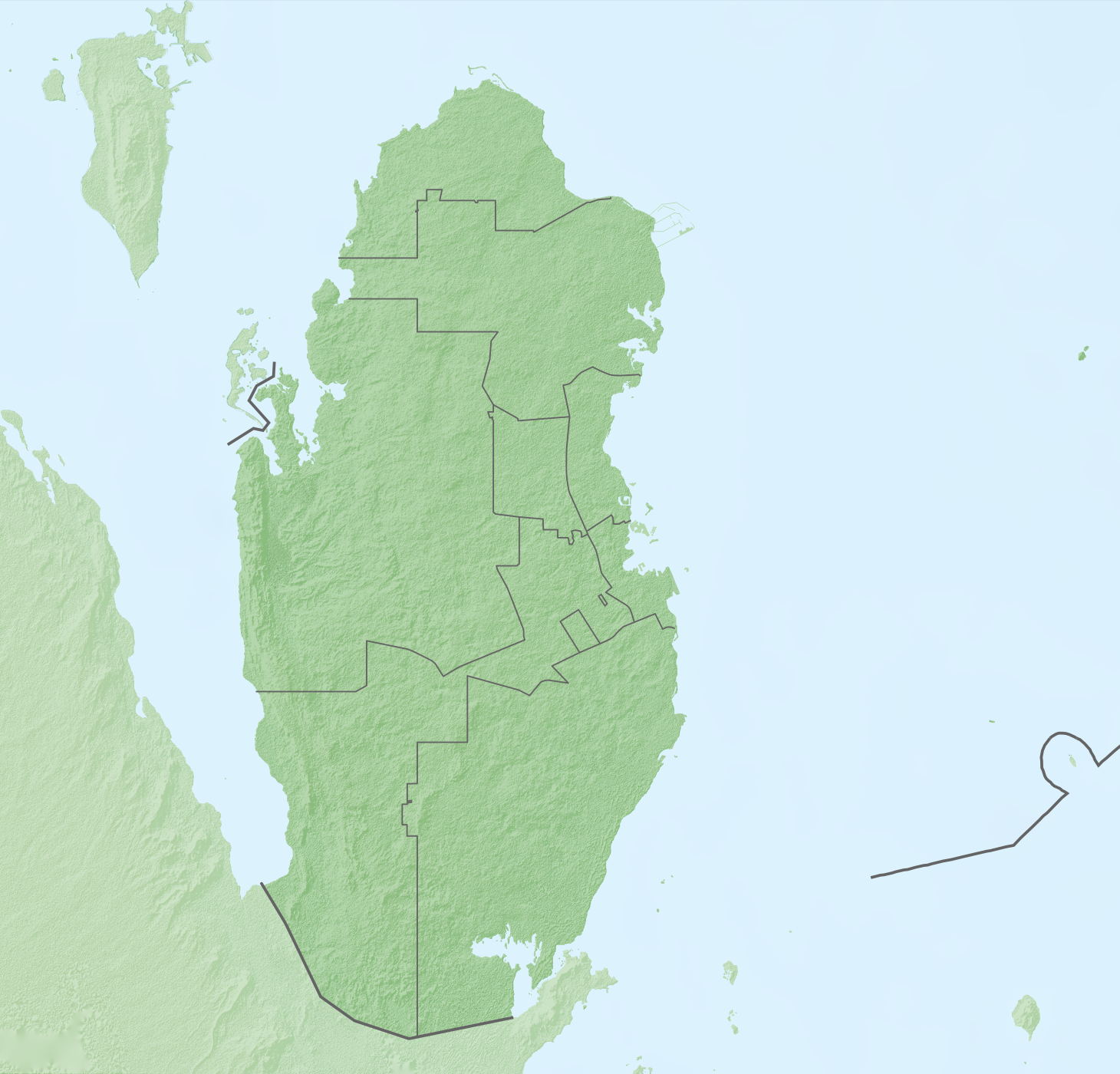
- Location of the mosque and cultural center in Qatar

Religion
- Affiliation: Islam
- Ecclesiastical or organisational status: Mosque and cultural center
- Status: Active

Location
- Location: Al Souq, Doha Municipality, Doha
- Country: Qatar
- Interactive map of Abdulla Bin Zaid Al Mahmoud Islamic Cultural Center
- Coordinates: 25°10′19″N 51°19′43″E

Architecture
- Type: Mosque architecture
- Style: Qatari
- Completed: 2008

Specifications
- Minaret: One: spiral
- Materials: Bricks; mortar

Website
- fanar.gov.qa

The Abdulla Bin Zaid Al Mahmoud Islamic Cultural Center (Arabic: الفنار، المركز الثقافي الإسلامي القطري), commonly known simply as Bin Zaid, and also known previously as Fanar or Qatar Islamic Culture Center and Spiral Mosque, is a mosque and cultural center, located in Doha Municipaltiy, in Doha, the capital of Qatar. It is located close to Doha Corniche and is a prominent landmark in the city.

The center's most distinguished feature is its mosque which has a unique minaret design impressed by Great Mosque of Samarra. Prior to 2009, the mosque was the largest in the country, superseded by Imam Muhammad ibn Abd al-Wahhab Mosque. However, it remains the tallest mosque in Qatar.

== History ==
The mosque was named after the famous Qatari Islamic scholar and the founder of the Qatari judicial system Sheikh Abdulla bin Zaid Al-Mahmoud. The name was given by the Emir of Qatar to commemorate his achievements as the supreme judge of Qatar.

Qatari Prime Minister Hamad bin Jassim bin Jaber Al Thani officially inaugurated the center during a public ceremony held on 12 January 2008.

== Activities ==
The Fanar Culture Center is involved in several social, religious and educational activities. In addition to hosting one of the largest mosques in Qatar, the center also publishes religious studies and provides lessons in Arabic and Islam. The center also houses a library. The mosque is a popular tourist attraction and allows entry for non-Muslims.

== Architecture ==
Traditional Qatari mosques were made of coral rock, mud and wood. Mosques from the 21st century are built of brick and mortar. These materials now allow the construction of high domes, replacing the flat roofs. Moreover, traditional mosques featured courtyards, which are rarely seen in modern mosques. Finally, the traditional outdoor "mothawaddah" in the form of a pool has been replaced with wash basins and running water.

== See also ==
- Islam in Qatar
- List of mosques in Qatar
