= Ghanem bin Shaheen bin Ghanem Al Ghanim =

Qatari politician

Minister of Endowments and Islamic Affairs
- Incumbent
- Assumed office 19 October 2021
- Monarch: Tamim bin Hamad Al Thani
- Prime Minister: Khalid bin Khalifa bin Abdul Aziz Al Thani
- Preceded by: Gaith bin Mubarak Al Kuwari

Personal details
- Education: Royal Military Academy Sandhurst

Ghanem bin Shaheen bin Ghanem Al Ghanim is the Qatari Minister of Endowments and Islamic Affairs. He was appointed as Minister on 19 October 2021.

== Education ==
Al Ghanim holds a degree from the Royal Military Academy Sandhurst and a Bachelor in Aeronautics (1978). He is a fellow of the Pakistani Air War College.

== Career ==
Until 1997, Al Ghanim was Director of Air Operations in Qatar Armed Forces. From 1999 until 2013, he worked as Assistant Chief of Staff for Operations and Training at the General Command of the Armed Forces. In 2013, he was appointed Chief of Staff of the Qatar Armed Forces. In addition, Al Ghanim served as Lieutenant General of the Qatar Armed Forces from 2016 until 2021.

Previously he had served in the Qatar Armed Forces as the Commander of the Air Operations Center, the Commander of the Air Defense Command, the Operations Commander of the Doha International Air Base and the Commander of the 7th Squadron of the Mirage-F1.

Since 19 October 2021, Al Ghanim has been Minister of Endowments and Islamic Affairs.
