= Qatari Almanac =

Reference book

- Cover of the 1965 Qatari Almanac
- Author: Abdullah Ibrahim Al-Ansari
- Language: Arabic
- Genre: Almanacs
- Published: 1957
- Publication place: Qatar
- Media type: Print

The Qatari Almanac (Arabic: التقويم القطري, romanized: al-Taqwīm al-Qaṭari) was an annual almanac authored by religious scholar Sheikh Abdullah Ibrahim Al-Ansari that integrated traditional and astronomical knowledge, offering invaluable insights into prayer timings, seasonal weather patterns, and local celestial navigation across the Persian Gulf region. Following his father's legacy, Al-Ansari published the almanac since 1957–58, incorporating knowledge from ancient Arabic texts and almanacs, including one from 1906 by Sheikh Abdulaziz bin Abdullah Al-Uyuni of Al Hasa, which he republished in 1960 under Emir Ali bin Abdullah Al Thani's sponsorship. It was the most widely disseminated almanac among the Arab states of the Persian Gulf. In 1966, the almanac was formally declared as the official calendar of Qatar by Emir Ahmad bin Ali Al Thani.

The Qatari Almanac integrated formal astronomical knowledge with local time-keeping systems. It featured charts detailing the zodiacal months, lunar stations, planets, the lunar Hijri and Christian solar calendars, shadow lengths for calculating prayer times, and the navigational system based on Canopus, among other data. It also offered insights into the distances between Doha and other Qatari towns in kilometers and included poetry and sayings reflecting traditional knowledge of environmental shifts with each season.

== History ==
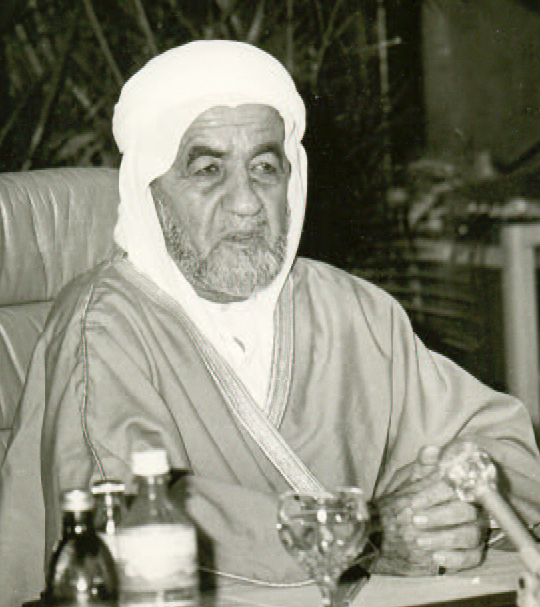
Sheikh Abdullah Ibrahim Al Ansari

Sheikh Abdullah Ibrahim Al-Ansari was born in Qatar in 1919. After initially making a career of pearl hunting, Al-Ansari received a religious education in Saudi Arabia before returning to his home country and establishing the first religious institute in 1954. He would start publishing his almanac a few years later through Al Urouba Press. He was later given a governmental position, being named the Director of the Office for the Revival of Islamic Heritage. He showed a great interest in the Islamic calendar and time-keeping systems, and in 1957–58, took over the publication of the Qatari Almanac from his father Ibrahim Al-Ansari. The almanac would continue being regularly published on an annual basis until Sheikh Al-Ansari died in 1989.

According to researcher Daniel Varisco in 1990, "[...] the Qatari Almanac has become a standard source for much of the Gulf. Indeed, it is difficult to find an informant in Qatar who is not familiar with the almanac." Throughout the 1970s and 1980s, Al-Ansari published specialized almanacs for Mecca, Medina and the capital cities of the Persian Gulf countries.

Following Al-Ansari's death in 1989, his son, Mohammed bin Abdullah Al-Ansari, took over the publication of the Qatari Almanac. He also established the Qatari Calendar House in 1990. In more recent times, the Ministry of Awqaf and Islamic Affairs has assumed control of the Qatari Almanac's publication.

== Contents ==
Al-Ansari's work not only aligned the Hijri calendar with the zodiac but also preserved a treasure trove of star lore dating back to the pre-Islamic period in the Arabian Peninsula, encapsulated in a genre known as anwa. One of the seminal texts in this tradition was the Kitab al-Anwa' by Ibn Qutayba, who provided extensive descriptions of Arabic star names, traditional meteorological beliefs, and seasonal characteristics.

Most importantly, the almanac chronicled the practical use of shadow lengths to determine prayer times before the advent of modern clocks, a method still observable in many older mosques. The almanac also described local seasonal terminologies and the significant navigational and pastoral practices dictated by the stars, such as the rising of Canopus marking the onset of autumn rains and pastoral migrations. Al-Ansari notes six separate seasons, each spanning two months in length: wasmi (corresponding to autumn rains), shita (winter), rabi (winter to spring), sayf (spring), hamim (early summer), and khareef (late summer to early autumn). Al-Ansari's method of classifying the seasons soon became commonplace, appearing in Saudi Arabian and other Arab almanacs.

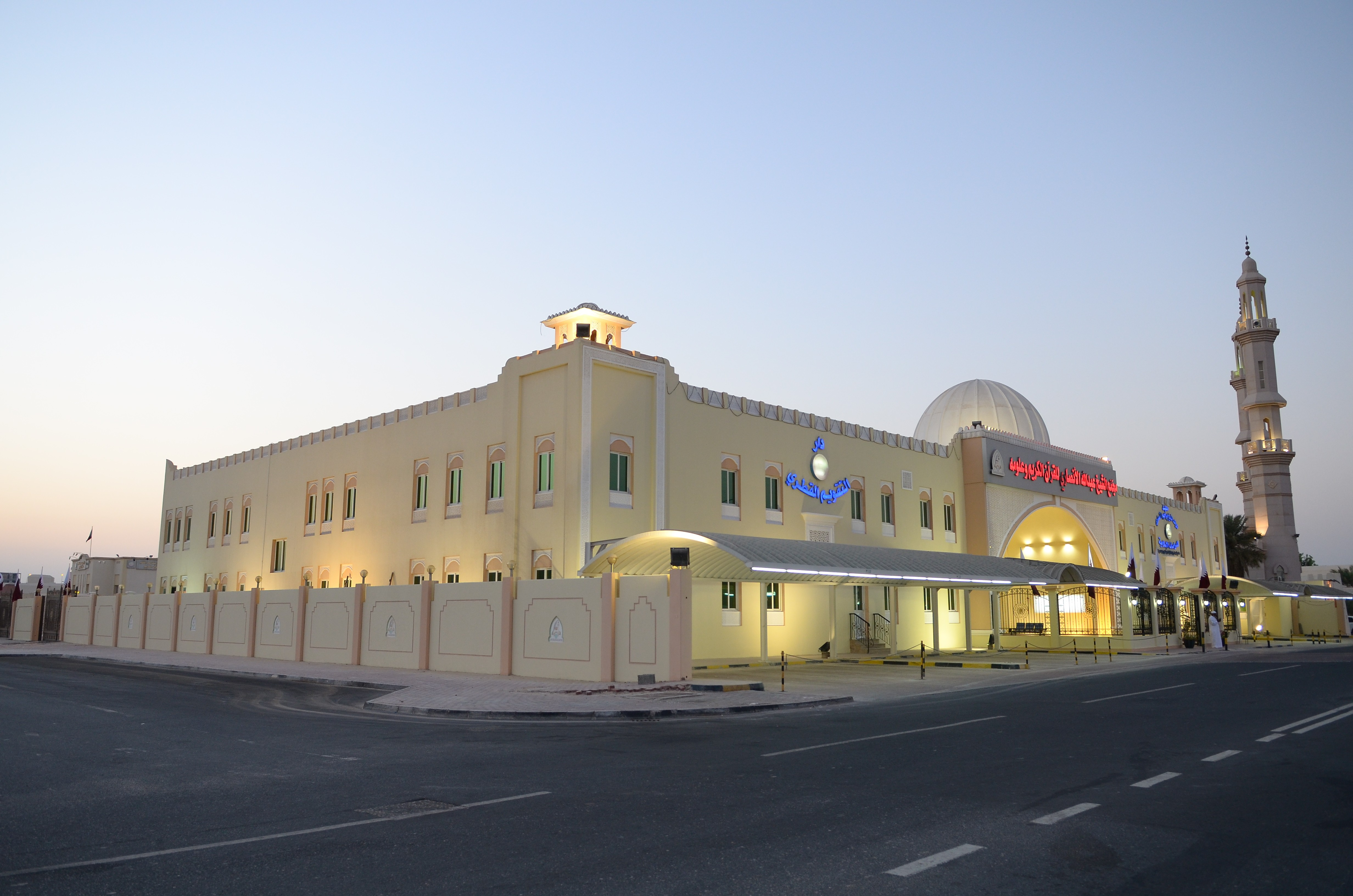
Sheikh Abdullah Al Ansari complex

As modern methods of timekeeping became more prevalent, the almanac was made redundant.

== Legacy ==
The Sheikh Abdullah Al Ansari Complex for the Holy Quran and Science was opened over a 5,000 square meter area in Hazm Al Markhiya, Doha in 2014. Containing many religious and literary works, the complex hosts the Qatari Calendar House, the Center for Islamic Studies, and the Sheikh Al-Ansari Library.
