= Iftar Cannon =

Cannon shot to mark the end of fasting during Ramadan

An Ordnance QF 25-pounder used as the Iftar Cannon at the Sheikh Zayed Grand Mosque in Abu Dhabi

The Iftar Cannon (Arabic: مدفع الافطار, romanized: Madfa al-ifṭār; Turkish: iftar topu, lit. 'cannon for breaking the fast'), also known as Ramadan Cannon, is a long-held Ramadan tradition that began in Egypt and spread to large parts of the Islamic world; every evening upon the sunset call to prayer (maghrib adhan), a cannon fires a single shot to notify people of the start of Iftar in Ramadan, when Muslims get to break their day-long fasting as the sun sets. The blast of the cannon was first used to inform the entire city of the time of Iftar, before the invention of accurate clocks and mass media; it no longer serves its main purpose but rather is a symbolic tradition. However in Turkey, some people still rely on the sound to break their fasts, but recently in some cities, a sound bomb is used instead of a canon.

== History ==
Dubai Police fire the Iftar Cannon by Burj Khalifa

Though it is practiced today in most parts of the Muslim world as a tradition, the blast of the cannon was first used pragmatically to inform the entire city of the time of Iftar, before the invention of accurate clocks and mass media. The cannon is first fired to herald the beginning of the holy month of Ramadan, and then each day to announce the breaking of the fast at the sunset prayers of Maghrib.

A common account places the origin of the custom in the 19th century, during the reign of Ottoman governor of Egypt Muhammad Ali. Other historians trace the tradition to the Mamluk ruler Sayf ad-Din Khushqadam in the 15th century. The practice has been recorded in Istanbul since at least 1852.

The practice has spread throughout the Muslim world in the past century. It was adopted by the Saudi state following their conquest of the holy cities of Mecca and Medina in the 1920s, and introduced in Sharjah and Dubai in the mid-20th century. Various designs of Ramadan cannon are used, ranging from purpose-built blank-firing devices to conventional artillery guns, such as the British QF 25-pound howitzer used in the United Arab Emirates. An American 75 mm M1916 howitzer, gifted to the local Muslim authorities by the British Army, is used in Jerusalem. In Cairo, a German Krupp 75 mm field gun is used. This is nicknamed "al-ḥājja Fāṭima", after Sayf ad-Din Khushqadam's wife.

During the 2026 Iran war, an Iftar cannon in Dubai, United Arab Emirates, caused panic as it was mistaken for an attack.

== Other countries ==
- Bahrain - 3 cannons are located in Bahrain, which are usually fired daily at the Riffa Fort (Video), Arad Fort and The Avenues, Bahrain.
- Jordan - The ifar cannons are fired at the Al Nakheel Square in Amman.
- Kuwait - Naif Palace
- Qatar - Cannons are placed at Souq Waqif, Katara, Muhammad Ibn Abdulwahhab Grand Mosque, and Souq Al Wakrah, under supervision of the Qatari Armed Forces.
- Saudi Arabia - Several cannons are located in Saudi Arabia, especially in the Hejaz region cities such as Mecca, Jeddah and Medina.
- Syria - The Syrian Army revived the ifar cannon firing tradition at the Tomb of the Unknown Soldier Square in Damascus after the Syrian civil war.
- Turkey - Iftar cannons are fired all over Turkey. Famously in Istanbul, in the Sultanahmet Square. (Video) It is sometimes accompanied by the Mehter band. Recently in some cities, a sound bomb is used instead of a canon.
- UAE - The first cannon was fired in Sharjah in the 19th century under the rule of Sultan bin Saqr Al Qasimi. Each emirate now fires at least one cannon, with the three most populous (Abu Dhabi, Dubai, and Sharjah) hosting several sites throughout their cities.
- Yemen - The sound of the Iftar Cannon was once heard over the capital Sana'a, though with the ongoing civil war it is not sure if this practice continues.
