= Ministry of Awqaf and Islamic Affairs (Qatar) =

Qatar government ministry of religious affairs

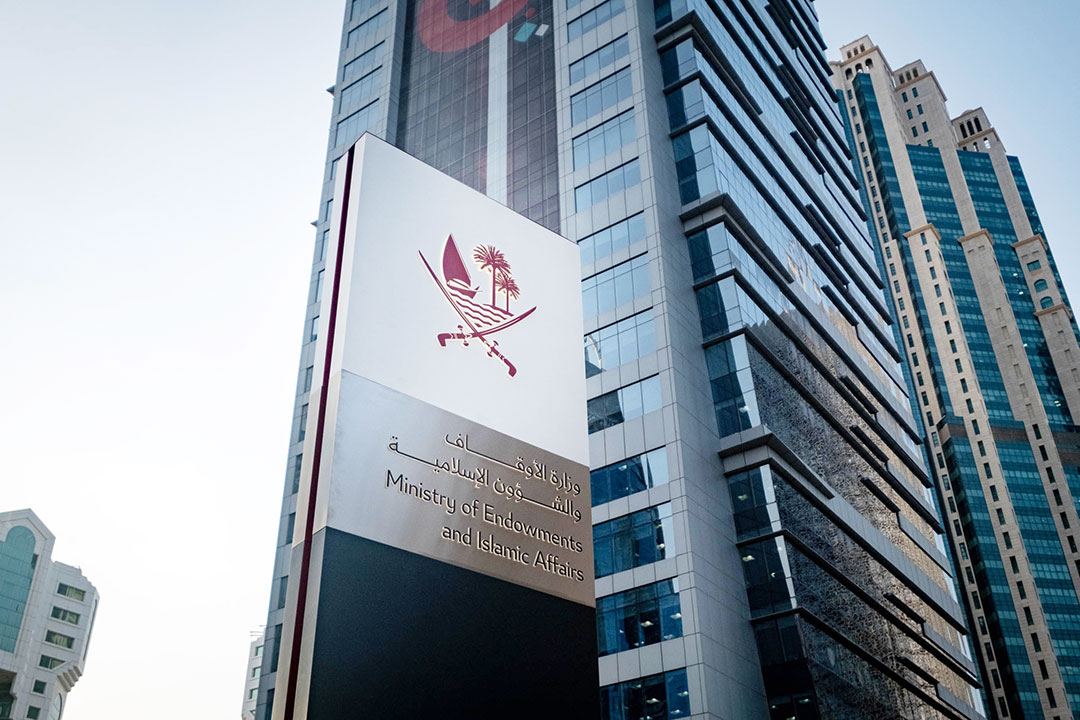
Ministry of Awqaf and Religious Affairs headquarters in Doha.

The Qatari Ministry of Endowments and Islamic Affairs is a Qatari government ministry responsible for managing Islamic religious endowments and overseeing mosques and related religious services. Its responsibilities include providing Islamic religious education, managing zakat funds and dealing with matters relating to the Hajj pilgrimage.

The current minister is Ghanem bin Shaheen bin Ghanem Al Ghanim, who was appointed in October 2021.

== History and mission ==
The Ministry of Endowments and Islamic Affairs traces its institutional origins to the Department of Endowment Affairs, established in 1978. The department was restructured as the Ministry of Endowments and Islamic Affairs in 1992. Ghanem bin Shaheen bin Ghanem Al Ghanim has served as its minister since October 2021. The ministry oversees religious endowments and provides religious services across Qatar.

The ministry's mission includes collecting donations, increasing awareness and practice of Islam amongst Muslims and non-Muslims, supporting Islamic clergy, and building and maintaining mosques. "Its vision is to build a contemporary Islamic society along with fostering the Sharee'ah and cultural heritage". It also oversees the Zakat Fund, including the collection and distribution of Zakat payments. Through its Department of Hajj and Umrah Affairs, the ministry provides pilgrims with information and administrative services, including registration for the Hajj.

== Research and scholarship ==
The Ministry also supports Islamic research and scholarship through the Sheikh Ali bin Abdullah Al Thani Endowment Peer-Reviewed Research Award, administered by its Department of Islamic Research and Studies. The award promotes academic research on contemporary Islamic issues and includes international and local categories.

== Islamic Cultural Center ==
Many of the Ministry's missions are carried out through the Qatar Islamic Cultural Center. The center is also known as Abdulla Bin Zaid Al Mahmoud Islamic Cultural Center (formerly known as Fanar, which translates to "lighthouse"). The name was chosen in reference to the center's missions to "act as a guiding light to mankind".

Abdulla Bin Zaid Al Mahmoud Islamic Cultural Center's Education Center offers courses in Arabic as a foreign language, Shariah Law and Islamic arts and calligraphy. It also delivers Introduction to Islam classes in a number of different languages, including Filipino, Sri Lankan, Nepali and English.

The center also publishes the Muslim lifestyle magazine Baseera, distributes free Islamic books in multiple languages and live-streams English-language sermons online every Friday.

== Islamweb ==
Islamweb is a Qatar-based, state-sponsored digital fatwa institution serving both local and international audiences. It provides religious guidance and fatwas on a range of Islamic, social, and everyday issues. It enables AWQAFM to broadcast web-based information with articles, Quran recitations, Q&A information, fatwas, lectures and fiqh.

== Qatari Almanac ==
First published in 1957–58 by Sheikh Abdullah bin Ibrahim Al Ansari, the Qatari Almanac is an annual almanac offering insights into prayer timings, seasonal weather patterns, and local celestial navigation across the Persian Gulf region. After Al-Ansari's death in 1989, the Ministry took over the publication of the almanac due to its importance in defining the proper time for acts of worship and Islamic holidays.

== Investments ==
The Ministry has invested heavily in the construction of the cultural center and a large number of mosques, but also holds shares in various Qatari corporations including Al Jazeera Finance, a Sharia-compliant financial institution established in 1989.

== Controversy ==
Former minister Mohammad Abd al-Latif al-Mana was dismissed from the cabinet in 2005 following allegations that he had been involved in the illegal trading of Qatar Natural Gas Transport Company shares. Mohammad Abd al-Latif al-Mana was also a co-founder of Retaj Marketing and Project Management in which the Ministry still owns a 20% stake.

The Ministry of Awqaf and Islamic Affairs has solicited the radical Sa'ad Ateeq al-Ateeq on several occasions. On Ramadan in 2010 and in May 2011, the Ministry invited al-Ateeq to give sermons. In February 2014 the Ministry tweeted that the Imam Muhammad ibn Abd al-Wahhab Mosque was hosting another sermon by al-Ateeq. One of his sermons is listed on the media section of the ministry's website. Sa'ad Ateeq al-Ateeq has called for the destruction of Shias, Christians, Nusayris (Alawites), and Jews, and called for Muslims and Islam to be exalted, in Qatar's Imam Muhammad ibn Abd al-Wahhab Mosque in January 2015. This was advertised on the website of the Ministry of Awqaf and Islamic Affairs and on the official Twitter account of the Ministry of Awqaf and Islamic Affairs.
