= Qatar State Mosque =

Mosque in Doha, Qatar

- مسجد دولة قطر
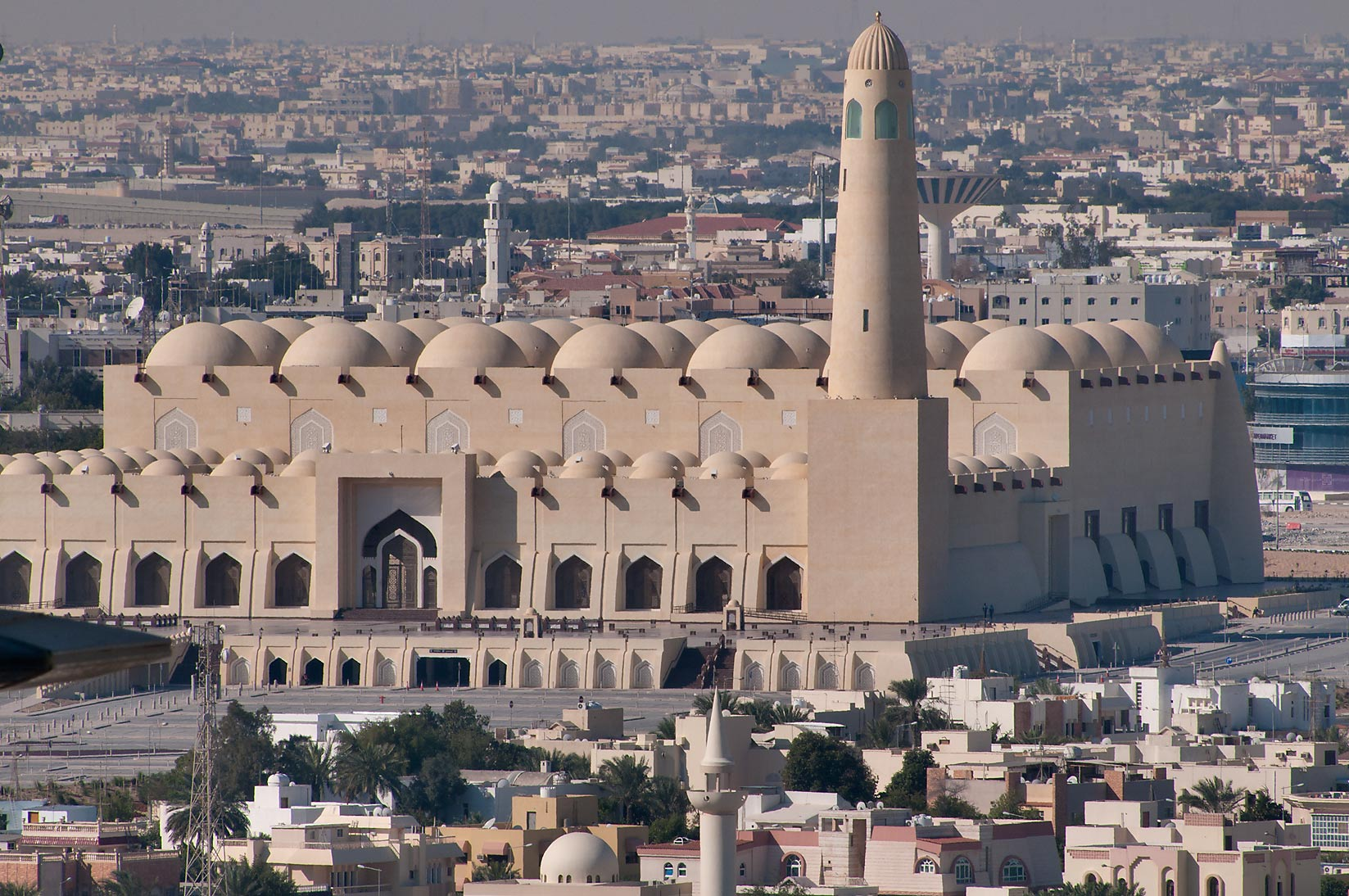

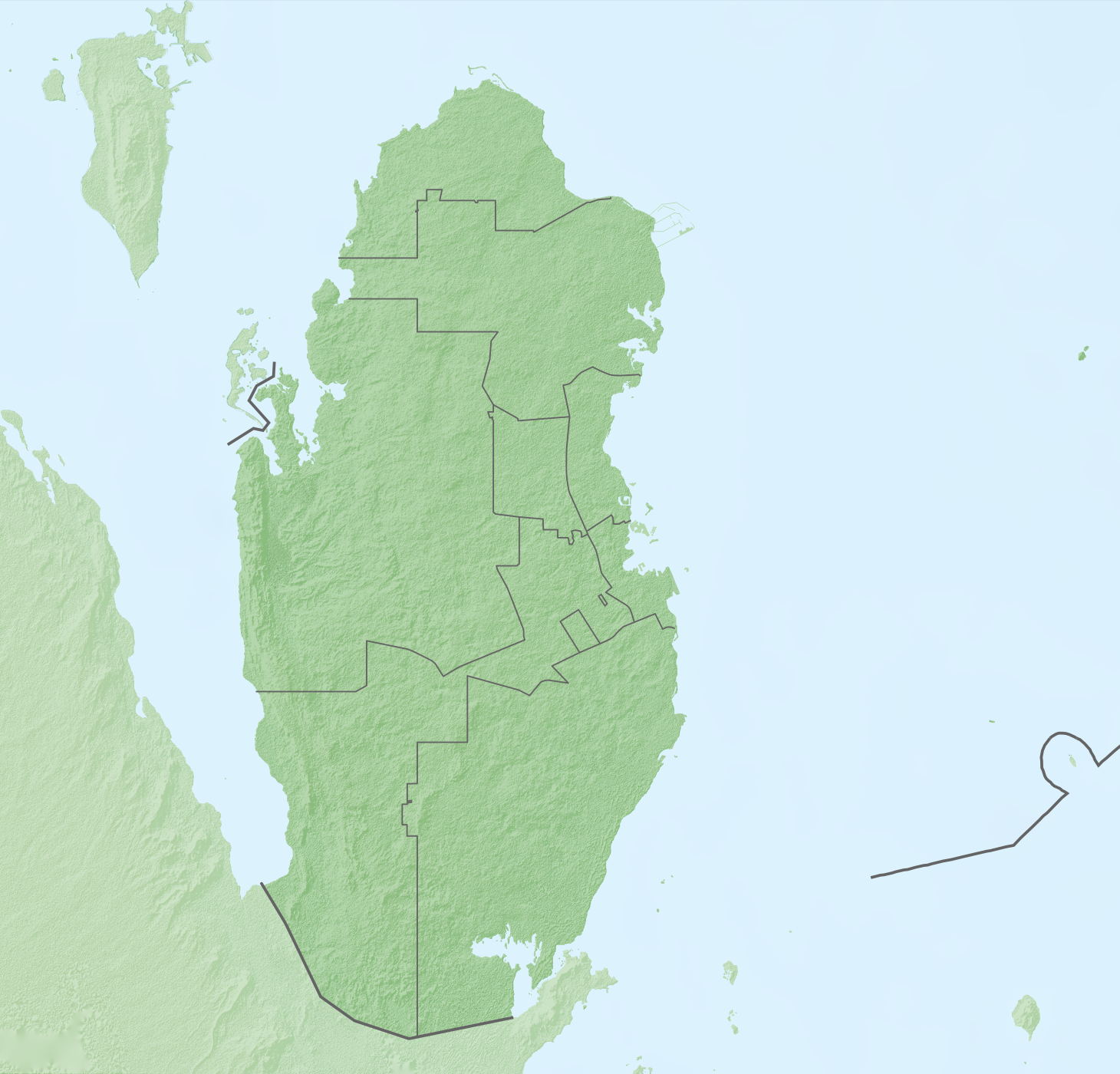
- Location of the mosque in Qatar

Religion
- Affiliation: Sunni Islam
- Sect: Salafi
- Ecclesiastical or organisational status: Mosque
- Status: Active

Location
- Location: Lejbailat, Doha
- Country: Qatar
- Interactive map of Qatar State Mosque
- Coordinates: 25°19′1.7″N 51°30′18.2″E

Architecture
- Type: Mosque architecture
- Style: Traditional Arab
- Completed: 2011

Specifications
- Capacity: 30,000 worshippers
- Interior area: 175,164 m^{2} (1,885,450 sq ft)
- Dome: 96
- Minaret: One
- Materials: Sandstone; copper; marble

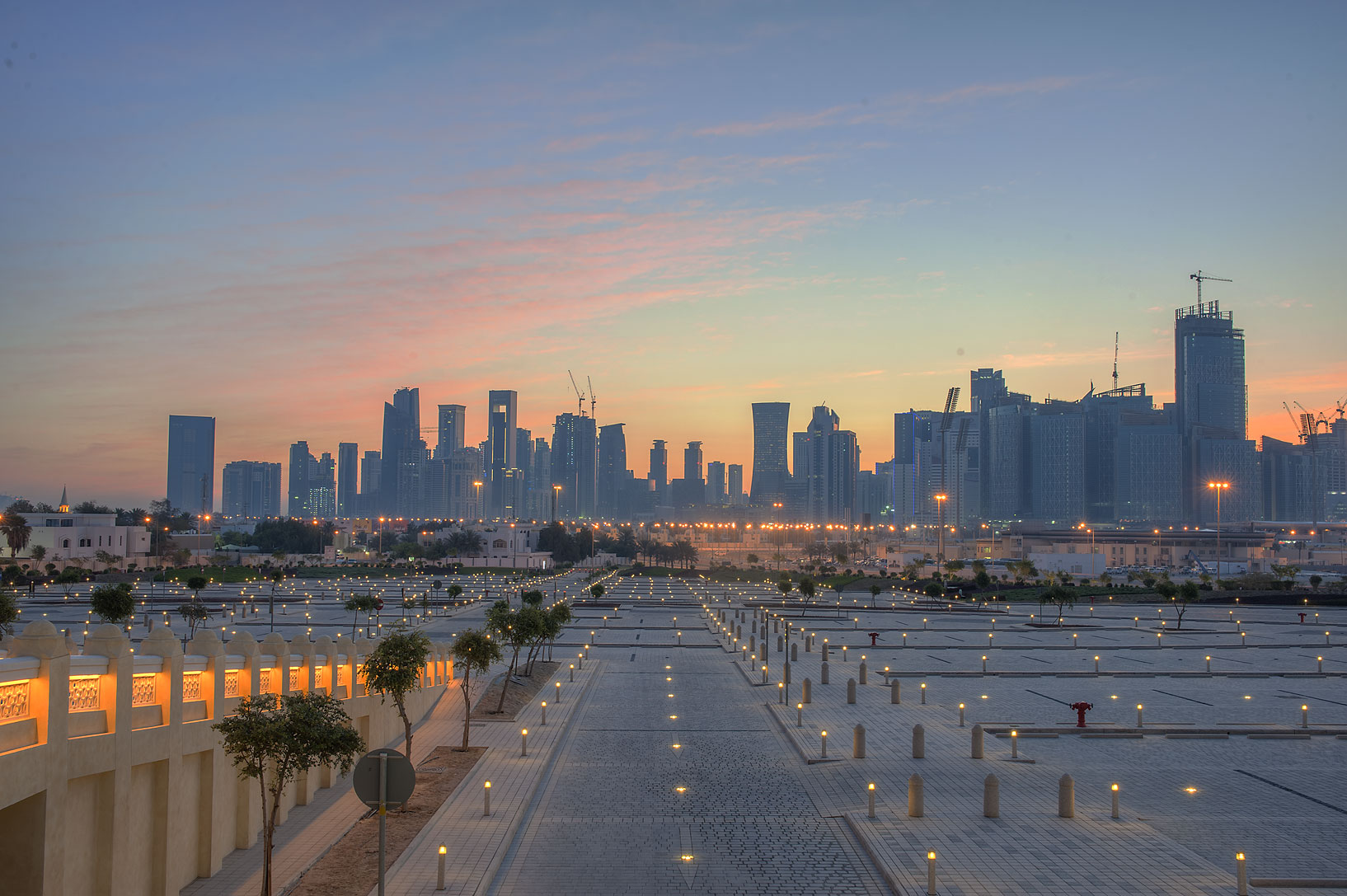
Parking lot for Imam Muhammad ibn Abd al-Wahhab Mosque with West Bay skyline in background

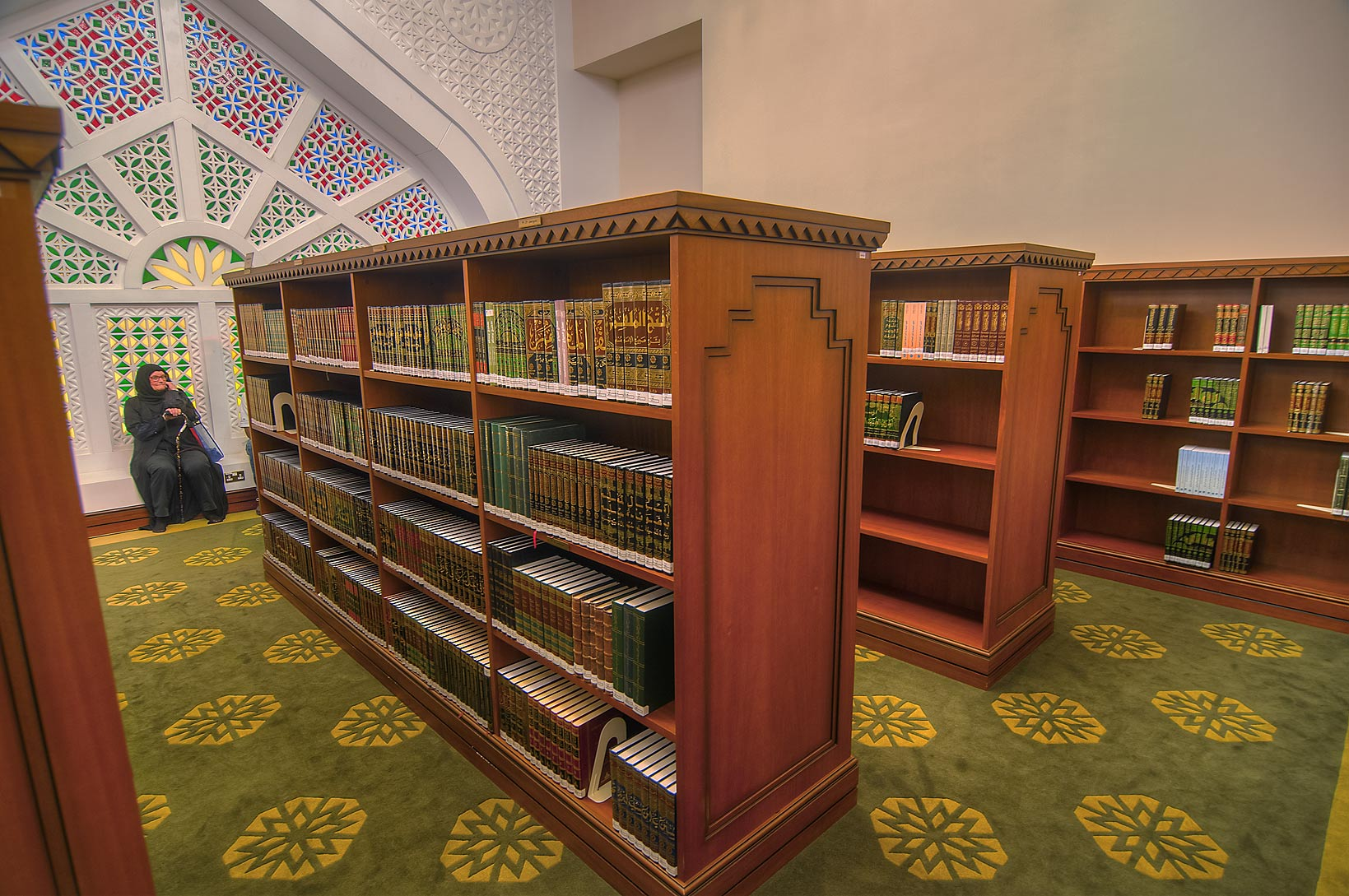
Bookshelves in the mosque's library

Qatar State Mosque (Arabic: مسجد دولة قطر), also known as the Muhammad ibn Abd al-Wahhab Mosque and the Grand Mosque of Doha, is the national mosque of Qatar. It is located in the Lejbailat district of the capital Doha.

The mosque was renamed after Muhammad ibn Abd al-Wahhab, an 18th-century scholar and founder of the Wahhabi movement.

== Architecture ==
The mosque is built in traditional Arab style with modern features. Spanning an area of 175,164 square metres (1,885,450 sq ft), the mosque features a centrally air-conditioned hall where up to 11,000 men can comfortably participate in prayers. Additionally, an enclosure adjacent to the central hall accommodates 1,200 women. The mosque boasts three primary entrances and 17 side entrances. The central hall is adorned with 28 large domes, while the outer quadrangle is crowned with 65 domes. On the whole, the mosque can hold a congregation of 30,000 people. The mosque building is divided horizontally starting from the eastern side, ascending towards the Qiblah to the outer courtyard, the arcades, the inner courtyard "the mosque courtyard" and finally the prayer hall "the prayer hall". The total built-up area of the mosque building reaches 19,565 square metres (210,600 sq ft), while the outer courtyard extends over 14,953 square metres (160,950 sq ft), and connects the level of external facilities with the level of the mosque courtyard via steps and ramps for people with special needs from the three sides. The mosque includes ablution areas for men and women. The design of water services was inspired by the design of one of the traditional freshwater resources in Qatar.

The mosque is illuminated and decorated by 28 multi-layered circular copper chandeliers suspended 14 metres (46 ft) high. The audio systems are highly advanced, self-controlled and directed, to reduce and process the echo of sound to the lowest possible level. The mosque also includes a fixed network of cameras that provide live television broadcasting faster and easier at any time. The mosque's parking spaces can accommodate approximately 3,000 cars, whether in open or covered areas. The mosque is surrounded by a green belt of trees covering 47,362 square metres (509,800 sq ft). Polished earth-colored marble covers the floor of the mosque's courtyard and arcades, while the arcades are shaded by 65 small domes from which copper chandeliers hang, illuminating the arcades at night. The four windows on the southern wall are centered on the mihrab and the pulpit. The height of the mihrab from the inside is 11 metres (36 ft) and is covered with white marble, with the name of Allah in the middle of its upper part. The mihrab is decorated from the outside with two small domes, bringing the number of domes in the mosque to 96 domes, including the domes of the prayer hall, the arcades, the mihrab, and the dome of the minaret.

== Controversy ==
The mosque was opened in 2011, with the Emir of Qatar, Hamad bin Khalifa Al Thani, presiding over the occasion. In 2012, the mosque banned children from entering the mosque during tarawih prayers in the month of Ramadhan. This resulted in parents arguing with security staff.

A female worshiper accompanying a toddler complained that they were turned away from sunset prayers (when the mosque was fairly empty). When she protested, she was offered a prayer rug and shown to a corner near the ablution room, but was still not allowed to go upstairs to pray. Male worshipers had similar complaints.

In 2013 the ban was reinstated, causing further outrage among mosque attendees.

Mohamad al-Arefe said that Syria jihad is incumbent and did apologia for the militant Islamist group al-Nusra Front, visiting the Imam Muhammad ibn Abd al-Wahhab Mosque.

Zaghloul El-Naggar engaged in 9/11 denial and spoke twice in the Imam Muhammad ibn Abd al-Wahhab Mosque.

In a Sermon at Imam Muhammad ibn Abd al-Wahhab Mosque, Sa'ad Ateeq al-Ateeq delivered a sermon, calling for the end of Jews and Christians by the hands of God and called for Muslims and Islam to be exalted by God in February 2013. On 2 October 2013, at the Imam Muhammad ibn Abd al-Wahhab Mosque, Sa'ad Ateeq al-Ateeq again called for the destruction of Christians and Jews and called for Muslims and Islam to be exalted. In February 2014, the Ministry of Awqaf and Islamic Affairs (Qatar) tweeted that the Imam Muhammad ibn Abd al-Wahhab Mosque was hosting another sermon by al-Ateeq. On 6 July 2014, during Ramadan, al-Ateeq preached at the Imam Muhammad ibn Abd al-Wahhab Mosque. On 9 July 2014 al-Ateeq also gave another Ramadan sermon at the Imam Muhammad ibn Abd al-Wahhab Mosque. Sa'ad Ateeq al-Ateeq has called for the destruction of Shias, Christians, Nusayris (Alawites), and Jews and called for Muslims and Islam to be exalted in the Imam Muhammad ibn Abd al-Wahhab Mosque in January 2015. This was advertised on the website of the Ministry of Awqaf and Islamic Affairs (Qatar) and on the official Twitter account of the Ministry of Awqaf and Islamic Affairs (Qatar) His January 2015 sermon in the Imam Muhammad ibn Abd al-Wahhab Mosque was advertised by al-Ateeq on his Twitter. The Foundation for Defense of Democracies, The Daily Beast, and Foreign Policy magazine have run articles on Al-Ateeq and his views, with Foreign Policy having compiled a large documentation of his government sponsored activities at this Mosque.

In 2017, there was a request published on the Saudi Arabian newspaper Okaz signed by 200 descendants of Ibn Abd al-Wahhab to change the name of the mosque, because according to their statement "it does not carry its true Salafi path", even though most Qataris adhere to the Salafi brand of Sunni Islam.
