= Asma Al-Rayyan =

German-Qatari human rights advocate and royal

Sheikha Asma Al-Rayyan
- Spouse: Sheikh Talal bin Abdelaziz Al Thani
- Issue: Sheikha Al-Anoud; Sheikha Al-Joharah; Sheikh Abdullah; Sheikh Ahmed
- House: Thani (by marriage)
- Religion: Islam
- Occupation: human rights activist

Sheikha Asma Al-Rayyan, also known as Asma Rayan and Asma Arian, is a German-Qatari human rights advocate and a member of the extended Qatari royal family. She is the wife of Sheikh Talal bin Abdelaziz bin Ahmed Al-Thani, a son of the former Crown Prince Abdelaziz bin Ahmed Al Thani. Since her husband, and nineteen other members of the Qatari royal family, were arrested in 2013 for opposing the diplomatic and economic policies of Emir Tamim bin Hamad Al Thani, Al-Rayyan has been an outspoken critic of the Emir and his government. Left impoverished after her husband was stripped of his inheritance and his assets were frozen, she took her children to Germany, where she is a citizen. Al-Rayyan is a supporter of public education and public healthcare and has given speeches advocating for the rights of Qatari women, children, and royal family members who oppose the Emir's government.

== Biography ==
Al-Rayyan married Sheikh Talal bin Abdul Aziz Al-Thani, a member of the Qatari royal family and the son of former Minister of Finance Sheikh Abdelaziz bin Ahmed Al Thani, in 2007. Her husband's grandfather was Sheikh Ahmad bin Ali Al Thani, who ruled as the Emir of Qatar from 1960 to 1972 until he was overthrown by his cousin, Sheikh Khalifa bin Hamad Al Thani. She and Sheikh Talal have four children: Sheikha Al-Anoud bin Talal bin Abdelaziz Al Thani, Sheikha Al-Joharah bin Talal bin Abdelaziz Al Thani, Sheikh Abdullah bin Talal bin Abdelaziz Al Thani, and Sheikh Ahmed bin Talal bin Abdelaziz Al Thani.

Al-Rayyan's father-in-law died in exile in Saudi Arabia in 2008. After his death, tensions rose between members of the royal family. Her husband's assets were frozen by the Qatari government and he was prevented from receiving his inheritance. Due to the block on their finances, her husband was imprisoned for not paying his debts in 2013 and was given a sentence of twenty-two years. He was one of twenty Qatari royals that were arrested by order of the Emir. Those arrested, supposedly for opposing economic and diplomatic policies in Qatar, were all related to Sheikh Abdullah bin Ali Al Thani, who was detained in the United Arab Emirates. Al-Rayyan stated that she believes her family is being punished as revenge for a generational family feud.

After her husband's arrest, the Qatari government forced Al-Rayyan and her children out of their home, without being allowed to take any of their belongings, and put them in makeshift housing built for FIFA workers. The house was poorly constructed over sewage water, had no air conditioning, and was infested with insects. Their assets were frozen and they were denied proper medical care. Al-Rayyan's children were denied transportation access and funds for their tuitions at German International School Doha, and were therefore unable to attend school. Al-Rayyan moved her children into a hotel after her son fell severely ill from the poor living conditions. She petitioned the government for proper housing and financial aid, but was denied. Al-Rayyed accused the Emir of human rights violations and of absolutism, claiming that the Qatari courts have no power. Al-Rayyan fled Qatar with her children, and brought them to her native Germany.

In 2019, Al-Rayyan testified before the Club Suisse de la Press in Geneva, accusing the Qatari government of denying her children their rights as members of the royal family. She also stated that 90-95% of Qatari citizens do not have proper living conditions and that preferential treatment is given to families who work for the government. Al-Rayyan advocated for public healthcare and public education in Qatar. She filed a complaint with the United Nations Commission on Human Rights and met with the Head of the Middle East Department, Muhammad al-Nsour, in Geneva.
