= 1996 Qatari coup attempt =

Failed coup d'état attempt

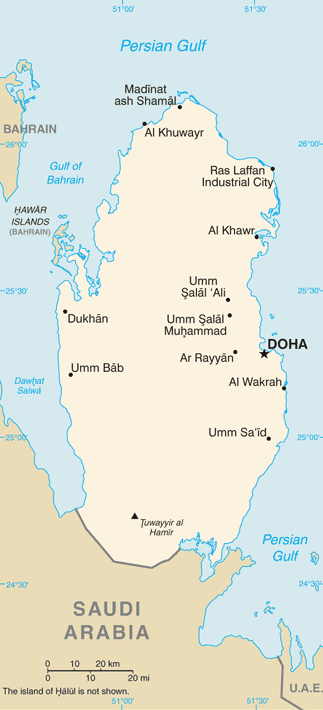
- A CIA WFB map of Qatar, not showing the Halul Island.
Date	14 February 1996
Location	Al Wajbah Palace, Al Rayyan, Qatar
Result	Coup attempt fails: Emir Hamad bin Khalifa Al Thani remains in power

Commanders and leaders
(Qatar) Hamad bin Jassim bin Hamad Al Thani	(Qatar) Hamad bin Khalifa Al Thani

Casualties and losses
- No casualties reported.

The 1996 Qatari coup d'état attempt was a failed coup against Emir Hamad bin Khalifa Al Thani (who had recently usurped the throne from his own father) that was foiled on the night of February 14, 1996, less than one year into Hamad bin Khalifa's reign. Qatari intelligence termed the coup attempt as "Operation Abu Ali".

More details regarding the coup were described in 2018 by an Al Jazeera documentary after the Qatar diplomatic crisis; accusing Bahrain, Egypt, Saudi Arabia, and United Arab Emirates of plotting to overthrow Hamad bin Khalifa Al Thani.

== Motivations ==
Crown Prince Hamad bin Khalifa Al Thani carried out a successful coup against his father Khalifa bin Hamad Al Thani on June 27, 1995, thereby formally becoming Emir of Qatar. The coup, enacted while Sheikh Khalifa was on a visit to Switzerland, was bloodless. In response to the transfer of power, Sheikh Khalifa called his son an "ignorant man" and proclaimed that he was still the legitimate ruler. Sheikh Khalifa was later offered refuge in the United Arab Emirates.

At the time, Hamad's coup was perceived by some as motivated by a desire for political liberalisation blocked by his father's regime. Later, Mehran Kamrava of Georgetown University in Qatar has suggested that Hamad's highly publicized campaign of supposed liberalisation was meant to help stabilize his new regime, especially through support from the West, and that once sufficient stabilization was achieved, the guise of domestic liberalisation was largely dropped. Although the Ministry of Information was abolished in 1998, for example, with the press occasionally allowed to criticize the economy or the status of foreign workers, journalists continue to face a "draconian system of censorship" in 2026.

== Coup d'état ==
=== Plot ===
Many high-ranking members of the Al Thani family who were still allies of the deposed emir organized a counter-coup to overthrow Emir Hamad. Qatar has claimed that the coup had foreign backing, mainly by the United Arab Emirates, Saudi Arabia, Egypt and Bahrain. A 1997 New York Times article stated that some unnamed western diplomats believed that the coup could have only been planned with knowledge and acquiescence from Saudi Arabia and United Arab Emirates.

In 2018, one year after the start of the Qatar diplomatic crisis, Al Jazeera reported apparent new details in a documentary regarding the operation accusing Saudi Arabia, Bahrain, Egypt, and the United Arab Emirates (UAE) of plotting to overthrow Hamad bin Khalifa Al Thani. According to the documentary, the crux of the operation would have seen armed men place Emir Hamad under house arrest at his residence off of Al Rayyan Road. This was originally planned to occur at 5 AM on February 16, but was changed to February 14 to reduce the chance of being discovered. According to Qatari intelligence, this change was at the behest of Mohamed bin Zayed Al Nahyan, who was then chief of the Emirati Armed Forces. Furthermore, Qatari intelligence documents claimed that, after assuming full command of Qatar's military facilities, the plotters would have sent for assistance to militias in Saudi Arabia. However, the coup was ultimately discovered and foiled before it could be carried out.

According to Al Jazeera, a former French army commander Paul Barril was contracted and supplied with weapons by the UAE to carry out the coup operation in Qatar. The Emirati minister of foreign affairs, Anwar Gargash, responded to the documentary, stating that Paul Barril was in fact a security agent of the Qatari Sheikh Khalifa bin Hamad Al Thani who visited Abu Dhabi and had no relationship with the UAE, and claimed the documentary was a falsification attempt to implicate the UAE in the coup.

=== Trial ===
The Emir's cousin, former Minister of Economy and head police chief Hamad bin Jassim bin Hamad Al Thani, was named as the prime architect of the coup. After years of exile, he was finally captured in July 1999 and brought to trial. In February 2000, Hamad bin Jassim, as well as 32 other plotters, were given life sentences for planning the coup. There were an additional 85 defendants who were convicted on charges relating to the coup; some were tried in absentia. All of the defendants in attendance pleaded not guilty.

== Aftermath ==
In March 2018, in an investigation conducted by the Qatari media organization Al Jazeera, Fahad Al-Malki, a Qatari then deputy head of intelligence and a key member of the coup attempt, was interviewed. He claimed that Hamad bin Isa Al Khalifa, then Bahraini crown-prince, transferred $265,000 to him in order to carry out post-coup attempt bombings throughout Qatar under the guise of an opposition group to Emir Hamad bin Khalifa Al Thani named "The Restoration of Legitimacy". In October 1996, Al-Malki ordered a bomb to be planted at the office of the Immigration Department, but his attempts were thwarted as the bomb did not detonate as expected. Later, he fled to the UAE to avoid trial. According to Amnesty International, in January 1999 Fahad Al Malki was forcibly returned to Qatar from Yemen. The UAE also arrested other coup plotters and forcibly returned them to Qatar. In Qatar, over 100 people were accused, many of them with confessions obtained under torture, according to Amnesty International. Fahad Al Malki was jailed in Qatar and was later pardoned by an Amiri decree in 2017.

== See also ==
- 1995 Qatari coup d'état
