= Jawaher bint Hamad Al Thani =

Qatari sheikha and royal consort

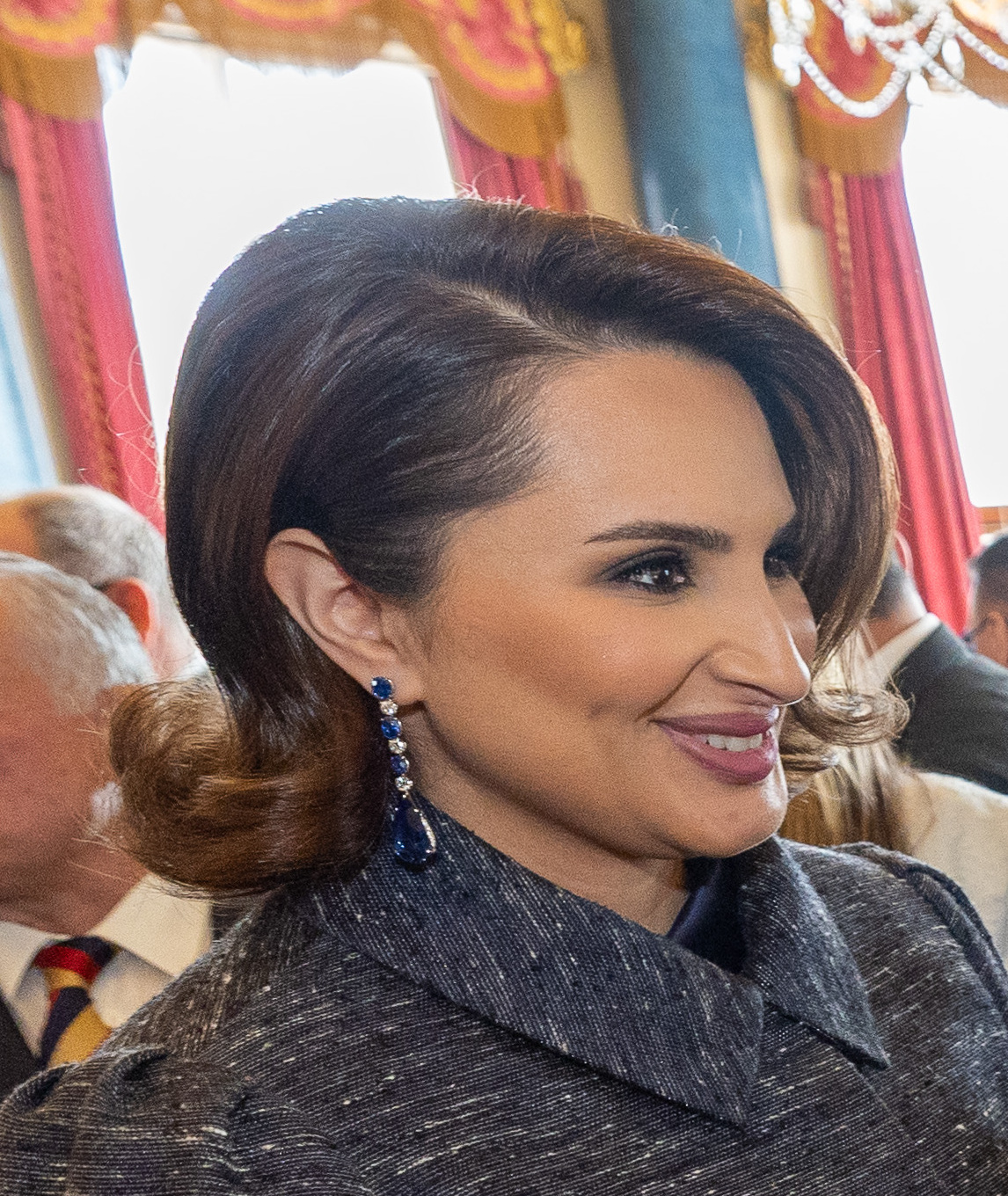
- Jawaher in 2023

Consort to the Emir of Qatar
- Tenure: 25 June 2013 – present
- Born: 1984 (age 41–42); Doha, Qatar
- Spouse: Tamim bin Hamad Al Thani (m. 2005)
- Issue: Sheikha Al Mayassa; Sheikh Hamad; Sheikha Aisha; Sheikh Jassim
Names
- Jawaher bint Hamad bin Suhaim Al Thani
- House: Thani
- Father: Hamad bin Suhaim Al Thani
- Mother: Hessa bint Ahmad Al Thani

Styles of Sheikha Jawaher
- Reference style: Her Highness
- Spoken style: Your Highness
- Alternative style: Sheikha

Jawaher bint Hamad bin Suhaim Al Thani (Arabic: جواهر بنت حمد بن سحيم آل ثاني) is a Qatari royal and the first wife and consort of Tamim bin Hamad Al Thani, the emir of Qatar. A member of the Qatari royal family by birth, she is the daughter of former government minister Sheikh Hamad bin Suhaim Al Thani and a grandniece of Emir Khalifa bin Hamad Al Thani.

== Personal life ==
Sheikha Jawaher was born in Doha in 1984 to Sheikh Hamad bin Suhaim Al Thani, a government minister and member of the Qatari royal family by his first wife, Sheikha Hessa bint Ahmad bin Saif Al Thani. Her paternal grandfather, Sheikh Suhaim bin Hamad Al Thani, was the Qatari foreign minister. She is a grandniece of Khalifa bin Hamad Al Thani, who ruled as the Emir of Qatar.

She married her second cousin, Tamim bin Hamad Al Thani, on 8 January 2005 at Al Wajbah Palace. They have four children, two sons and two daughters:

- Sheikha Al Mayassa bint Tamim bin Hamad Al Thani (born 15 January 2006).
- Sheikh Hamad bin Tamim bin Hamad Al Thani (born 20 October 2008).
- Sheikha Aisha bint Tamim bin Hamad Al Thani (born 24 August 2010).
- Sheikh Jassim bin Tamim bin Hamad Al Thani (born 12 June 2012).

In 2018, she called on Qataris to boycott Hajj.

In 2021, she received a Master of Arts degree from Qatar University.

Her name, Jawaher (or Jawahir) means "Jewels".

== Royal duties ==
Sheikha Jawaher's husband succeeded his father, Hamad bin Khalifa Al Thani, as Emir of Qatar on 25 June 2013. As his first wife, she serves as his consort.

In 2017, she served as royal patron of the graduating class of female students at her alma mater, Qatar University. In May 2022, she served again as royal patron at the 45th graduating class of female students at her the university. She honoured 479 of the 2,767 female students with awards for outstanding scholarship.

In October 2021, Sheikha Jawaher met with Queen Rania of Jordan at The Pearl Island and hosted a banquet in her honor.

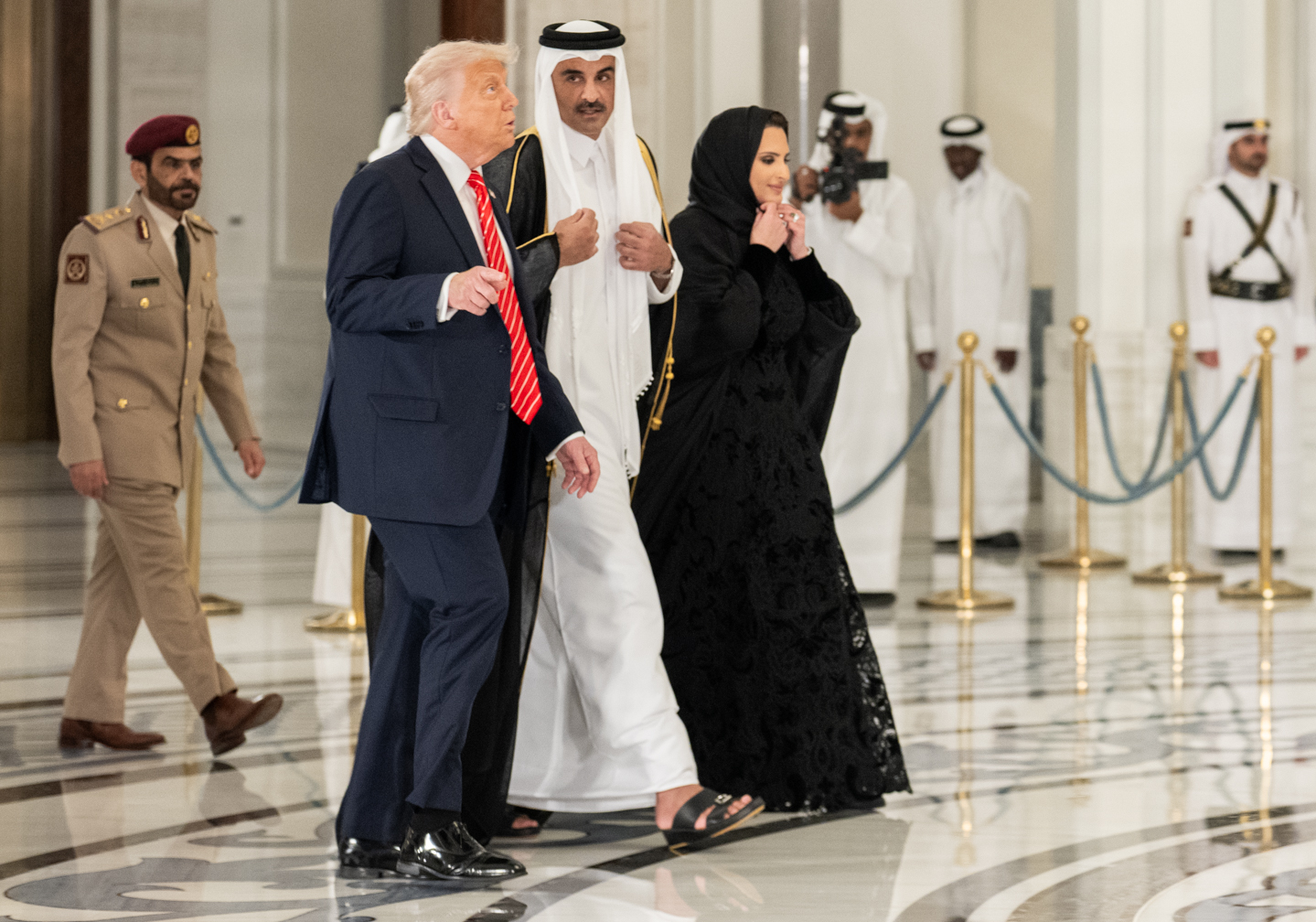
Sheikha Jawaher and her husband with U.S. President Donald Trump during his state visit to Qatar in 2025

Sheikha Jawaher accompanied her husband on an official state visit to Spain in May 2022. The trip was her first official state visit as consort since her husband became Emir in 2013. She and her husband attended a banquet luncheon hosted in their honour at the Palace of Zarzuela by King Felipe VI and Queen Letizia of Spain. Later, they were guests of honor at a state dinner at the Royal Palace of Madrid She was presented with the Royal Order of Isabella the Catholic by King Felipe VI.

On 19 September 2022, Sheikha Jawaher accompanied her husband at the state funeral of Queen Elizabeth II. On 6 May 2023, they attended the coronation of King Charles III and Queen Camilla.

On 24 June 2024, Sheikha Jawaher and her husband concluded an official visit to the Netherlands. They were received by King Willem-Alexander and Queen Máxima.

== Honours ==
- Spain: Dame Grand Cross of the Order of Isabella the Catholic (17 May 2022).
