= 1972 Qatari coup d'état =

Palace overthrow of Ahmad bin Ali Al Thani

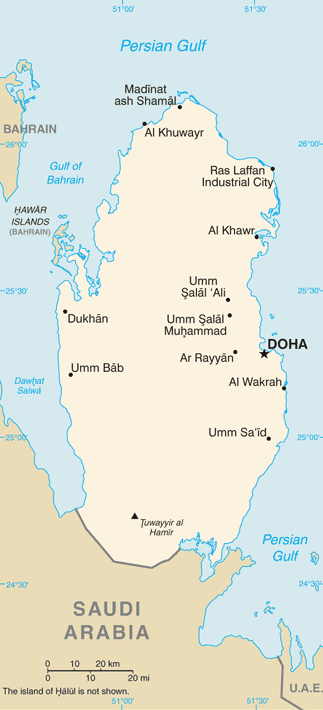
- A CIA WFB map of Qatar, not showing the Halul Island.
Date	22 February 1972
Location	Doha, Qatar 25°17′12″N 51°32′0″E
Result	Coup attempt succeeds.: Emir Ahmad bin Ali Al Thani ousted from power.

Commanders and leaders
(Qatar) Ahmad bin Ali Al Thani	(Qatar) Khalifa bin Hamad Al Thani

Casualties and losses
- No casualties reported.

The 1972 Qatari coup d'état was a bloodless palace coup that took place in Qatar on 22 February 1972. The coup was carried out by the heir apparent and prime minister Khalifa bin Hamad Al Thani, who took control of the country while his cousin, Emir Ahmad bin Ali Al Thani, was on a visit to Iran.

While many Western news outlets referred to the event as a coup, the Qatari population merely considered it to be a succession of power.

== Aftermath ==
The initial activity of the new Emir was the process of the reorganization of the government. The process saw a dramatic shift in the hierarchy of authority. Khalifa bin Hamad immensely reduced the traditional powers afforded to the heir apparent while projecting all of the power onto himself. He appointed Suhaim bin Hamad Al Thani as Minister of Foreign Affairs; he also appointed an adviser to himself regarding the day-to-day affairs. Furthermore, he limited the financial privileges of members of the ruling Al Thani family.

After his deposition, the former Emir lived in exile in London and chose to remain in exile until his death in 1977.

== See also ==
- 1995 Qatari coup d'état
