= Abdullah bin Ali Al Thani =

Qatari royal

- Abdullah bin Ali bin Abdullah bin Jassim bin Mohammed Al Thani
- House: House of Thani
- Father: Ali bin Abdullah Al Thani

Abdullah bin Ali Al Thani is a member of the Thani dynasty and the son of the former Emir of Qatar, Ali bin Abdullah Al Thani, who ruled the country between 1949 and 1960.

== Biography ==
Abdullah bin Ali is the second son of Ali bin Abdullah Al Thani. His grandfather was the Emir of Qatar, Abdullah bin Jassim Al Thani. Abdullah's brother, Sheikh Ahmed bin Ali Al Thani, ruled the country from 1960 to 22 February 1972 when he was overthrown by Sheikh Khalifa bin Hamad Al Thani. Abdullah bin Ali headed Qatar's camel-racing federation in the 1980s. Later, he left Qatar to live in different countries.

Following his criticisms about the crisis between Qatar and the neighbouring countries on his official Twitter account in September 2017, the Emir of Qatar, Tamim bin Hamad Al Thani, allegedly seized the bank accounts of Abdullah bin Ali. On 18 September 2017, Abdullah bin Ali was called the legitimate heir to the throne in an op-ed by Khaled M. Batarfi in Saudi Gazette.

In January 2018, Abdullah bin Ali released a video arguing that he had been detained in the United Arab Emirates against his will. He was visiting Abu Dhabi as a guest of the Crown Prince Mohamed bin Zayed Al Nahyan. Soon after his announcement, he went to Kuwait.
