= Kasia Al Thani =

American-born Qatari royal (1976–2022)

- Sheikha
- Born: 2 October 1976; Kraków
- Died: 29 May 2022 (aged 45); Marbella
- Burial: Córdoba Province
- Spouse: Abdelaziz bin Khalifa Al Thani (m. 2004; sep. 2012)
- Issue: Malak bint Abdulaziz bin Khalifa Al-Thani Sheikha Yasmine bint Abdulaziz bin Khalifa Al-Thani Sheikha Reem bint Abdulaziz bin Khalifa Al-Thani
- House: Thani (by marriage)
- Religion: Islam

Kasia Al Thani (2 October 1976 – 29 May 2022) was the third wife of Sheikh Abdelaziz bin Khalifa Al Thani, the son of Khalifa bin Hamad Al Thani, Emir of Qatar.

== Biography ==
She was born as Kasia Gallanio in Kraków, Poland, but grew up in Los Angeles, California, United States. While she was a 19-year-old student in Paris, she met her future husband, who had lived in exile in France since 1992 in a palace on Avenue Montaigne. In 2004, she became his third wife. They had three daughters together; twins Sheikha Malak and Sheika Yasmine (b. 2005), and Sheikha Reem (b. 2006). In 2007, she launched a luxury gifting shopping company called Savoir-Faire.com, which went into voluntary liquidation in 2010.

She discovered fraudulent activity on her husband's account at Barclays Bank in Marbella and spearheaded a €50m/£40m legal action against the bank. In 2009, Barclays settled for an undisclosed amount. She later filed for divorce, and the couple fought over custody of their daughters for ten years, after allegations that he sexually assaulted their eldest child. In April 2018, she joined the FC Martigues business team. She resided in Marbella, Spain, where she was found dead of an apparent drug overdose on 29 May 2022. She was buried by the arabic rite in an undisclosed town in Córdoba.
