= Jassim bin Hamad Al Thani (1921–1976) =

Qatari royal and politician

Jassim bin Hamad bin Abdullah bin Jassim bin Muhammed Al Thani (1921 – July 1976 in Denver, Colorado, United States) was the eldest son of Hamad bin Abdullah Al Thani, himself the second son and heir apparent of the ruler of Qatar, but who died (in 1948) before his father. As a result, Jassim's uncle Ali bin Abdullah Al Thani became the emir in 1949.

He was appointed in 1958 as the first Minister of Education in Qatar, a position he held until his death in 1976.

On the accession of their first cousin Ali to the Emirate in 1960, Jassim's younger brother, Khalifa bin Hamad Al Thani, was named as heir apparent. Khalifa deposed Ali in 1972.

== Family ==
Jassim bin Hamad had four sons: Hamad bin Jassim bin Hamad Al Thani, Abdelaziz bin Jassim bin Hamad, Abdallah bin Jassim bin Hamad (married Sheikha bint Muhammad bin Hamad bin Abdullah and had 4 sons and 3 daughters), and Fahad bin Jassim bin Hamad.

He also had eight daughters: Lolwa bint Jassim bin Hamad (married Abdullah bin Khalifa Al Thani and had 6 sons and 3 daughters), Noora bint Jassim bin Hamad (married Abdelaziz bin khalifa bin ali and had 2 sons and 5 daughters), Rodha bint Jassim bin Hamad (married Saud bin Abdelaziz Al Thani and had 4 sons, 3 daughters), Aisha bint Jassim bin Hamad (married Hamad bin Jassim bin Ali and had 3 son and 2 daughter), Sheikha bint Jassim bin Hamad, Maryam bint Jassim bin Hamad (married Khalid bin Jassim bin Khalid bin ahmed and had 2 sons and 2 daughter), and Maha bint Jassim bin Hamad (married Muhammad bin Khalifa bin Hamad and had 1 son and 4 daughters).
