= 1995 Qatari coup d'état =

Palace overthrow of Khalifa bin Hamad Al Thani

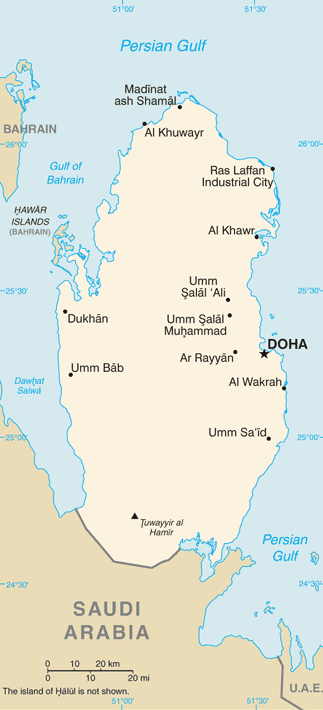
- A CIA WFB map of Qatar, not showing the Halul Island.
Date	27 June 1995
Location	Doha, Qatar 25°17′12″N 51°32′0″E
Result	Coup attempt succeeds.: Emir Khalifa bin Hamad Al Thani ousted from power.

Commanders and leaders
(Qatar) Khalifa bin Hamad Al Thani	(Qatar) Hamad bin Khalifa Al Thani

Casualties and losses
- No casualties reported.

A bloodless palace coup took place in Qatar on 27 June 1995. The coup was carried out by Crown Prince Hamad bin Khalifa Al Thani who, with the support of the ruling Al Thani family, took control of the country while his father, Emir Khalifa bin Hamad Al Thani, was on a visit to Geneva, Switzerland. The coup came after a falling-out between Hamad bin Khalifa and his father who, in early 1995, had tried regaining some of the authority he bestowed upon Hamad in 1992.

== Aftermath ==
In response to the coup, Khalifa bin Hamad called his son an "ignorant man" and proclaimed that he was still the legitimate ruler, while Hamad bin Khalifa engaged an American law firm to freeze his father's bank accounts abroad in order to deter a possible counter-coup. However, a counter-coup was attempted in February 1996 under the leadership of former Economy Minister Hamad bin Jassim bin Hamad Al Thani. The counter-coup failed, and several of Qatar's traditional Arab allies were implicated in the plot, namely Saudi Arabia, the United Arab Emirates, Bahrain and Egypt.

After his deposition, the former Emir lived in exile in France and Abu Dhabi, United Arab Emirates, until he returned to Qatar in 2004.

== See also ==
- 1972 Qatari coup d'état
- 1996 Qatari coup attempt
