= Abdelaziz bin Ahmed Al Thani =

Abdulaziz bin Ahmed Al Thani عبد العزيز بن أحمد آل ثاني
- Crown Prince of Qatar
- Born: c. 1946; Doha, Qatar
- Died: February 14, 2008 (aged 61–62); Jeddah, Saudi Arabia
- Burial: Qatar
- House: Thani
- Father: Ahmad bin Ali Al Thani
- Mother: Hassa bint Hamad Al Thani
- Religion: Islam

Sheikh Abdulaziz bin Ahmad bin Ali bin Abdullah bin Jassim bin Muhammed Al Thani (Arabic: عبد العزيز بن أحمد بن علي آل ثاني; c. 1946 – February 14, 2008) was the eldest son of the Emir of the State of Qatar Ahmad bin Ali Al Thani.

== Biography ==
Sheikh Abdulaziz bin Ahmed Al Thani was born in 1946, the oldest son of Emir Ahmad bin Ali Al Thani.

Sheikh Abdulaziz served as Minister for Health between 1967 and 1972 and also as president of the Palestine Red Crescent Society. He was the crown prince of Qatar but lost his position on 22 February 1972 when Prime Minister Khalifa bin Hamad Al Thani took power in a nonviolent palace coup.

Sheikh Abdulaziz then left Qatar and lived in exile in Saudi Arabia until his death on February 14, 2008, in Jeddah. He was buried in Al-Rayyan Cemetery in Qatar.

== Sons ==
Abdulaziz had fifteen sons, listed here with their sons.

- Khalid bin Abdulaziz bin Ahmed Al-Thani. Five sons: Ahmed, Abdullah, Hamad, Sultan, Faisal
- Abdullah bin Abdulaziz bin Ahmed Al-Thani. Three sons: Abdulaziz, Ahmed, Ali
- Khalifa bin Abdulaziz bin Ahmed Al-Thani. One son: Abdulaziz
- Mohammed bin Abdulaziz bin Ahmed Al-Thani. Five sons: Hussein, Ahmed, Nasser, Jassim, Abdulaziz
- Talal bin Abdulaziz bin Ahmed Al-Thani. Five sons: Hamad, Abdulaziz, Jassim, Abdulla, Ahmed
- Hamad bin Abdulaziz bin Ahmed Al-Thani
- Ali bin Abdulaziz bin Ahmed Al-Thani. Three sons: Abdulaziz, Ahmed, Jassim
- Ahmed bin Abdulaziz bin Ahmed Al-Thani. Four sons: Abdulaziz, Nasser, Hamad, Khalid
- Abdulrahman bin Abdulaziz bin Ahmed Al-Thani. One son: Abdulaziz
- Fahad bin Abdulaziz bin Ahmed Al-Thani
- Jassim bin Abdulaziz bin Ahmed Al-Thani
- Al Hassan bin Abdulaziz bin Ahmed Al-Thani
- Youssef bin Abdulaziz bin Ahmed Al-Thani
- Bader bin Abdulaziz bin Ahmed Al-Thani
- Abdulaziz bin Abdulaziz bin Ahmed Al-Thani
