= Al Aaliya Island =

Island belonging to Qatar

Al Aaliya Island جزيرة العالية Jazīrat ‘Alya
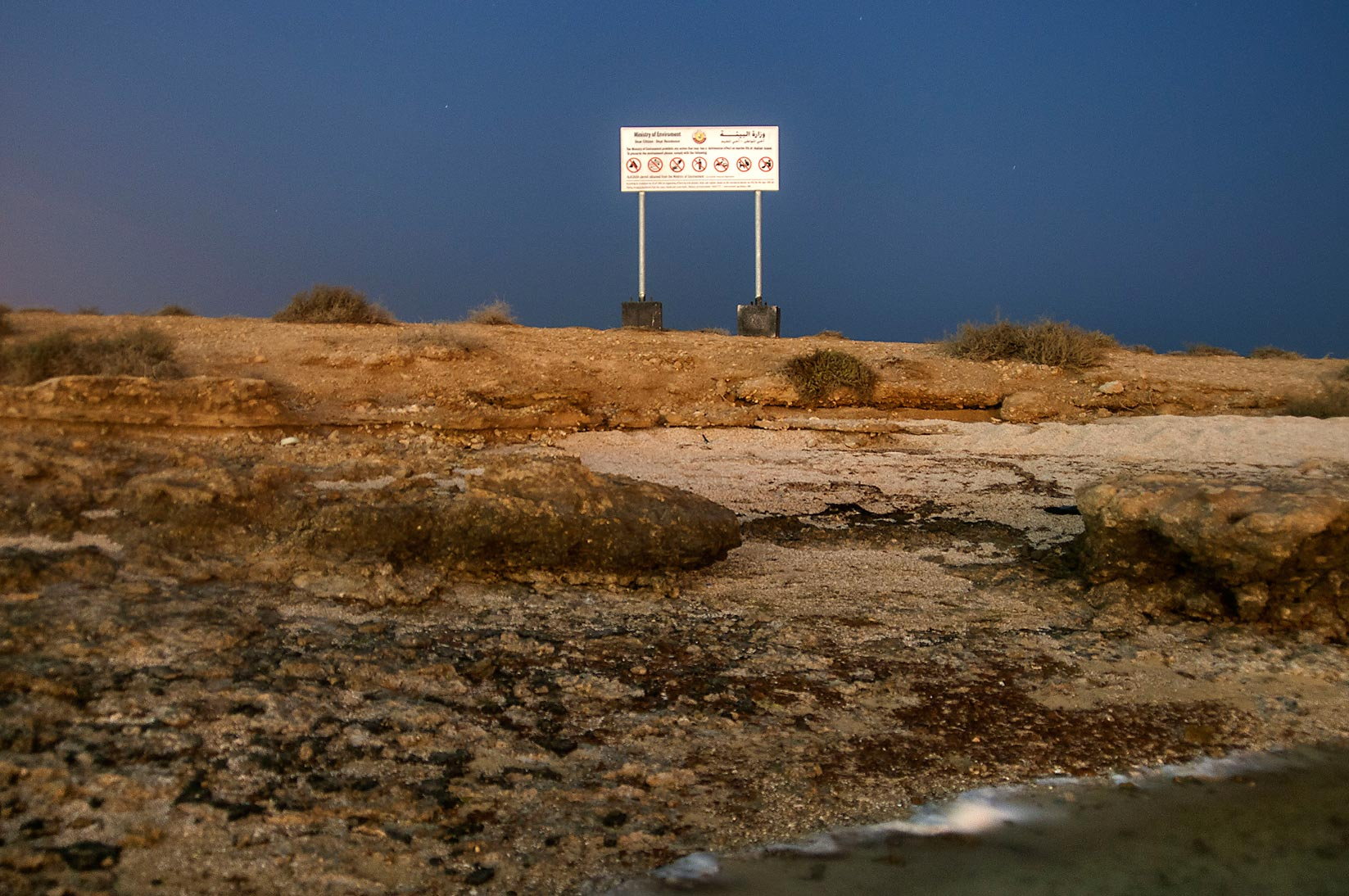

- Location within Persian Gulf
- Coordinates: 25°24′23″N 51°33′56″E
- Country: Qatar
- Municipality: Al Daayen
- Zone: Zone 69

Al Aaliya Island (Arabic: جزيرة العالية, romanized: Jazīrat ‘Alya) is an island located off the coast of the municipality of Al Daayen in Qatar, north of The Pearl.

== Etymology ==
In Arabic, the island's name translates to "upper" or "top", referring to its location to the north of Al Safliya Island.

== Description ==
It is a small, low-lying island, of a brown colour, with a little peak at its east end, lying 3½ miles north of Al Safliya Island; it is visible 6 or 7 miles. Between these two islands is the artificial island of The Pearl, which was built in the late 2000s. In the past its eastern peak was useful as a mark entering the Al Bidda harbour.

Unlike Halul or Shra'ouh, which rest on ancient igneous and metamorphic rock formations, Al Aaliya is primarily composed of coral reef structures, similar to nearby Al Safliya.

== Environment ==
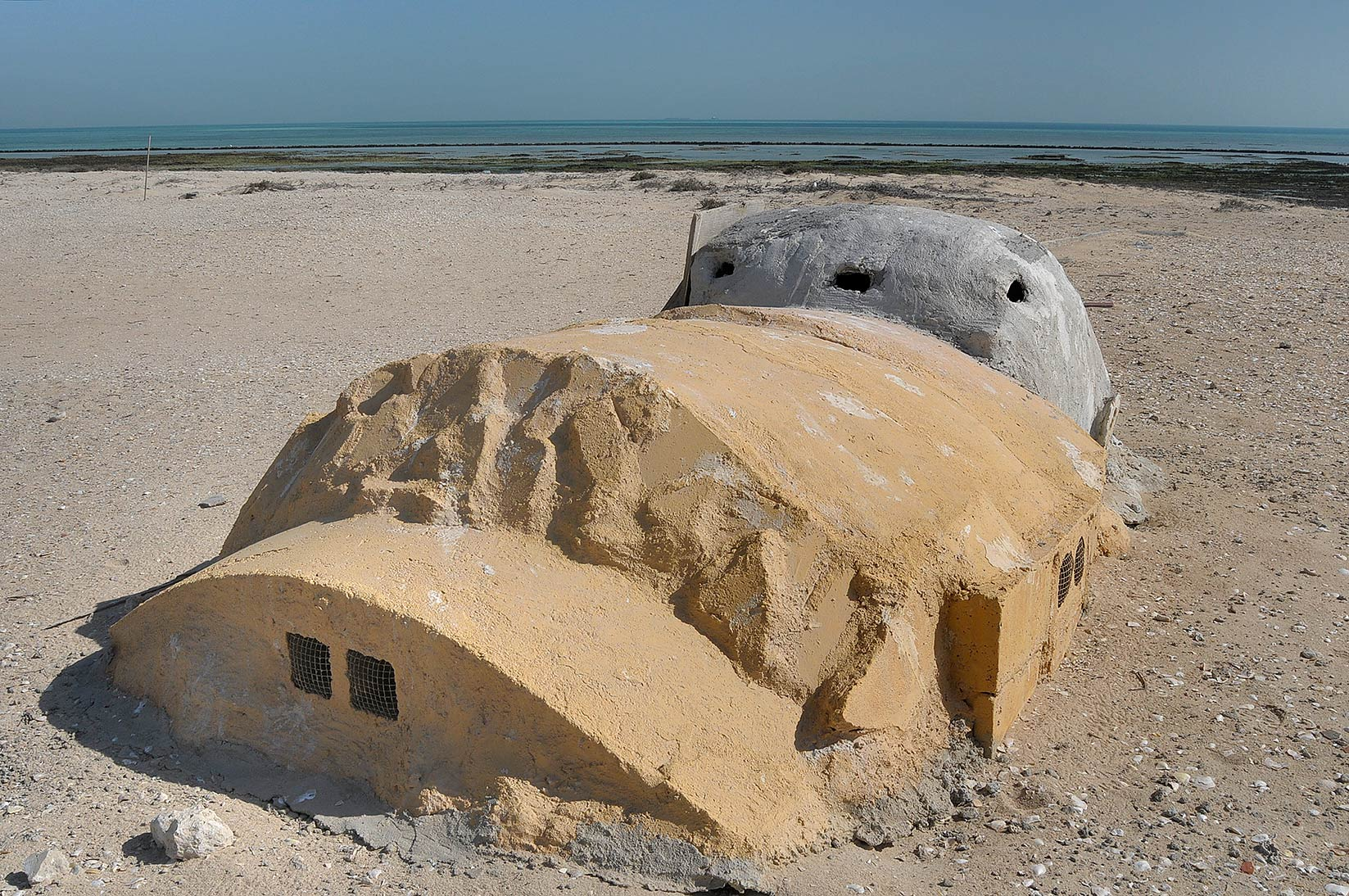
Bird house on Al Aaliya Island

The surface of the island is loose, weathered limestone rock with scattered Limonium and Zygophyllum bushes. A 2 km sandspit extends southward from the island at low tide. There are broad intertidal flats to the south and east, and coral reefs in the adjacent waters. The island has been designated an Important Bird Area (IBA) by BirdLife International because it supports breeding colonies of Socotra cormorants and white-cheeked terns.

== See also ==
- List of islands of Qatar
