= Al Safliya Island =

Al Safliya Island اَلْجَزِيرَة اَلسَّافِلِيَّة Jazīrat as Sāfliya
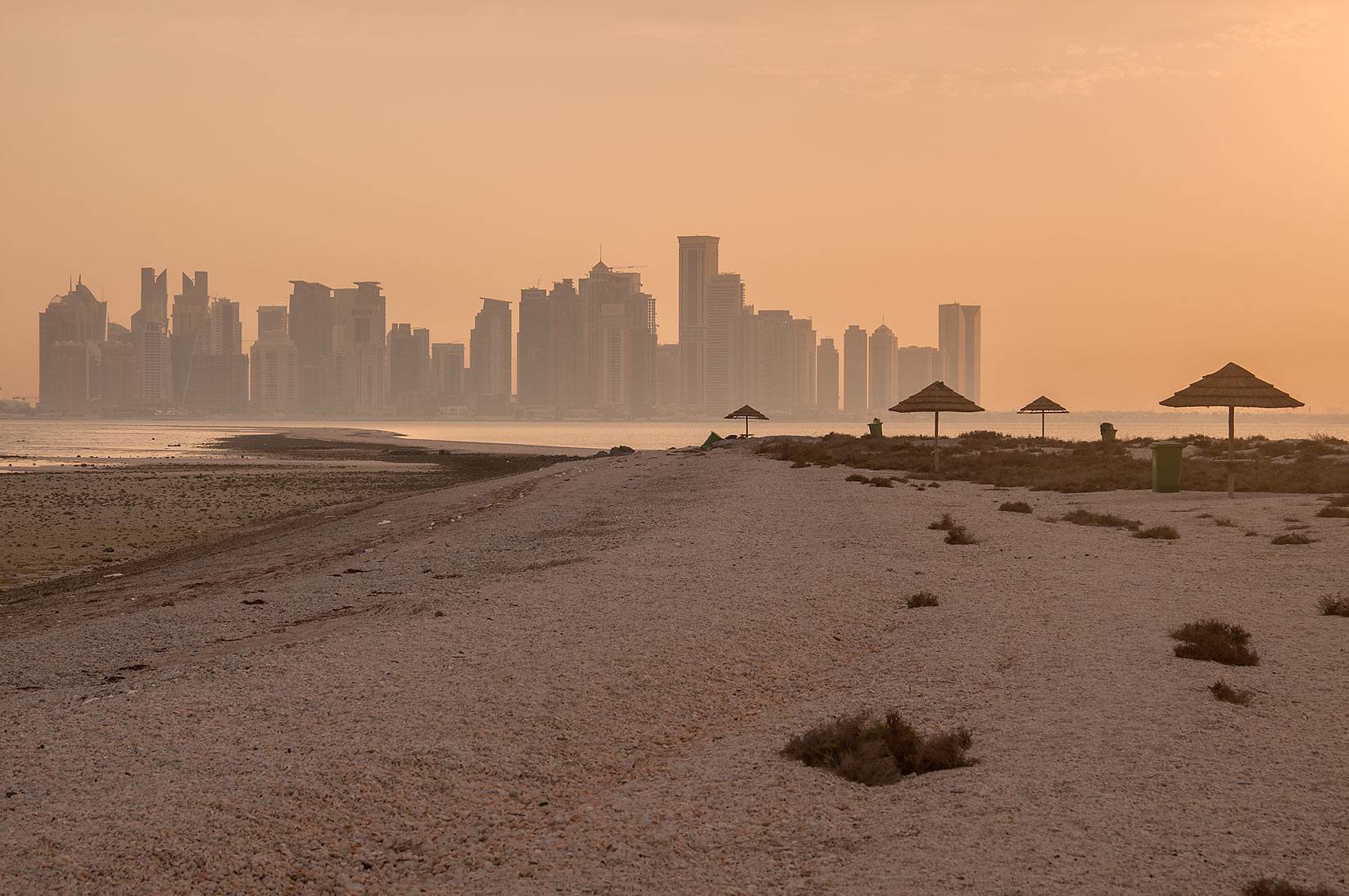

- Location within Persian Gulf
- Coordinates: 25°20′41″N 51°34′31″E
- Country: Qatar
- Municipality: Doha

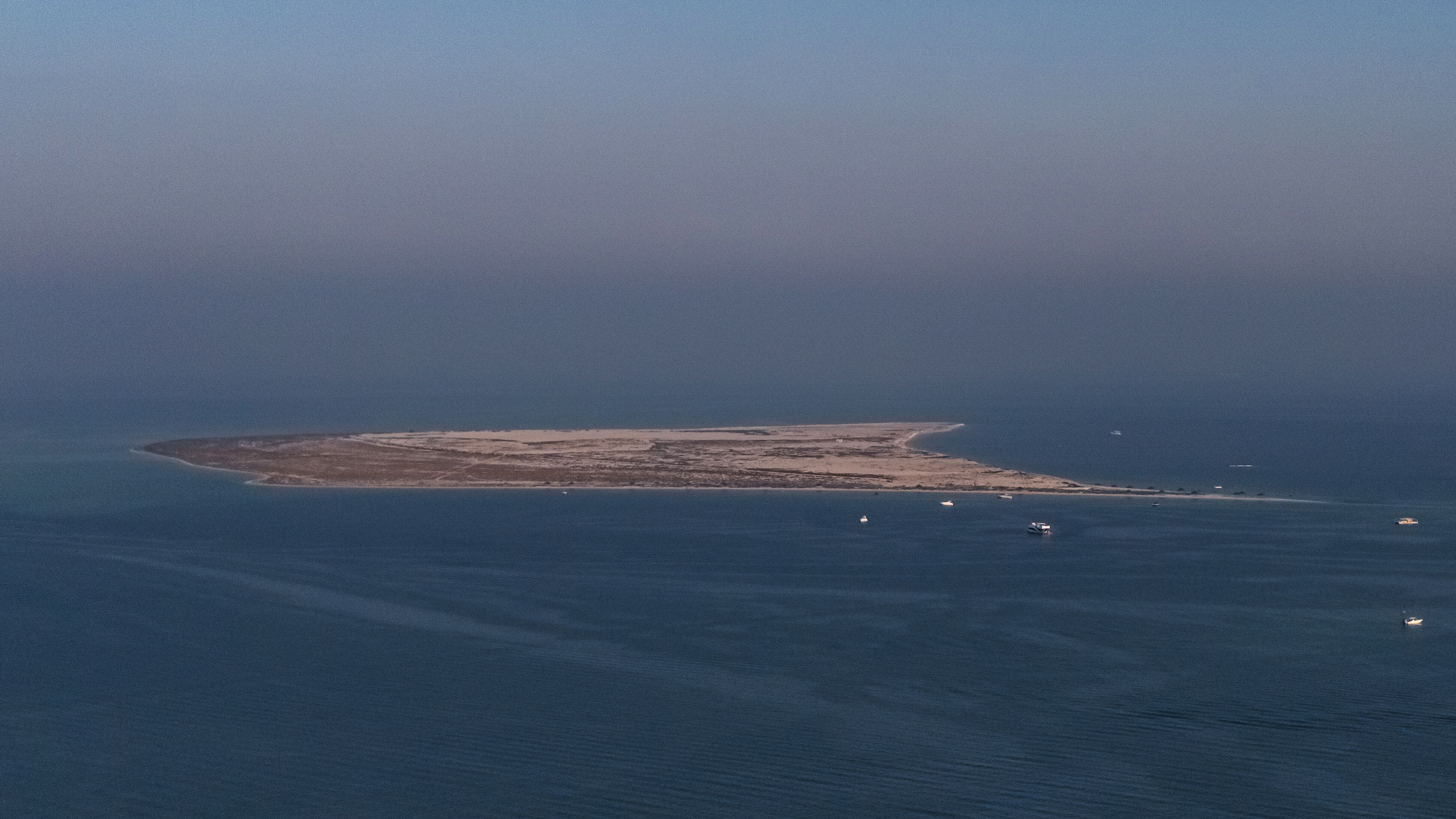
Aerial view of the island in 2024

Al Safliya Island (Arabic: اَلْجَزِيرَة اَلسَّافِلِيَّة, romanized: Jazīrat as Sāfliya) is an island located off the coast of Doha, the capital city of Qatar.

The island is located 3 miles north of Ras Abu Aboud. A popular tourist destination among locals, journey by boat from Doha takes roughly 30 to 40 minutes.

== Etymology ==
In Arabic, the island's name translates to "lower" or "bottom", referring to its location to the south of Al Aaliya Island.

== Description ==
Al Safliya Island is about 2 miles long east to west, very narrow, and curves with the northern side of the Doha Port; it is low, sandy and has clusters of grass. The northern reef projects 1 ½ miles southeastward from the island; it is mainly sand, and outside the entrance trends northeastward and northward for some miles.

Unlike Halul or Shra'ouh, which rest on ancient igneous and metamorphic rock formations, Al Safliya is primarily composed of coral reef structures, similar to nearby Al Aaliya.

== Conservation ==
In 2015, the Ministry of Municipality and Environment initiated a clean-up campaign for the island of Al Safliya which included removing the waste and plastic cans that have been left on the island by visitors. They also installed 35 pergolas.

== See also ==
- List of islands of Qatar
