= Hamad bin Suhaim Al Thani =

Qatari politician (born 1958)

- Sheikh
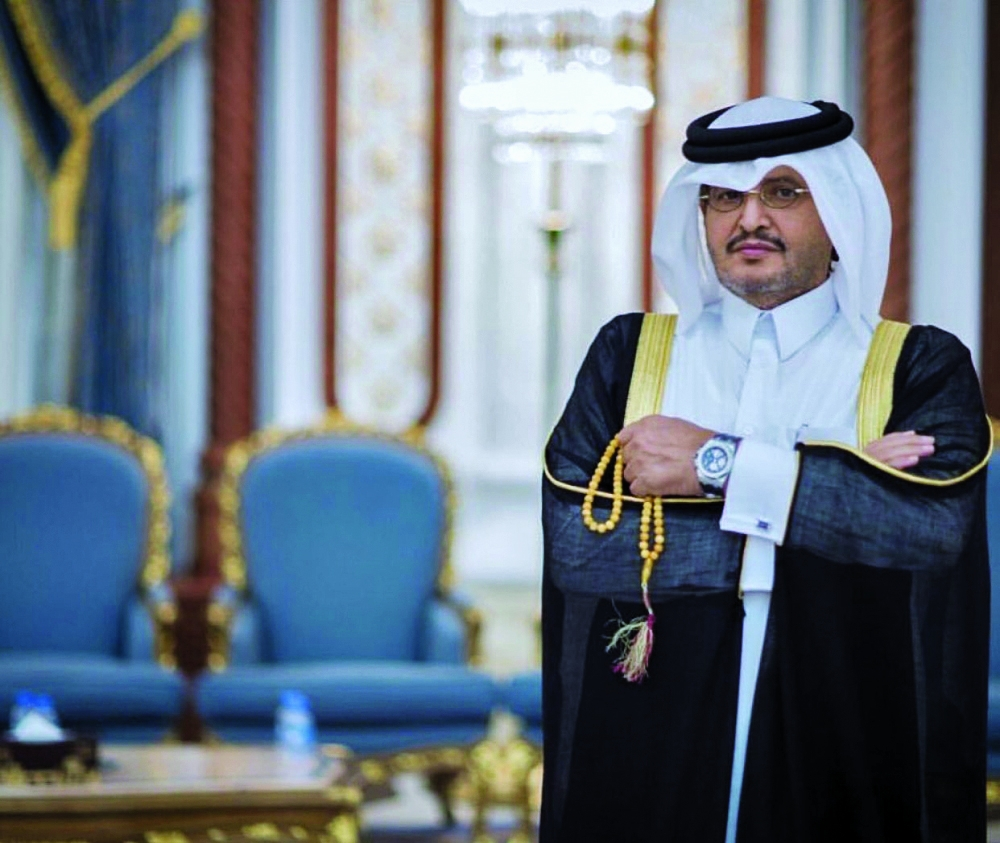
- Born: 1958 (age 67–68)
- Spouse: Hessa bint Ahmad Al Thani (first wife)
- Issue: Sheikha Jawaher; Sheikha Mashael; Sheikha Noof; Sheikha Aldana
- House: House of Thani
- Father: Suhaim bin Hamad Al Thani
- Mother: Aisha bint Mohammed Al Suwaidi

Hamad bin Suhaim Al Thani (born 1958) is a former government minister of Qatar. He is the son of Sheikh Suhaim bin Hamad Al Thani, the granduncle of the current Emir of Qatar, Tamim bin Hamad Al Thani and his father-in-law, through Tamin's marriage to Hamad's daughter Sheikha Jawaher bint Hamad Al Thani.

== Biography ==
He studied at the Royal Military Academy Sandhurst.

He was deputy of Foreign Affairs Minister from 1986 to 1989. He was Minister of Information and Culture from 1989–1992 then Minister of Public Health from 1992 to 1995. He was the Palace Affairs Minister from 1995 to 1996.

He has been a Minister of State Without Portfolio since 1996.

In August 2020, Sheikh Hamad was elected as the new president of Qatar SC.

== Family ==
Sheikh Hamad is married to five wives:

Among his daughters are:

- Sheikha Jawaher bint Hamad, married her second cousin, the current Emir of Qatar, Sheikh Tamim Bin Hamad Al Thani, has two daughters; Almayassa and Aisha, and two sons; Hamad and Jassim.
- Sheikha Mashael bint Hamad, married Sheikh Nasser bin Ali Ahmed bin Khalifa Al Thani, has two daughters and one son.
- Sheikha Noof bint Hamad, married to Sheikh Ahmed bin Hamad Al Thani, has one son.
- Sheikha Aldana bint Hamad, married to Sheikh Mohammed bin Faisal bin Qassim Al Thani, has two sons.
