= Jawahir =

- Gender: Female

Origin
- Origin: Arabic
- Meaning: Jewels

Jawahir is a female name of Arabic origin. It translates as "jewels".

== Given name ==
- Jawahir Ahmed, Somali model
- Jawahir Roble, Somali-born British football referee
- Jawahir Shah, Indian cricketer
- Jawahir Thontowi, Indonesian academic
- Jawaher bint Hamad bin Suhaim Al Thani, Qatari Sheikha, Consort to the Emir of Qatar

== Surname ==
- Lisa Jawahir, Saint Lucian politician

== See also ==
- Yasmin (given name)
