= Saud bin Abdelaziz Al Thani =

Member of Royal family and politician

Saud bin Abdelaziz bin Hamad bin Abdullah bin Jassim bin Muhammed Al Thani (Arabic: سعود بن عبد العزيز بن حمد آل ثاني; born 1949) is the cousin of Qatari ruler Hamad bin Khalifa Al Thani, grandson of Hamad bin Abdullah Al Thani and great-grandson of Abdullah bin Jassim Al Thani. Estimates of his net worth range from 3 to 12 billion USD.

== Family ==
He has 3 wives and has 10 sons and 7 daughters.

- Roda bint Jassim bin Hamad bin Abdullah Al Thani (daughter of his uncle Jassim bin Hamad bin Abdullah Al Thani, granddaughter of Hamad bin Abdullah Al Thani)
  - 'Abdu'l-Aziz bin Sa'ud, married daughter of Fahad bin Abdulaziz bin Hamad, 1 son
  - 'Abdullah bin Sa'ud, married the daughter of Khalifa bin Hamad bin Abdullah, 3 sons, 2 daughters
  - Hamad bin Sa'ud married twice, having 2 sons, 4 daughters from his first marriage - 1 son, 3 daughters from his second marriage.
  - Khalid bin Sa'ud, married daughter of Hamad bin Khalifa bin Hamad, 1 son, 3 daughters
  - Muhammed bin Sa'ud, married daughter of (unknown), 1 son (Sa'ud ibn Muhamad)
- Shaikha bint Ahmed bin Saleh bin Majid Al Khulaifi, Professor of Islamic History, Qatar University
  - Fahad bin Sa'ud 1 son (Abdulrahman bin Fahad), 3 daughters (Sheikha bint Fahad, Fatma bint Fahad, Nayla bint Fahad)
  - Ali bin Sa'ud
- Lolwa bint Mohammed bin Hamad bin Abdullah Al Thani, (daughter of his uncle Mohammed bin Hamad bin Abdullah Al Thani and granddaughter of Hamad bin Abdullah Al Thani)
  - Jassim bin Sa'ud
  - Khalifa bin Sa'ud
  - Ahmed bin Sa'ud
