= Mohamed Bin Hamad Holding =

Qatar-based private holding company

Mohamed Bin Hamad Holding Company
- Company type: Private
- Industry: Healthcare, Hospitality, Travel, Real Estate, Petrochemicals, F&B
- Founded: 1968
- Founder: Sheikh Mohammed bin Hamad Al Thani
- Headquarters: Doha, Qatar
- Key people: Sheikh Jassim bin Mohamed bin Hamad Al Thani (Chairman).
- Website: mbhhc.com

Mohamed Bin Hamad Holding (often styled Mohamed Bin Hamad Holding Company, abbreviated MBHHC) is a Qatar-based private holding company and family enterprise that owns and operates businesses in healthcare, hospitality, travel and tourism, real estate, petrochemicals and food & beverage. The group was founded by Sheikh Mohammed bin Hamad bin Abdullah Al Thani and has been active in Qatar for more than five decades.

== Operations and subsidiaries ==
MBHH operates through a number of subsidiaries across various business sectors. Key divisions include:

- Healthcare and Pharmaceuticals: Doha Clinic Hospital, ICON Medical Center, Ibn Al-Haytham Pharmacies, Diet Center, Ibn Al-Haytham Company
- Hospitality: Crowne Plaza Doha - The Business Park, Holiday Inn Doha - The Business Park
- Real Estate: The Business Park, Abu Sidra City, Al Dana Gardens
- Travel and Tourism: Trans Orient Air Services, Trans Orient Travel & Tourism, Trans Orient Cargo, and Mosaic Visa Services
- Other Investments: West Bay Petroleum and Abu Sidra Mall

Mohamed Bin Hamad Holding (MBHH) has recognized as one of the top 100 Arab family businesses by Forbes Middle East in 2025.
