= List of lighthouses in Qatar =

This is a list of lighthouses in Qatar.

== Lighthouses ==
Name	Image	Year built	Location & coordinates	Class of Light	Focal height	NGA number	Admiralty number	Range nml
Halat Umm Al Khayfan Lighthouse		n/a	offshore Doha; 25°09′06.0″N 51°57′36.0″E (NGA)	Fl (2) W 20s.	13 metres (43 ft)	29912	D7382	18
Jazirat Halul Lighthouse		n/a	Halul Island; 25°40′25.2″N 52°24′32.9″E	Fl WR 12s.	67 metres (220 ft)	29816	D7378	white: 19 red: 9
Lightfloat Doha		n/a	offshore Doha; 25°16′24.0″N 51°45′06.0″E (NGA)	Mo (D) W 12s.	6 metres (20 ft)	29892	D7389	8
Ra's al Matbakh Lighthouse	Image	n/a	Ras Matbakh; 25°40′49.3″N 51°34′48.8″E	Fl WR 5s.	17 metres (56 ft)	29812	D7393	white: 21 red: 18
Ra's Umm Hasah Lighthouse		n/a	Al Ghariyah; 26°06′03.0″N 51°21′38.5″E	V Q (3) W 5s.	12 metres (39 ft)	29794	D7394.5	10

== See also ==
- Lists of lighthouses and lightvessels
