= Hamad bin Abdullah Al Thani =

Qatari royal (1896–1948)

- Born: 1896; Doha, Qatar
- Died: 27 May 1948 (aged 51–52); Dukhan, Qatar
- Burial: Al Rayyan Cemetery
- Spouse: Sheikha Sarah bint Mohammed bin Jassim Al Thani
- Issue: Sheikh Jassim bin Hamad Al Thani; Sheikh Abdelaziz bin Hamad Al Thani; Sheikh Mohammed bin Hamad Al Thani; Sheikh Khalifa bin Hamad Al Thani; Sheikh Abdelrahman bin Hamad Al Thani; Sheikh Suhaim bin Hamad Al Thani; Sheikh Khalid bin Hamad Al Thani; Sheikh Nassir bin Hamad Al Thani; Sheikh Ahmed bin Hamad Al Thani
- House: Thani
- Father: Abdullah bin Jassim Al Thani
- Mother: Mariam bint Abdullah Al Attiyah
- Religion: Islam

Styles of Sheikh Hamad
- Reference style: His Excellency
- Spoken style: Your Excellency

Hamad bin Abdullah bin Jassim bin Mohammed Al Thani (Arabic: حمد بن عبد الله بن جاسم بن محمد آل ثاني; 1896 – 27 May 1948) was Crown Prince of Qatar. Sheikh Hamad was the second son of the second emir of Qatar, Sheikh Abdullah bin Jassim Al Thani, and also the father of the fifth emir of Qatar, Sheikh Khalifa bin Hamad Al Thani.

== Life ==
He was born in Doha and educated privately at the palace. In 1935, he was made heir apparent by his father and served as deputy ruler on several times. Early on in his childhood, his father exposed him in to the life of a politician. He was expected to become the next emir, but he died whilst his father was still alive. After his death, his father passed the powers to his older son, Ali bin Abdullah Al Thani.

He died in Dukhan on 27 May 1948.

== Marriage and children ==
During his life Sheikh Hamad married his first cousin Sheikha Sarah bint Mohammed bin Jassim Al Thani. They had nine sons:

- Sheikh Jassim bin Hamad Al Thani
- Sheikh Abdelaziz bin Hamad Al Thani
- Sheikh Mohammed bin Hamad Al Thani
- Sheikh Khalifa bin Hamad Al Thani, 5th emir of Qatar
- Sheikh Abdelrahman bin Hamad Al Thani
- Sheikh Suhaim bin Hamad Al Thani
- Sheikh Khalid bin Hamad Al Thani
- Sheikh Nassir bin Hamad Al Thani
- Sheikh Ahmed bin Hamad Al Thani
