= Abdelaziz bin Khalifa Al Thani =

Member of the royal family of Qatar

- Sheikh
- Born: 12 December 1948 (age 77); Al Rayyan, Qatar
- Abdelaziz bin Khalifa bin Hamad bin Abdullah bin Jassim bin Muhammed Al Thani
- House: Thani
- Father: Khalifa bin Hamad Al Thani
- Mother: Amna bint Hassan bin Abdullah Al Thani
- Religion: Islam

Abdelaziz bin Khalifa bin Hamad bin Abdullah bin Jassim bin Muhammed Al Thani (Arabic: عبد العزيز بن خليفة بن حمد بن عبد الله بن جاسم بن محمد آل ثاني; born 12 December 1948) is a member of the royal family of Qatar, the House of Thani.

== Early life ==
Abdelaziz bin Khalifa is the first son of Emir of Qatar Khalifa bin Hamad Al Thani, and the eldest child of the Emir and his first spouse, Sheikha Amna bint Hassan bin Abdulla Al Thani. Sheikh Abdelaziz is the elder half-brother of Hamad, the former Emir of Qatar.

== Career ==
Abdelaziz served as oil minister and minister of finance between 1972 and 1992.

=== Exile ===
After leaving office, Abdelaziz began to live in France in a palace on Avenue Montaigne. In a news article mentioning a foiled coup in 2011 he was supported by 66 opposition leaders including 16 from the House of Thani in 2011.

Quartet media reports that Abdelaziz is the head of the opposition.

== Personal life ==
Abdelaziz's first wife was Sheikha Luluwah bint Jassim bin Hamad Al Thani, with whom he had six children: Sheikha Mona bint Abdulaziz bin Khalifa Al-Thani, Sheikha Al-Anoud bint Abdulaziz bin Khalifa Al-Thani, Sheikh Jassim bin Abdulaziz bin Khalifa Al-Thani, Sheikha Al-Jazi bint Abdulaziz bin Khalifa Al-Thani, Sheikha Amna bint Abdulaziz bin Khalifa Al-Thani, and Sheikha Mariam bint Abdulaziz bin Khalifa Al-Thani.

His second wife is Sheikha Aisha bint Nasser Al Suwaidi, with whom he has three children: Sheikh Faisal bin Abdulaziz bin Khalifa Al-Thani, Sheikha Alia bint Abdulaziz bin Khalifa Al-Thani, and Sheikha Maha bint Abdulaziz bin Khalifa Al-Thani.

His third wife was Sheikha Kasia Al Thani [née Gallanio], with whom he has three daughters: Sheikha Malak bint Abdulaziz bin Khalifa Al-Thani and her twin sister Sheikha Yasmine bint Abdulaziz bin Khalifa Al-Thani, along with Sheikha Reem bint Abdulaziz bin Khalifa Al-Thani.
