= List of islands of Qatar =

This is a list of islands of Qatar, inhabited and uninhabited.

- Al Aaliya Island or Alia Island (Arabic: جَزِيرَة اَلْعَالِيَّة, romanized: Jazīrat ‘Alya)
- Al Khor Island (Arabic: جزيرة الخور), also Purple Island and Jazirat bin Ghanim
- Al Maha Island (Arabic: جزيرة المها)
- Al Safliya Island (Arabic: اَلْجَزِيرَة اَلسَّافِلِيَّة, romanized: Jazīrat as Sāfliya)
- Banana Island (Arabic: جزيرة الموز)
- Gewan Island (Arabic: جزيرة جيوان)
- Halul Island (Arabic: جَزِيرَة حَالُول, romanized: Jazīrat Ḩālūl)
- Ishat Island (Arabic: جزيرة الأسحاط)
- Pearl Island (Arabic: جَزِيرَة اللؤلؤة)
- Qetaifan Island (Arabic: جزيرة قطيفان)
- Ras Rakan (Arabic: جَزِيرَة رَأْس رَكَن, romanized: Jazīrat Ra’s Rakan)
- Shrao's Island (Arabic: جَزِيرَة شراعوة, romanized: Jazīrat Sharā‘awh)
- Umm Tais Island (Arabic: جَزِيرَة أُمّ تَيْس, romanized: Jazīrat Umm Tays)
- Jinan Island (Arabic: جزيرة جينان, romanized: Jazīrat Jinan)
- Al-Bashiriya Island (Arabic: جزيرة البشيرية)
- Abu Matar Island (Arabic: جزيرة بو مطر)
- Old Palm Trees Island

== See also ==
- List of islands in the Persian Gulf
