= Ali bin Abdullah Al Thani =

Emir of Qatar from 1949 to 1960

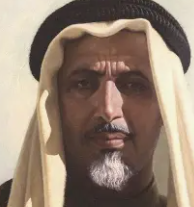
- Formal portrait, c. 1949–1960

Emir of Qatar
- Reign: 20 August 1949 – 24 October 1960
- Predecessor: Abdullah bin Jassim Al Thani
- Successor: Ahmad bin Ali Al Thani
- Born: 5 June 1895; Doha, Qatar
- Died: 31 August 1974 (aged 79); Beirut, Lebanon
- Burial: Al Rayyan Cemetery
- Spouse: Sheikha Hamda Al-Thani; Sheikha Maryam bint Abdullah Al Attiyah
- Issue: Sheikh Qassim bin Ali Al Thani; Sheikh Ahmad bin Ali Al Thani; Sheikh Muhammed bin Ali Al Thani; Sheikh Fahad bin Ali Al Thani; Sheikh Khalifa bin Ali Al Thani; Sheikh Ghanim bin Ali Al Thani; Sheikh Hamad bin Ali Al Thani; Sheikh Abdullah bin Ali Al Thani; Sheikh Khalid bin Ali Al Thani; Sheikh Abdulrahman bin Ali Al Thani; Sheikh Al Waleed bin Ali Al Thani; Sheikha Mariam bint Ali Al Thani; Sheikha Bothaina bint Ali Al-Thani
Names
- Ali bin Abdullah bin Jassim bin Mohammed Al Thani
- Arabic: علي بن عبد الله بن جاسم بن محمد آل ثاني
- House: Thani
- Father: Abdullah bin Jassim Al Thani
- Mother: Mariam bint Abdullah Al Attiyah

Styles of The Emir of Qatar
- Reference style: His Highness
- Spoken style: Your Highness
- Alternative style: Sheikh

Ali bin Abdullah bin Jassim bin Mohammed Al Thani KBE (Arabic: علي بن عبد الله بن جاسم بن محمد آل ثاني; 5 June 1895 – 31 August 1974) was the Emir of Qatar. Sheikh Ali was also the first Emir of Qatar to have traveled abroad, visiting India, Egypt, Europe, Lebanon and the Levant.

== Biography ==
=== Early life and reign ===
Sheikh Ali bin Abdullah Al Thani was born on 25 June 1895, in Doha. His father was Sheikh Abdullah bin Jassim Al Thani. He had a younger brother, Sheikh Hamad bin Abdullah Al Thani, and a half brother, Sheikh Hassan bin Abdullah Al Thani.

He became the emir of Qatar on 20 August 1949, after his father retired due to poor physical health. According to the US Consul in Dhahran, M. R. Rutherford, in a 1950 report on the prominent personalities of Qatar, he wrote "I am not in position to remark extensively upon the character of Sheikh Ali bin Abdullah Al Thani; his reputation as a boor is well established." He went on to further state, that he displayed a remarkable lack of interest in the outside world and even in his own immediate surroundings. Among the close early confidantes of the sheikh were Saleh Al Mana and several members of the Darwish family.

He is also known as the first emir of Qatar to have visited other countries abroad. His reign also saw emphasis on education and infrastructure. After his abdication, he lived in Qatar for a few years during which he was very sociable and befriended many Muslim scholars.

=== Events during his rule ===
During his reign, Sheikh Ali oversaw the first shipment of onshore Qatari oil from the port city of Mesaieed on 31 December 1949, marking Qatar's entry into the oil age.

His reign saw the establishment of the first regular school for boys, the first regular school for girls, the funding of university places and the construction of the first permanent hospital. In addition to these, Sheikh Ali also oversaw the construction of the Doha International Airport, several road networks, and water, electricity and port facilities. He also established additional government departments and ministries as well as the first joint stock companies. Ronald Cochrane was made responsible for organizing the police force in Qatar. Phillip Plant, a former British Royal Air Force officer, was appointed as adviser to the emir in January 1950. In August 1950, Britain appointed Arthur John Wilton as the first Political Officer in Qatar.

On 1 September 1952, a new treaty was signed between Sheikh Ali and the Iraq Petroleum Company (later the Qatar Petroleum Company). Under the terms of these agreements, Qatar acquired 50% of profits from oil exports. In line with the exploration of oil in Qatar, Sheikh Ali took steps to establish an effective administrative system to manage the rising economy of oil.

Numerous protests during the mid-1950s were directed at Sheikh Ali. In the early 1950s, there were many protests by dissatisfied oil workers aimed towards the oil companies. He acted as a mediator for discussions between oil companies and demonstrators. By 1956, protests appeared in Doha and started displaying a more hostile attitude towards the Emir. One of the largest protests took place that year; it drew 2,000 participants, most of whom were oil workers and high-ranking Qataris allied with Arab nationalists.

In May 1960, a cousin of Sheikh Ali attempted to assassinate him with a firearm at the Sheikh's holiday residence in Beirut. The assassination attempt was allegedly related to finances. He abdicated in favor of Ahmad bin Ali Al Thani on 28 October 1960.

=== Post-abdication ===
After befriending numerous Muslim scholars after his abdication, he started printing many historical Islamic books that were never printed before; these were printed in the Al Maktab Al Islami in Lebanon.

Sheikh Ali became diabetic in his later years and lived in his home in Lebanon, where he was taken care of by Nasib Albarbir. He died afterwards in the Barbir Hospital in Beirut on 31 August 1974. His body was flown back to Qatar, where he was buried in a cemetery in the municipality of Al Rayyan.

== Marriage and children ==
Sheikh Ali bin Abdullah Al Thani married two wives: Sheikha Hamda Al-Thani and Sheikha Maryam bint Abdullah Al Attiyah (? – 31 October 2025). He has 13 children, 11 sons and 2 daughters.

- Sheikh Qassim bin Ali Al Thani
- Sheikh Ahmad bin Ali Al Thani
- Sheikh Muhammed bin Ali Al Thani
- Sheikh Fahad bin Ali Al Thani
- Sheikh Khalifa bin Ali Al Thani
- Sheikh Ghanim bin Ali Al Thani
- Sheikh Hamad bin Ali Al Thani
- Sheikh Abdullah bin Ali Al Thani
- Sheikh Khalid bin Ali Al Thani
- Sheikh Abdulrahman bin Ali Al Thani
- Sheikh Al Waleed bin Ali Al Thani
- Sheikha Mariam bint Ali Al Thani (1942 – 21 May 2014)
- Sheikha Bothaina bint Ali Al-Thani

Ali bin Abdullah Al Thani House of Al-Thani Born: 5 June 1895 Died: 31 August 1974
Regnal titles
Preceded by Abdullah bin Jassim Al Thani	Emir of Qatar; 1949–1960	Succeeded by Ahmad bin Ali Al Thani
