= Mohammed bin Hamad Al Thani (1929–2023) =

Qatari royal family member and politician (1929–2023)

Mohammed bin Hamad bin Abdullah Al Thani
- Born: 1929; Doha, Qatar
- Died: 21 July 2023 (aged 94); Bangkok, Thailand
- Occupation: MBHHC Chairman
- Years active: 1973–2023
- Children: 9

Mohammed bin Hamad bin Abdullah bin Jassim bin Mohammed Al Thani (Arabic: محمد بن حمد بن عبد الله آل ثاني; 1929 – 21 July 2023) was a Qatari politician and diplomat. A member of the royal family, he was the son of Sheikh Hamad bin Abdullah Al Thani.

== Career ==
Mohammed bin Hamad served as Ambassador to Lebanon from 1973 to 1977, before becoming Minister for Education in 1978. He left this post in 1989 to become Minister of State for Culture, where he remained until 1995.

== Children ==
- Hamad bin Mohammed, married daughter of his uncle Nasir bin Hamad, 3 sons and 3 daughters
- Abdulaziz bin Mohammed, married daughter of his uncle Abdulrahman bin Hamad, 2 sons and 3 daughters
- Jassim bin Mohammed, 2 sons and 2 daughters
- Maryam bint Mohammed, married the Emir Hamad bin Khalifa, 2 sons and 6 daughters
- Galiya bint Mohammed, Minister of Health, married Khalid bin Muhammed bin Hasan, 3 sons and 3 daughters
- Shiekha bint Mohammed, married Saud bin Abdelaziz bin Hamad, 3 sons and 2 daughters
- Lubna bint Mohammed, married Muhammed bin Khalid bin Hamad, 2 sons and 1 daughter
- Noora bint Mohammed, married Naif bin Suhaim bin Hamad, 1 son and 1 daughter
- Aisha bint Mohammed, married Thani bin Thamir bin Mohammed, 3 sons and 1 daughter
- Ghanim bin Mohammed, married Aisha Al Nasr (Daughter of vice minister of transport). Had 2 sons, 3 daughters

== Death ==
Mohammed bin Hamad died on 21 July 2023, at the age of 94.

== Sources ==
- http://www.althanitree.com/pageTemplate.aspx?show=g&id=778&action=0
- "Mohamed Bin Hamad Holding | Board of Governors".
