= Ahmad bin Ali Al Thani =

Emir of Qatar from 1960 to 1972

Emir of Qatar
- Reign: 24 October 1960 – 22 February 1972
- Coronation: 24 October 1960
- Predecessor: Ali bin Abdullah Al Thani
- Successor: Khalifa bin Hamad Al Thani
- Born: 1922; Doha, Qatar Persian Gulf Residency (now independent Qatar)
- Died: 25 November 1977 (aged 54–55); London, England
- Burial: Al Rayyan Cemetery
- Spouse: Hassa bint Hamad Al Thani; Al-Anoud bint Faleh Al Thani; Aisha bint Fahad Al Thani; Maryam bint Rashid Al Maktoum
- Issue: Abdulaziz bin Ahmad Al Thani; Nasser bin Ahmad Al Thani; Hamad bin Ahmad Al Thani; Saud bin Ahmad Al Thani; Abdullah bin Ahmad Al Thani; Khalid bin Ahmad Al Thani; Mansour bin Ahmad Al Thani
Names
- Ahmad bin Ali bin Abdullah bin Jassim
- House: Thani
- Father: Ali bin Abdullah Al Thani

Styles of The Emir of Qatar
- Reference style: His Highness
- Spoken style: Your Highness
- Alternative style: Sheikh

Ahmad bin Ali bin Abdullah bin Jassim bin Mohammed Al Thani (Arabic: أحمد بن علي بن عبد الله بن جاسم بن محمد آل ثاني; 1922 – 25 November 1977) was the Emir of Qatar who ruled from 1960 to 1972. Qatar's financial status improved significantly during his reign as a result of the enrichment and discovery of several new oil fields. Qatar also became a sovereign state in September 1971 under his rule. He was deposed in February 1972 by his cousin, Khalifa bin Hamad Al Thani.

== Biography ==
=== Early life and accession ===
Sheikh Ahmad was born in Doha, the capital city of Qatar, in 1922 as the second son of Sheikh Ali bin Abdullah Al Thani, along with 9 brothers and 3 sisters, although some sources claim that he had 10 brothers instead of 9.

Sheikh Ahmad attended numerous royal coronations, including the coronation of Elizabeth II at Westminster Abbey in 1953.

He took the throne on 24 October 1960 after his father abdicated in his favor. Sheikh Ahmad then assumed throne and became the emir through the final years of dependency, overseeing the nation's independence from Great Britain in 1971. On the day his reign began, his cousin Sheikh Khalifa bin Hamad Al Thani was appointed as the heir apparent and deputy ruler.

=== Reign ===
==== 1963 Arab Nationalism movements ====
In April 1963, a nationalist labor group known as the National Unity Front was formed in response to a relative of Sheikh Ahmad opening fire on a nationalist demonstration and killing a protester. The demonstration had been organized by North Yemeni migrant workers who supported their government's union with the United Arab Republic. The group's formation was precipitated by public dissent with the ruling family's extravagant lifestyles and Sheikh Ahmed's long absences abroad since he ascended to the throne in 1960. Co-founded by a wealthy businessman and a tribal leader, the group soon gained popularity among Arab nationalists, individuals sympathetic to the Ba'ath Party and Qatari laborers.

They staged a mini-uprising in the central Doha market that year in response to the shooting where they presented their demands to the government. Some of these demands would have curtailed Sheikh Ahmad's power. The government rejected all these demands, and amid a tense atmosphere, many of the National Unity Front members were arrested and detained without trial. However, Sheikh Ahmad did institute some reforms, such as the provision of land and loans to poor farmers.

=== Achievements ===
==== Economic achievements ====
Sheikh Ahmad's rule saw the growth of economic activities in the country as the result of the discovery of a large number of oil fields in Qatar. In January 1964, full-scale production commenced in the Idd al-Shargi field, the first seabed field in the world to be operated entirely as an offshore facility. Moreover, in 1963, the larger field at Maydan Mahzam was discovered and in 1965 an oil terminal was set up on Halul Island. Exploration of the Bul Hannien field started in 1965 and production commenced in 1977. With the growth of oil economy, Qatar moved rapidly towards the introduction of modern administrative system. Sheikh Ahmad established the Ministry of Finance in November 1960 and Sheikh Khalifa, the Heir Apparent and Deputy Ruler, was appointed as the first Minister of Finance. After that, Sheikh Ahmed established The Department of General Financial and Administration in order to handle all governmental affairs of a financial and administrative nature. The Department of Civil Service was set up in 1967.

==== Independence of Qatar ====
Gradually the administration of Qatar began to take shape and the country moved towards independence. Following the British Labour Government's announcement in January 1968, for withdrawal from the east of Suez terminating the treaties of protection with the Gulf rulers and their failure to form a confederation of the nine gulf states, Qatar moved forward on forming a cabinet. On 2 April 1970, the Provisional Constitution for Qatar was promulgated and the first Council of Ministers of the country was formed on 28 May 1970. The independence of Qatar as a sovereign state terminating the Anglo-Qatari Treaty of 1916 was declared on 3 September 1971.

=== Deposition ===
Sheikh Khalifa deposed Sheikh Ahmad on 22 February 1972 in a bloodless coup d'état. At the time Sheikh Ahmad was in Iran on a hunting trip. After his deposition, Sheikh Ahmad lived in self imposed exile in Dubai with his wife – the daughter of the late Ruler of Dubai – and children.

=== Death ===
Though some reconciliation was achieved with his cousin, Sheikh Ahmad elected to remain in exile and died in London while getting treated for cancer on 25 November 1977. His body was flown back to Qatar and was received by the ruling family and he received a formal funeral which was attended by the Emir and ruling family and buried in Al Rayyan cemetery and a three-day mourning period was announced.

== Marriage and children ==
Sheikh Ahmad bin Ali Al Thani married three times. One of his wives was Hassa bint Hamad Al Thani. Another wife was the daughter of Sheikh Rashid bin Said Al Maktum, Ruler of Dubai. He had nine children, seven sons and two daughters.

- Sheikh Abdulaziz bin Ahmad Al Thani (born to Hassa bint Hamad Al Thani)
- Sheikh Nasser bin Ahmad Al Thani
- Sheikh Hamad bin Ahmad Al Thani
- Sheikh Saud bin Ahmad Al Thani
- Sheikha Hessa bint Ahmad Al Thani
- Sheikh Abdullah bin Ahmad Al Thani
- Sheikh Khalid bin Ahmad Al Thani
- Sheikha Munira bint Ahmad Al Thani
- Sheikh Mansour bin Ahmad Al Thani

Ahmad bin Ali Al Thani House of Al-Thani Born: 1922 Died: 25 November 1977
Regnal titles
Preceded by Ali bin Abdullah Al-Thani	Emir of Qatar; 1960 – 1972 (in exile – 1977)	Succeeded by Khalifa bin Hamad Al Thani
