= Jawahir Thontowi =

Indonesian legal anthropology lecturer

- Born: 8 September 1956 (age 69); Bandung, West Java, Indonesia
- Education: Universitas Islam Indonesia; University of Western Australia
- Occupation: Lecture
- Known for: Legal Anthropology; International Law; Constitutional Law; Human Rights; Terrorism
- Children: 3

Jawahir Thontowi (b. 1956) is an Indonesian legal scholar. He was born in West Java, on 8 September 1956. He is a lecturer in the Islamic University of Indonesia. His education background is from the law faculty of the Islamic University of Indonesia and on 1999 graduated his PhD from the University of Western Australia concerning Legal Anthropology.

He was a member of the Constitution Commission RI 2003–2004 1, and received various awards and acknowledgments. He has become a speaker in the International Human Right Conference (Custom Center for Human Rights Studies, Law School Monash University of Melbourne in December 2003)2, Delegation for International Conference on Clinical Legal Education in Cambodia, Phnom Penh in November 2005 and received a Grant to become an instructor in the International Symposium on Conflict Resolution –ICMCR, Erasmus University.

Jawahir Thontowi is a professor in legal anthropology and he is an expert on the subject. The in a resource person Indonesia related to indigenous law and even regarding terrorism. He is a key person in the development of Indonesian Law.

26 January 2010 He was accepted as the title of Professor from the Minister of Education Republic of Indonesia for his dedication in the legal science and his contribution to law in Indonesia.3

In September 2010 undergoing the selection process in the Judicial Commission Indonesia. He is rank No. 1 candidate for the peak position in the Judicial Commission. 4

== Academic Background ==
In 1976 Jawahir Thontowi graduated from one of the first Education for Islamic Judges in Indonesia established in Yogyakarta. This was a school which will become of the pioneers of legal practitioners in Indonesia. As an example the head of the Constitutional Court of Indonesia, Mahfud MD is an alumnus.

Between 1978 and 1979 became the president of the Student Representative Council in The law faculty UII and at the same time the Vice director of the Human Right Commission which was later turned into the Legal Aid Institute in Yogyakarta. In 1979–1980 become the Secretary General for Student Government Council UII then became the staff member of the community development in Muslim students association Yogyakarta. During these years he has become a prominent activist in the campus which builds the foundation of his organization skills in later life.

In 1981 he received an LLB Degree from the Faculty of Law in the Islamic University of Indonesia. Then in 1984 became the Head of Community Development Division Institute for Research and Community at the Islamic University of Indonesia. Then in 1986 took a course in Center for Research Training of Social Science, Hasanudin University. In August that year he received an Award for an outstanding field research Stunent given by YIIS and PLPIIS in Jakarta. Working in the campus and research would then lead to further development in his academic career and an opportunity to attain higher education in Australia. This was a turning point that would excel in academic career.

In 1990 he started a preliminary Masters of Arts at the Anthology Department of UWA . Then in 1992 receive a research grant for the post graduate students from the university of Western Australia. In 1998 finally completed his Ph.D. Degree in the University of Western Australia. He was ready to go back to Indonesia to implement his knowledge and skill in an Indonesia context, especially going back to campus to teach again. Upon return from Australia and going back to Indonesia holding a Ph.D. he was appoint Head of the International Department for 3 years in 1999–2001. During this time he was focusing on building and improving the law faculty and made it more dynamic. He pas the team leader in various initiatives conducted by the campus such Designing University Joint Collaboration and development then Establishing the Doctorate Program in Law Faculty University. This was a major breakthrough for UII having established a Doctorate program in the field of Law.

September 2000 he became the Director of the Doctorate Program law faculty. In September the next year in 2001 he made an initiative to make the International Program for Law in the campus which took a one-year process. For the law faculty he made two important contributions that are the establishment of the Doctorate program and the second the International program. March that year he was elected to become the dean of the law faculty until 2006.

In 2006 the election for the Rector of UII He participated in first direct election for the position being the fourth rank, Edy Suandi Hamid having 284.5 votes, Amir Mu'alim 92 votes, Luthfi Hasan, 87.5 votes. Eddy Suandi Hamid came out as winner to lead the campus. The next election for the position as the Vice Rector I to be in charge of academics it was between Jawahir Thontowi and Sarwidi which was a very close election and Sarwidi manages to be elected for the position having 309,5 votes compared to only 298,5 votes. Supporters of Jawahir Thontowi in campus still remain strong.

In 2010 election Jawahir Thontowi became in the running for the peak positions in campus again. Still competing versus Edy Suandi Hamid and Sarwidi, the election process was very tight Edy Suandi Hamid with only 32 votes, Jawahir Thontowi 31 votes and Sarwidi 25 votes. Interesting that in 2006 elections he lost to Sarwidi for the position but now in the 2010 he has more votes.

After the selection process, he returned to the Faculty of Law to continue teaching and applying his knowledge and understanding of Indonesian law. His academic career at Universitas Islam Indonesia (UII) began as a student activist, followed by roles as a researcher and lecturer. He later served as Dean of the Faculty of Law and was subsequently considered a candidate for the university’s rectoral election in 2014.

== Publications ==
Books by Jawahir Thontowi

- Budaya Hukum dan Kekerasan dalam Dinamika Politik Indonesia ; Jogjakarta : UII Press, 2001; ISBN 979-8413-76-8
- Pesan Perdamaian Islam; Jogjakarta : Madyan Press; 2001; ISBN 979-96401-0-5
- Hukum Kekerasan & Kearifan Lokal: Penyelesaian Sengketa di Sulawesi Selatan; Yogyakarta; Pustaka Fahima; 2007; ISBN 978-979-1355-20-9
- Penegakan Hukum & Dipolmasi Pemerintahan SBY; Yogyakarta; Leutika; 2009; ISBN 979-19799-8-7
- Hukum International di Indonesia: Dinamika dan Implementasi Dalam Beberapa Kasus Kemanusiaan; Yogyakarta; Madyan Press; 2002; ISBN 979-96401-2-1
- Islam, Neo-Imperialisme dan Terorisme: Perspektif Hukum Internasional dan Nasional; Yogyakarta; UII Press; 2004; OCLC 61303332 ASIN B001P9T7RW
