= Suhaim bin Hamad Al Thani =

Qatari royal and politician (1933–1985)

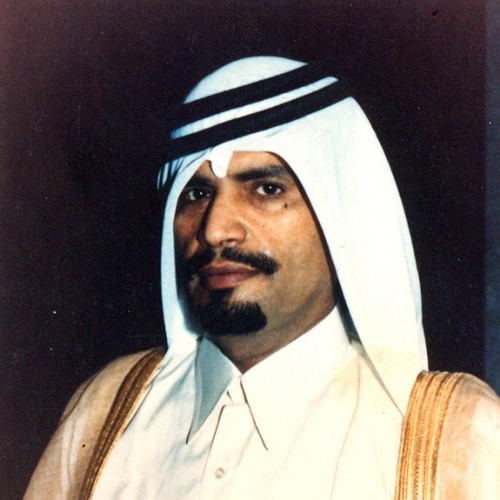
Sheikh Suhaim bin Hamad

Suhaim bin Hamad bin Abdullah bin Jassim bin Muhammed Al Thani (Arabic: سحيم بن حمد بن عبد الله بن قاسم آل ثاني; 1933 – 21 August 1985) was a member of the ruling family of Qatar who served as the country's foreign minister. His brother, Khalifa bin Hamad Al Thani, was the Emir of Qatar.

== Career ==
Sheikh Suhaim was appointed minister of foreign affairs in February 1972. He served in the post until his death on 21 August 1985. He had a great deal of participation, particularly in political, humanitarian, social and cultural activities.

In 1985, he plotted a coup against his brother Khalifa bin Hamad Al Thani after he learned that Khalifa had named his own son, Hamad bin Khalifa Al Thani, as his heir. He had his own cache of weapons and maintained a cadre of supporters in northern Qatar. After Suhaim died suddenly of a heart attack in August 1985, his sons blamed Ghanim Al Kuwari, the minister of information and culture, for not responding promptly to his calls for medical attention. They were imprisoned after they attempted to assassinate Al Kuwari.

== Legacy ==
In 2008 a fellowship fund was established at Harvard University’s John F. Kennedy School of Government for the memory of Suhaim bin Hamad Al Thani.

== Children ==
He had nine sons and five daughters from the same wife, Muna bint Jassim Al Hassan Al Dosari.

=== Daughters ===
- Muna bint Suhaim
- Rudha bint Suhaim
- Amna bint Suhaim
- Al Anoud bint Suhaim
- Muneera bint Suhaim
