= Emir of Qatar =

Head of state

Emir of the State of Qatar
- أمير دولة قطر; Amir Dawlat Qatar

Incumbent
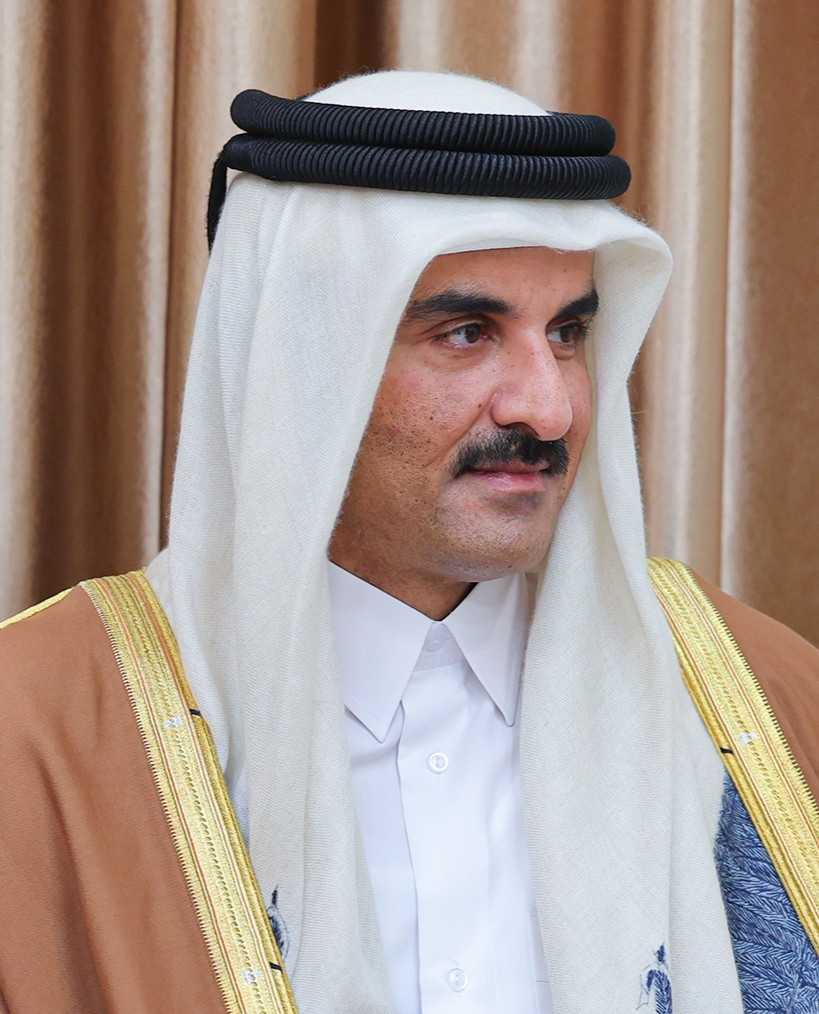
- Tamim bin Hamad Al Thani since 25 June 2013

Details
- Style: His Highness
- Heir presumptive: Abdullah bin Hamad Al Thani
- First monarch: Mohammed bin Thani
- Formed: 1851; 175 years ago
- Residence: Amiri Diwan

The Emir of Qatar (Arabic: أمير قطر), officially the Amir of the State of Qatar (Arabic: أمير دولة قطر), is the monarch and head of state of Qatar. The emir is also the commander-in-chief of the Armed Forces and guarantor of the constitution. The emir holds the most powerful position in the country, controlling all branches of state power, and has a prominent role in foreign relations.

The emirs are members of the Al Thani family, whose origins are in the Banu Tamim, one of the largest tribes in the Arabian Peninsula. The current emir is Tamim bin Hamad Al Thani, who succeeded on 25 June 2013.

== Historical background ==
All the emirs of Qatar have been members of the Al Thani family. Sheikh Mohammed bin Thani is recognised as the first ruler, having begun his reign in 1851 when he united the country's tribes under his leadership.

Qatar became part of the Ottoman Empire in 1871, although Sheikh Mohammed retained control of its internal affairs. Following his army's victory at the Battle of Al Wajbah in March 1893, the second ruler Sheikh Jassim bin Mohammed Al Thani has been recognised as Founder of the State of Qatar, although it remained part of the Ottoman Empire until July 1913.

The Ottomans maintained a military presence in Qatar until August 1915 and Sheikh Abdullah bin Jassim Al Thani signed the Anglo-Qatari Treaty on 3 November 1916. Sheikh Abdullah was the Qatari ruler from 1913 to 1949, and is one of the few monarchs, alongside the likes of Queen Wilhelmina of the Netherlands, whose tenure extended through both world wars (1914–1945). Qatar's first oil well was drilled in October 1938, and oil was found at Dukhan (Dukhan Field) in January 1940.

Qatar became an independent state on 3 September 1971 and, since then, the ruler has been styled emir.

== Constitutional role and authority ==
Qatar is officially a constitutional monarchy, but the wide powers retained by the emir and his family have it bordering an absolute monarchy and autocracy. The emir holds the primary role in the executive, legislative, and judicial branches, and also maintains ultimate control over the military.

=== Executive authority ===
The emir and his family hold uncontested control over the executive branch. While the Shura Council holds some "limited ability to offset executive power in certain areas", all its members are themselves appointed by the emir. The emir has the exclusive power to appoint and replace the prime minister and cabinet ministers, who together constitute the Council of Ministers, which is the main executive authority in the country.

=== Legislative authority ===
In 2003, Qatar adopted a constitution that provided for the direct election of 30 of the 45 members of a legislature. However, the legislature has limited powers to reject legislation by the emir and dismiss ministers, and he maintains the last say on these decisions. After nearly 20 years of postponements, the Council held its first partial election in October 2021. In May 2024, however, the country's "short-lived experiment" in electing members of the Shura Council ended with a constitutional referendum abolishing future elections. Qatar's state news agency stated that the referendum will "strengthen the social fabric in the most beautiful image and form, which honestly represents an important stage in the country's victorious march and its national unity". The Associated Press noted that the 2021 election came "about a year ahead of Qatar hosting the 2022 FIFA World Cup, an event that drew intense scrutiny from the West of the country's treatment of foreign laborers and its system of governance", and called the 2024 referendum "another rollback in the hereditarily ruled Gulf Arab states of halting steps to embrace representational rule".

=== Judicial authority ===
While the constitution makes some guarantees on judicial independence, and judges are nominated for appointment by a "Supreme Council of the Judiciary" composed of senior judges, the emir appoints all judges, and "ultimately controls the judiciary".

=== Military and security authority ===
The emir is the supreme commander-in-chief of the Qatar Armed Forces. This title enshrines his role as the ultimate authority over all military branches: the Qatari Emiri Land Force, Qatari Emiri Navy, Qatar Emiri Air Force and Qatar Amiri Guard. He also appoints military personnel and terminates their service. This power is absolute and places the entire military apparatus under his direct control. Setting defense policy "is the sole responsibility of the emir and his closest advisors", and the Shura Council has never debated security issues.

== Succession ==
Originally, those eligible for succession were simply those "within the Al Thani family", but within months of the 1995 coup that brought him to power, Emir Hamad bin Khalifa Al Thani declared changing the line of succession to only include his own male descendants. The permanent constitution of the state of Qatar, published in 2005, dictates that the emir must appoint a crown prince to be his successor from amongst his male children, in consultation with members of the Al Thani ruling family. To be eligible for appointment as crown prince, a candidate must be Muslim and born of a Qatari mother. In the event that the ruling Emir has no eligible male children, the emir must select the crown prince from amongst the eligible members of the broader Al Thani family.

The former emir of Qatar, Sheikh Hamad bin Khalifa Al Thani, appointed his fourth son, Sheikh Tamim bin Hamad Al Thani, as heir apparent on 5 August 2003, after his older son Sheikh Jassim bin Hamad Al Thani (who held the position between 1996 and 2003) renounced his rights to the throne in favour of Sheikh Tamim.

The three previous transitions of power between emirs happened as a result of coups or forced abdications. Hamad bin Khalifa replaced his father, Emir Khalifa bin Hamad, in a bloodless palace coup in June 1995 while Khalifa was on a visit to Geneva, Switzerland. Khalifa had himself replaced his own uncle, Emir Ahmad bin Ali, under similar circumstances while Ahmad was on a visit to Iran in February 1972. Emir Ali bin Abdullah Al Thani was forced to abdicate in favour of his son, Ahmad bin Ali, in October 1960.

Some official Qatari and United Nations sources say that Abdullah bin Jassim Al Thani sidestepped in favour of his son, crown prince Hamad bin Abdullah Al Thani, in 1940, assuming the office of emir once again after Hamad's death in 1948. In contrast, as of 2026, the Amiri Diwan of Qatar holds that Abdullah ruled uninterrupted from 1913 to 1949, and that Hamad bin Abdullah died in 1948 while he was "heir apparent". According to the Washington Institute for Near East Policy, Hamad "served as de facto ruler of Qatar" 1940-1948. The sources agree that Abdullah stayed in power until 1949, abdicating in favour of his eldest son, Ali bin Abdullah Al Thani.

== List of rulers ==
Name	Nickname / title	Native name	Lifespan	Reign	Notes	Image
Sheikh; Mohammed bin Thani	Hakim of Qatar Peninsula	محمد بن ثاني	1788 – December 1878 (aged 90)	1851 – 18 December 1878	Son of Thani bin Mohammed.	
Sheikh; Jassim bin Mohammed Al Thani	The Founder	جاسم بن محمد آل ثاني	1825 – 17 July 1913 (aged 87–88)	18 December 1878 – 17 July 1913	Son of Mohammed bin Thani.	
Sheikh; Ahmed bin Mohammed Al Thani		أحمد بن محمد بن ثاني	1853 – December 1905 (aged 52)	1898 – 1905 (assassinated) (after his brother abdicated in favor of him until he was killed)	Son of Mohammed bin Thani.	
Sheikh; Mohammed bin Jassim Al Thani		محمد بن جاسم آل ثاني	17 January 1881 – 8 April 1971 (aged 90)	1913 – 1914 (abdicated) (reigned for 10 months)	Son of Jassim bin Mohammed Al Thani.	
Sheikh; Abdullah bin Jassim Al Thani		عبد الله بن جاسم آل ثاني	11 February 1880 – 25 April 1957 (aged 77)	17 July 1914 – 20 August 1949 (abdicated)	Son of Jassim bin Mohammed Al Thani.	
Sheikh; Hamad bin Abdullah Al Thani ("de facto ruler")		حمد بن عبد الله آل ثاني	c. 1896 – 27 May 1948	1940 – 1948 (died)	Son of Abdullah bin Jassim Al Thani	
Sheikh; Ali bin Abdullah Al Thani		علي بن عبد الله آل ثاني	5 June 1895 – 31 August 1974 (aged 79)	20 August 1949 – 24 October 1960 (abdicated)	Son of Abdullah bin Jassim Al Thani and Mariam bint Abdullah Al Attiyah.	
Sheikh; Ahmad bin Ali Al Thani		أحمد بن علي آل ثاني	1922 – 25 November 1977 (aged 54–55)	24 October 1960 – 22 February 1972 (deposed)	Son of Ali bin Abdullah Al Thani.	
Sheikh; Khalifa bin Hamad Al Thani		خليفة بن حمد آل ثاني	17 September 1932 – 23 October 2016 (aged 84)	22 February 1972 – 27 June 1995 (deposed)	Nephew of Ali bin Abdullah Al Thani.	
Sheikh; Hamad bin Khalifa Al Thani	The Father Emir (since abdication)	حمد بن خليفة آل ثاني	1 January 1952 – 12 July 2026 (aged 74)	27 June 1995 – 25 June 2013 (abdicated)	Son of Khalifa bin Hamad Al Thani and Aisha bint Hamad Al Attiyah.	
Sheikh; Tamim bin Hamad Al Thani		تميم بن حمد آل ثاني	3 June 1980 (age 46)	25 June 2013 – Incumbent	Son of Hamad bin Khalifa Al Thani and Moza bint Nasser.	

== See also ==
- Politics of Qatar
  - Deputy Emir of Qatar
  - Prime Minister of Qatar
- House of Thani
