= Halul Island =

Halul Island حالول
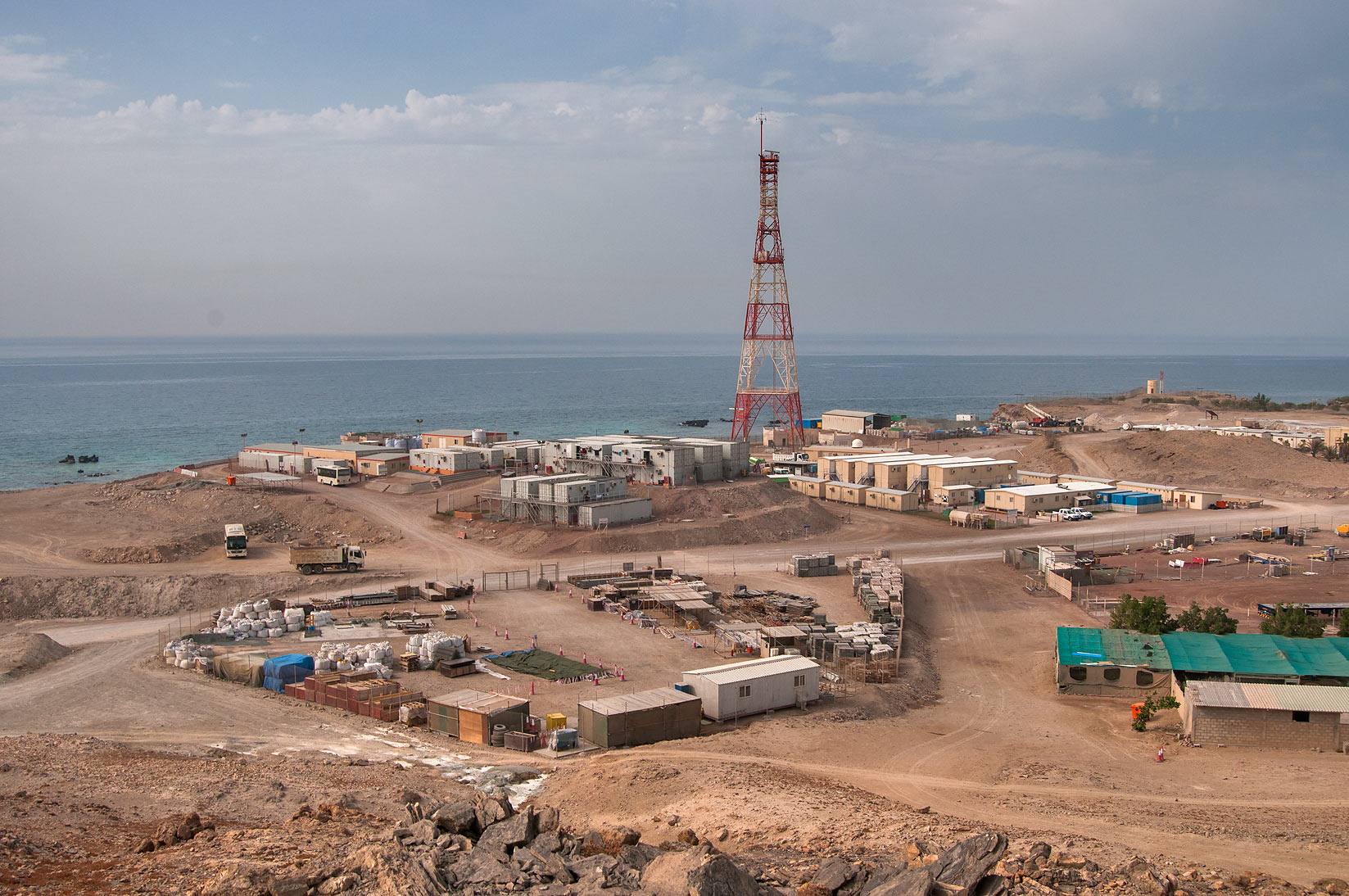
- View of northern part of Halul Island from a hill

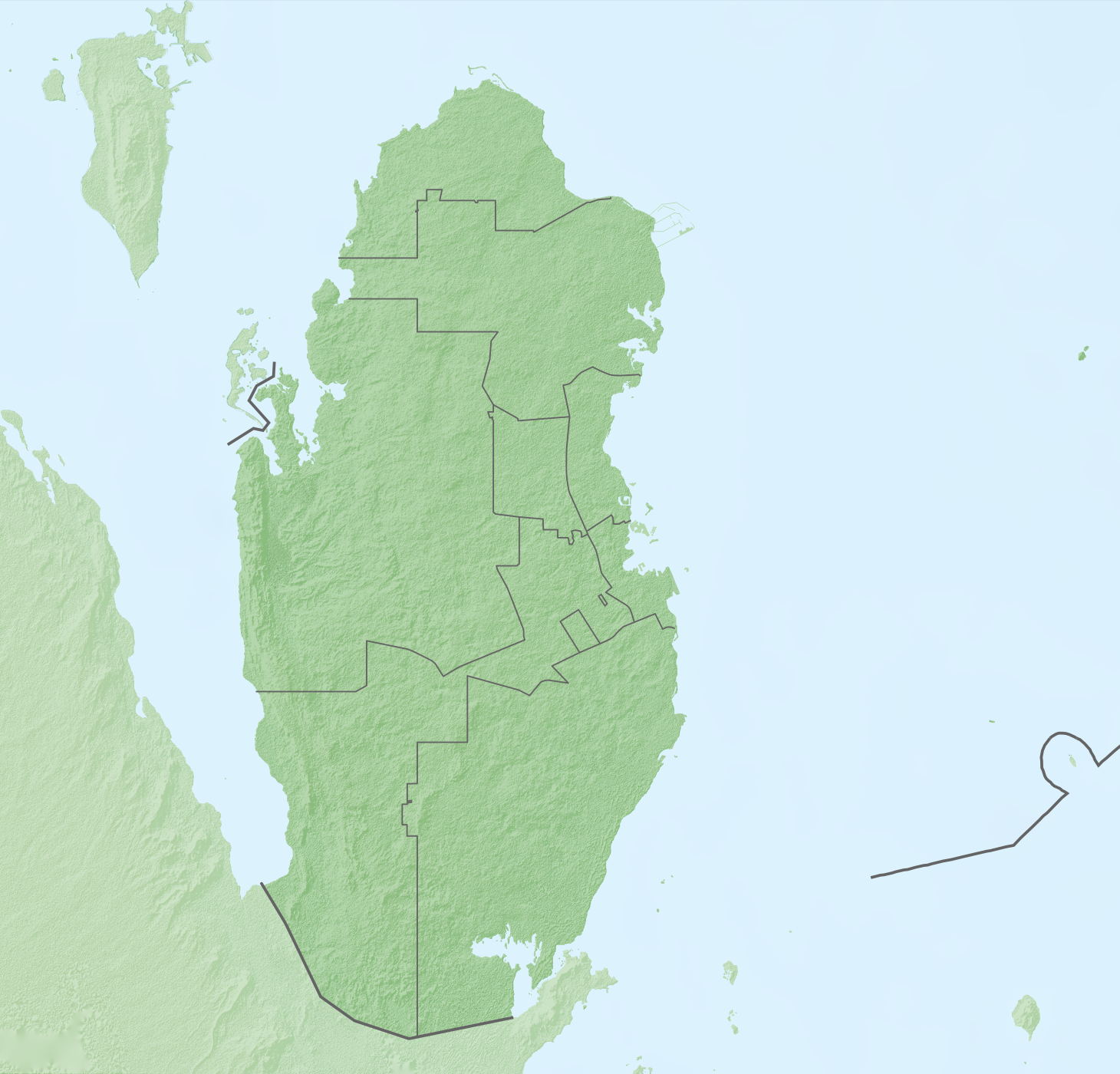
- Location within Persian Gulf Location within Qatar
- Coordinates: 25°40′30″N 52°24′41″E
- Country: Qatar

Area
  - Total: 1.57 km^{2} (0.61 sq mi)
  - Land: 1.57 km^{2} (0.61 sq mi)
- Jazirat halul lighthouse
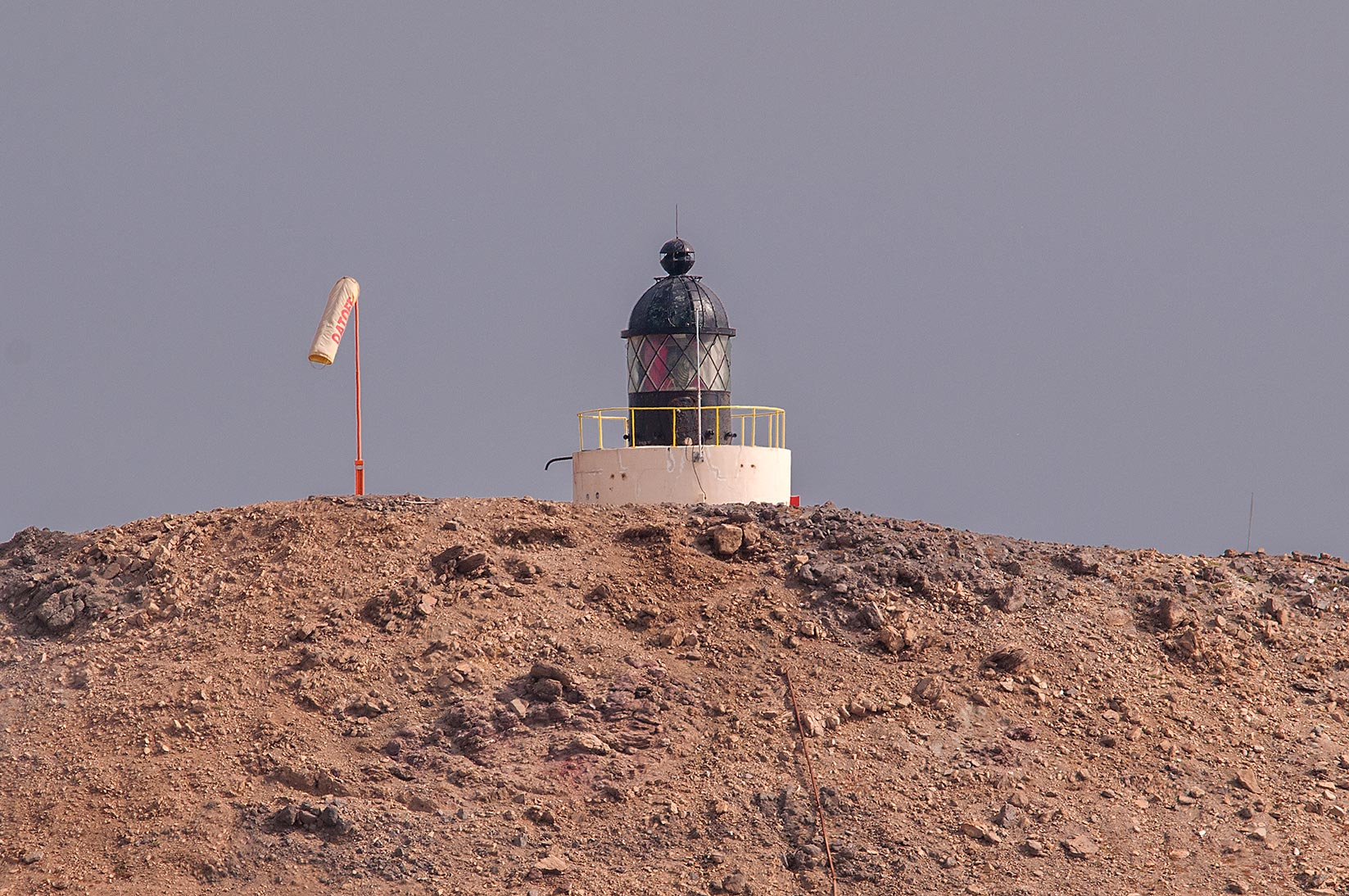
- Construction: concrete
- Height: 5 m (16 ft)
- Shape: short cylindrical tower with lantern
- Markings: White (tower), black (lantern)
- Focal height: 67 m (220 ft)
- Range: 19 nmi (35 km; 22 mi) (white), 9 nmi (17 km; 10 mi) (red)
- Characteristic: Fl WR 12s

Halul Island (Arabic: جَزِيرَة حَالُول, romanized: Jazīrat Ḫālūl) is one of the most important islands belonging to the State of Qatar. Lying about 90 km (56 mi) northeast of Doha, it serves as a storage area and loading terminal for oil from the surrounding offshore fields. One of the main bases for the Qatari Navy is located in Halul. The Coasts and Borders Security also have a base of operations on the island.

It was frequented by pearling boats in the early 1900s.

== History ==
James Ashley Maude documented the first known discovery of the island in July 1817, referring to it as "Hawlool Island". He wrote:

North-easterly direction of Sherarou Island in latitude 25°41′N. longitude per chromometer 52°23′E. bearing N. N. W. distance 10 miles, appears high in the centre gradually decreasing at each extremity; no trees and no appearance of vegetation; the water deep close too.

Maude also notes the island's close proximity to extensive pearling beds.

In 1823, the first map of the island was produced by Captain George Barnes Brucks. In Brucks' memoir, published posthumously in 1856, he gave a brief account of the island as well as its geographic location. He wrote that the island is high and noted the presence of wells. It is unknown if these wells were natural occurrences, such as sinkholes, or constructed by fishermen. He also remarks on the high elevation of the island and claims it was formerly known as May Island.

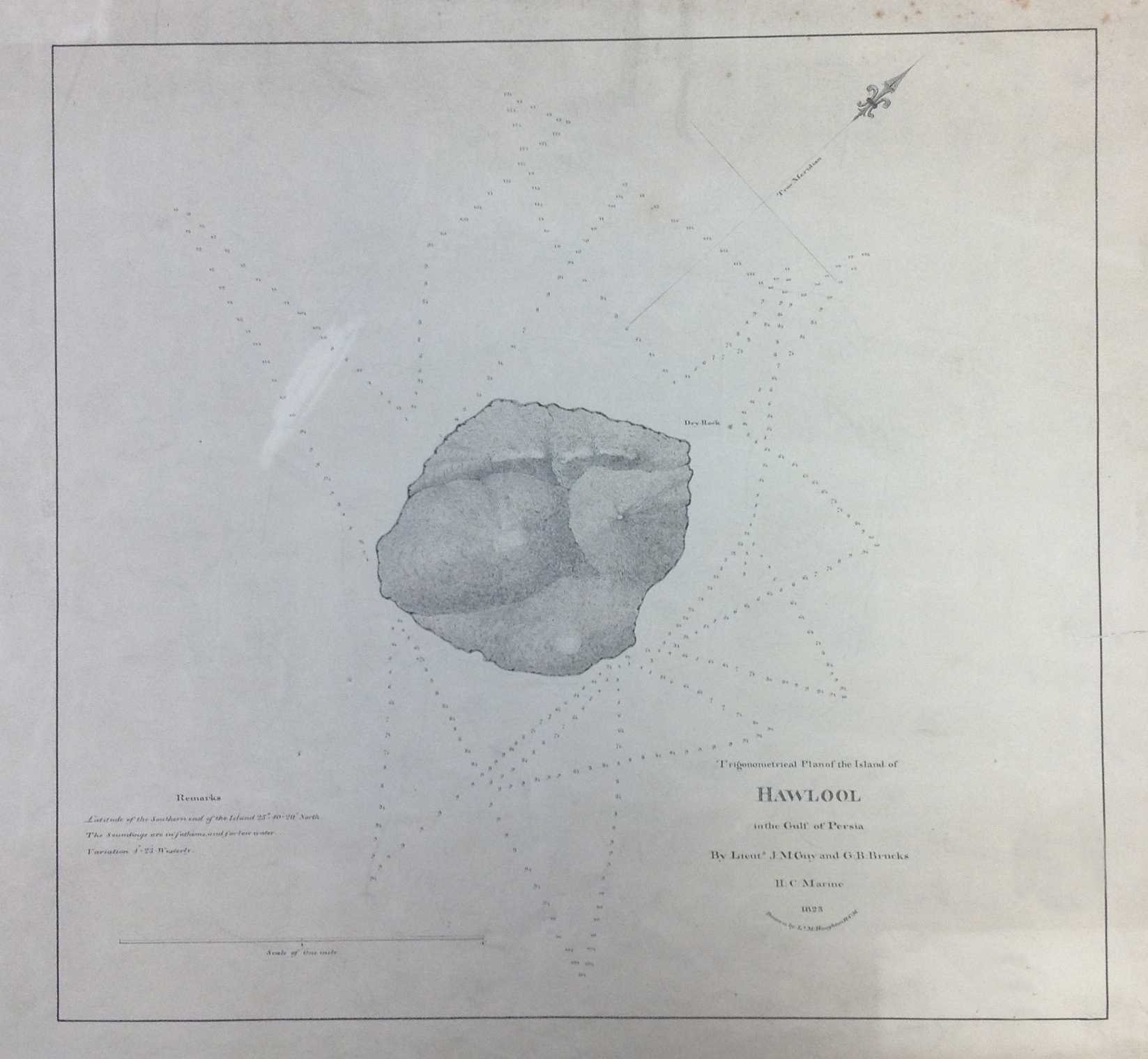
'Trigonometrical plan of the island of Hawlool in the Gulf of Persia' by G.B. Brucks (1823)

Scottish hydrographer James Horsburgh wrote a description of the island in his 1855 guide The India Directory. His account did not differ by much from the earlier description given by Maude in 1817.

Until the middle of the 20th Century, the island was used as a shelter by sailors, fishermen and pearls divers during storms or just as a resting station during their long voyages.

In the early 1990s, roughly 700 staff of Qatar Petroleum were based on the island. This figure increased rapidly over the proceeding years; in 2014, it was estimated that about 2,700 staff were based here.

== Geography ==
The island lies 116 kilometres (72 mi) southeast of Qatar's northernmost point, Ras Rakan, and around 90 km (56 mi) northeast of the capital Doha. It is approximately 1.6 km (1 mile) in length. The terrain is hilly and its highest peak is between about 54 to 61 m (177 to 200 ft).

The island is visible from a distance of about 24 kilometres (15 mi), and it is surrounded by a reef that extends up to 0.27–0.37 km (0.17–0.23 mi) offshore. It constitutes the easternmost landmass of Qatar. With a distance of slightly more than 80 kilometres (50 mi) from the nearest point of mainland Qatar, which is Ra's Abū Qarn on the northeastern coast and in the municipality of Al Khor, it is also the most remote island of the country. The island is susceptible to shamal winds. Located about 72 kilometres (45 mi) northeast of the island is the rocky and shallow Shah Allum Shoal.

=== Geology ===
Most of the island's surface lies on the Paleozoic strata. The Cambrian period Hormuz Formation is the predominant surface layer. It is one of the only two territories of Qatar which lie on a Paleozoic surface. Iron oxides such as hematite and ochre are found on the island, but have been left unexploited due to the high costs of extraction and transportation. Sediments such as anhydrites, carbonate rocks and clastic deposits accompanied by igneous rocks are found on the island. Volcanic rocks from the island were K–Ar dated in 1998, suggesting that the sediments were formed 33 million years ago. The exposed rocks on the island include dolomites composed of thin, laminae (possibly pseudomorphs after gypsum) and massive pink or purple anhydrites. These are stained by iron, and the cracks are filled with materials such as marl or other clay-rich materials.

Along with more than 200 islands in the Gulf region, Halul island is believed to have formed by salt diapirism sourced in the Infracambrian Hormuz Salt Series.

=== Wildlife ===
The island serves as a habitat for several species of marine animals, and many seabirds. Upwards of 80 wild goats inhabit the hilly interior landscape, having expanded from a group of six animals first transported to the island in 1963. The Ministry of Municipality and Environment (MME) is cooperating with QatarEnergy to protect and grow the island's wildlife. Among the most important initiatives taken are the planting of 400 saline-resistant trees, such as mangroves, and the establishment of protected sea turtle nesting sites.

== Infrastructure ==
Shortly after the commencement of oil activities, in the mid-1950s the government began investing resources to convert Halul into a major oil loading terminal. The significance of the island was further realized in the 1960s after the government began establishing offshore oil fields. Between 1964 and 1966, industrial infrastructure was constructed on the island. As of 2015, run by Qatar Petroleum, the island accommodates 11 external floating roof tanks with an overall capacity of 5 million barrels of crude oil.

Halul produces its own electricity. It has nine turbogenerators with a power capacity of 43 MW. The generators are powered using mainly sour/sweet gas fuel and sometimes diesel, although the diesel is mainly used as fuel for the island's vehicles and marine craft. Halul's two desalination units have a daily capacity of 400 cubic metres (110,000 US gal). The pump used for loading tankers has a maximum pumping rate of 75,000 barrels per hour. A firefighting pump and a small nitrogen plant are also installed.

The Qatar Emiri Navy has a base on the island.

== Gallery ==
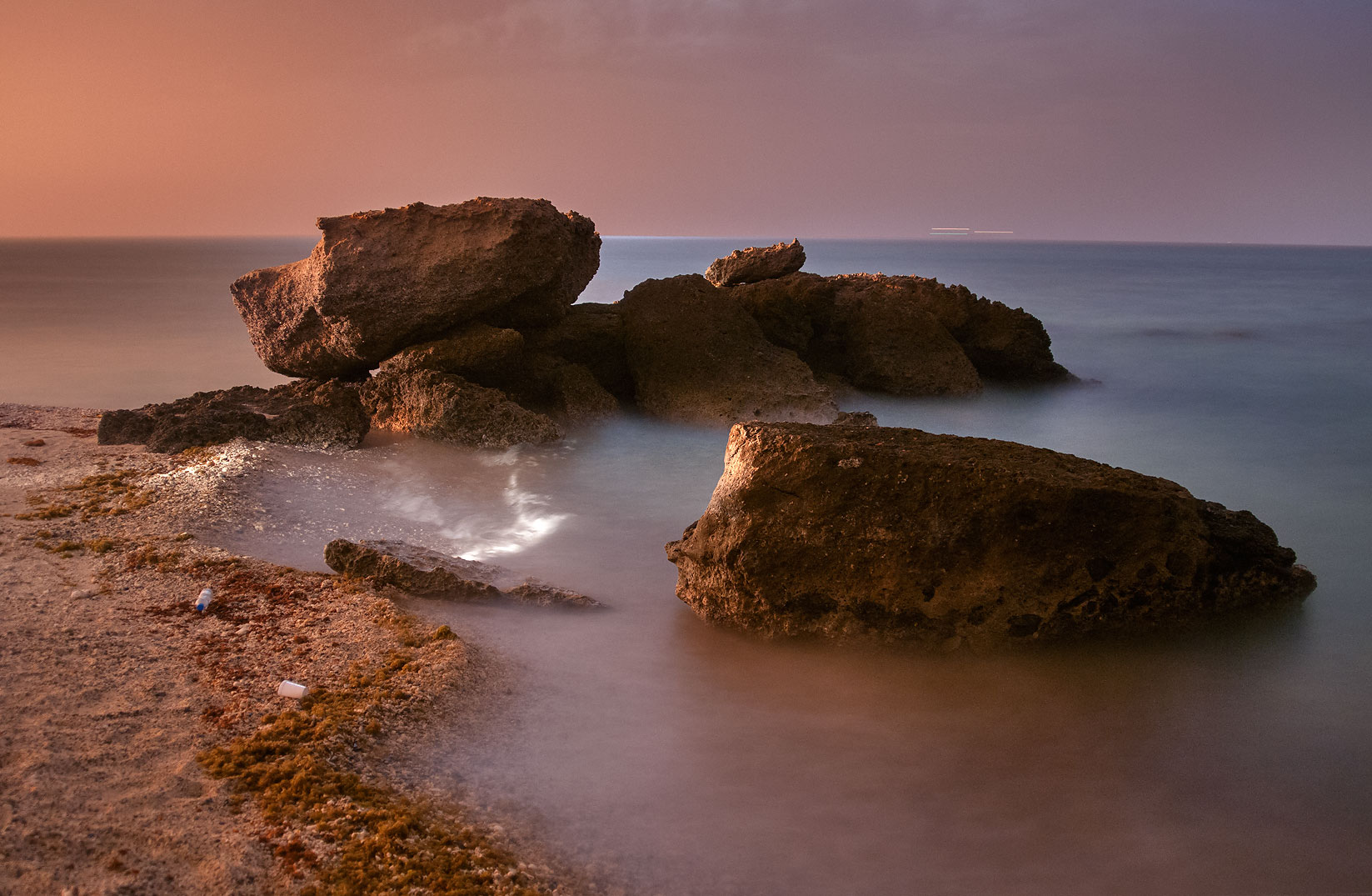
Rocks at sea illuminated by the gas flares of oil refineries

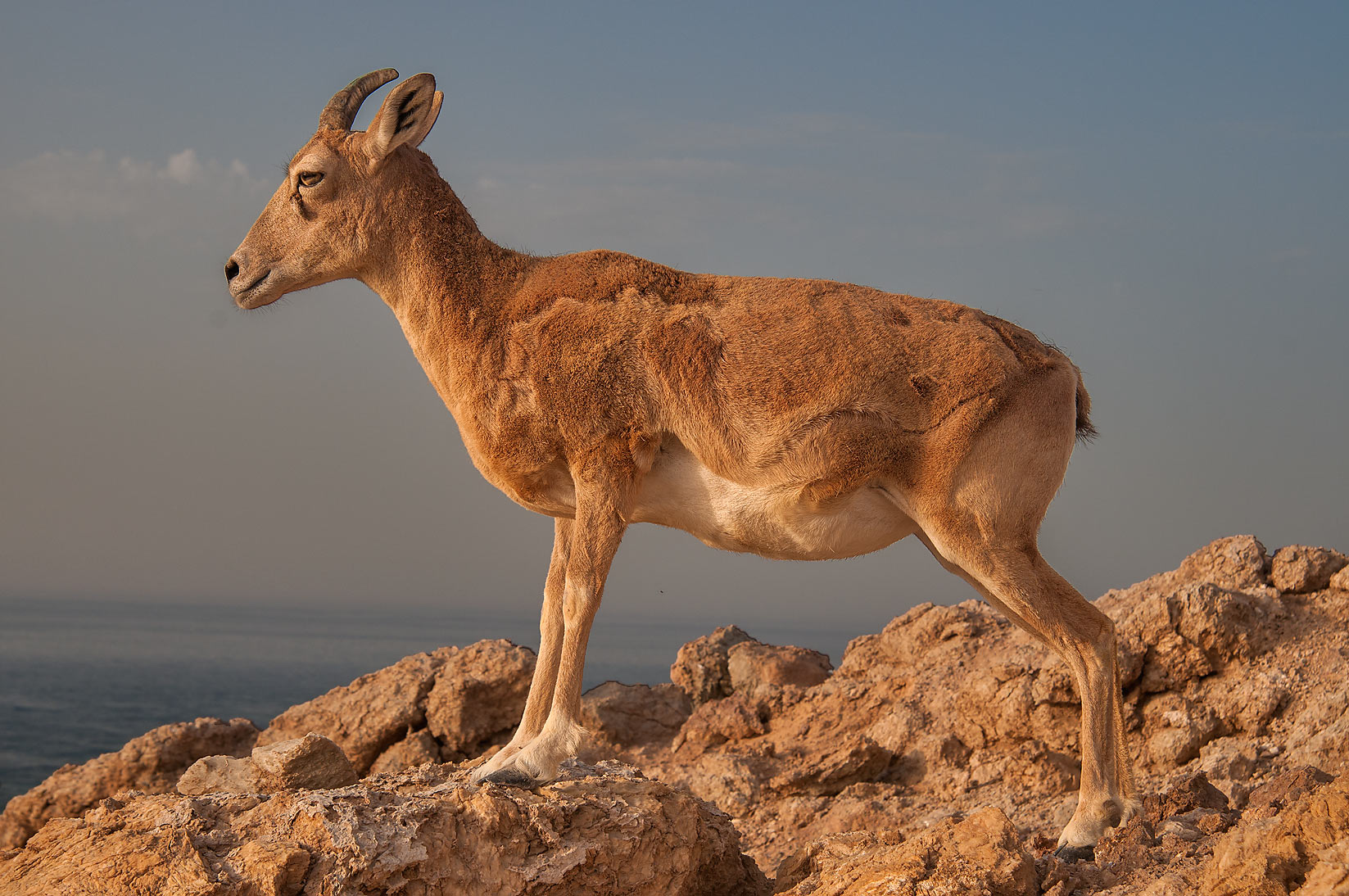
A mountain goat at the northern tip of Halul Island

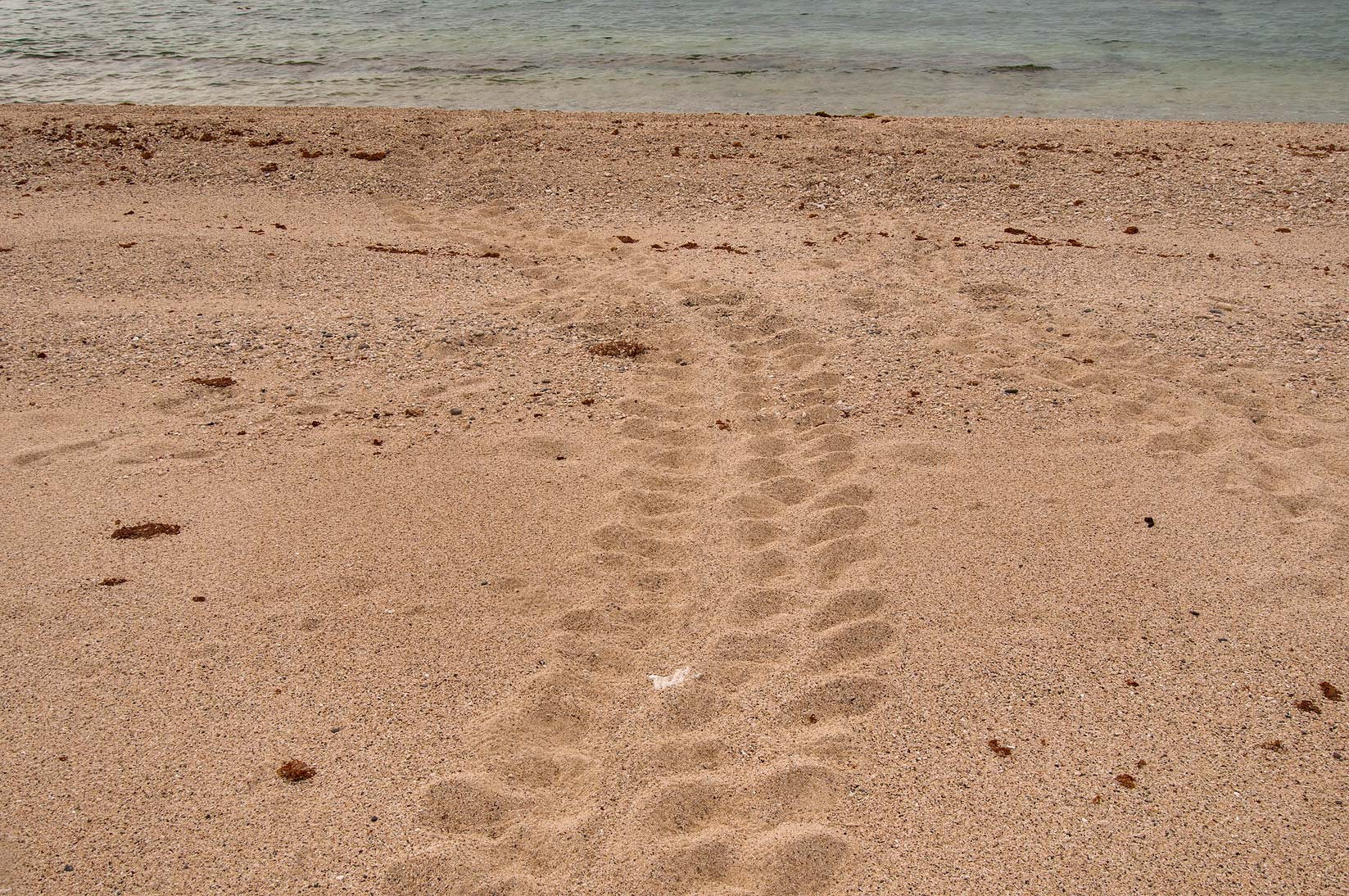
Sea turtle tracks on the west side of Halul Island

== See also ==
- List of islands of Qatar
- List of lighthouses in Qatar
