= Khalifa bin Hamad Al Thani =

Emir of Qatar from 1972 to 1995

Emir of Qatar
- Reign: 22 February 1972 – 27 June 1995
- Predecessor: Ahmad bin Ali Al Thani
- Successor: Hamad bin Khalifa Al Thani

Father Emir of Qatar
- Reign: 2004 – 25 June 2013
- Born: 17 September 1932; Doha, Qatar
- Died: 23 October 2016 (aged 84); Doha, Qatar
- Burial: Al Rayyan Cemetery
- Spouse: Sheikha Amna bint Hassan bin Abdullah Al Thani; Sheikha Aisha bint Hamad Al Attiyah; Sheikha Rudha bint Jassim bin Jabr Al Thani; Sheikha Moza bint Ali bin Saud Al Thani
- Issue: Sheikh Abdelaziz bin Khalifa; Sheikha Maryem Bint Khalifa; Sheikha Noora bint Khalifa; Sheikha Hissa bint Khalifa; Sheikha Jafla bint Khalifa; Sheikha Moza bint Khalifa; Sheikh Hamad bin Khalifa; Sheikha Aisha Bint Khalifa; Sheikha Sheikha bint Khalifa; Sheikh Abdullah Bin Khalifa; Sheikha Amna Bint Khalifa; Sheikha Muna bint Khalifa; Sheikh Mohammed bin Khalifa; Sheikha Lolwa Bint Khalifa; Sheikha Amal Bint Khalifa; Sheikha Al Anoud bint Khalifa; Sheikh Jassim bin Khalifa; Sheikha Nouf bint Khalifa
- House: Thani
- Father: Hamad bin Abdullah Al Thani
- Mother: Aisha bint Khalifa Al Suwaidi
- Religion: Sunni Islam
- Military career
- Allegiance: Qatar
- Branch: Qatar Armed Forces
- Service years: 1951–1995

Khalifa bin Hamad Al Thani GCB GCMG (Arabic: خليفة بن حمد آل ثاني; 17 September 1932 – 23 October 2016) was the Emir of Qatar from 22 February 1972 until he was deposed by his son Hamad bin Khalifa in a coup on 27 June 1995.

He died during the reign of his grandson, the current emir, Tamim bin Hamad Al Thani.

== Early years ==
Sheikh Khalifa was born in Doha in 1932. He was the son of Sheikh Hamad bin Abdullah Al Thani and grandson of Emir Abdullah bin Jassim Al Thani.

== Career ==
In 1957, Khalifa was appointed Minister of Education. Then, he was appointed Deputy Emir. He was named as the heir apparent on 24 October 1960. In the 1960s, he also served as Prime Minister and Minister of Finance.

On 22 February 1972, Sheikh Khalifa became the Emir of Qatar, seizing power from his cousin, Emir Ahmad bin Ali Al Thani in a bloodless coup d'état. While many Western news outlets referred to it as an overthrow, the Qatari population merely considered it to be a succession of power. His initial activity was the process of the reorganization of the government. He also limited the financial privileges of members of the ruling family. Next, he appointed a foreign minister and an adviser to himself regarding the day-to-day affairs. On 19 April 1972, he amended the Constitution and expanded the Cabinet by appointing more ministers. Diplomatic relations were also established with a number of foreign countries at the ambassadorial level.

Khalifa's reorganization of the system of government saw a dramatic shift in the hierarchy of authority. He immensely reduced the traditional powers afforded to the heir-apparent and gave all of the power to himself.

On 18 July 1989, the Cabinet was reshuffled for the first time, replacing most of the previous ministers and making it consist of 15 ministers. The Cabinet was again reshuffled under his premiership on 1 September 1992, expanding it to 17 members.

The state revenue from the oil sector had increased as the result of the rising of a number of production sharing agreements with foreign oil companies. Two production-sharing agreements were signed with the Standard Oil Company of Ohio in January 1985 and Amoco in February 1986. In January 1989, another production sharing agreement was signed between Qatar and the French state-owned oil company Elf Aquitaine. In the middle of 1991, production of gas in the Qatar North Field, the world's largest single field of non-associated gas (proven gas reserves of around 250 trillion cubic feet and probable reserves of 500 trillion cubic feet), commenced. While the search for finding more oil deposits in Qatar continued, Qatar built an industrial base in order to reduce dependence on the oil sector.

== Deposition ==
While Khalifa bin Hamad Al Thani was staying in Geneva, Switzerland, in June 1995, his son Hamad bin Khalifa seized power in another bloodless coup d'état. Hamad bin Khalifa accused his father of treason and demanded that Interpol arrest him. He charged his father with 4 counts that included his execution.

== Exile, return and death ==
Khalifa lived in France until he returned to Qatar in 2004 to attend to the funeral of his wife Sheikha Moza bint Ali Al Thani. He was received by Emir Hamad bin Khalifa Al Thani and his crown prince Tamim bin Hamad Al Thani. This marked his return to Qatar after nine years in exile. He died on 23 October 2016 at the age of 84. Qatar declared 3 days of national mourning after his death.

== Marriages and children ==
Sheikh Khalifa had five sons and thirteen daughters from four wives.

- Sheikha Amna bint Hassan bin Abdullah Al Thani
  - Sheikh Abdelaziz bin Khalifa, Petroleum and finance minister (1972–1992)
  - Sheikha Maryem Bint Khalifa
  - Sheikha Noora bint Khalifa
  - Sheikha Hissa bint Khalifa
  - Sheikha Jafla bint Khalifa
  - Sheikha Moza bint Khalifa
- Sheikha Aisha bint Hamad Al Attiyah
  - Sheikh Hamad bin Khalifa, Emir of Qatar from 1995 to 2013.
- Sheikha Rudha bint Jassim bin Jabr Al Thani
  - Sheikha Aisha Bint Khalifa
  - Sheikha Sheikha bint Khalifa
  - Sheikh Abdullah Bin Khalifa
  - Sheikha Amna Bint Khalifa
  - Sheikha Muna bint Khalifa
  - Sheikh Mohammed bin Khalifa
  - Sheikha Lolwa Bint Khalifa
  - Sheikha Amal Bint Khalifa
  - Sheikha Al Anoud bint Khalifa
- Sheikha Moza bint Ali bin Saud Al Thani
  - Sheikh Jassim bin Khalifa
  - Sheikha Nouf bint Khalifa

Khalifa bin Hamad Al Thani House of Al-Thani Born: 1932 Died: 23 October 2016
Regnal titles
Preceded by Ahmad bin Ali Al Thani	Emir of Qatar; 1972–1995	Succeeded by Hamad bin Khalifa Al Thani
