= Al Muhannadi =

Arab confederation

The Al Mohannadi (Arabic: المهندي, also spelled Al-Muhannadi) tribe is an Arab tribal confederation based primarily in the Arab states of the Persian Gulf, especially in Qatar. The tribal confederation emerged in the coastal town of Al-Khor, ruling the region before Qatar gained its independence in 1971, the larger portion of its members belong to the Bani Hajer, a Qahtanite tribe. It is also known as Al-Mahanda (Arabic: المهاندة). The leading family of the tribe was the Al-Misnid family. The other families are Al-Bin Ali, Al-Ibrahim, Al-Shugari, Al-Matwi of Al-Shugari, Al-Kashashi, Al-Hassan, Al-Baduh, Al-Bin Matar, and Al-Mehre.

== History ==
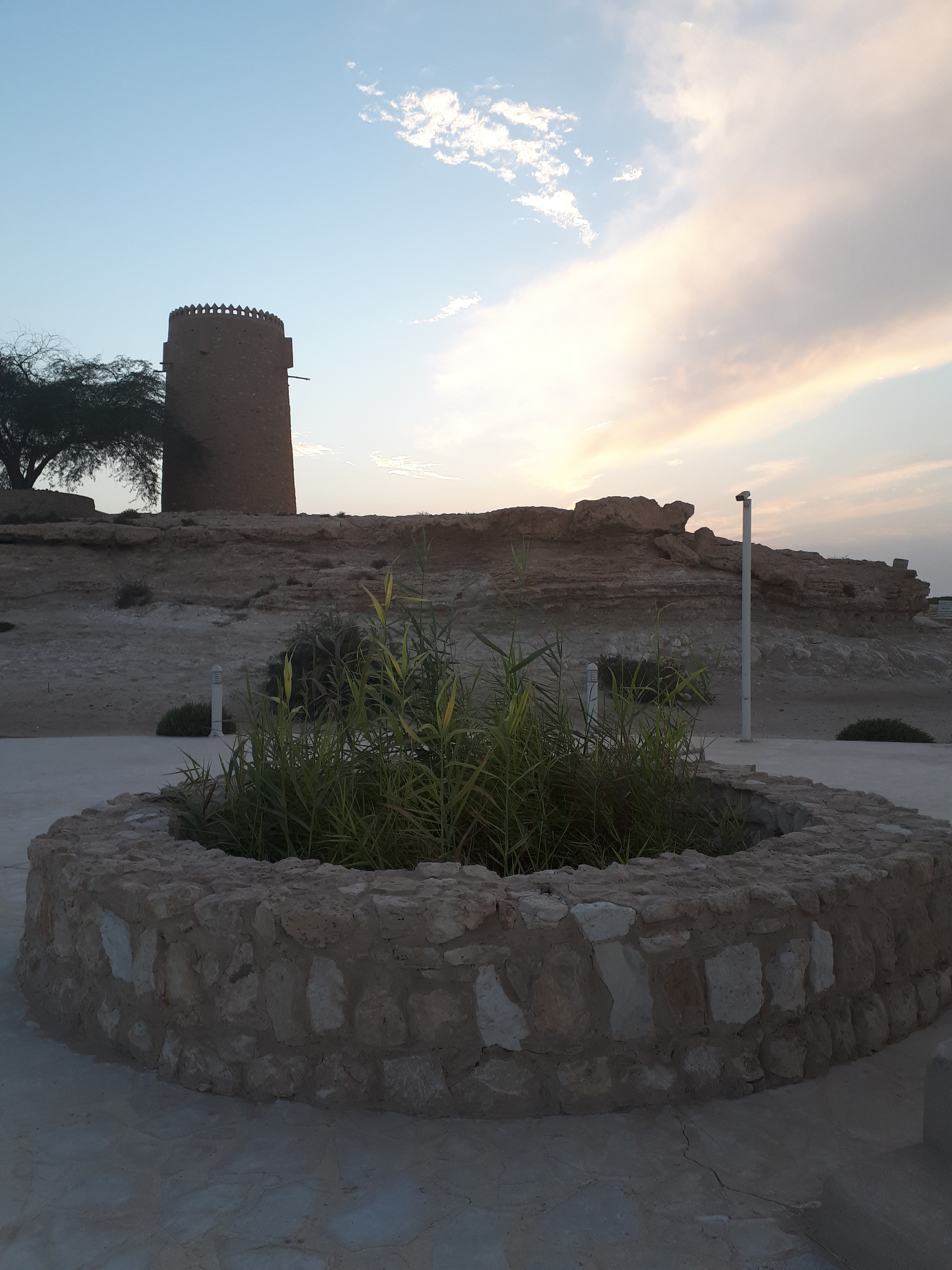
The historic Ain Hleetan Well constructed by the Al Muhannadi

The formation of the Al-Mohannadi Arab tribal confederacy likely involved a collective agreement among various families to defend the villages of Al Thakhira and Al-Khor.

Mustafa Murad Al-Dabbagh mentioned in his book, Qatar, Its Past and Present, that the city of Al-Khor was established in 1200 AH (1785–1786 AD), and its population in the middle of the last century reached more than 2,000 people, belonging to the Al-Muhanada tribe, whose leaders were known as Al-Misanada.

The settlement expanded its borders after one of their hunting groups discovered a substantial water source near the coast in the mid-19th century. This led them to construct the Ain Hleetan Well, which helped sustain the villagers' basic needs. Some locals believed that water obtained from the well possessed medicinal properties. In turn, the villagers built the Al Khor Towers around 1900, to defend both the well and its harbor.

=== John Gordon Lorimer ===
In 1908, J. G. Lorimer, a British historian, compiled his two-volume encyclopedia, the "Gazetteer of the Persian Gulf, Oman and Central Arabia" in which he wrote that Al Khor was frequently referred to as 'Khor al-Mahandah [Mohannadi]'. He also wrote that the village consisted of 400 stone and mud houses belonging to the tribe. They also settled the nearby village of Al Thakhira. In 1908, Lorimer noted that the village comprised 100 houses of the Al Mohannadi tribe.

J. G. Lorimer also noted that in 1908 there were 80 pearl boats, 90 sea-going vessels, and 30 fishing boats, just 13 km (8 mi) north of Al-Khor. The maritime activities of the Al-Mohannadi contributed to Qatar’s economy and trade relations with neighboring regions.

== Folklore ==
=== May and Gilan ===
A tale from the Al Mohannadi tribe tells the story of a man with many pearling boats and his rival May who had even more, they competed over pearls until Ghilan inspired by a grasshopper's wings invented the sail which allowed him to reach pearl beds faster than May.

This story is known mainly in Al Khor and reflects the Al Mohannadi tribe's maritime heritage.
