= Al Khor (city) =

Al-Khor الخور
- City
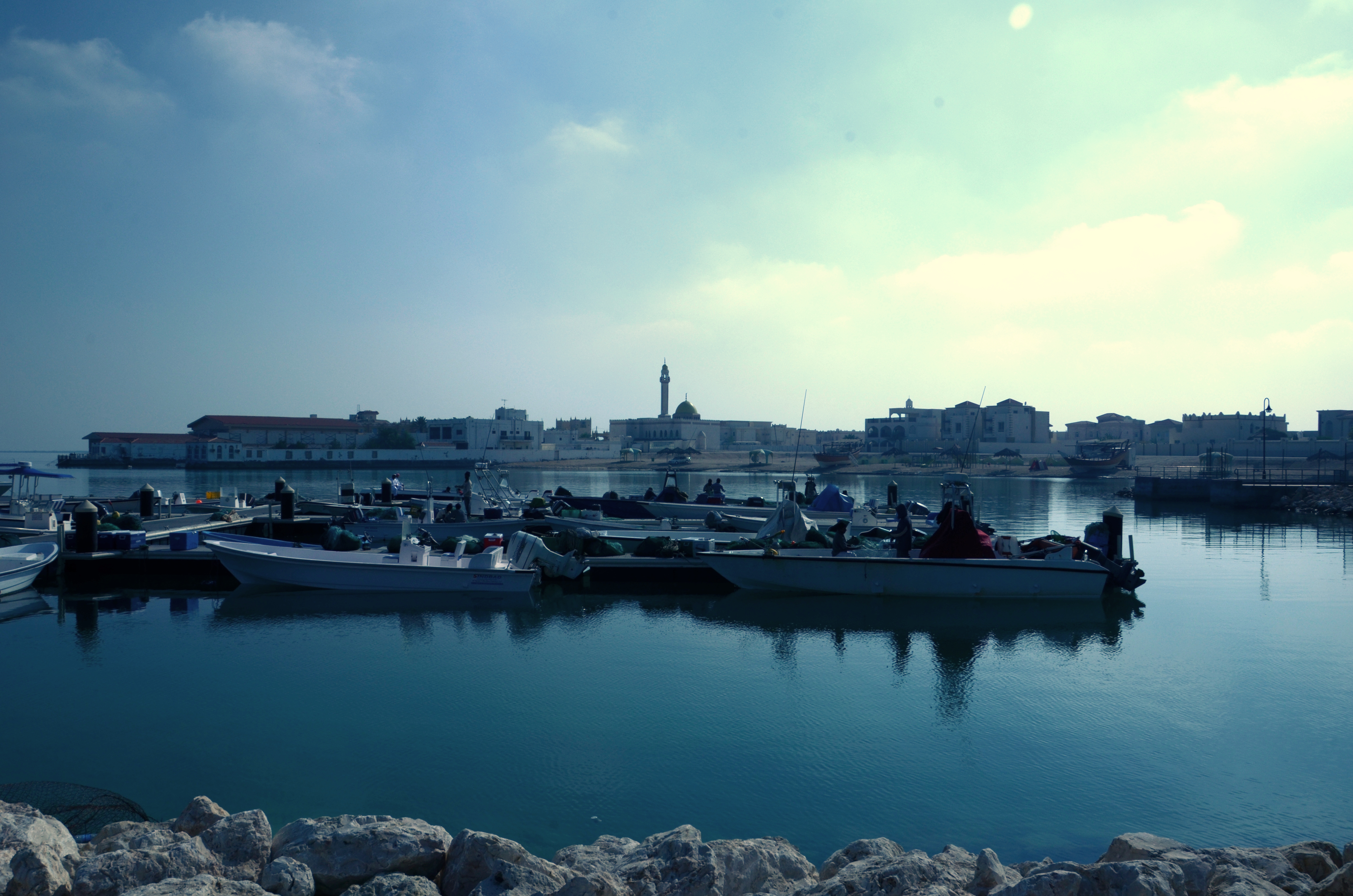
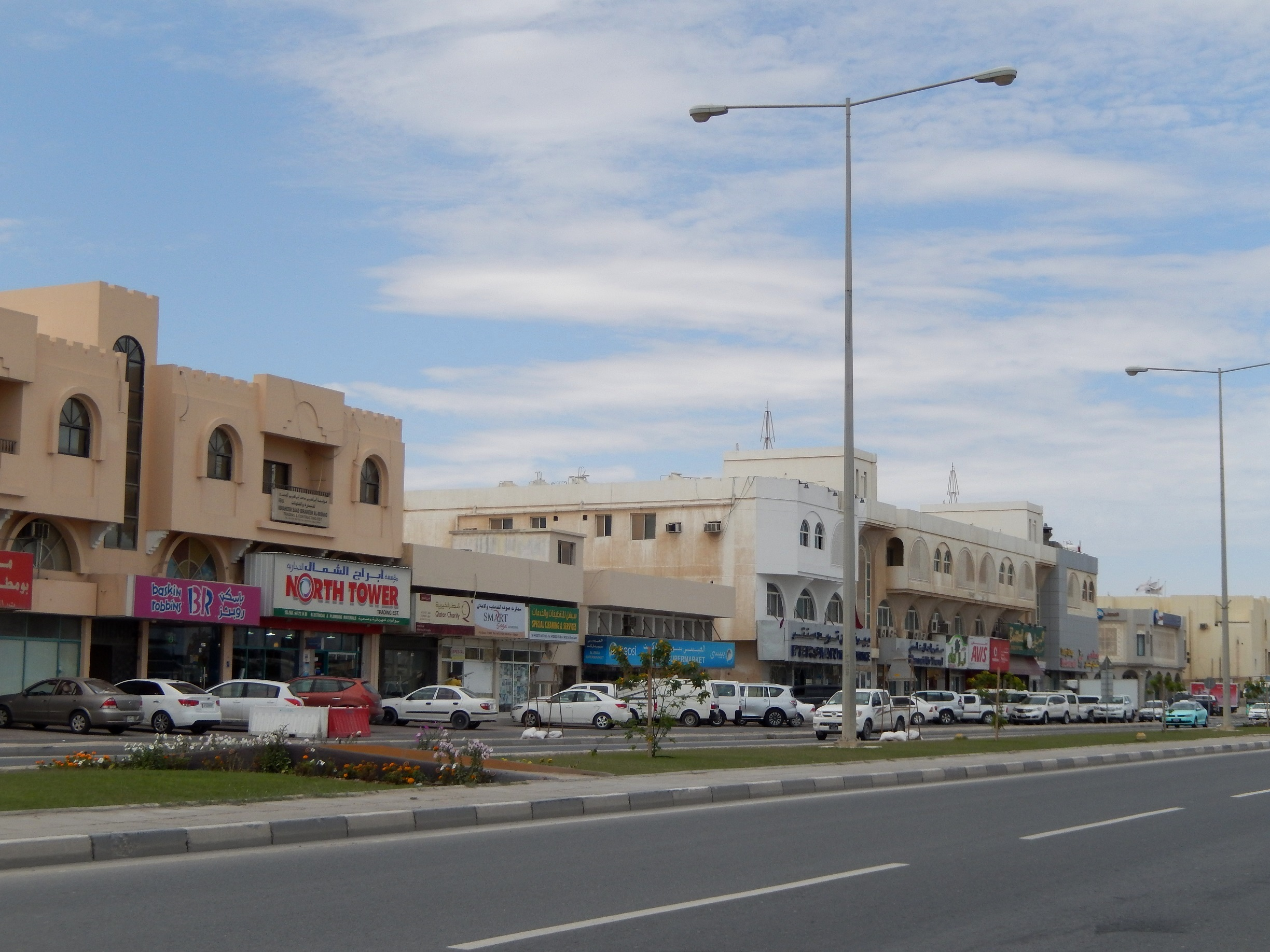
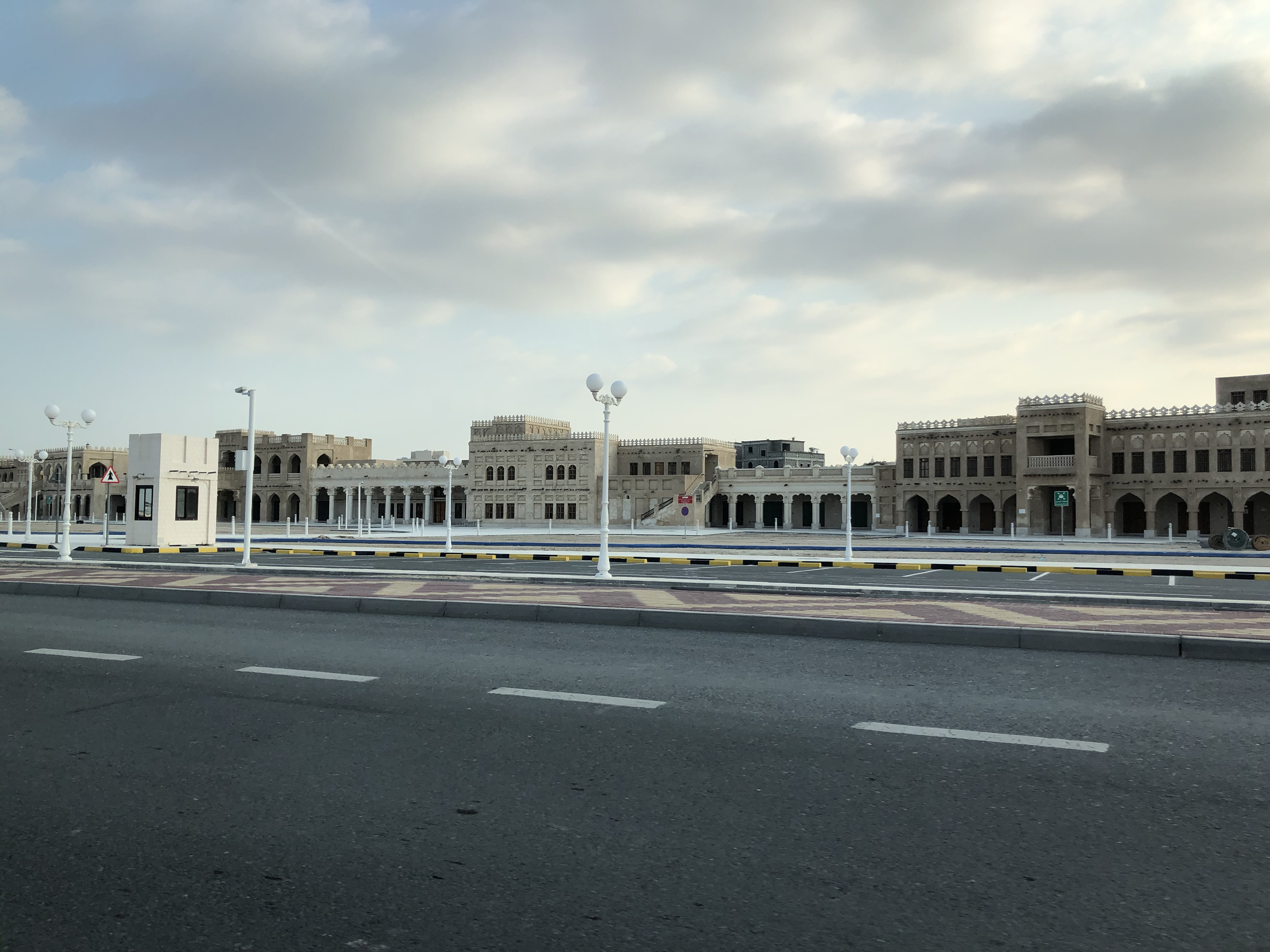
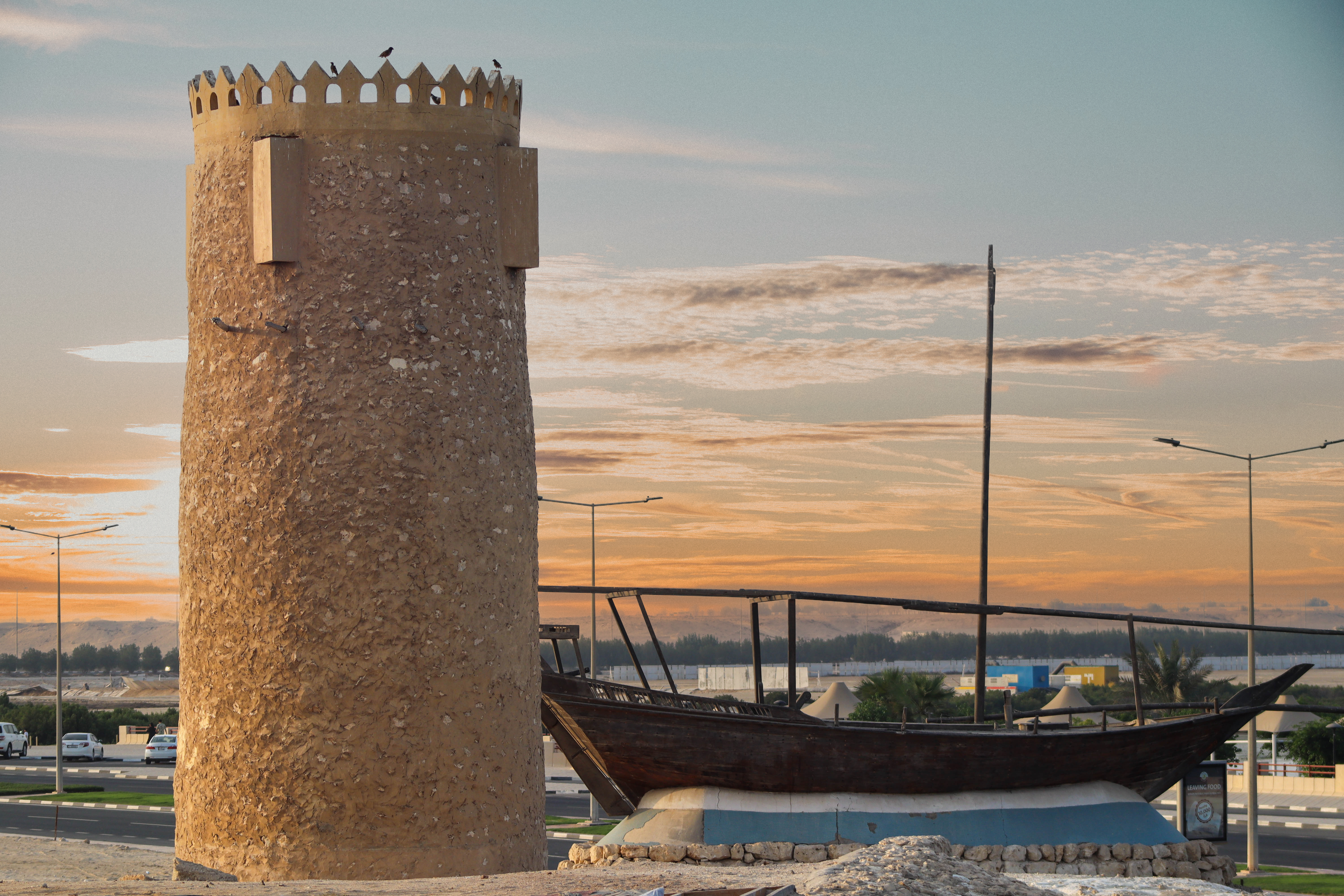
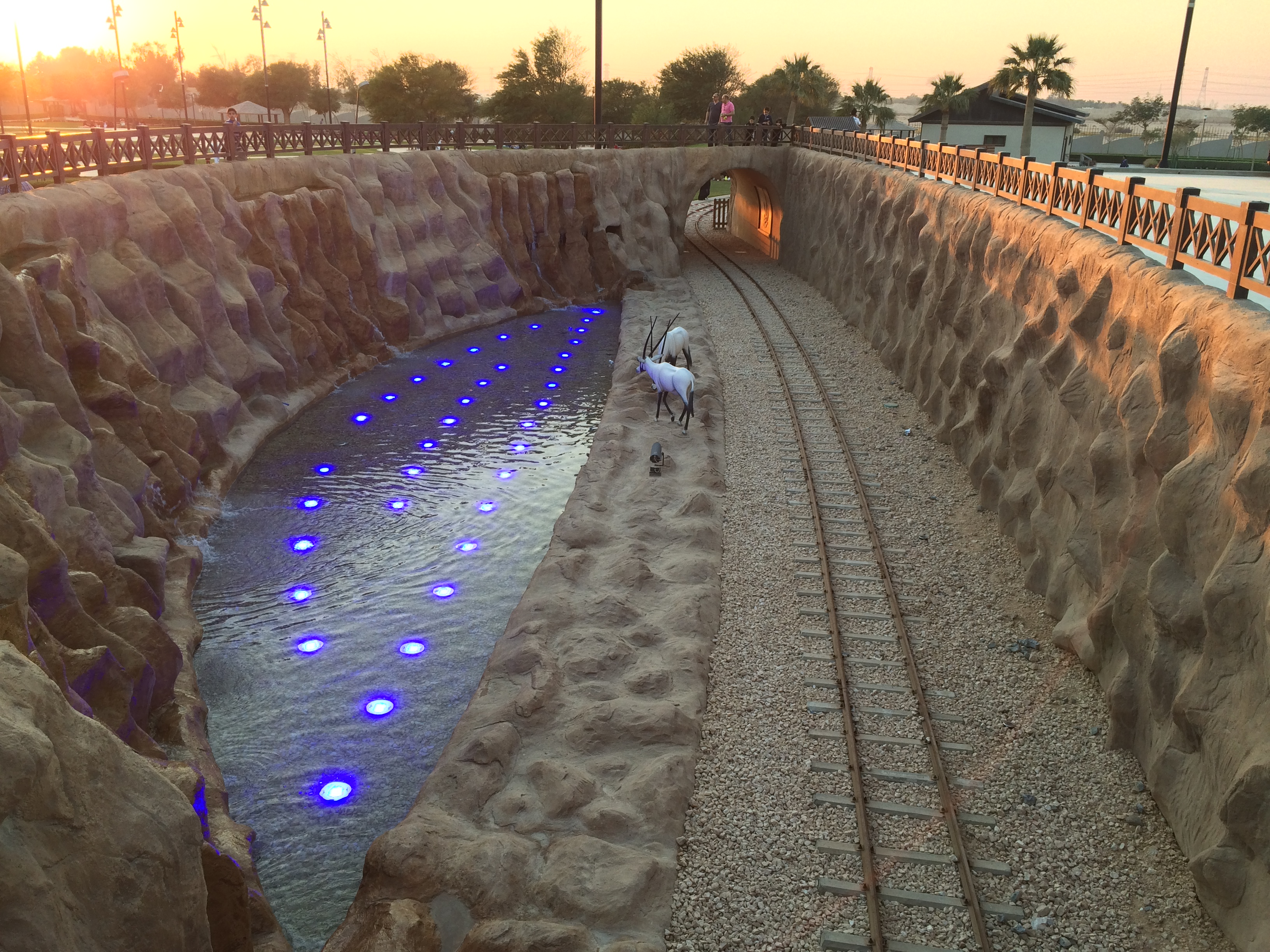
- Al Khor Harbor Al Thakhira Road Souq Waqif Al Khor One of the three Al Khor Towers Al Khor Park Al Bayt Stadium

- Location in Qatar
- Coordinates: 25°41′24″N 51°30′36″E
- Country: Qatar
- Municipality: Al Khor Municipality
- Zone: Zone 74
- District no.: 269

Area
  - Urban: 4.4 sq mi (11.4 km^{2})

Population (2021)
  - City: 61,877
- Time zone: UTC+3 (AST)

Al Khor (Arabic: الخور, romanised: Al Khawr) is a coastal city in northeast Qatar, located 50 kilometres (31 mi) north of the capital Doha. Considered one of Qatar's largest cities, it is the capital of the municipality of Al Khor and Al Thakhira. Dating back to the 18th century, it is one of Qatar's oldest settlements. The name of the city, meaning creek in Arabic, emerged because the original settlement was built on a creek. Until the mid-1900s, it was known as Khor Al Shaqiq.

Originally a fishing and pearling village, much of Al Khor's recent growth has been due to its proximity to Qatar's northern oil and natural gas fields and to Ras Laffan Industrial City. Along with the neighbouring Al Khor Community, it hosts a large number of oil workers. Al Khor Island, an important archaeological and tourist site, is northeast of the city. It was also the venue for the opening game of the 2022 FIFA World Cup.

== History ==
=== Initial settlement ===
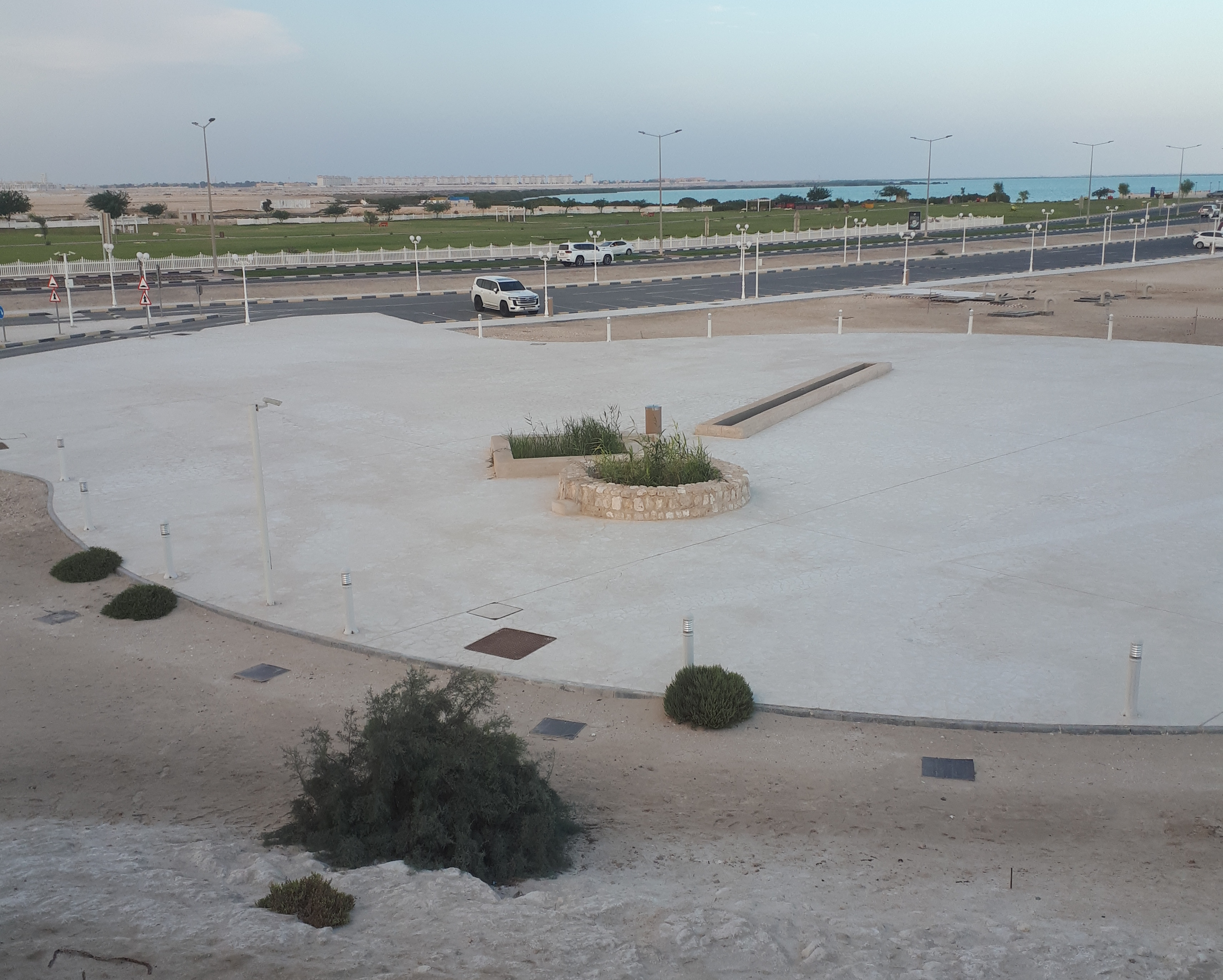
Far view of the Ain Hleetan Well

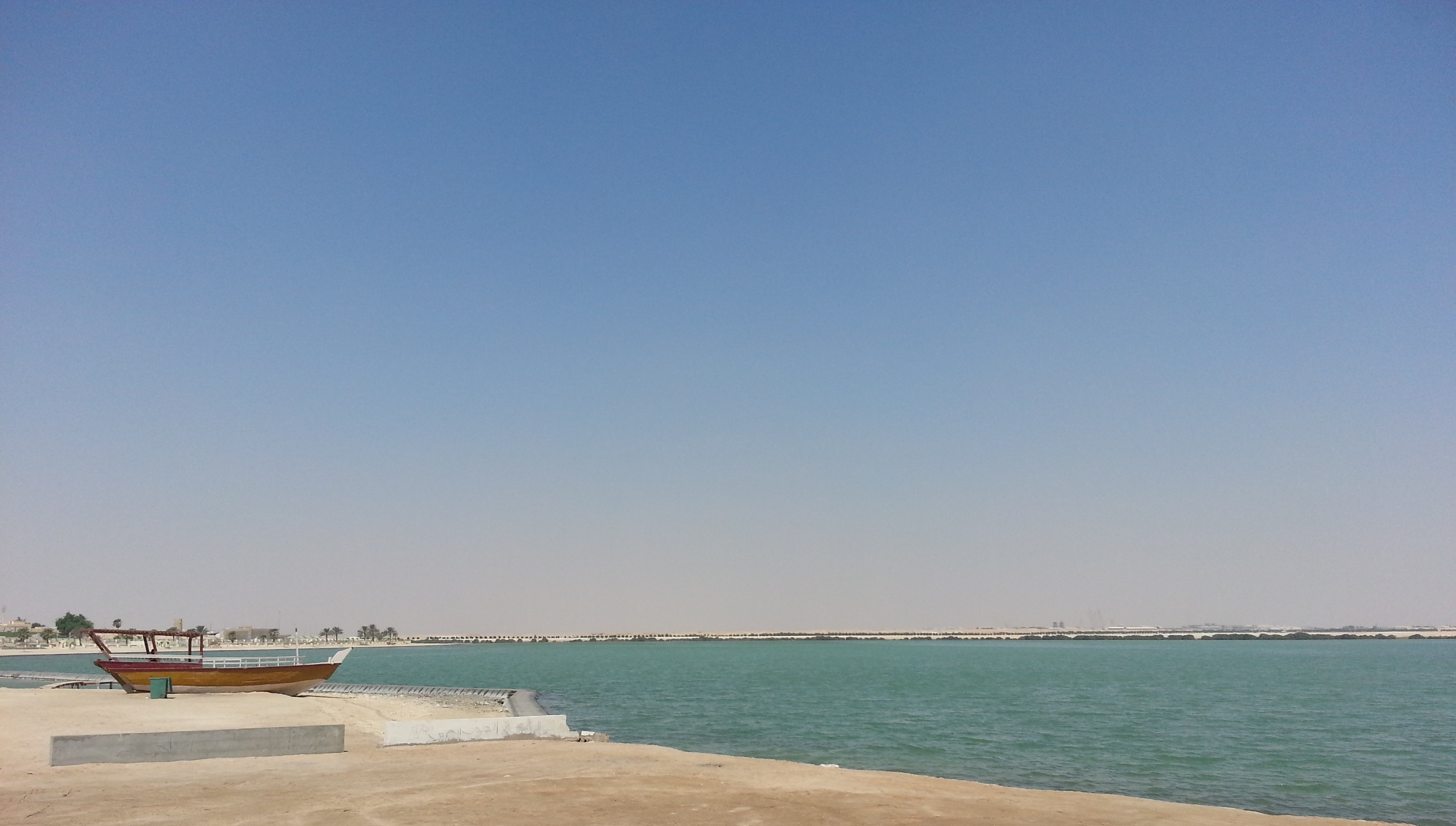
The Persian Gulf as seen from Al Khor Corniche

According to oral tradition, Al Khor was first settled by members of the Al Muhannadi tribe in the mid-18th century, possibly around 1750, making it one of the oldest settlements in the country. Various versions of the story exist, but one version states that two nomadic Al Muhannadi tribesmen, Mohammed bin Baddah and Majid Al Shuqairi, had gone in search of their missing camels. While searching, they discovered a stream of fresh water in a depression underneath a high ground, later to be known as Ain Hleetan. Further exploration also unveiled a suitable docking platform on a shallow tidal creek, which led to the area being settled by the whole of the Al Muhannadi tribe after relocating from their home in Al Khuwayr in northeast Qatar. According to an alternative version of this story, the two cousins stumbled upon Al Khor after unsuccessfully chasing down a hare, rather than searching for their lost camels.

It was decided that the name of the town would be prefixed with khor, which is the Arabic translation of "creek"; but multiple names were used in the settlement's initial stages. The two most popular names were 'Khor Al Muhanadah', named after the founding tribe, and 'Khor Al Shaqiq', which is named after the incision in the wood used in constructing sailboats, a craft for which the settlement was well known. Of these two, 'Khor Al Shaqiq' was the more commonly used variant. Carsten Niebuhr, an 18th-century German explorer who visited the Arabian Peninsula, created one of the first maps to depict the settlements of Qatar in 1765 in which he denoted Adsjar, possibly referring to Al Khor.

Primarily a pearl diving and fishing village, the majority of activity took place during the summer when the pearling season was in full swing. During the winter, the nomadic tribesmen would rear livestock throughout the interior. The locals fetched their drinking water from a well known as Ain Al Jahsha, located about 10 km (6.2 mi) to the west of the settlement. Another closer-by water source, Ain Hleetan, was also used by the residents, and some even believed that water obtained from Ain Hleetan possessed medicinal properties, leading it to gain the moniker of "the doctor".

=== 19th century ===
In the 1820s, George Barnes Brucks carried out the first British survey of the Persian Gulf. He recorded the following notes about Al Khor, which he referred to as Khore Sheditch: "Khore Sheditch is a small boat harbour, to the southward of Ras Mut Buck, having from one and a half to two and a half fathoms water in it; its entrance is in lat. 25° 40' 10' N., long. 51° 34' 50' E. The point at the entrance of Khore Aegarah is in lat. 25° 43' 10" N., long. 51° 36' 40" E. The Khore is small, having only one fathom in it."

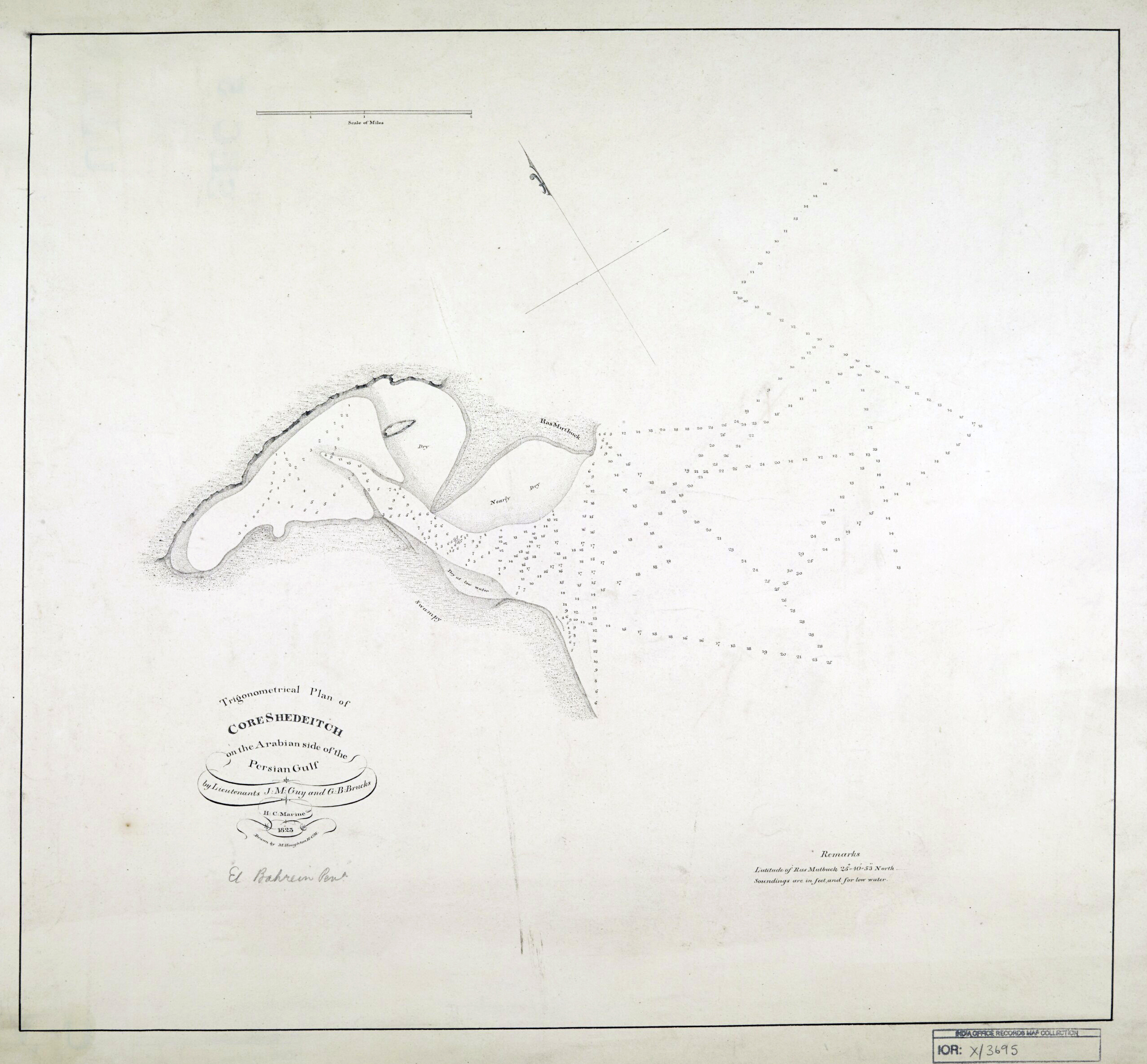
‘Trigonometrical plan of Core Shedeitch [Khor Shaqiq] on the Arabian side of the Persian Gulf’ by G.B. Brucks (1823)

In the 19th century, several other tribes within the country began migrating to Khor Al Shaqiq as a result of its reputation and its well-known spring, Ain Hleetan. The two main tribes, Shahwan and Bani Hajer, soon intermarried with the Al Muhannadi tribe and formed new families, including the Al-Baddha, Al-Missned, Al-Hassan and Al Arbeed. Further migrants came from the Utub, Al Manasir, and Al Dawasir, as well as immigrants from Persia and Najd. As a result, Khor Al Shaqiq represented a wide range of cultures and ethnicities at the time. Around 1850, many of these tribes united to form the Al Muhannadi tribal confederation.

In 1871, the Ottoman Empire expanded its reach into Eastern Arabia. After establishing themselves on Al-Hasa coast, they advanced towards Qatar. Abdullah II Al-Sabah of Kuwait was sent to the town to secure a landing for the Ottoman troops, bringing with him four Ottoman flags for the most influential personages in Qatar. One of these flags was destined for Ali bin Abdul Aziz, the ruler of Khor Al Shaqiq.

For defensive purposes, in the 1890s Sheikh Jassim bin Mohammed Al Thani ordered all of Qatar's northernmost settlements, including Al Khuwayr and Ar Ru'ays, to be evacuated and its inhabitants moved to Al Bidda, Al Wakrah and Khor Al Shaqiq, leading to a considerable size increase for the village.

=== 20th century ===
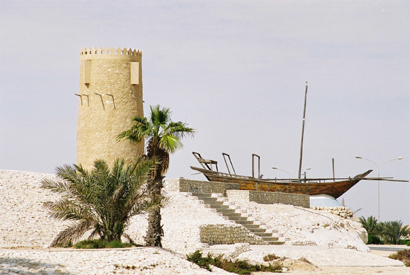
One of the surviving Al Khor Towers

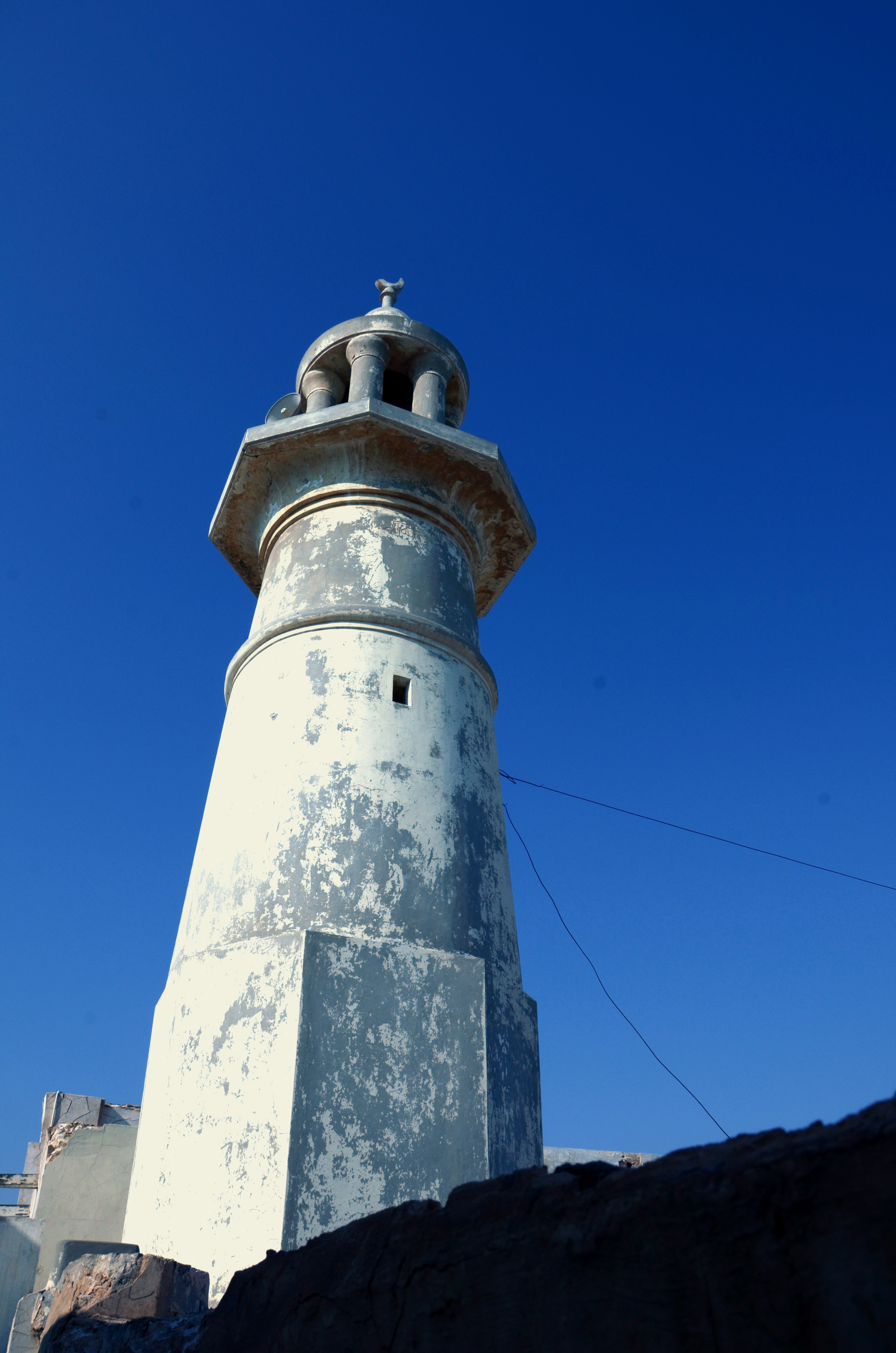
A historic mosque in Al Khor

To protect both the coveted Ain Hleetan Well and the town's fledgling harbour, the villagers built the Al Khor Towers around 1900. Originally a collection of eight towers, only three survived throughout the ages. Multiple different families were tasked with maintaining and renovating each tower. Located next to these towers at the northern boundary of Al Khor was the Barahat Al-Jawhar, a cultural venue of unknown origins dating back to either the late 19th century or early 20th century. Holidays, cultural activities such as ardah performances, and wedding celebrations were held here due to the large amount of open space in this structure. It had arches on all sides, its façade had geometric patterns and it was built of a type of stone not naturally found in the region. Cannons belonging to the Ottoman garrison at Al Khor were found inside, suggesting it may have been built by the Ottomans for a defensive purpose.

During the 20th century, drinking water was obtained primarily from the Umm aş Şuwayyah area to the southwest of the village, as this well was renowned for its water's freshness. Women would fetch this water in pots and place them on the backs of donkeys to be transported back to the village. There were also several springs in the village, among them, Ain Sadd, Ain Salam, Ain Al-Dab, and Ain Masoud. Each spring was named after the individual responsible for excavating it. Furthermore, the village's basic water needs were met by three primary reservoirs: Al-Jalta Dam, a cement dam built inland in Al Egda, the Ain Al-Dab Dam built near the Al Khor Police Station on the coast, and the Roza Dam, built to the north near what is today Al Thakhira Road.

The village had an international presence during this period, with frequent trade missions taking place to the coast of Fars. Their relationship was so extensive that it was even incorrectly speculated by English diplomat Charles Belgrave that the Al Muhannadi originated from Iran. Goods that were brought back from trading missions would then be sold at one of the village's three primary souqs.

Captain Francis Prideaux, who was the British political resident in Bahrain, remarked in 1906 that, although Al Bidda was firmly under Al Thani-rule, the tribes of northern settlements, including Khor Al Shaqiq, did not pay tribute to the Sheikh Jassim bin Mohammed Al Thani, nor did they consider themselves subjects of his.

It was remarked by the British political resident in Bahrain in 1939 that the Al Muhannadi in Al Khor had about 600 fighting men led by Sheikh Ahmed Bin Essa, and were closely tied to the Bani Hajer tribe. In 1950, anthropologist Henry Field visited Qatar, publishing his findings a year later. While there, he interviewed Mansur bin Khalil, a local sheikh, who informed him that the population of the Al Muhannadi in Al Khor was approximately 2,000 people. Some lived in tents while others resided in primitive stone dwellings.

==== Lorimer report ====
J. G. Lorimer's Gazetteer of the Persian Gulf gives an account of Al Khor (referring to it as Khor Shaqiq) in 1908:

"Generally pronounced as Shajij or Shagig. The name of an inlet and of the village which it contains, upon the east side of the Qatar Promontory: the entrance of the inlet, which is shallow and runs about 4 miles inland, is situated between Ras-an-Nof and Ras Matbakh, about 26 miles north of Doha. Khor Shaqiq is frequently called "Khor-al-Mahandah," or simply "Khor," in contradistinction to "Al Khuwair," on the other side of the peninsula.

The village stands on the south side of the inlet, near its foot; not far from it is a hill, surmounted by a watch tower, and under the hill is a well of good water called Halaitan. Al Thakhira is only 4 miles to the northward of Khor Shaqiq and is reached by a track which turned the foot of the inlet and then crosses a level plain. Four miles south of Khor Saqiq is Halat Wabil, an island-reef, still covered at high-tide but said to be rapidly increasing in elevation. The village consists of about 400 mud and stone houses of Mahandah (Al Muhannadi), half of the Al Hasan and half of the Misandah section, to whom belong 80 pearl boats [manned by 1200 men], 90 other sea-going vessels and 30 fishing boats, besides 100 camels."

==== Modernisation ====
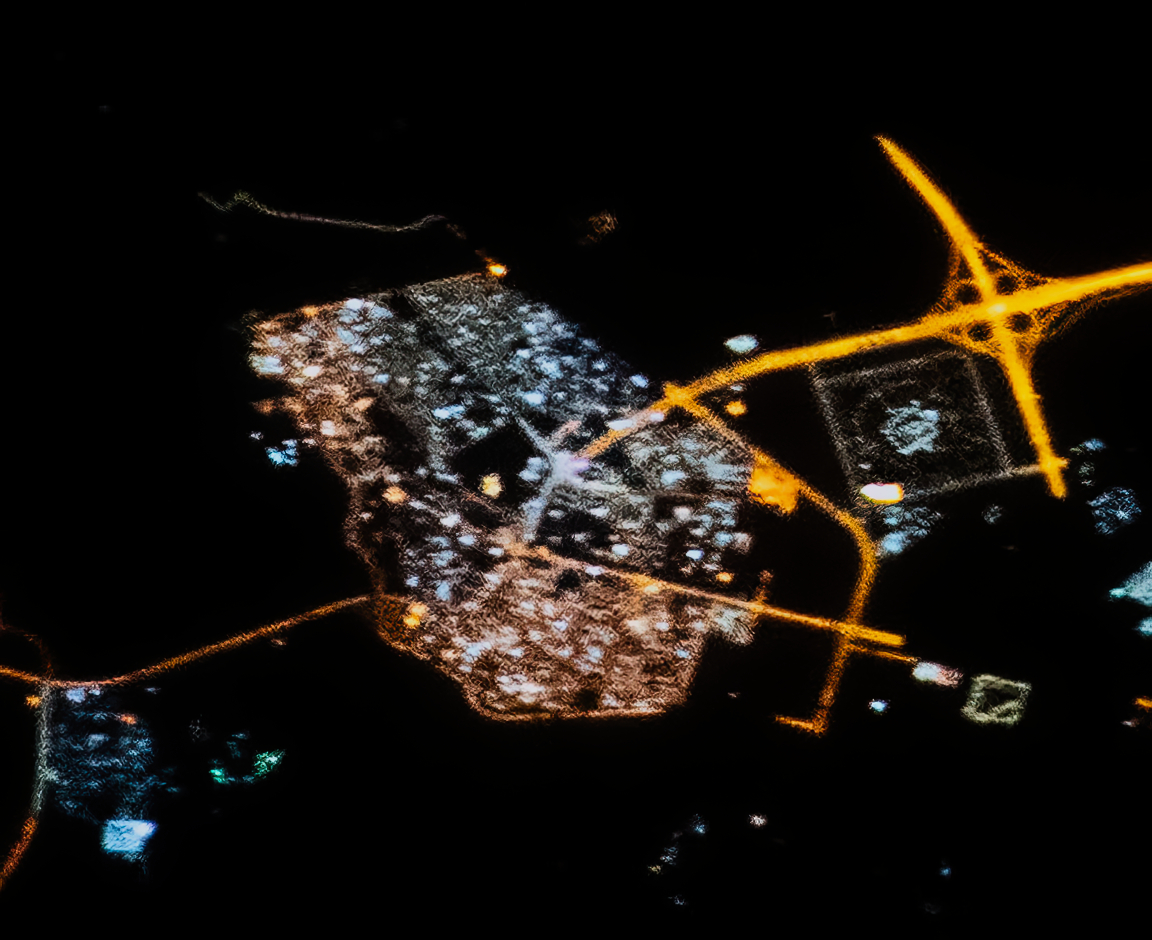
Satellite view of Al Khor at night

Modernisation in the town started in the 1940s and 1950s, after Qatar started reaping the benefits of its newly discovered oil fields. The first paved road connecting Al Khor to the capital Doha was constructed in the 1940s, and in the 1950s, the town constructed its first hospital. A primary school followed shortly after. The town also began to be referred to simply as 'Al Khor' rather than 'Khor Al Shaqiq'. At this time, most of Al Khor's houses, built out of stone, were located along the beachfront, being connected by a series of narrow alleyways. Many were two-story houses with cooling rooms on the top floor for summer months. In 1965, the city was integrated into Qatar's electrical grid.

In the early 1960s, pan-Arabism had established itself in the peninsula, and in 1963, the Qatar National Unity Front was created. The movement, which opposed royal privilege and advocated for increased workers rights, had a stronghold in Al Khor. One of its leaders belonged to the Al-Missned sub-tribe of the Al Muhannadi, and the group was popular with residents. In retaliation, a small number of high-ranking Al Thani members suggested bombing Al Khor, though this idea was dismissed. After the Qatari government cracked down on the group, in 1964 they banished many members of the Al Muhannadi to Kuwait, where they would remain for several months before returning to Qatar after mediation from the Saudi government. It was also stipulated that each tribe member was to pledge allegiance to the emir of Qatar, and those who refused would stay in exile.

In the late 1960s, Al Khor was among the northern Qatari towns designated to benefit from the initial phase of a state housing program. Completed in 1969, the program provided modern residences and basic utilities to local families as part of a national project to improve living standards.

In July 1972, the Al Khor Municipality was officially established with Al Khor as its seat. Following this decree, the government began large-scale development projects in the town, which included replacing all old housing units and establishing government office branches in the town. Residences on the shorefront were demolished, making way for modern housing built at higher elevations. Also in the early 1970s, Al Khor Health Center was inaugurated. By the 1980s, the primary and secondary road system for Al Khor was developed by the Ministry of Public Works. In 1983–84, Al Khor was included as part of a major project by the Ministry of Public Works valued at QAR 535 million to develop sewage infrastructure in major settlements outside of Doha.

=== 21st century ===
Due to the continuous expansion at Ras Laffan Industrial City, the number of facilities and services available in the town is rapidly increasing. In October 2015, Ashghal (Public Works Authority) revealed that it would be investing billions of Qatari riyals into developing infrastructure in Al Khor. Its plan includes the creation of additional hospitals and schools and the refurbishment of the road system.

== Geography ==
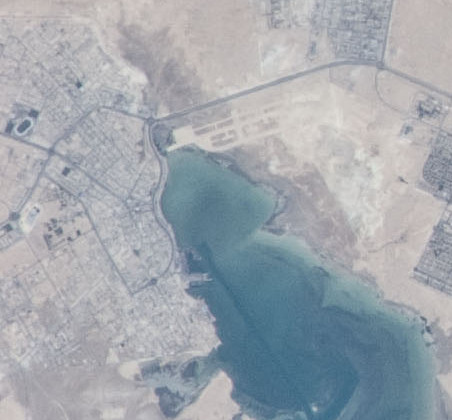
Satellite imagery of Al Khor 2010

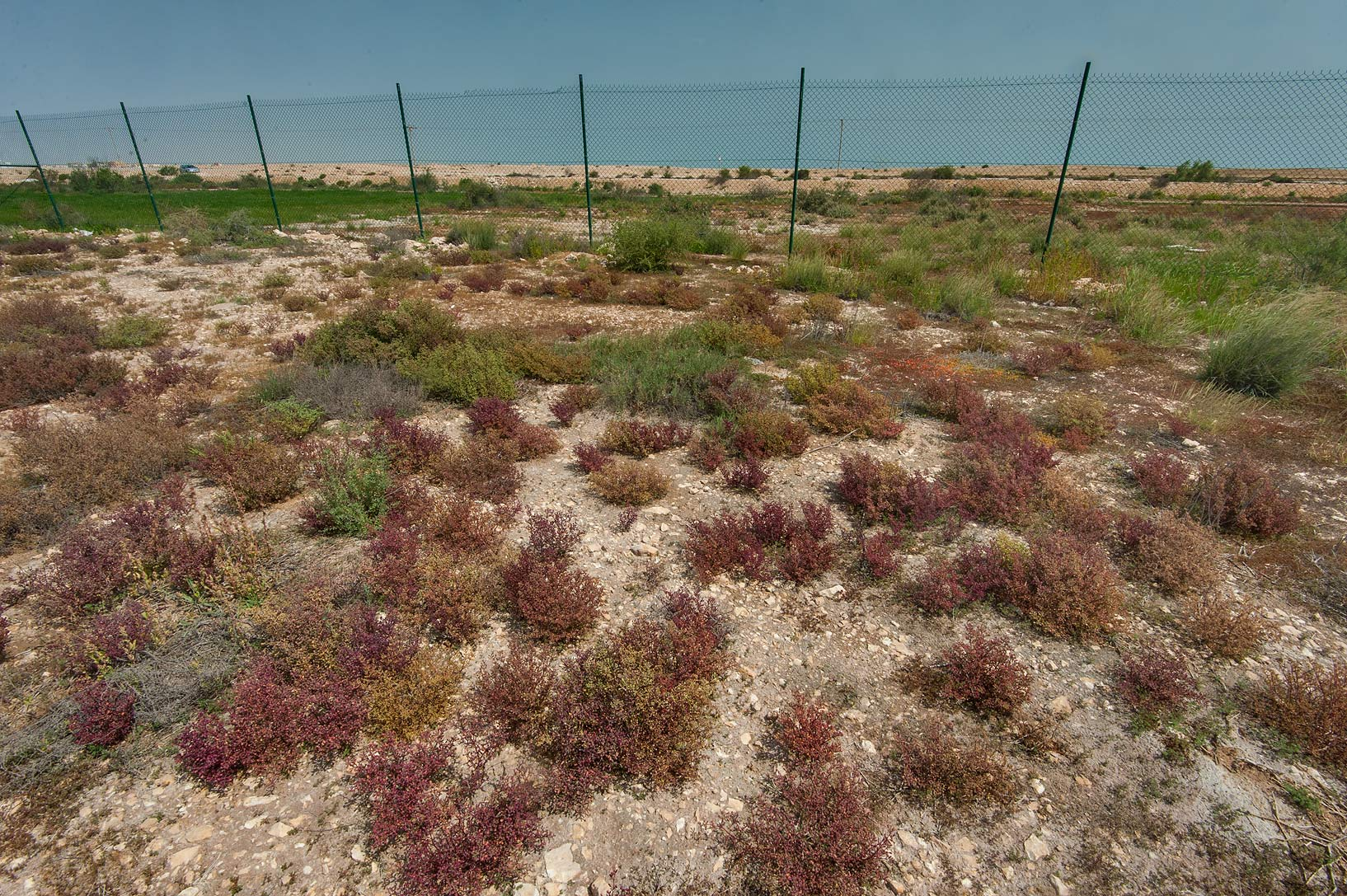
Vegetated landscape to the north of Al Khor, east of the Al Jebail water treatment plant

Qatar's capital, Doha, is located 57 km (35 mi) to the south.

Al Khor overlooks a sheltered bay upon which Al Khor Island (also known as Purple Island and Jazirat Bin Ghanim) lies. The width of the bay ranges from 2.2 to 6.5 km (1.4 to 4.0 mi). It is linked to the open sea by a channel with a width of roughly 750 metres (2,460 ft) on its southern end. The area is home to extensive stands of mangroves, which cover an area of about 168 hectares off the coast.

=== Flora and fauna ===
Al Khor is one of the main hawksbill sea turtle nesting sites in Qatar.

Common vegetation found in Al Khor include alaqool (Alhagi maurorum) in the northwest, qurdi (Ochradenus baccatus), mangroves (Avicennia marina), glasswort (Salicornia europaea), hadh (Cornulaca aucheri), rimth (Haloxylon salicornicum), Arab bean (Gypsophila vaccaria), cottina (Bassia eriophora), broadleaf seagrass (Halophila stipulacea) near the coast, Mesembryanthemum nodiflorum, Anabasis setifera and cleome barbaran (Cleome brachycarpa).

Plants such as qalam (Arthrocaulon macrostachyum) and thailoth (Halocnemum strobilaceum) are found primarily in salt marshes. Flowers of the Sonchus genus (commonly known as common sow thistles) have also been observed in rare instances.

Together with Al Thakhira, roughly 1,392 hectares of mangroves are found along the shoreline and the inlet at the town's eastern edge, making the coastline between Al Thakhira and Al Khor the most densely populated mangrove habitat in Qatar.

=== Hydrology ===
In a 2010 survey of Al Khor's coastal waters conducted by the Qatar Statistics Authority, it was found that its average depth was 5 metres (16 ft) and its average pH was 8.11. Furthermore, the waters had a salinity of 48.58 psu, an average temperature of 24.72 °C and 6.44 mg/L of dissolved oxygen.

=== Climate ===
Climate data for Al Khor City
Month	Jan	Feb	Mar	Apr	May	Jun	Jul	Aug	Sep	Oct	Nov	Dec	Year
Mean daily maximum °C (°F)	20.5 (68.9)	22.5 (72.5)	27 (81)	32.5 (90.5)	39 (102)	41.5 (106.7)	42 (108)	40.5 (104.9)	39 (102)	35 (95)	29 (84)	23 (73)	32.6 (90.7)
Mean daily minimum °C (°F)	12 (54)	13.5 (56.3)	16 (61)	21 (70)	25 (77)	26.5 (79.7)	28.5 (83.3)	27.5 (81.5)	26 (79)	23.5 (74.3)	20 (68)	14 (57)	21.1 (70.1)
Average precipitation mm (inches)	11 (0.4)	1.5 (0.06)	2 (0.1)	6.5 (0.26)	1 (0.0)	0 (0)	0 (0)	0 (0)	0 (0)	0.25 (0.01)	13.5 (0.53)	22 (0.9)	57.75 (2.26)
Average relative humidity (%)	61	60	56	53	49	50	51	57	60	63	69	74	59
Source: Qatar Statistics Authority

== Economy ==
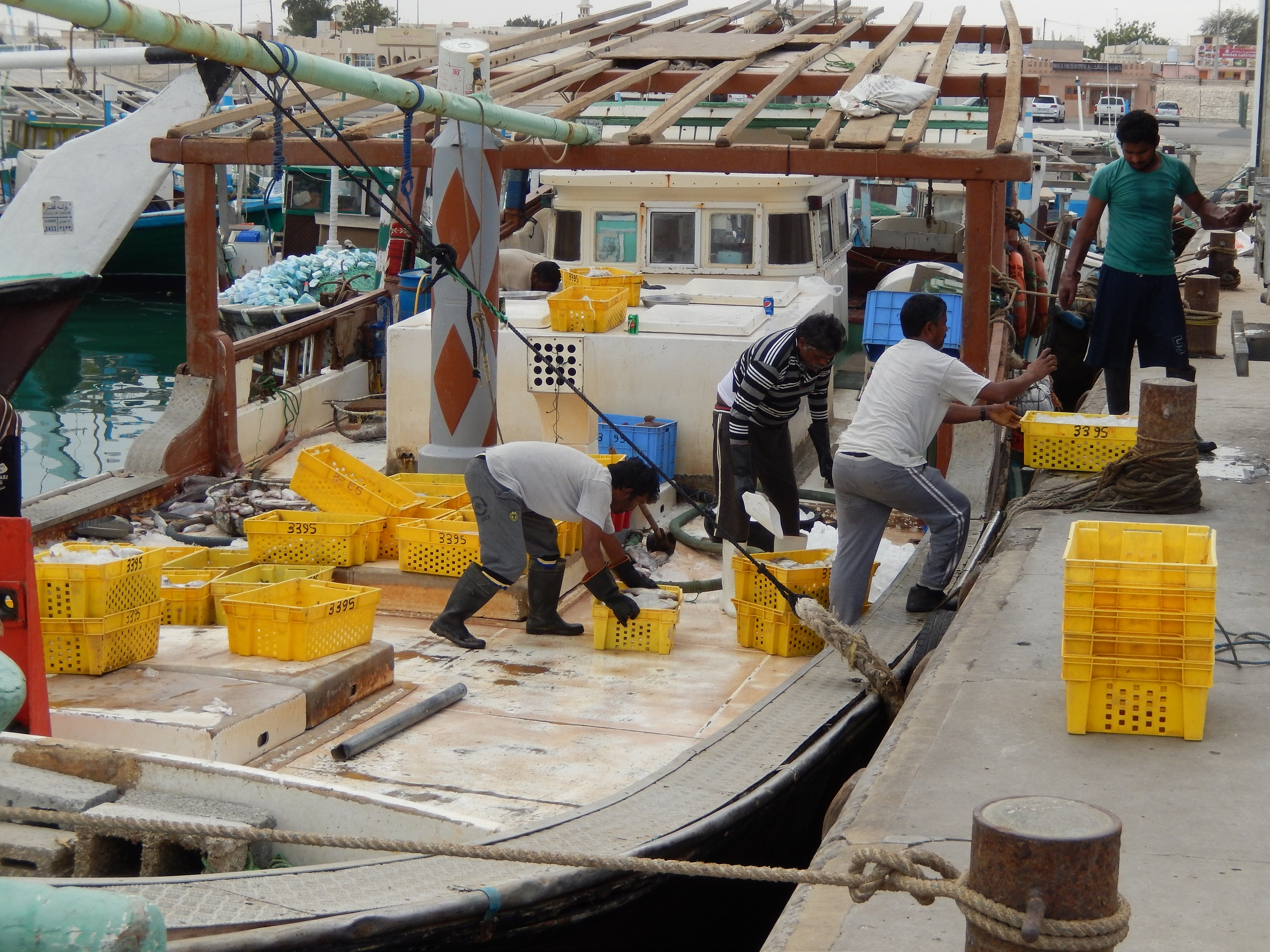
Workers unloading freshly caught fish at the harbour

An industrial centre exists to the northwest of Al Khor known as the Al Khor Industrial Area.

=== Fishing ===
In terms of artisanal fishing vessels, Al Khor had the highest number out of any city surveyed in 2015 at 234 vessels. The city also had the most sailors (1,408) and was also the only major city to record an increase in the number of sailors from 2010 to 2015. In 2019, the largest-ever expansion project of Qatari fishing ports was launched by the Ministry of Municipality and Environment, which included an additional 208 parking lots for boats in the Al Khor Harbor.

=== Urban development projects ===
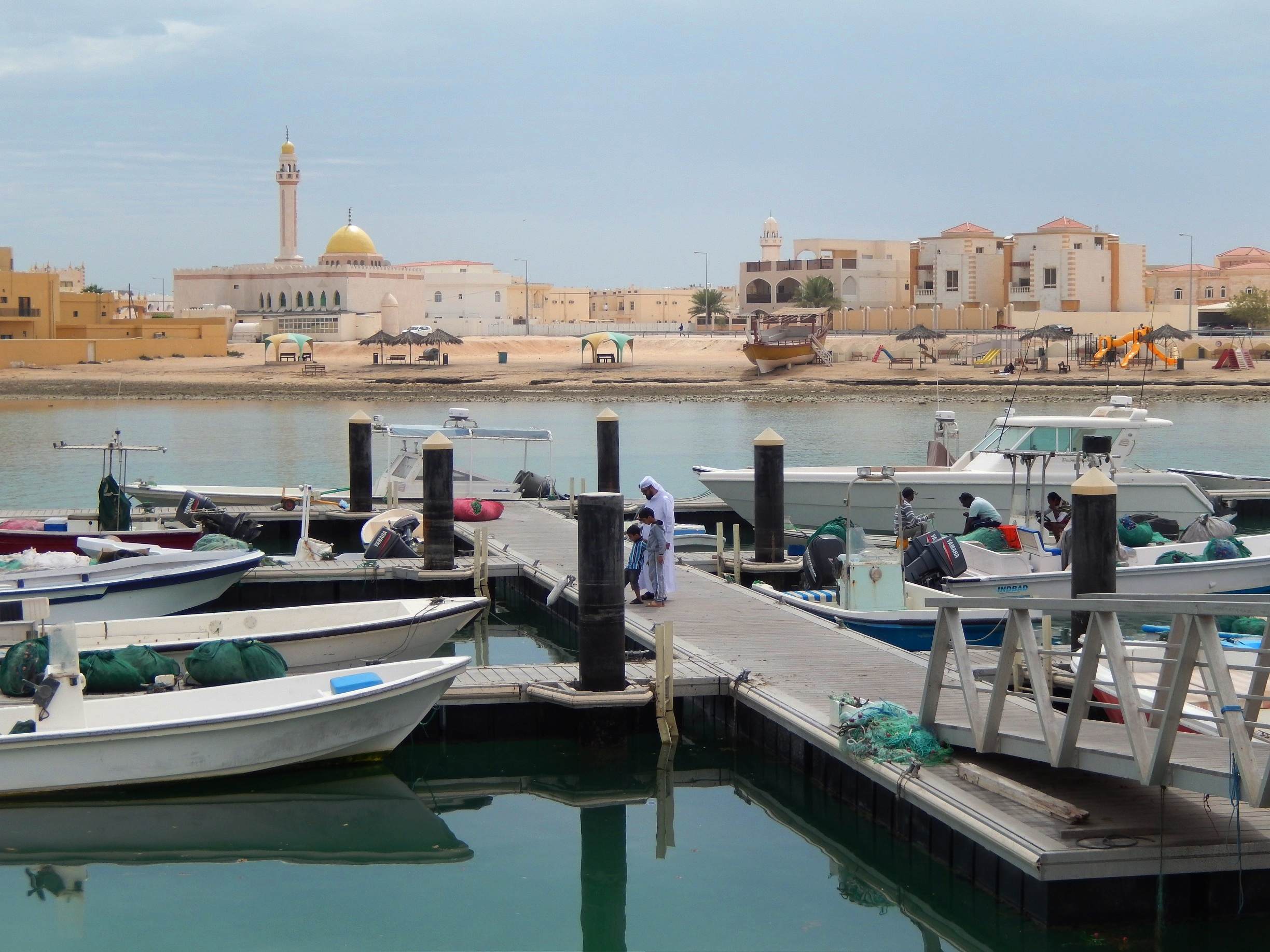
Al Khor Harbor

The Urban Planning & Development Authority conducted extensive surveying of Al Khor throughout 2007 and 2008 before officially publishing the 'Al-Khor City Master Plan 2032' in 2008. Key features of the master plan include increased availability of public transport, extensive development along the city's 8 km (5.0 mi) of seafront and development of Al Khor Beach, a popular domestic attraction.

Barwa Group carries out real estate projects in Al Khor through its subsidiary, Barwa Al Khor. In November 2008, the group unveiled its major 'Urjuan' project, which had a projected cost of $10 billion. Urjuan was described as a planned city capable of hosting 63,000 inhabitants spread over 5.5 million square km. The project had a planned completion date of 2013 and its plots were to be sold through several phases. However, in December 2009, the project was put on hold indefinitely.

=== Real estate projects ===
Families of Qatargas were provided with accommodation in Al Khor Community, one of the largest residential complexes in the country. Al Khor International School is located within the community. An investment of over QR 2 billion has been spent on the complex over the years by Alaqaria, a subsidiary of Barwa Group.

== Healthcare ==
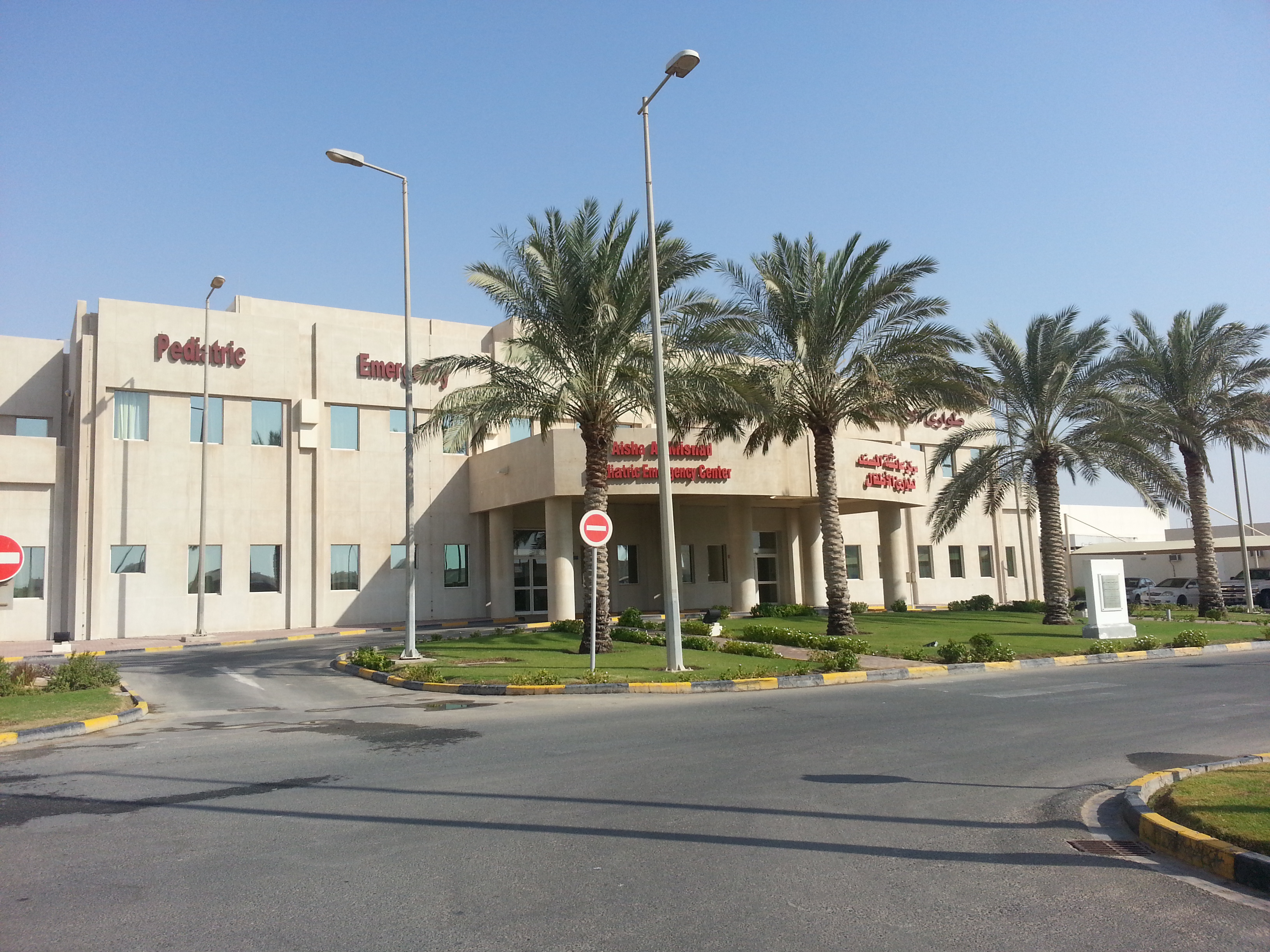
Pediatric Emergency Center of Al Khor Hospital

The city is served by Al Khor General Hospital, which is under the auspices of Hamad Medical Corporation. It has a bed capacity of 115 and was opened in May 2005 as the first multi-specialty healthcare facility situated outside of Doha. Health services provided by the hospital include general medical care, general surgery, obstetrics, pediatrics and neonatal care. There are also a few health centres, one of the largest being Al Khor Community Medical Centre.

Ashghal (Public Works Authority) announced their intent to open a hospital with a bed capacity of 500 at a cost of QR 3.6 billion by 2017. Also included in the plan was a modern health centre.

== Education ==
The first formal school in Qatar outside of Doha opened in the city in 1952. The city's first public library opened in 1977.

The city's main school is Al Khor International School, accommodating 4,000 students of families employed by QatarEnergy LNG. In 2015, a government-sanctioned plan saw the allocation of QR 200 million towards building new schools with a planned completion date of late 2016.

== Visitor attractions ==
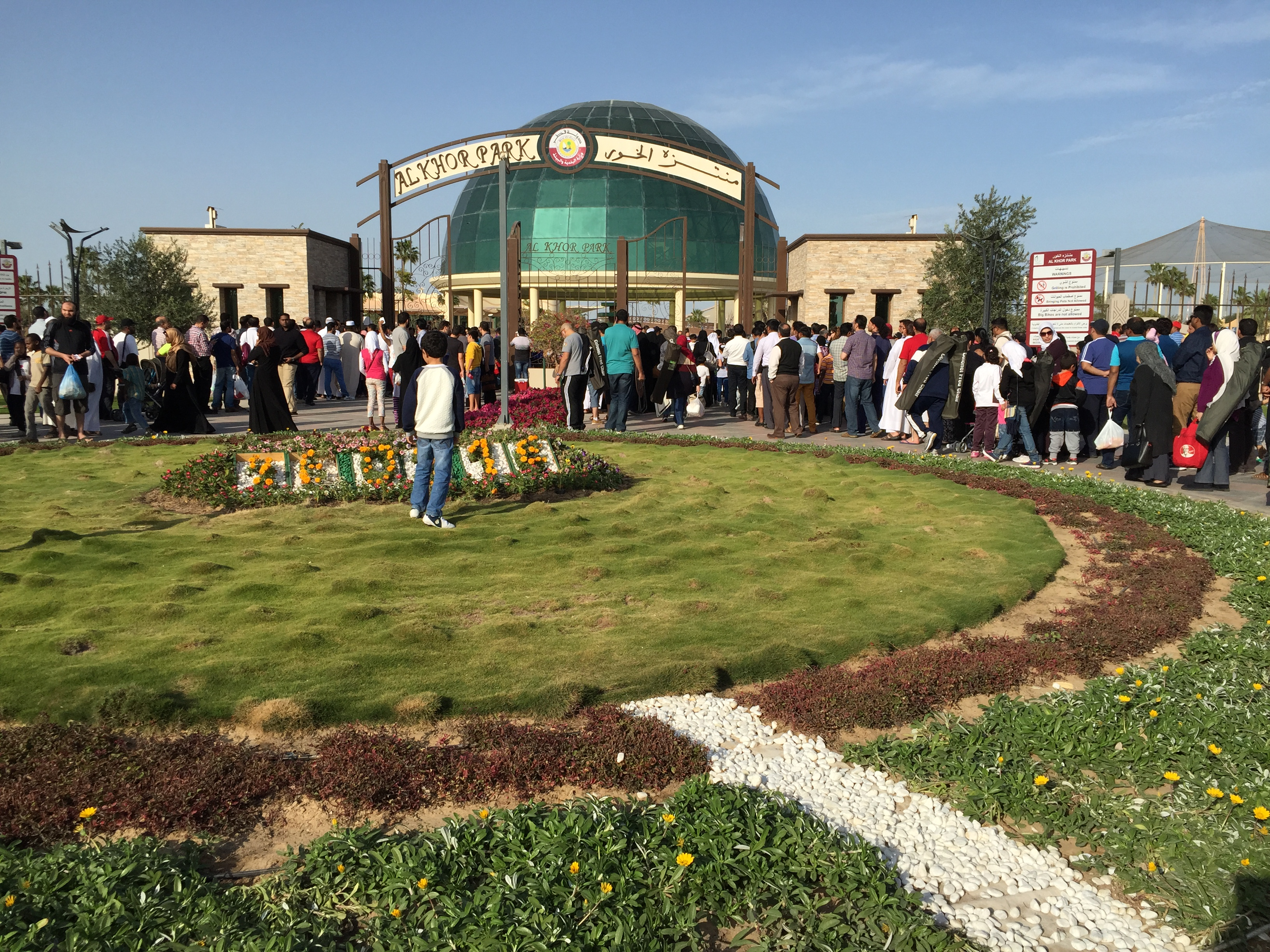
Entrance to Al Khor Park

=== Parks and zoos ===
The city has one of the largest parks – Al Khor Family Park & Zoo – in Qatar with an area of 240,000 m^{2} (2,600,000 sq ft). Starting in June 2010, the government has invested QR 250 million in refurbishing the park. This has resulted in the development of new facilities in the park such as a mini-golf course, a railway station and a museum. The renovated park was officially reopened on 18 February 2016. The park also features a zoo, which hosts pandas, a first-ever in the Middle East.

The Baladna complex, which contains Baladna Farm and Baladna Park, is a popular local destination catering to families. Occupying an area of 2.4 million square metres, the complex offers various outdoor activities and games. A zoo hosting various animal species is also found in the complex. Baladna also has a visitors centre that provides educational tours of dairy production.

=== Commercial attractions ===
Attractions in Al Khor include Al-Sultan Beach Hotel & Resort, a palace that was converted into a hotel, and its large concentrations of modern and historical mosques. The main industry of the city is fishing. There are several beaches surrounding Al Khor, and the beaches south of it are home to many beach houses owned by both residents of the city and residents of Doha.

Al Khor Mall is the primary mall in the city, having opened in 2012. The city's first cinema was slated to open in Al Khor Mall at the end of 2015.

=== Al Khor Corniche ===
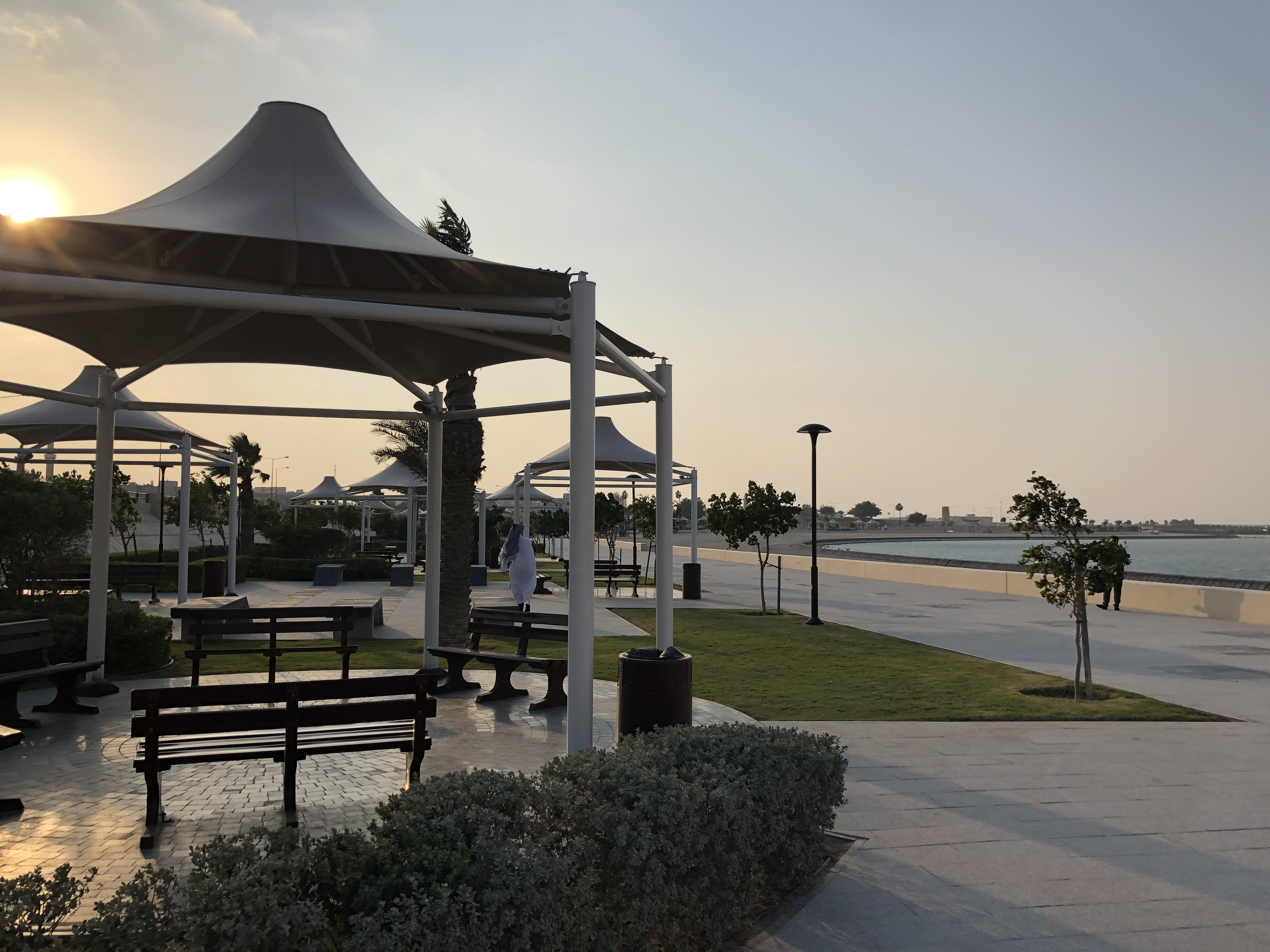
Al Khor Corniche

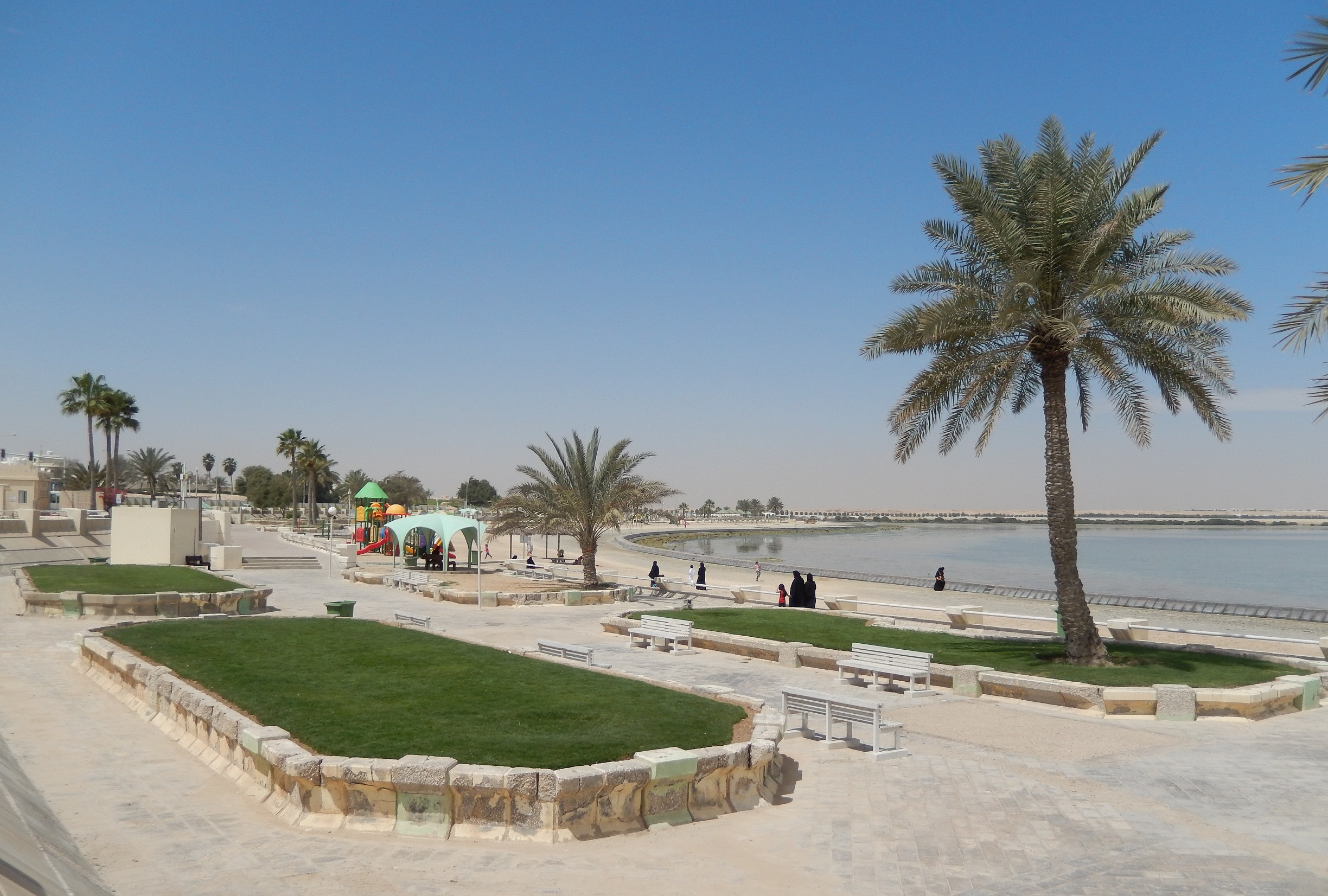
Al Khor Corniche, overlooking the Persian Gulf

Al Khor Corniche is one of the most popular and accessible attractions in the city. A seafront promenade that runs for approximately 1 km (0.62 mi) and takes up over 28,000 m^{2} (300,000 sq ft). The corniche is dotted with numerous cafes, green areas, and recreational areas. Beginning in 2017 and finishing in 2018, Ashghal (the Public Work Authority) refurbished the entire corniche. They added two children's play areas, bringing the total to five. They also improved accessibility for handicapped people, added over 6,000 m^{2} (65,000 sq ft) of green areas and over 250 seats, and replaced every tile of the walkway.

=== Natural attractions ===
Al Khor Island (commonly known as Purple Island) is located near the city. Considered to be a domestic ecotourism destination, the island is connected to Al Khor by a tapered dirt path that runs through several streams.

A fenced-off beach referred to as either Al Farkiya Beach or Al Khor Family Beach provides a recreational space for families. Running for a stretch of about 1,350 metres (4,430 ft), is situated on the Farkeeh Coast and accommodates bathrooms, a playground and a concession stand.

=== Historic architecture ===
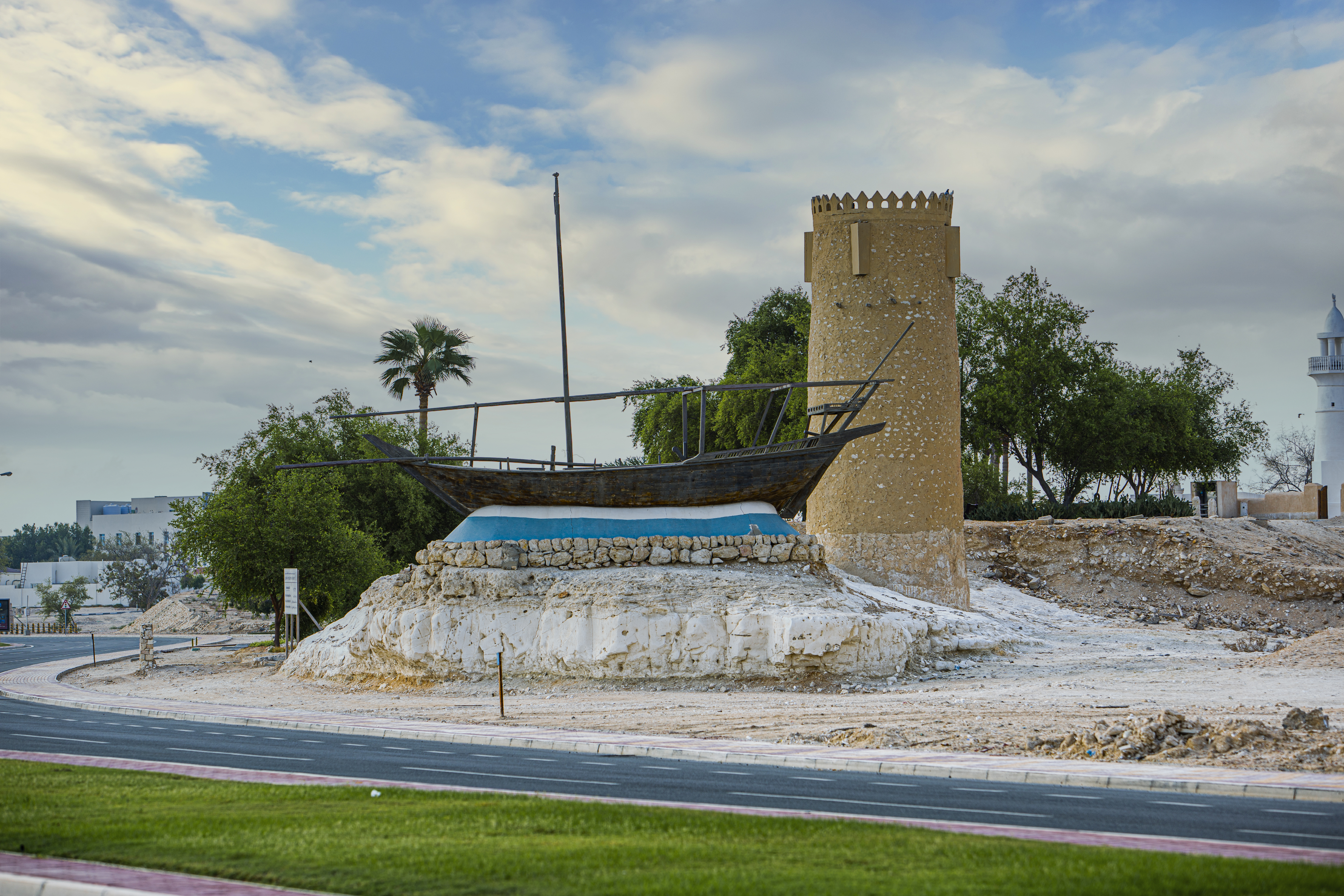
One of the historic Al Khor Towers

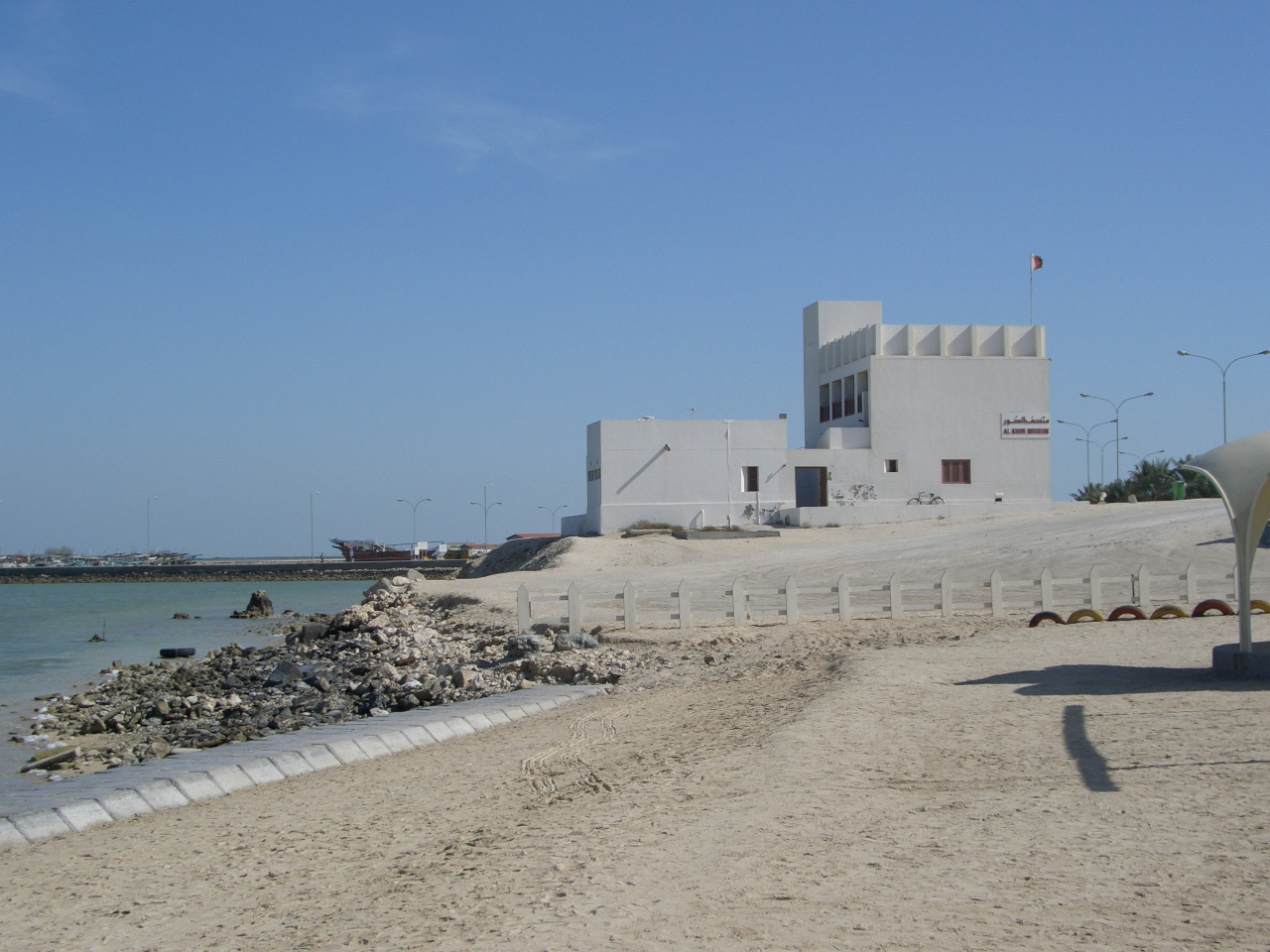
Al Khor Museum

Three historic watchtowers, known as the Al Khor Towers, remain near Al Khor's shoreline, having been built in the late 19th century to early 20th century. Their primary purposes were to provide a vantage point and to scout for potential attacks. The three towers, each cylindrical, have walls that are 60 cm (24 in) thick and diameters of approximately 4 m (13 ft) each.

Among Al Khor's historic sites is the Ain Hleetan Well, which oral tradition suggests led to the founding of the city. First built in the late 1800s of a mixture consisting of plaster, clay, and gravel, the water from the well was believed by locals to be of medicinal value. It is said that it was discovered by a group of hunters, and that its construction eventually led to the development of the surrounding area which evolved into the modern-day city of Al Khor. In recognition of its historic importance, a marketplace consisting of over 70 stores known as Ain Hleetan Market was erected near the well, bolstering its tourism potential. Qatar Museums is responsible for the upkeep and maintenance of the well.

Comprising two houses adjacent to a marketplace, the Al Ansari Property is situated in the central part of Al Khor. It was constructed around 1930 for members of the Al Ansari family, who also owned the neighbouring Al Khor Souq, which dates back to 1910. The houses underwent several expansions after their construction to lodge more family members.

Located in a former two-level police station along the coast is the Al Khor Archaeological Museum. It houses artifacts collected from expeditions carried out in the municipality. On the ground floor of the museum, handiwork relating to Qatar's cultural heritage are displayed, and there are exhibits on the maritime traditions historically engaged in by Qataris, such as fishing and shipbuilding. Ancient artifacts obtained from excavations, including those done on the dye industry in Al Khor Island, are hosted on the first floor, as well as geographic maps of Al Khor. On the second level, visitors are provided with a view of the bay and docks near the museum.

== Sports ==
There are two major sports stadiums in the city: Al-Khor SC Stadium, whose tenants are Al Khor SC and Al Bayt Stadium, which was completed for the 2022 FIFA World Cup. Al Bayt Stadium, which translates to 'the house', is designed to replicate a traditional tent used by Qatari nomads. The seating capacity is 68,895 spectators, and it hosted the semi-final between France and Morocco on 14 December 2022. The Italian industrial group Salini Impregilo was contracted to oversee the stadium's construction operations for a fee of QR 3.1 billion.

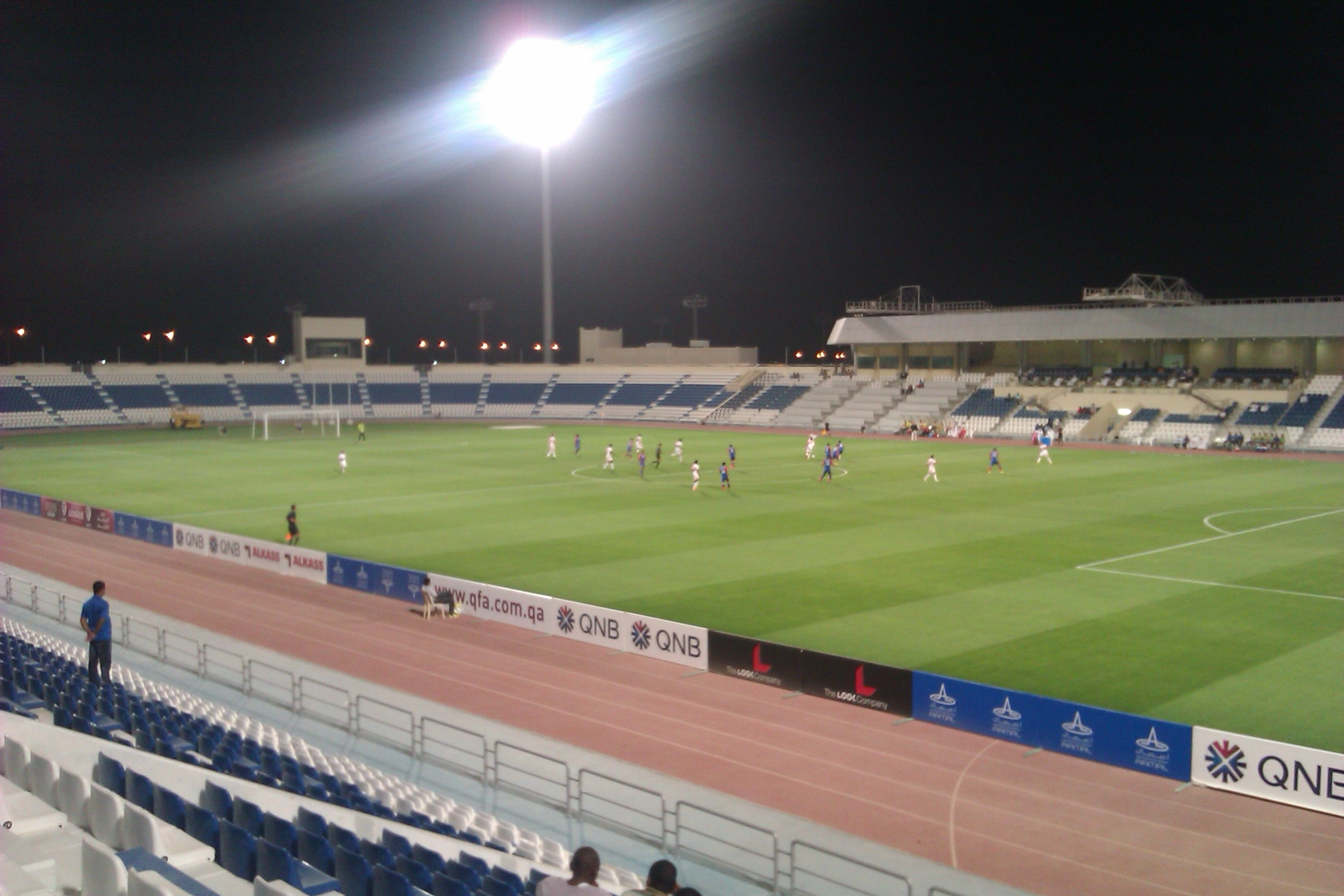
Al Khor SC Stadium, current home grounds of Al Khor SC

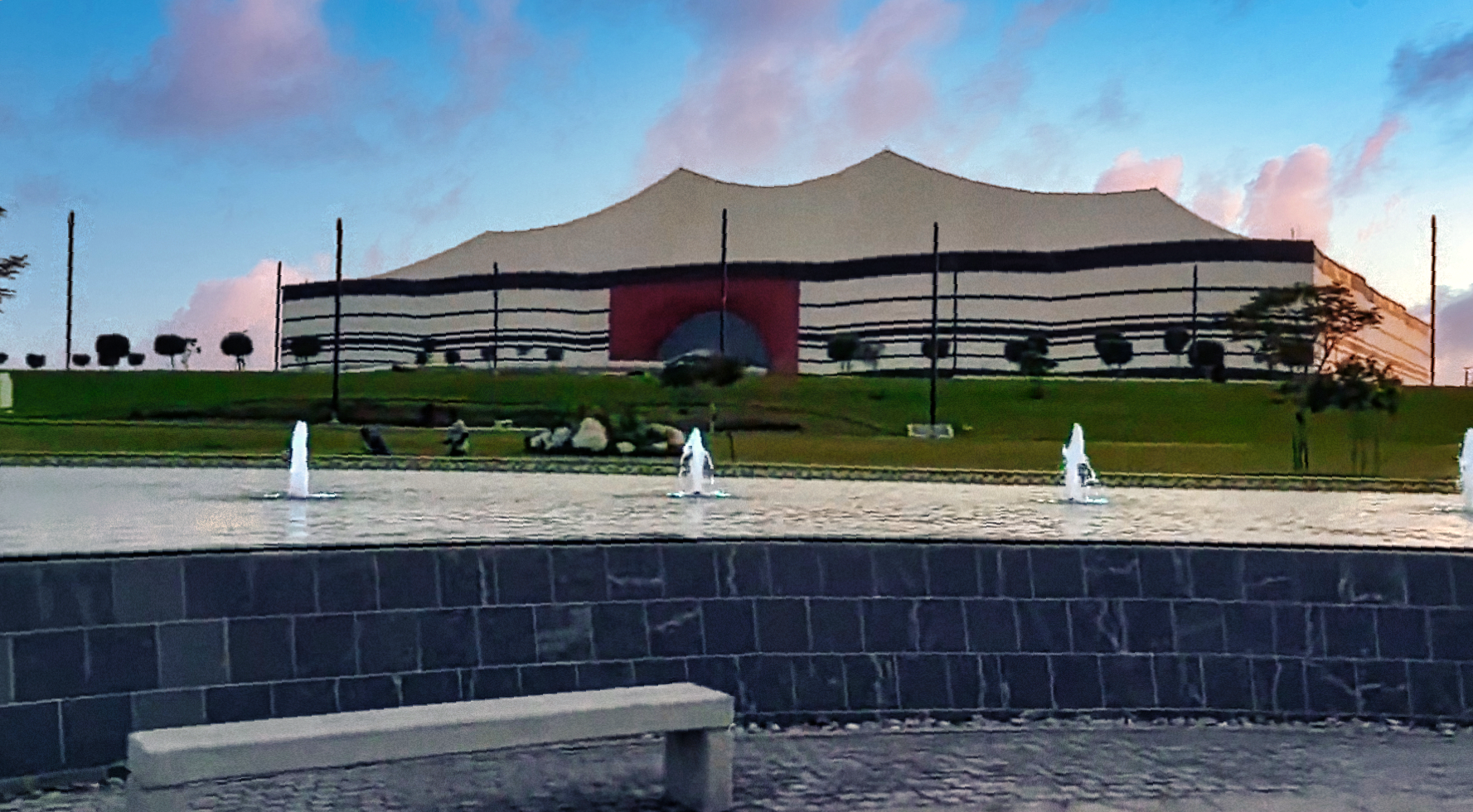
Al Bayt Stadium, a venue of the 2022 FIFA World Cup.

== Culture ==
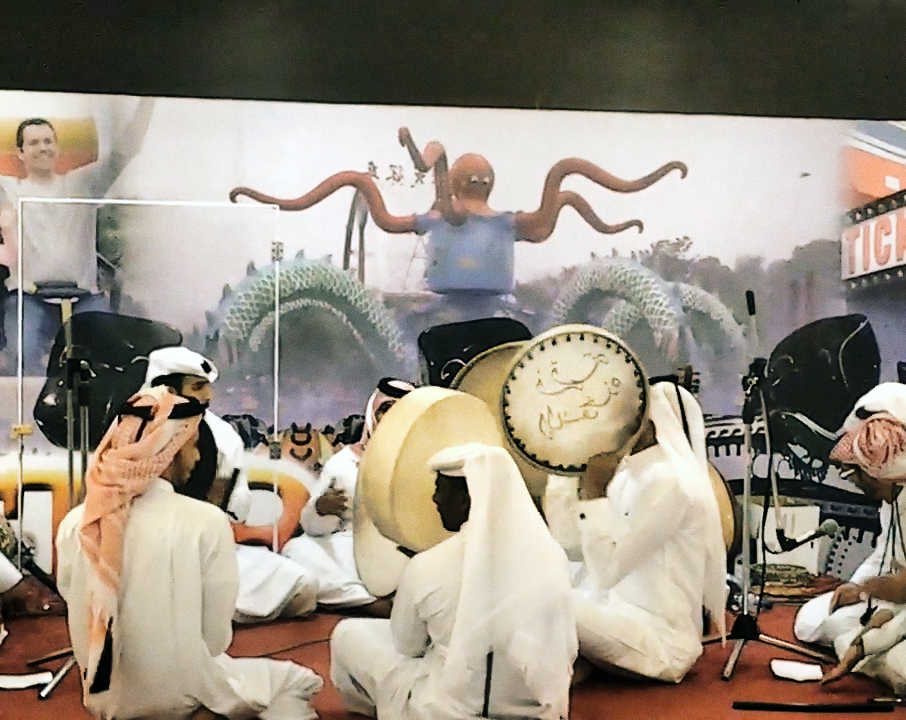
Traditional Qatari music performed at Al Khor Mall

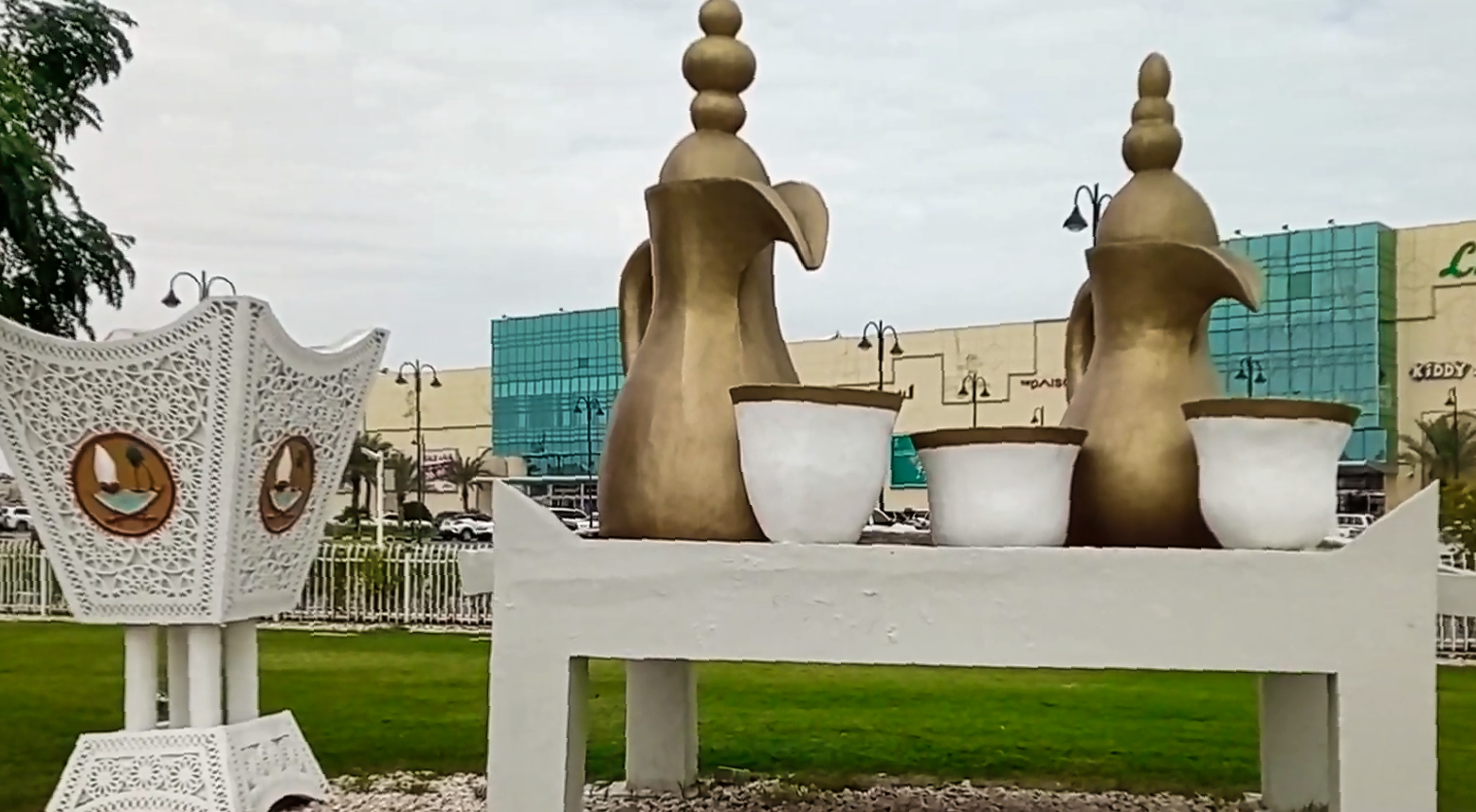
Public art at Al Khor Mall symbolising Qatar's heritage

=== Cultural organisations ===
By the 1960s, three social and cultural clubs had formed in Al Khor; Al Ittihad, Al Asifah, and Al Kifah. The former of those clubs was founded in 1966 by Mohammed Ali Al Mohannadi under the name Al Najma before changing its name to Al Ittihad. The club hosted plays in its theatre, which was in a residential house, and charged admission fees to attendees. Various social issues were often the subject of the club's plays. Aside from hosting plays and cultural performances, these clubs also organised amateur football matches.

In 1982, the Ministry of Information established Al Khor Cultural Center in an attempt to conserve and document the local culture. This centre was later put under the auspices of the Ministry of Culture. A separate women's section was opened in 2006 with its own library and offers workshops and education trips to heritage sites. The Al Khor Girls Center was established by decree of the Minister of Culture (Decision No. 39 of 2011) and was officially inaugurated on 6 June 2012. The centre aims to provide girls a platform to learn about and practice local customs and values.

=== Music ===
Ardah performances by the Al Muhannadi take place in public venues during holidays, Al Khor being the only town in Qatar other than Abu Dhalouf where such performances by a tribe take place.

A folk music band known as Al Khor Band performs at local events, such as Qatar National Day and the Eid Al-Fitr Festival held in Doha.

Ibrahim Ali is a notable musician from Al Khor, being a founding member of Qatar's first musical troupe, Al Adwaa, in 1968. He specialised in playing the oud and is considered a pioneer in Qatari music. He was a part of a local band at one point, Dar Al Khor.

=== Folklore ===
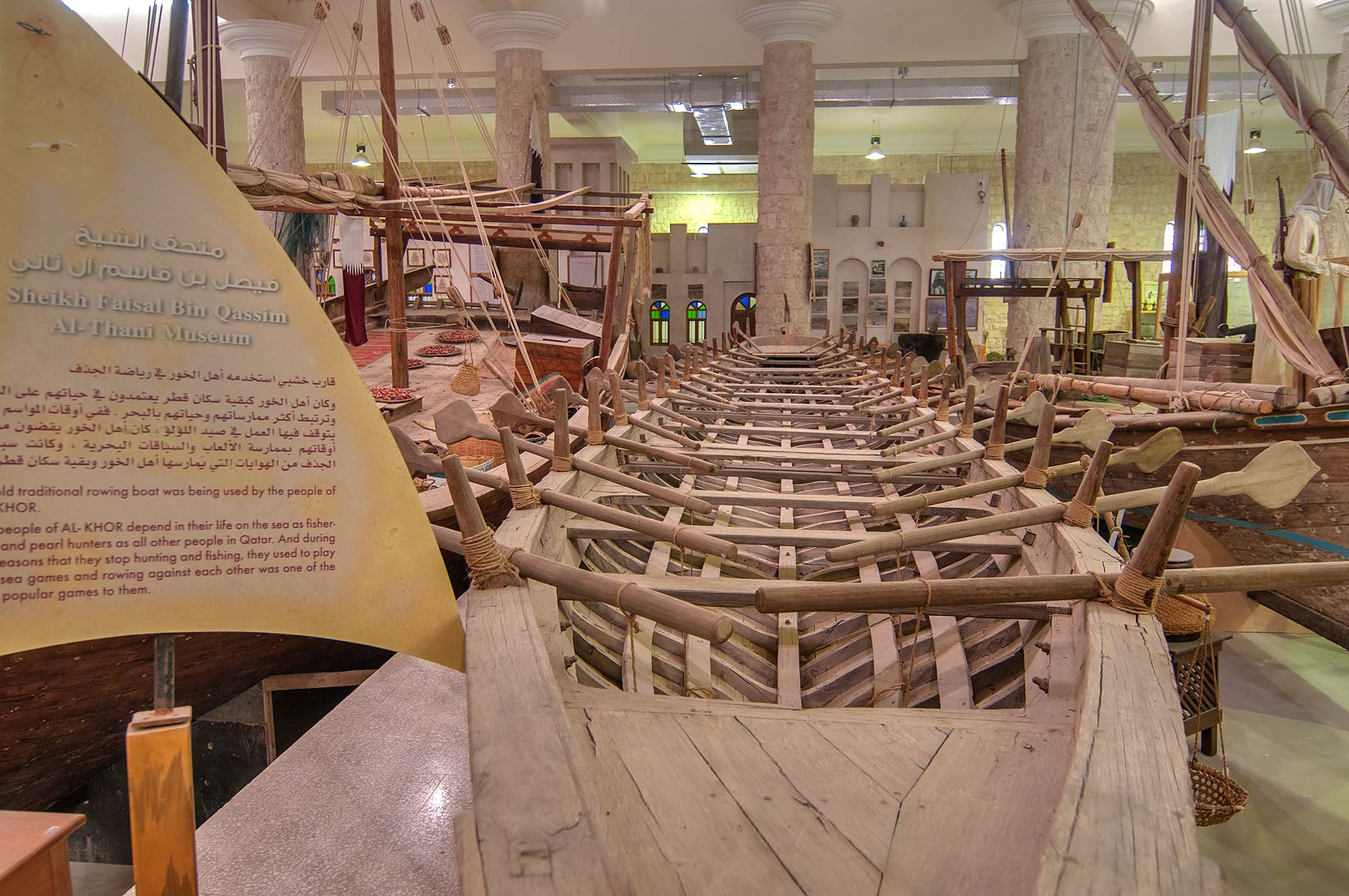
Traditional rowing boat used by the people of Al Khor on display at the Sheikh Faisal bin Qassim Al Thani Museum

In Qatari folklore, the legend of May and Ghilân, once well known in Al Khor, is a local legend (hikāya) and a foundational myth of Qatari pearling. According to tradition, the tale originated among the Al Muhannadi tribe, natives of Qatar's north-east coast whose members alternated between maritime and pastoral livelihoods. It combines two principal themes: the competition between a man and a woman, and the invention of the boat sail.

Set in the port of Khor Al Mahandah (present-day Al Khor), the story recounts that Ghilân, a wealthy and influential owner of pearling vessels, once dominated the local fleet. His supremacy was challenged when May, a woman with stronger and more experienced crews, began to rival him in reaching the pearl beds. On several occasions, her oar-powered boats outpaced his, prompting him to call out, "Tow us, O May!", to which she replied mockingly, "The towing is in the head of the oar".

Determined to regain his advantage, Ghilân is said to have drawn inspiration from the wings of a grasshopper, devising the idea of mounting sails on his boats. With the wind harnessed, his vessels soon outstripped May's. When she called out, "Tow us, O Ghilân!", he answered, "The towing is in the head of the mast". In the logic of the tale, this innovation both secured Ghilân's victory and reaffirmed a male predominance in an occupation historically closed off to women.

The narrative structure consists of five short episodes, punctuated by the repeated phrases about the oar and the mast. While the invention of the sail is the central motif, later retellings often remembered May and Ghilân simply as the initiators of pearl fishing itself. The story's circulation appears to have been largely confined to Al Khor, and by the late twentieth century it was already little known outside the town. Its decline has been attributed to the death of the older generation of pearl fishers and the absence of efforts to revive the tradition. A written version of the legend is currently on display in the Al Khor Museum.

== Transport ==
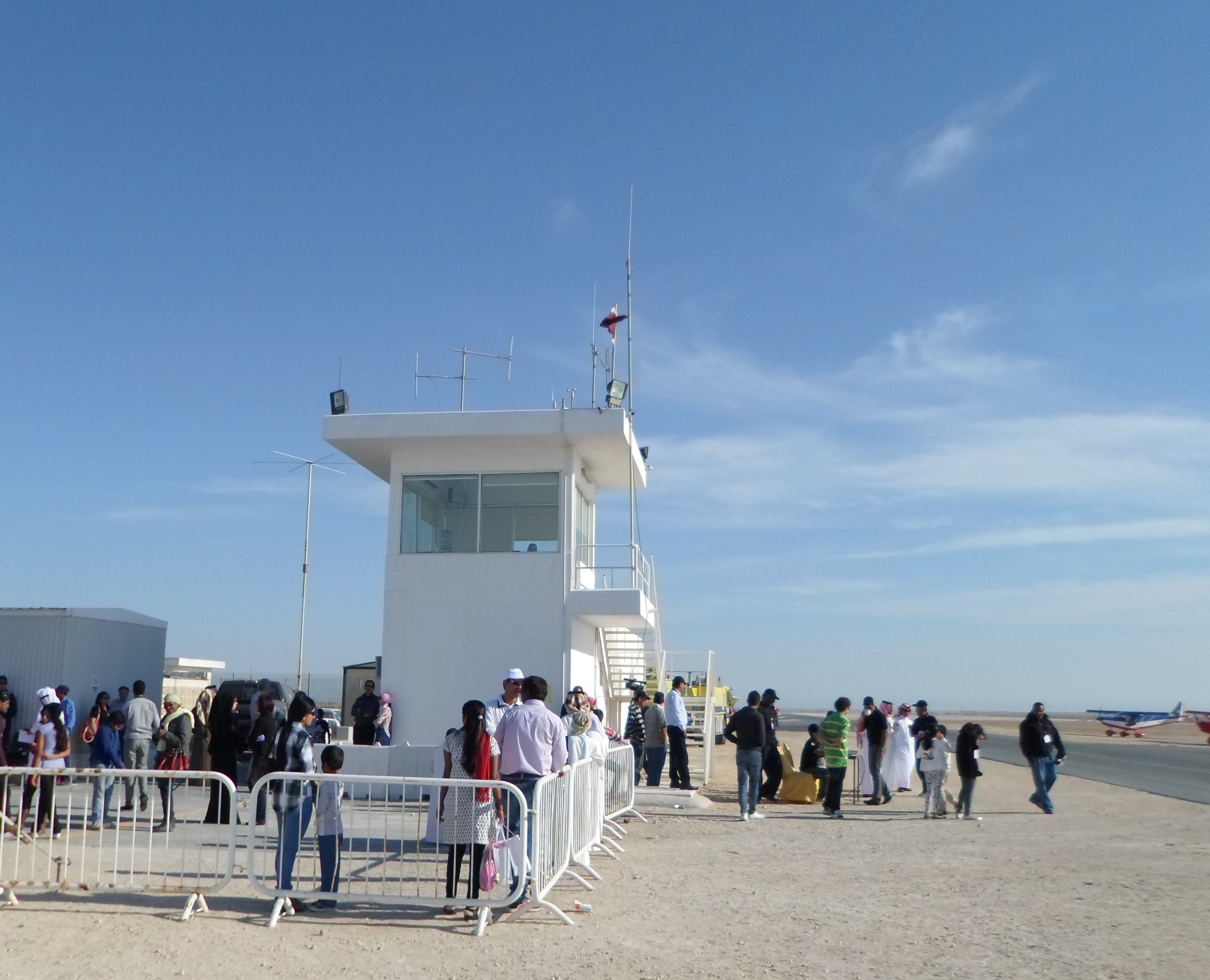
Air traffic control tower at Al Khor Airport

=== Air ===
Aviation traffic is controlled by Al Khor Airport. The airport is mostly used by general aviation aircraft and has served as the venue of the annual Al Khor Fly-In since 2008. The fly-in lasts for two days and allows visitors to travel in and spectate aircraft. Aircraft from other GCC countries are showcased at the event.

=== Road ===
Commutes between the capital Doha and the municipality of Al Khor are facilitated by Al Shamal Road and Al Khor Coastal Road, with the latter road running through Al Daayen and the former running through Umm Salal.

Al Khor and Ras Laffan are connected through Al Huwailah Link Road. In November 2014, the 16 km (9.9 mi) road was converted from a one lane road into a four lane road. Qatar's longest highway, Al Majd Road (formerly known as the Orbital Highway), links Al Khor with the south-eastern coastal city of Mesaieed.

==== Al Khor Road ====
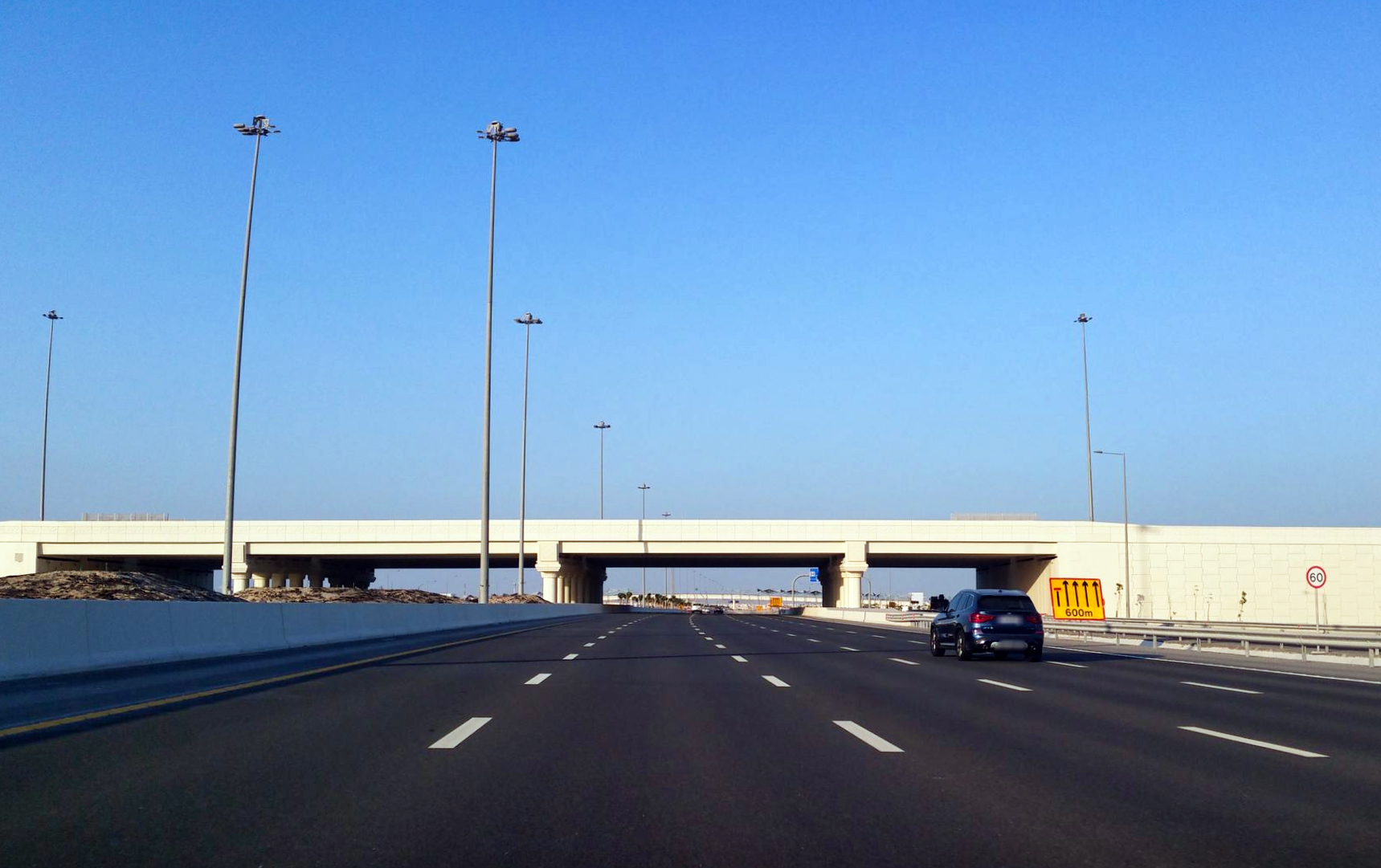
Al Khor Coastal Road

Construction of Al Khor Road, also known as Al Khor Expressway, began in 2016 after Turkish company Tekfen was contracted to construct the road for $2.1 billion. The road runs for 33 km (21 mi) and has 29 tunnels and 5 bridges. It is the main route connecting metropolitan Doha and Lusail with Al Khor, terminating at the Al Bayt Stadium. Over 20 residential areas are served by the road, including Simaisma, Umm Qarn and The Pearl, and the industrial hubs of Mesaieed and Dukhan are indirectly served by the road via its intersection with Al Majd Road. Vital tourist destinations served by the road include Al Farkiya Beach, Katara Cultural Village and Simaisma Beach.

In 2020, an Olympic cycling track was opened to the public. It stretches for almost 33 km (21 mi) to the immediate west of the highway. A 38 km (24 mi) long pedestrian path with 18 underpasses, opened in 2021 which was connected to the cycling path. In September 2020, the development was entered into the Guinness Book of World Records for two separate accolades: having the longest unbroken expanse of paved asphalt at 25.275 km (15.705 mi), and having the most expansive cycling track connected to the highway, at 32.8 km (20.4 mi).

=== Rail ===
As of 2019, the elevated Al Khor Metro Station is under construction, having been launched during Phase 1A. Once completed, it will be part of Doha Metro's Red Line North.

== Central Municipal Council ==
When free elections of the Central Municipal Council first took place in Qatar in 1999, Al Khor was designated the seat of constituency no. 26. It would remain the seat of constituency no. 26 for the next three consecutive elections until the fifth municipal elections in 2015, when it was made the seat of constituency no. 25. Also included in its constituency is Simaisma, Al Daayen Village, north Lusail, and Ras Matbakh. In the inaugural municipal elections in 1999, Rashid Jassim Al-Mohannadi won the elections, receiving 63.3%, or 283 votes. The runner-up candidate was Saleh Majed Al-Mohannadi, whose share of the votes was 12.3%, or 54 votes. Voter turnout was 83.4% Al-Mohannadi retained his seat in the 2002 elections. For the 2007 elections, Saqer Saeed Al-Mohannadi was elected. He once again won the next elections in 2011 to retain his seat. The 2015 elections saw Nasser Ibrahim Al-Mohannadi elected constituent representative.

== Archaeology ==
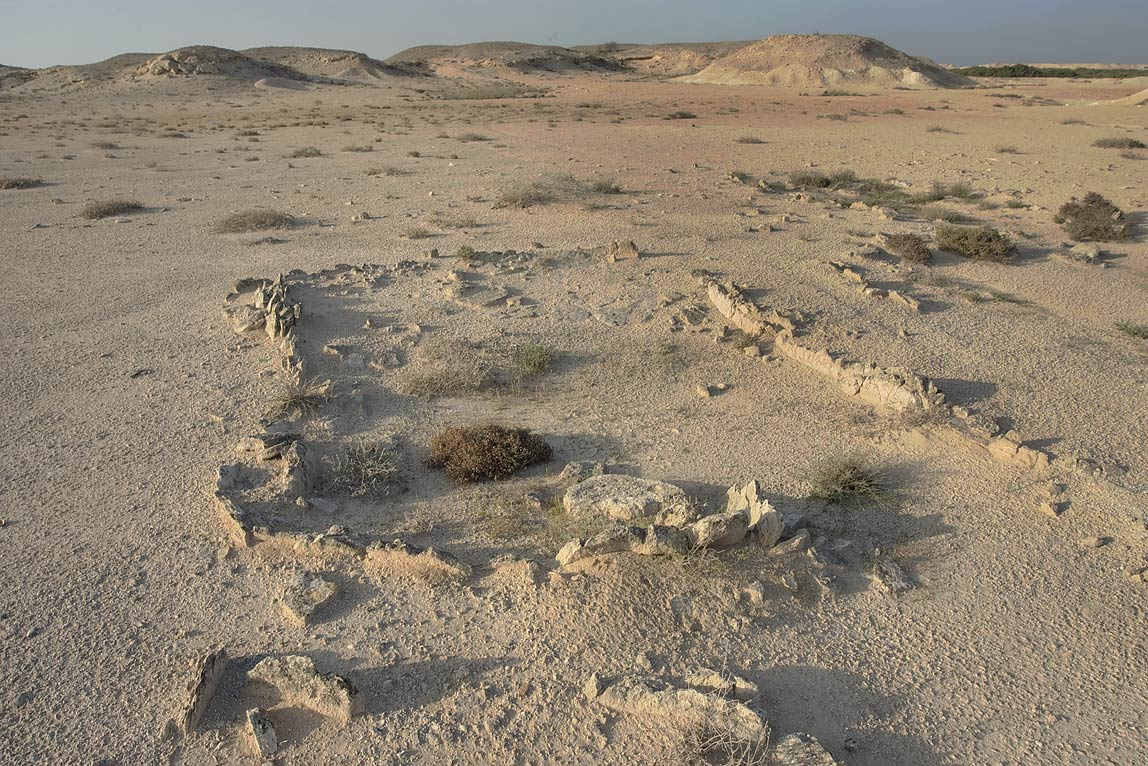
Excavation of the Kassite dye site on Al Khor Island

Due to its sheltered bay, wealth of mangroves, and favourable geography, Al Khor has been inhabited for thousands of years and has several archaeological sites of interest. Ruins of a workshop, residences, and a cemetery have been discovered within city confines, and pottery has been unearthed which evidences trade relations between Al Khor's ancient inhabitants and nearby civilisations.

=== Al Khor Island ===
At Al Khor Island off the bay, excavations have uncovered four main periods of occupation, dating from as early as c. 2000 BC to as late as 1900 AD. The island is best known for being the site of operation of a Kassite-controlled purple dye industry in the second millennium BC.

=== Neolithic cemetery ===
A cemetery of at least 18 cairns is found in Wadi Al Jalta, approximately 2 kilometres (1.2 mi) west of the city, situated atop a hillock and separated from the city by a sabkha (a type of salt flat). It was uncovered in 1976 by the French Archaeological Mission in Qatar and was dubbed "F.P.P." in the team's reports. Béatrix Midant-Reynes, a member of the team, excavated eight of the burial mounds starting in 1976. The first grave excavated had a length of roughly 2.6 metres (8.5 ft), a width of 1.6 metres (5.2 ft), and was 20 centimetres (7.9 in) tall. Two roof slabs that measured 40 by 50 centimetres (16 by 20 in) and 60 by 30 centimetres (24 by 12 in), respectively, were used as cover for the cairn. Four layers of stone slabs were found in the mound. Underneath the slabs was a sandy pit containing sea snail shells.

The second grave excavated by the team was more substantial in size, having a length of 3.5 metres (11 ft), a width of 3 metres (9.8 ft), and stood 30 metres (98 ft). Decayed skeletal remains were uncovered in this grave. Similar to the other grave, flat stone slabs were also discovered in this mound, some fitted into the bedrock, however, no pit was found. Fifteen sea snails were discovered inside this cairn.

More substantial finds were recovered from the next six excavations. The team concluded that some graves were reserved for individuals while others were family burials. Artifacts uncovered included shell beads, obsidian beads, and carnelian beads. The cairns are of indeterminable age but are thought to date from some time in the Neolithic period, possibly from 5,000 to 6,000 years ago. It has been speculated that, as sea levels would have been approximately 2 metres (6.6 ft) higher, the hillock containing the burial sites would have presented as an island during that period.

== Demographics ==
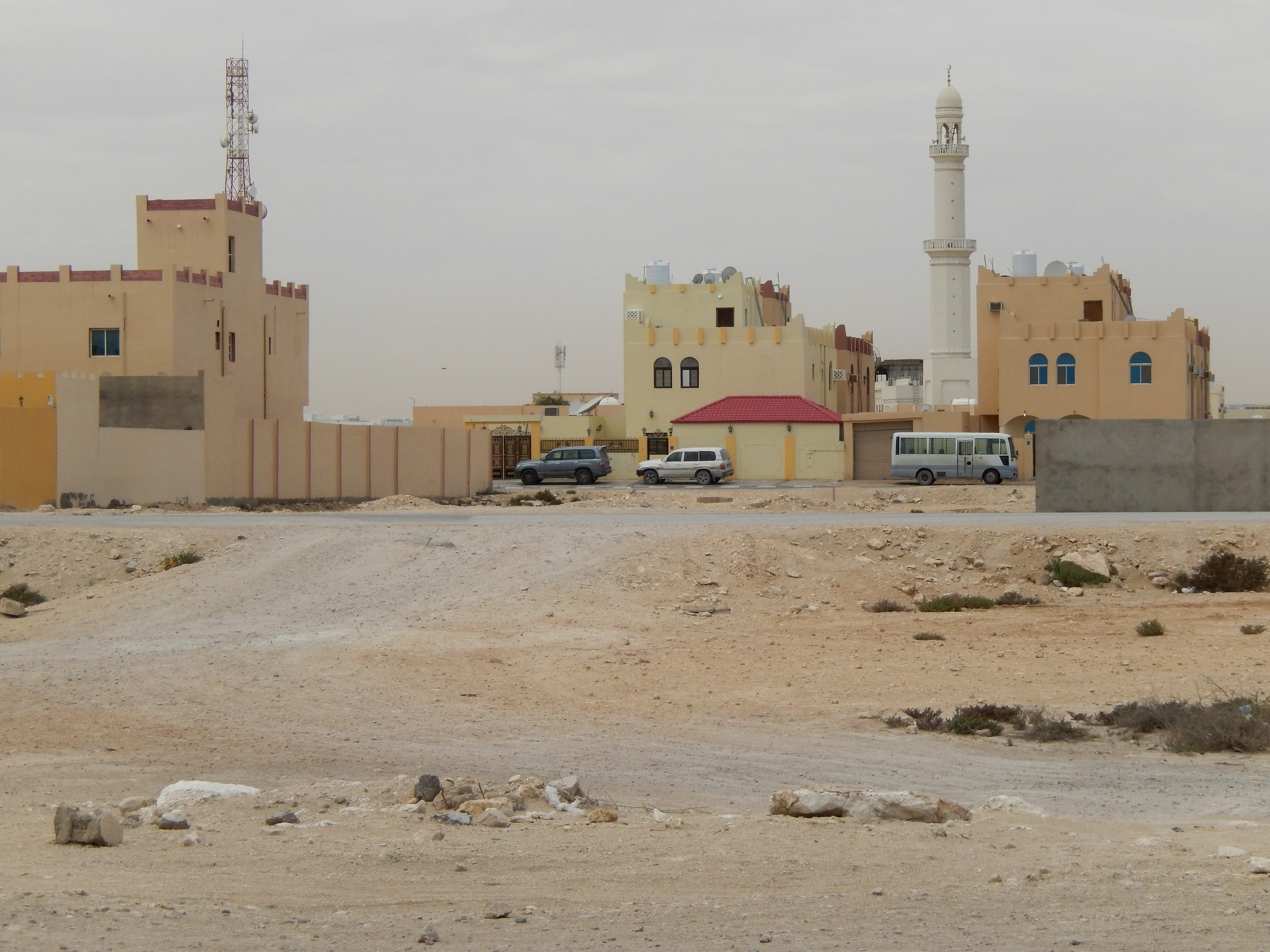
Residential neighbourhood

Al Khor Population
Year	Population
1986	8,993
1997	17,793
2004	31,547

== Twin towns and sister cities ==
- Chita, Japan (since 2004)
- Gangnam, South Korea (since 2009)
