= List of historical monuments in Qatar =

The State of Qatar contains several historical sites protected by the Qatar Museums Authority, one of which is classified as Unesco World Heritage, Al Zubarah Archaeological Site.

== List of heritage areas ==
Heritage Area number	Name	Image	Agency	Type of Monument	Location/Coordinates	Date Established	Description	Opening Timings
HAR10278	Al Zubarah Archaeological Site		Qatar Museums	Archeological Site	(N25° 58.623 E51° 1.727) QNG (181264 – 469096)	1760	Town ruins from an 18th century pearling and merchant town, located on the north western coast of the Qatar peninsula in the Al Shamal municipality, about 105 km from the Qatari capital of Doha. It also includes the iconic Al Zubarah Fort.	9 am to 5 pm
HAR10180	Freiha Archaeological Site		Qatar Museums	Archeological Site	GPS Coordinates (N26° 0.909 E51° 2.500) QNG (182559 – 473316)	18th to the mid-19th century		Prior to visit, please contact Qatar Museums
HAR10306	Al Ruwaida Archaeological Site		Qatar Museums	Archeological Site	GPS Coordinates (N 26° 5.016 E 51° 8.832) QNG (193128 – 480889)	end of the 18th century	Town ruins in northern Qatar.	Prior to visit, please contact Qatar Museums
HAR20829	Murwab Archaeological Site		Qatar Museums	Archeological Site	GPS Coordinates (N25° 51.548 E51° 01.270) QNG (180482 – 456034)	1985	An archaeological site in northwest Qatar.	Prior to visit, please contact Qatar Museums
HAR1891	Barzan Towers		Qatar Museums	Architectural Heritage	GPS Coordinates (N25° 25.073 E51° 24.798) QNG (219860 – 407152)	1910 and 1916		
HAR4161	Al Khor Towers Eastern Tower		Qatar Museums	Architectural Heritage	GPS Coordinates 1-(N25° 41.303 E 51° 30.371) QNG (229139 – 437135)	20th Century		
HAR668	Al Khor Towers Southern Tower		Qatar Museums	Architectural Heritage	(N25° 41.281 E 51° 30.264) QNG (228960 – 437094)	20th Century		
HAR669	Al Khor Towers Western Tower		Qatar Museums	Architectural Heritage	(N25° 41.348 E51° 30.049) QNG (228603 – 437211)	20th Century		
HAR3552	Ain Hleetan Well		Qatar Museums	Architectural Heritage	GPS Coordinates (N25° 41.358 E51° 30.069) QNG (228635 – 437230)	20th Century		
HAR3546	Old Amiri Palace		Qatar Museums	Architectural Heritage	GPS Coordinates (N25° 17.276 E51° 32.899) QNG (233479 – 392783)	20th Century		Entrance via National Museum of Qatar
HAR1662	Ar Rakiyat Fort		Qatar Museums	Architectural Heritage	Access: 2 km off-road GPS Coordinates (N26° 03.075 E51° 07.825) QNG (191444 – 477303)			
HAR10143	Ath Thaqab Fort		Qatar Museums	Architectural Heritage	Access: 3.5 km off-road GPS Coordinates (N26° 1.962 E51° 7.028) QNG (190115 – 475252)			Not open to the public
HAR10061	Al Jumail Heritage Village		Qatar Museums	Architectural Heritage	Access: 0.5 km off-road GPS Coordinates (N26° 5.699 E51° 9.292) QNG (193895 – 482150)			Prior to visit, please contact Qatar Museums
HAR294	Al Jassasiya East Rock Art Site		Qatar Museums	Archaeological Site and Natural Heritage	GPS Coordinates (N25° 57.208 E51° 24.395) QNG (219099 – 466484)			9 am to 5 pm
HAR351	Al Jassasiya West Rock Art Site		Qatar Museums	Archaeological Site and Natural Heritage				9 am to 5 pm
HAR2023	Jazirat Bin Ghannam Archaeological and Natural Heritage Site		Qatar Museums	Cultural and Natural Heritage	GPS Coordinates (N 25° 41.553 E 51° 32.990) QNG (233519 – 437607)			
HAR689	Zekreet Fort		Qatar Museums	Archaeological Site and Natural Heritage	GPS Coordinates (N25° 29.405 E50° 50.676) QNG (162665 – 415190)			9 am to 5 pm
	Zekreet Datepress		Qatar Museums	Archaeological Site				9 am to 5 pm

== See also ==
- Archaeology of Qatar
- List of archaeological sites by country#Qatar
