= Al Khor Towers =

Group of three watchtowers in Qatar

Coordinates: 25°41.303′N 51°30.371′E

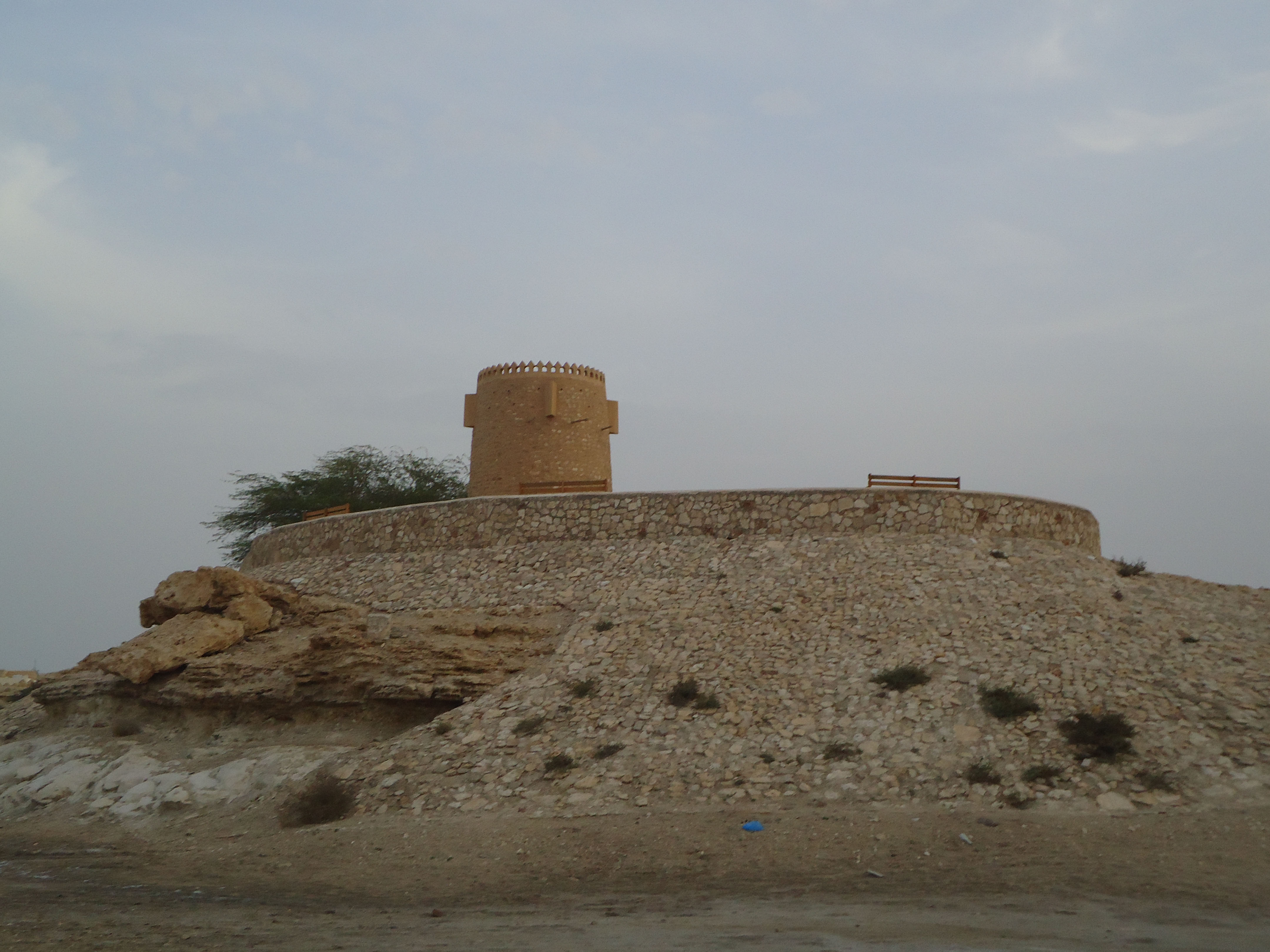
- One of the Al Khor Towers
- Built: 1900

The Al Khor Towers are three historical watchtowers found on Qatar's eastern coast, in the city of Al Khor. Having been built overlooking the Al Khor Harbour, their purpose was defensive; not only keeping watch over incoming ships, but also positioned to observe the Ain Hleetan Well. This particular well, believed to confer magical properties unto those who nourished themselves with its water, was the primary lifeline for settlement at Al Khor.

== History ==
The towers are thought to date to c. 1900.

== Architecture ==
Their walls are roughly 60 centimetres (24 in)-thick. Barrel-like in shape, the materials used to construct them was a mixture of mud and locally derived stone. They are each approximately 8 meters (26 ft)-tall, allowing the guards stationed atop them with an ideal vantage point. Arrow-shaped designs were carved into the parapets. Tiny openings near the tower roofs were created with the intent of offering protection to defenders who would lob projectiles in cases of invasion. Ropes were required to reach the top of the towers.

== See also ==
- List of historical monuments in Qatar
