= Bani Hajer =

Tribe in the Arabian Peninsula

Bani Hajer (Arabic: بني هاجر), also known as al-Hawajir, are an influential tribe in the Arabian Peninsula. The tribe is also called Bani Hajer (Family surnames: Al-Hajri) in Egypt eastern Saudi Arabia and other Arab states of the Persian Gulf (Qatar, UAE, Bahrain, Kuwait, Oman).

They are known for their trade with other tribes and families, as well as bringing foreign goods to Arabia.

Al Hawajer are a Qahtanite tribe from Abida, they resides near Sarat Abida also known as "alhirja" near Thahran Al Janoub. They were led shiekh Mohammed Bin Shaba'an in the early 13th century as they migrated to Lower Najd. When their shiekh became Shafi bin Safar bin Mohammed Bin Shaba'an they migrated once more towards the eastern village of Al Ahsa'a. Their current shiekh is Nasser Bin Hamoud Bin Sahfi Bin Salim Bin Shafi Bin Safar Bin Mohammed Bin Shaba'an. Some of them ventured into Qatar and resided there since, the majority of them are in Saudi Arabia across various regions such as South and Eastern regions, Mount Ladam from the north and al Saaa'dani from west.

They are considered Nomadic Bedouins, though some of them have moved to cities and settled. They held government offices and facilities specifically in their new home town "Ain Dar", Salasil, Yakrub, Fouda, Al Sharmiah, Al Asidiah, Al Fardaniah, Aboukola, Al Rafiah, Al Nasibiah and others.

== Kinzan Battle ==
They were given the title of "Khaznat Thafar" or the Vault of Victory by King Abdulaziz Al Saud for their Bravery in Al Ahsa'a Battle Against Al Ajman, in 1333 AH (1914 or 1915 AD). King Abdulaziz headed to Kanzan in Al Ahsaa to stop the atrocities of Al Ajman against civilians as they pillaged and hijacked anyone who crosses their path, as King Abdulaziz called other tribes to his aid few joined him, until the Al Hajri tribe led by Shafi bin Salim Al Sahfi Al Hajri and his tribesmen joined the battle, this is when battle turned in the King's favour. During the battle Al Ajman ambushed King Abdulaziz and nearly killed him with a sword hit that slashed his abdomen and succeeded in killing King Abdulaziz brother Sa'ad Bin Abdulrahman.

After the victory they were summoned by King Abdulaziz and asked them for whatever they desired. Their Sheikh requested the land they reside on to be theirs (from ain Dar all the way to the border of Qatar also known as "Jouf Bani Hajer" and also for none of their tribesmen to be beheaded or to have their hands amputated "in case one of them killed or stole". All their requests were granted by King Abdulaziz and also gave them the title of " Khaznat Thafar" or the Vault of Victory.
