= Faras (name) =

Faras (Arabic: فرس) is both an Arabic surname and masculine given name. Notable people with the name include:

== Given name ==
- Faras Hamdan (1910–1966), Israeli Arab politician
- Faras Saleh, Iraqi basketball player

== Surname ==
- Ahmed Faras (1946–2025), Moroccan footballer
- João Faras, astrologer, astronomer, physician

== See also ==
- Faras (disambiguation)
- Faraz
- Faraaz
