= Zone 76, Qatar =

Zone 76
- Zone
- Interactive map of Zone 76
- Coordinates: 25.818735°N 51.174241°E
- Country: Qatar
- Municipality: Al Khor
- Blocks: 42

Area
  - Total: 628.6 km^{2} (242.7 sq mi)

Population
  - Total: 5,744 (2,015)
- Time zone: UTC+03 (Arabia Standard Time)
- ISO 3166 code: QA-KH

Zone 76 is a zone of the municipality of Al Khor in the state of Qatar. The main district recorded in the 2015 population census was Al Ghuwariyah.

Other districts which fall within its administrative boundaries are Abu Al Qararis, Rawdat Al Faras, and Umm Al Maa.

== Demographics ==
As of the 2010 census, the zone comprised 315 housing units and 173 establishments. There were 4,834 people living in the zone, of which 80% were male and 20% were female. Out of the 4,834 inhabitants, 93% were 20 years of age or older and 7% were under the age of 20. The literacy rate stood at 95.1%.

Employed persons made up 91% of the total population. Females accounted for 3% of the working population, while males accounted for 97% of the working population.

| Year | Population |
|---|---|
| 1986 | 1,629 |
| 1997 | 1,716 |
| 2004 | 2,159 |
| 2010 | 4,834 |
| 2015 | 5,744 |

== Land use ==
The Ministry of Municipality and Environment (MME) breaks down land use in the zone as follows.

| Area (km^{2}) | Developed land (km^{2}) | Undeveloped land (km^{2}) | Residential (km^{2}) | Commercial/ Industrial (km^{2}) | Education/ Health (km^{2}) | Farming/ Green areas (km^{2}) | Other uses (km^{2}) |
|---|---|---|---|---|---|---|---|
| 628.58 | 90.19 | 538.39 | 0.15 | 0.04 | 0.12 | 77.07 | 12.81 |
