= Al Khor Industrial Area =

Al Khor Industrial Area صناعية الخور
- Industrial area
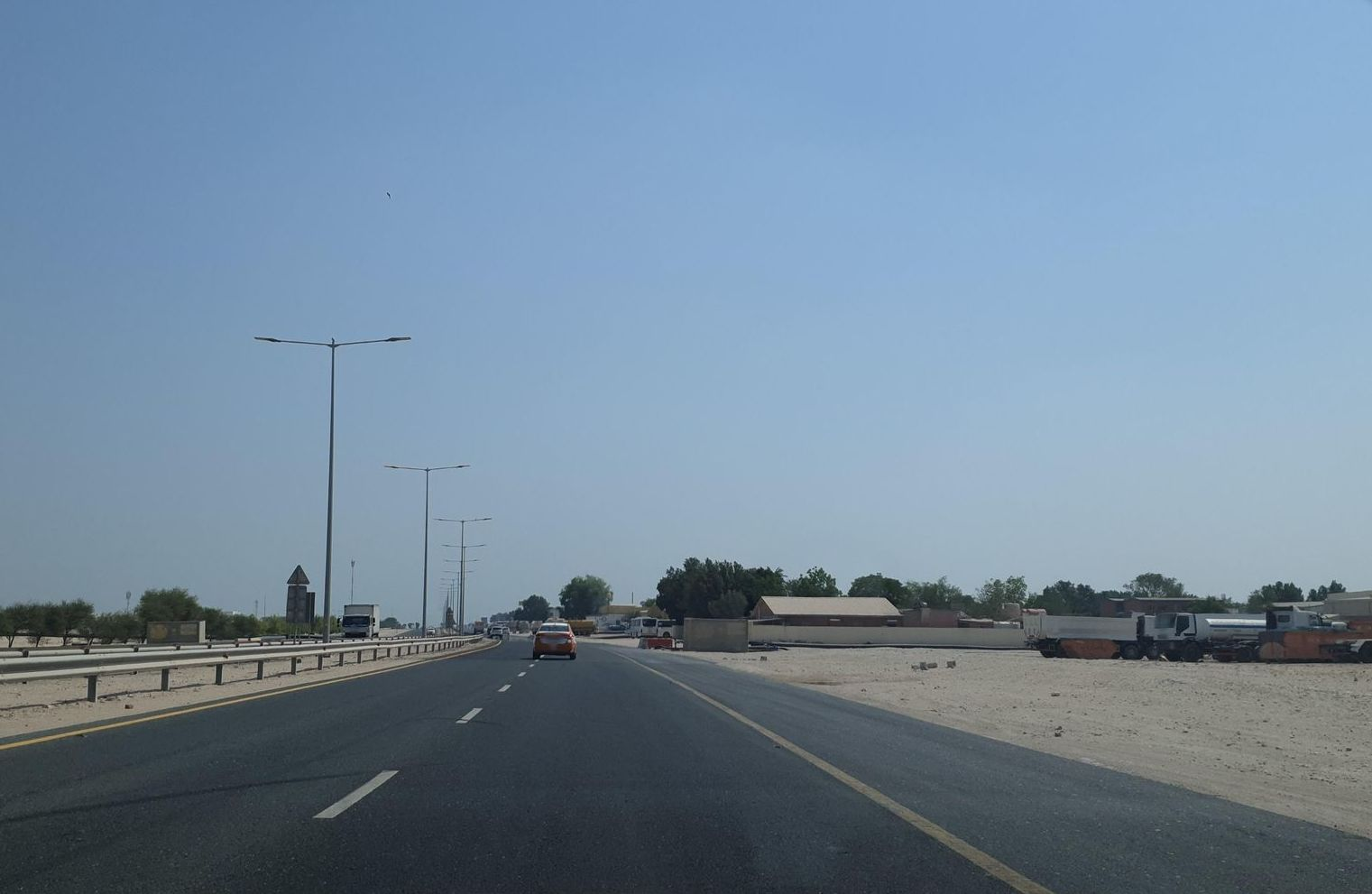
- Umm Birka Road in Al Khor Industrial Area

- Location in Qatar
- Coordinates: 25°42′46.5″N 51°29′55.9″E
- Country: Qatar
- Municipality: Al Khor
- Zone: Zone 74
- District no.: 270

Area
  - Total: 0.46 sq mi (1.2 km^{2})

Al Khor Industrial Area (Arabic: صناعية الخور; also known as Umm Qayn) is an industrial zone in Qatar located in the municipality of Al Khor. It is situated between Al Khor City, the municipal seat, and Al Thakhira. The government placed a moratorium on the area in 2005 but lifted it in 2017.

== History ==
In 2005, the Ministry of Municipality and Urban Planning froze all building permits in the area, opting to create a new industrial area closer to Umm Birka and Simaisma instead. Over the following years, infrastructure in the Al Khor Industrial Area suffered; the buildings were in disrepair and debris lined the streets. Rent prices were drastically raised in both the Al Khor Industrial Area and its neighboring areas, and some companies based in the area had to suspend their projects. The Al Khor Municipal Council petitioned the ministry to lift the moratorium in order to boost economic growth, and in 2017 the ministry obliged.

== Infrastructure ==
In December 2014, Ashghal (The Public Works Authority) signed a $16.8 million contract with ALCAT Contracting Qatar to refurbish the industrial area amidst its plan to reopen the area for business. As part of the project, a 9 km-long boundary wall will surround the premises. The project had a planned start date of early 2015 and an estimated completion date of late 2015.

Numerous car repair shops, fabrication workshops and carpentry factories are based in the Al Khor Industrial Area, although industrial growth was virtually non-existent from 2005 to 2017 due to the expansion ban. Industrial companies with a presence in the area include a branch of Buzwair Scientific and Technical Gases, a plant machinery and vehicles workshop and a fabrication workshop belonging to Al Jaber Engineering, and the headquarters of the Seashore Group.

== Sports ==
Barwa Al Khor formally opened Al Khor Workers Sports Complex in the Al Khor Industrial Area in February 2014. Intended to serve the entire municipality of Al Khor as well as portions of Al Shamal Municipality, the sporting facilities within this massive complex include four cricket fields, four football fields, four basketball courts and three volleyball courts. In addition, there are 35 shops, 2 cinemas and a mosque among its facilities. In 2015, over 500,000 people had visited the complex. On certain occasions such as Qatar National Day, the venue hosts cultural events.
