= Faras (disambiguation) =

Faras may refer to the following subjects:

- Faras, city in Lower Nubia
  - Faras Cathedral, cathedral in the Lower Nubian
- Faras Gallery at the National Museum in Warsaw, Polish art museum
- Coptic Diocese of Faras, Coptic Orthodox Church diocese in Sudan
- Rawdat Al Faras, village in Qatar
- Khirbat Al Faras, Syrian city
- Faras (name)

== See also ==
- Fara (disambiguation)
