= List of airports in Qatar =

This is a list of airports in Qatar.

== Airports ==
City served	Municipality	ICAO	IATA	Airport name	Coordinates
Civil airports					
Al Khor	Al Khor	OTBK		Al Khor Airport	25°37′46″N 051°30′24″E
Doha	Doha	OTBD	DIA	Doha International Airport	25°15′40″N 051°33′54″E
Doha	Doha	OTHH	DOH	Hamad International Airport	25°15′40″N 051°36′48″E
Military airports					
Doha	Doha	OTBH	XJD	Al Udeid Air Base (Abu Nakhlah Airport)	25°07′02″N 051°18′53″E
Dukhan	Al-Shahaniya			Dukhan / Tamim Airbase	25°27′16.8″N 050°59′18.6″E

== See also ==
- Old Airport (Doha), a city district
- Transport in Qatar
- List of airports by ICAO code: O#OT - Qatar
- Wikipedia:WikiProject Aviation/Airline destination lists: Asia#Qatar
