= Al Egda =

Al Egda العقدة
- District
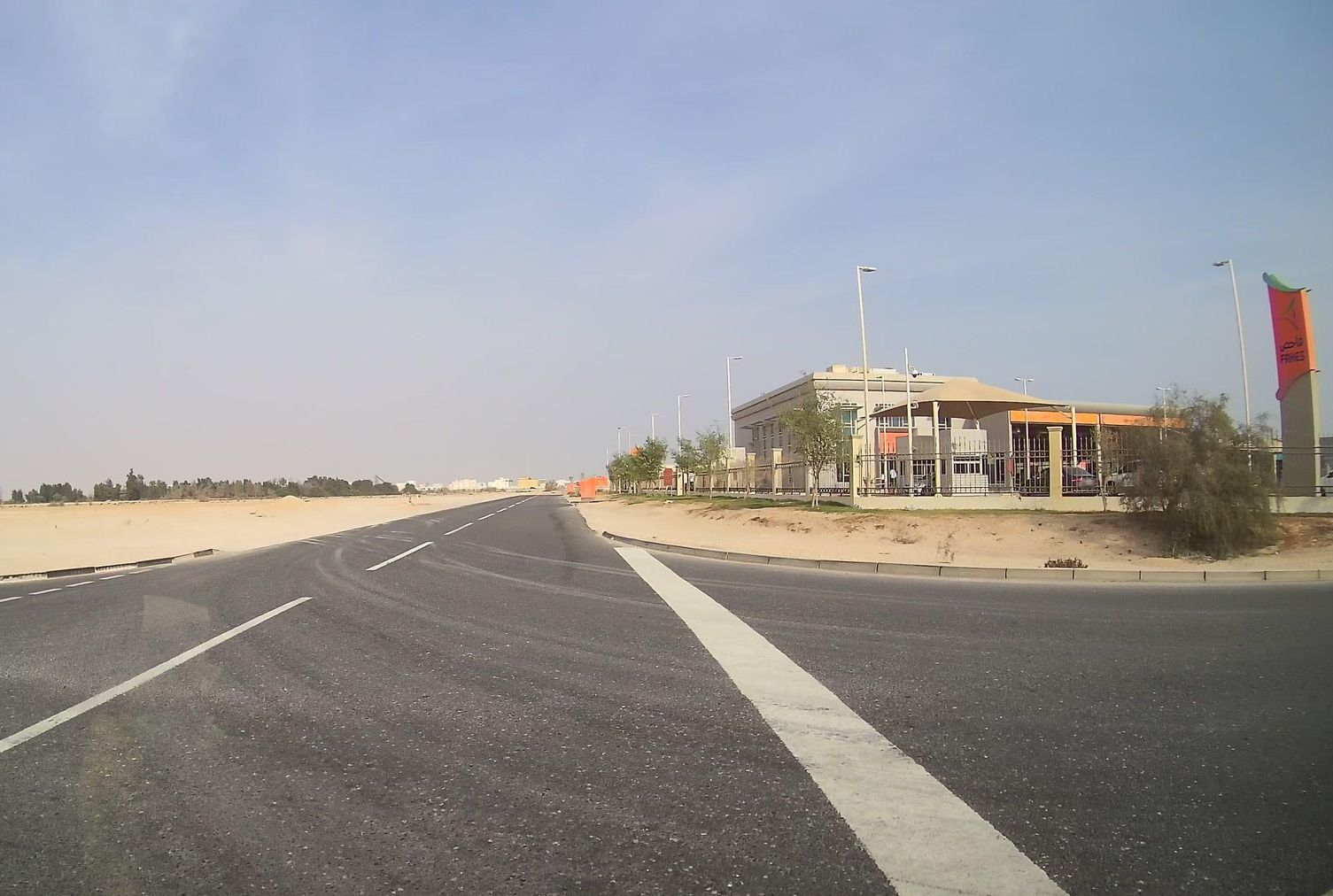
- Looking towards Street 217 in Al Egda, near the Woqod Vehicle Inspection Center (FAHES).

- Location in Qatar
- Coordinates: 25°41′11″N 51°28′08″E
- Country: Qatar
- Municipality: Al Khor
- Zone: Zone 74
- District no.: 282

Area
  - Total: 2.6 sq mi (6.7 km^{2})

Al Egda (Arabic: العقدة; also spelled Al Oqda and Al Uqdah) is a district in Qatar located in the municipality of Al Khor. It is located on the outskirts of Al Khor City, the municipal seat, and is considered to be a district of the city. The hill Mashaf Al Egda is nearby to the south.

== Etymology ==
The Arabic word oqda is roughly translated to "hold on to" in English. As the area is a rawda (depression), it would collect and retain vast amounts of water and sediments during rainy season, hence its name.

== Infrastructure ==
Al Uqdah Equestrian Complex opened to the public in 2013. Strategically centered just outside Al Khor City, it is one of the most important equestrian facilities in the country. It accommodates no less than 1,000 horses, and its infrastructure includes a horse training area, indoor show halls and outdoor arenas.

In 2015 the Public Works Authority included Al Egda in a project geared towards improving the sewage and road infrastructure, alongside Al Heedan and Al Khor City. Since then, the Al Khor Municipal Council has requested that the government distribute housing vouchers in the district. According to statements made by government officials in March 2017, the infrastructure projects in Al Egda will be completed by 2020 in order to meet the needs of 254 housing vouchers which had been allocated by the government.
