= Al Ghuwariyah =

Al Ghuwariyah الغويرية
- Town
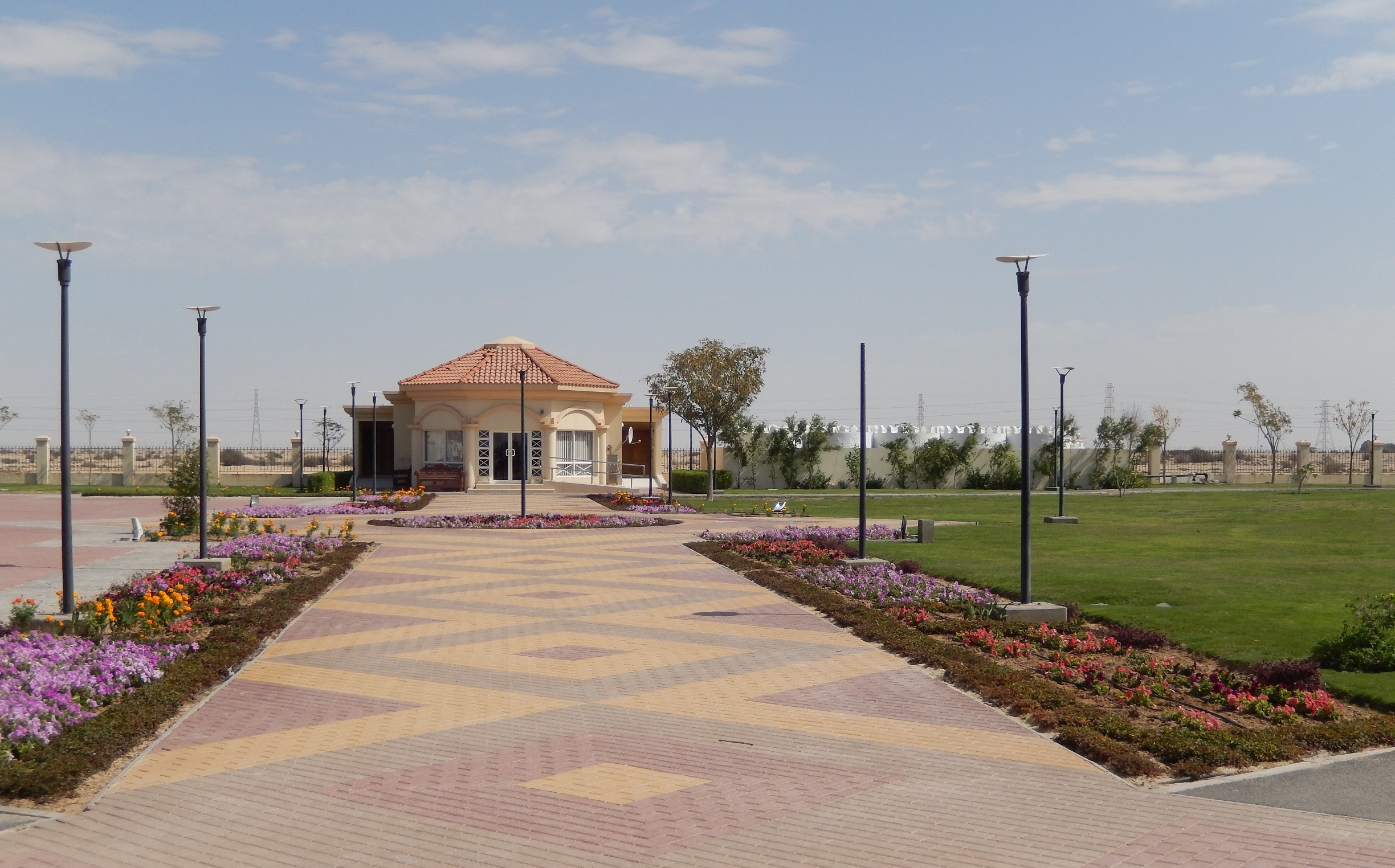
- Al Ghuwariyah Park

- Location in Qatar
- Coordinates: 25°49′46″N 51°14′43″E
- Country: Qatar
- Municipality: Al Khor
- Zone: Zone 76
- District no.: 336

Government
  - Director: Nasser Al Naimi

Area
  - Total: 12.3 km^{2} (4.7 sq mi)

Population (2021)
  - Total: 725
- Time zone: UTC+03 (East Africa Time)

Al Ghuwariyah (Arabic: الغويرية, romanized: Al-Ghuwaīriyah; also spelled Leghwairiya) is a town in Al Khor and Al Thakhira Municipality, Qatar. Al Ghuwariyah was a municipality of Qatar until 2004, when it was merged with Al Khor Municipality.

It has been populated mostly by members of the Na'im tribe since the early 1920s.

== Etymology ==
Two suggestions have been put forth for the origin of Al Ghuwariyah's name. The first states that it is derived from alghar, the Arabic term for the laurel family of plants. This is considered unlikely as this family of plants is not found in Qatar. The more plausible explanation is that the name derives from the Arabic word ghar, which translates to "cave". This is lent credence by the presence of two prominent caves nearby.

== History ==
An entry for Al Ghuwariyah can be found in J. G. Lorimer's 1908 Gazetteer of the Persian Gulf. He describes it as a nomadic camping ground 12 miles (19 km) south-west of Al Huwaila and mentions a nearby masonry well, 8 fathoms deep, that yields good water.

Based on field work carried out by anthropologist Henry Field in the 1950s, the main tribe in the area of Al Ghuwariyah were the Al Jafali tribe. Starting in 1960, the government made a concerted effort to settle the country's nomadic tribes, relocating members of the Na'im tribe here as it sat on the boundary of their tribal territory.

After Qatar started to receive substantial profits from its oil extraction activities in the 1960s and 1970s, the government launched several housing projects for its citizens. As part of this initiative, 55 houses were built in Al Ghuwariyah by 1976. In 1986, the Ministry of Municipal Affairs opened a municipal office in Al Ghuwariyah.

According to the Ministry of Municipality and Environment, there were about 65 total households within the town limits in 2014.

== Administration ==
=== Al Ghuwariyah Municipality ===
Location of Al Guwariyah Municipality

Al Ghuwariyah was a municipality until 2004, when it was merged with Al Khor. It did not administer over any other census-designated cities or towns except for itself.

In 2004 census, out of a population of 2,159, the number of Muslims amounted to 1,666, Christians amounted to 52.

Registered live births

The following table is a breakdown of registered live births by nationality and sex for Al Ghuwariyah. Places of birth are based on the home municipality of the mother at birth.

Registered live births by nationality and sex
Year	Qatari			Non-Qatari			Total		
Year	M	F	Total	M	F	Total	M	F	Total
1984	2	5	7	1	2	3	3	7	10
1985	5	1	6	2	2	4	7	3	10
1986	1	3	4	3	1	4	4	4	8
1987	6	5	11	1	3	4	7	8	15
1988	2	4	6	1	2	3	3	6	9
1989	7	6	13	2	3	5	9	9	18
1990	3	2	5	4	1	5	7	3	10
1991	3	3	6	0	0	0	3	3	6
1992	1	4	5	0	3	3	1	7	8
1993	0	4	4	1	2	3	1	6	7
1994	N/A								
1995	2	2	4	2	2	4	4	4	8

Registered live births by nationality and sex
Year	Qatari			Non-Qatari			Total		
Year	M	F	Total	M	F	Total	M	F	Total
1996	2	0	2	1	0	1	3	0	3
1997	1	4	5	1	0	1	2	4	6
1998	5	0	5	2	3	5	7	3	10
1999	1	2	3	4	4	8	5	6	11
2000	3	4	7	7	4	11	10	8	18
2001	4	1	5	2	2	4	6	3	9
2002	5	2	7	3	4	7	8	6	14
2003	6	3	9	2	5	7	8	8	16
2004	23	30	53	19	15	34	42	45	87
2005	5	5	10	7	2	9	12	7	19
2006	7	4	11	3	7	10	10	11	21
2007	2	6	8	2	1	3	4	7	11

=== Local government ===
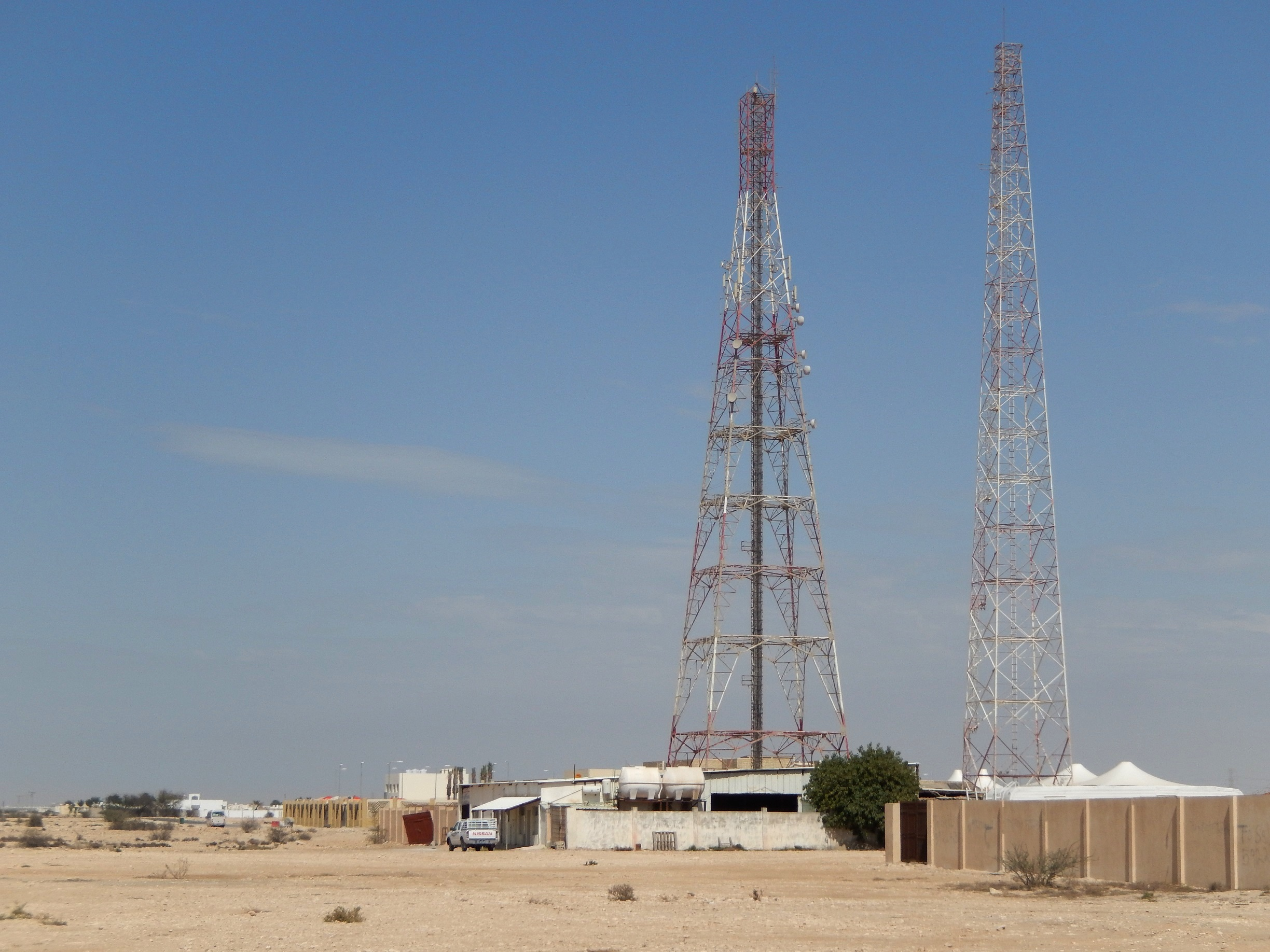
Telecommunication masts in Al Ghuwariyah

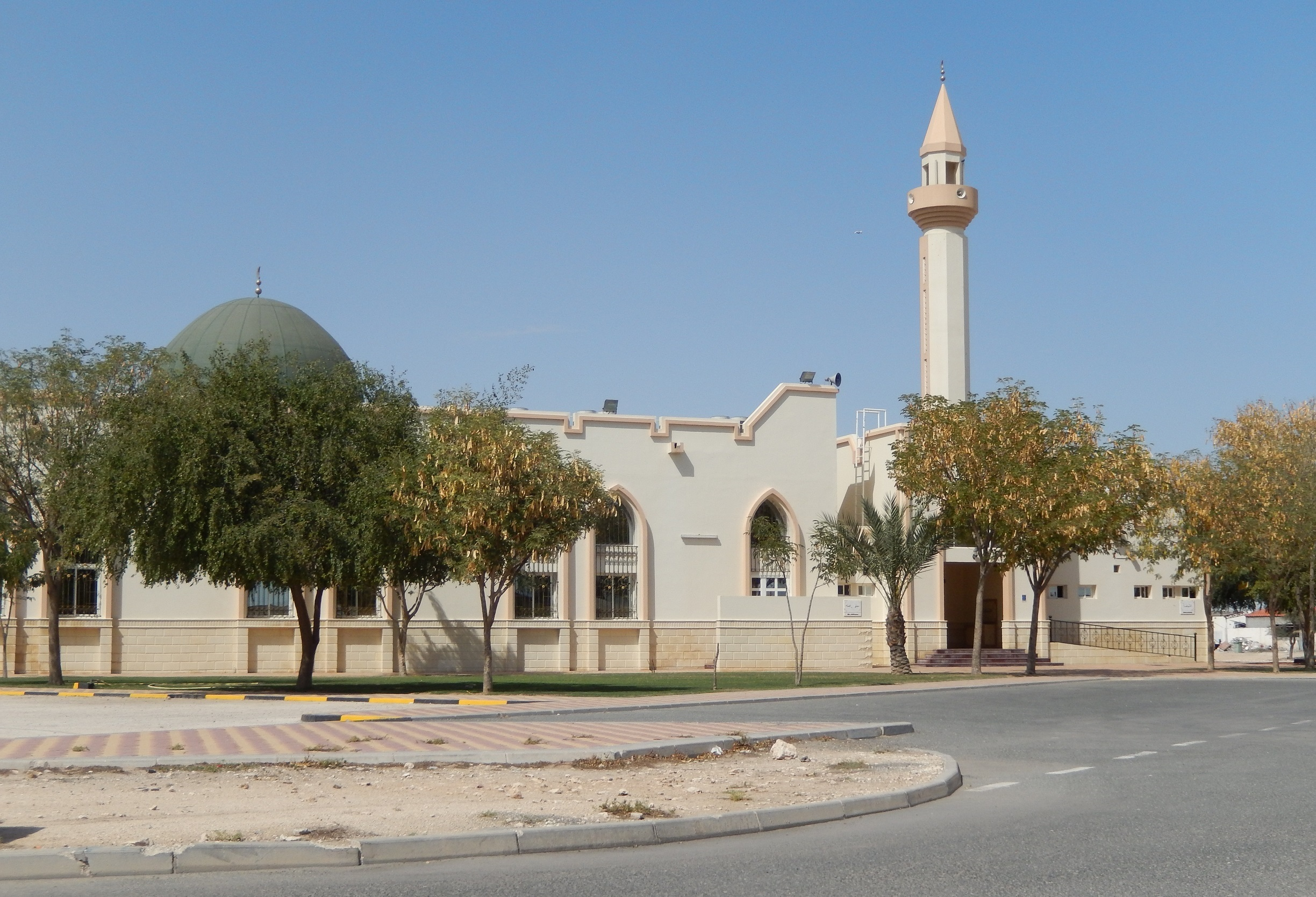
Mosque in Al Ghuwariyah

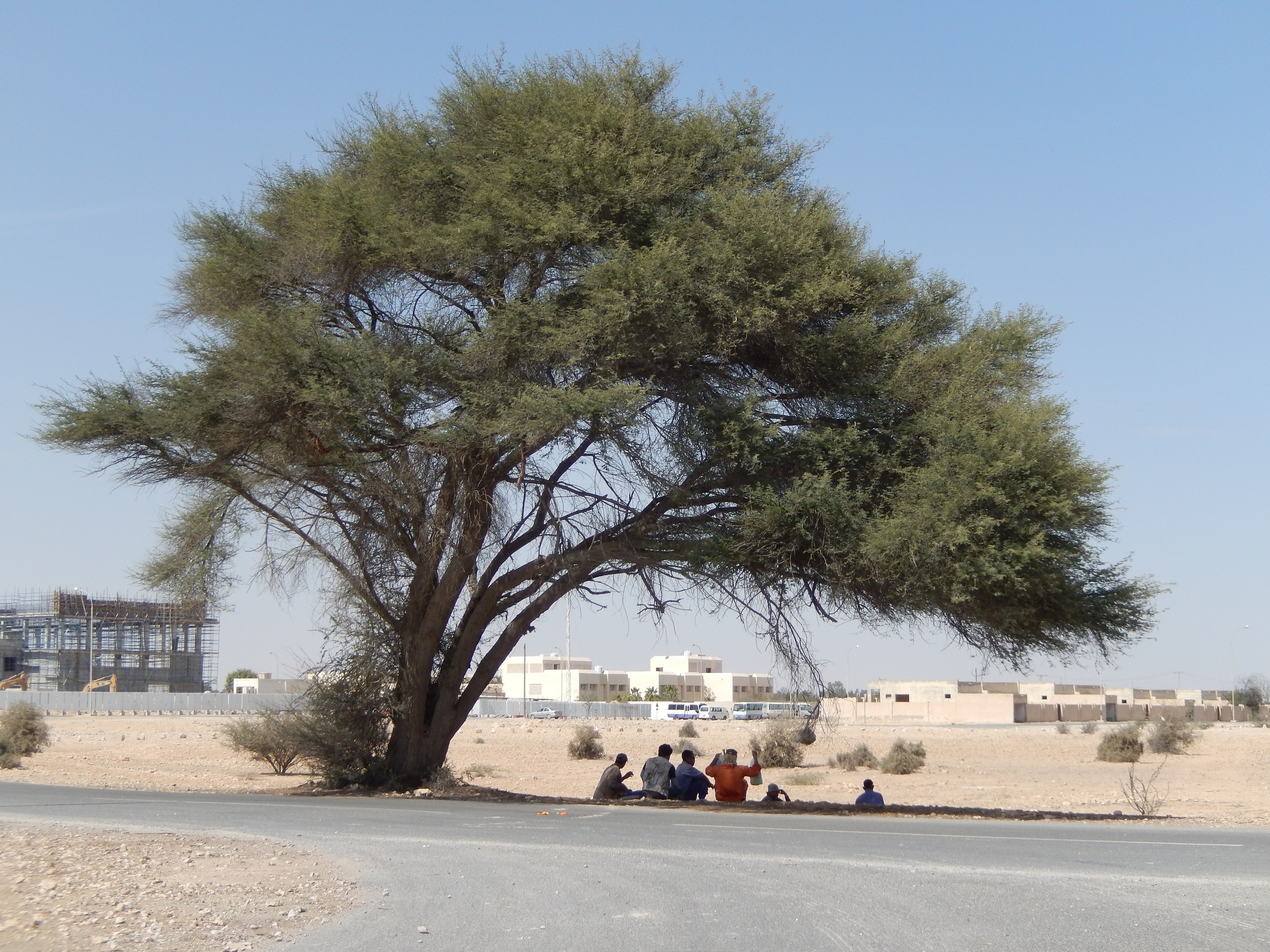
Migrant workers resting under a samr tree in Al Ghuwariyah

After free elections of the Central Municipal Council first took place in Qatar in 1999, Al Ghuwariyah was designated the seat of constituency no. 29. It would remain the headquarters of constituency no. 29 for the next three consecutive elections until the fifth municipal elections in 2015, when it was proclaimed the seat of constituency no. 28. Also included in its constituency is part of Al Suwaihliya, Umm Al Maa, Al Daoudiyah, Ain Al Nuaman, south Zubarah, Ain Sinan, and Abu Al Seneem.

In the inaugural municipal elections in 1999, Nasser Abdullah Al Kaabi won the elections, receiving 66.1%, or 115 votes. In second place was Mubarak Abdullah Al-Nuaimi, whose share of the votes was 29.3%, or 51 votes. Voter turnout was 87%. Al Kaabi retained his seat in the 2002 and 2007 elections. In 2011, Al Kaabi lost his seat to Saeed Mubarak Al Rashedi, who retained his seat in the 2015 elections.

The Al Ghuwariyah office of the Al Khor Municipality is headed by Nasser Al Nuaimi as of 2017.

== Healthcare ==
Al Ghuwariyah's first health center was opened in July 2015.

== Planned developments ==
In March 2017, the director of Al Ghuwariyah, Nasser Al Naimi, announced a major plan to upgrade the infrastructure of Al Ghuwariyah. The plan intends on improving the sewage, street maintenance and lighting of the town and adding additional sidewalks and pedestrian crossings.

== Visitor attractions ==
Al Ghuwariyah Family Park was opened in 2017. Occupying an area of 9,234 sq meters, facilities include a playground with seating, bathrooms and a guard office.

== Education ==
Name of School	Curriculum	Grade	Genders	Official Website	Ref
Al Ghuwairia Girls School	Independent	Kindergarten – Secondary	Female-only	N/A	
