= Abu Al Qararis =

Abu Al Qararis ابا القراريص
- Village
- Location in Qatar
- Coordinates: 25°44′10.4″N 51°24′19.3″E
- Country: Qatar
- Municipality: Al Khor
- Zone: Zone 76
- District no.: 318

Area
  - Total: 14.6 sq mi (37.8 km^{2})

Abu Al Qararis (Arabic: ابا القراريص, romanized: Abā al Qarārīş; also spelled Abu Al Gararees and Abu Al Qararees) is a village in Qatar located in the municipality of Al Khor. It is located next to the village of Umm Qarn.

== Etymology ==
Abu in Arabic means "father", being used in this context as a prefix for a prominent feature. The second constituent, qararis, translates to "insect bites"; it attained this name as a result of high propensity of mosquitoes that would bite people who wandered through this area.

== Infrastructure ==
An annual falconry championship has been held in Abu Al Qararis since 2013 by the Al Thakhira Youth Center. The annual Qatari Heritage Festival is also held in Abu Al Qararis. Activities at the festival include theatrical performances and educational workshops on birds, particularly falcons.
