= Ras Matbakh =

Ras Matbakh راس مطبخ
- Settlement
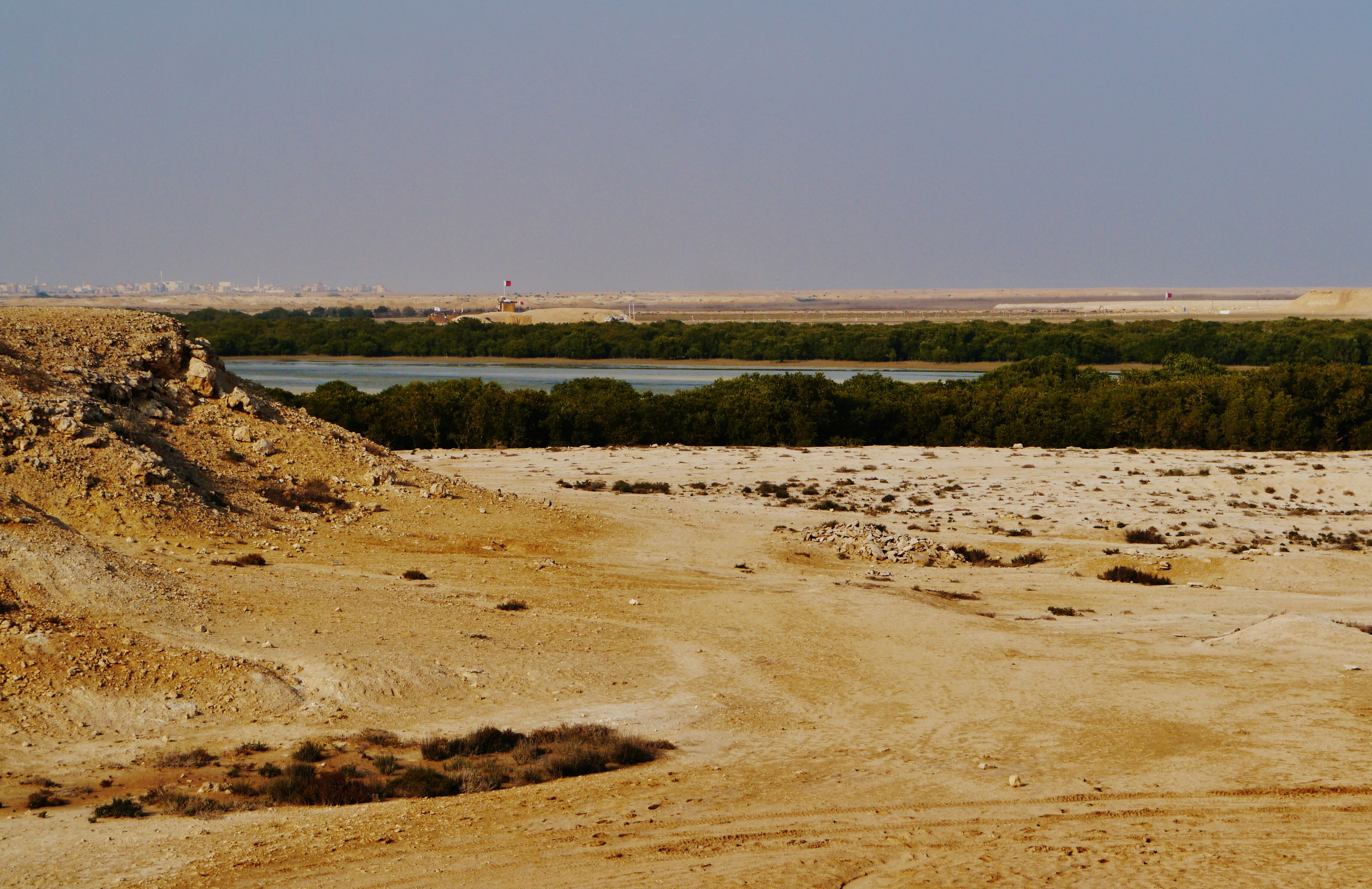
- Far view of Ras Matbakh from Al Khor Island

- Location in Qatar
- Coordinates: 25°41′00″N 51°34′00″E
- Country: Qatar
- Municipality: Al Khor
- Zone: Zone 74

Ras Matbakh (Arabic: راس مطبخ, romanized: Ra's al Maţbakh) is a settlement in Qatar located in the municipality of Al Khor. It consists of a cape extending into the Persian Gulf. Large concentrations of mangroves (Avicennia marina) are located off its coast.

It is located to the northeast of Al Khor City and to the southeast of Al Thakhira.

== Etymology ==
Ras in Arabic means "head", in this context it is being used to refer to a headland. On the other hand, matbakh is translated as "kitchen". This name was given because the area was used a massive fireplace in the past for cooking.

== History ==
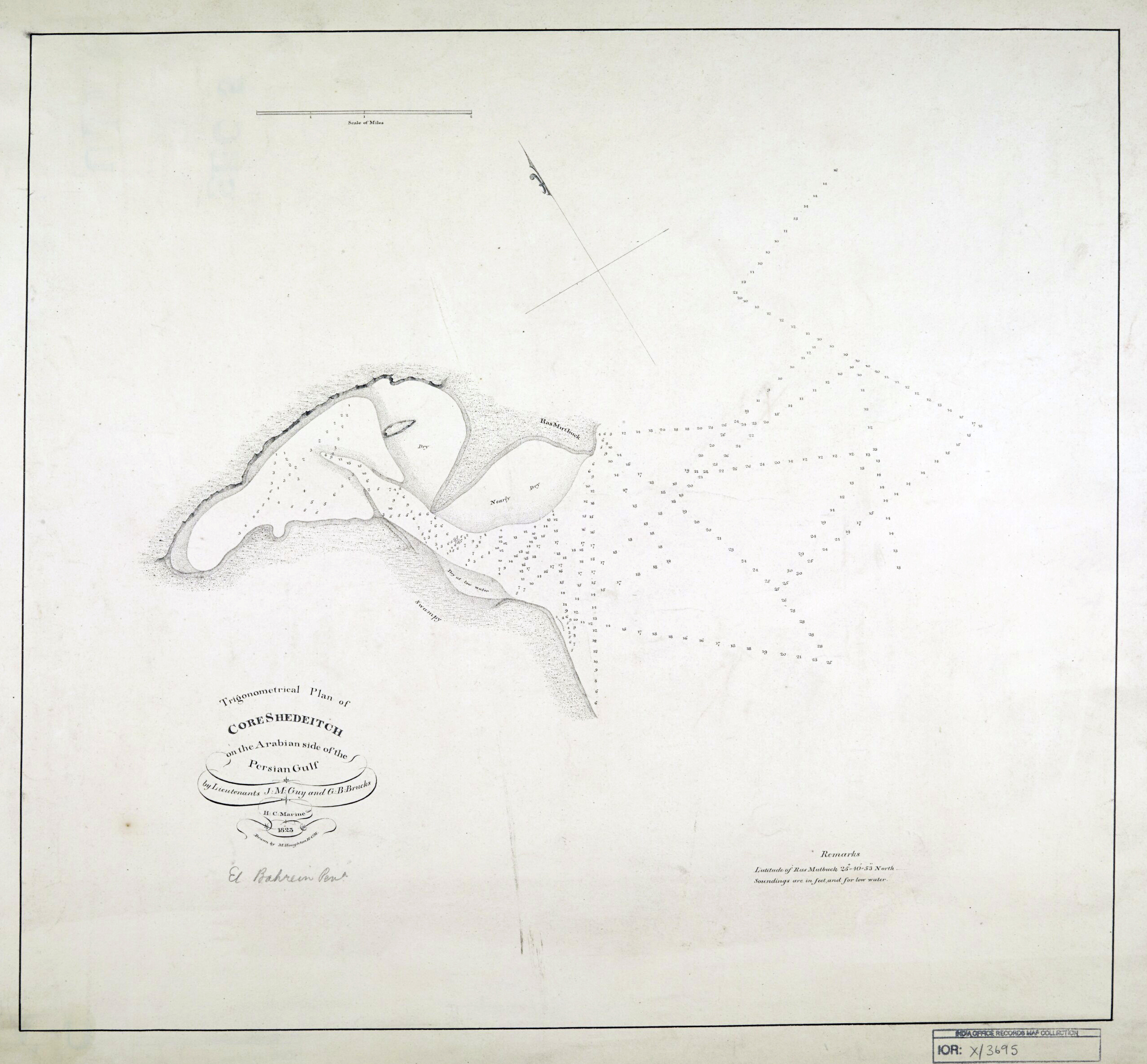
Ras Matbakh (spelled as Ras Mutbuck) in a trigonometrical plan of Al Khor produced in 1823.

In the 1820s, George Barnes Brucks carried out the first British survey of the Persian Gulf. He recorded the following notes about Ras Matbakh: "Ras Mut Buck is an elevated cape, in lat. 25° 40' N., long. 51° 36' 15' E. This cape should not be approached under four or five fathoms."

A survey conducted by the British Hydrographic Office in 1890 describes the area in significantly more detail:

"Ras Matbakh is a point 3 miles N.N.E. of [Ras Al Nuf]; between them is the entrance to a small creek and backwater, called Khor Shajij; the entrance to which has only one fathom at low water. A small village with several towers has been established here. The 3 fathoms line is 4 miles off this point, under which depth there is foul ground; there is a dry sand bank, 3 miles E. by S. of the point. Khor al Dhakira, which is also shoal, is another little creek, 3½ miles North of Matbakh.

Shoals — Between 25° 41' N. and 25° 47' N. Lat., 6 miles off shore in the neighbourhood of Ras Matbakh, a series of shoal patches were observed from Beacon. These shoals had apparently 4 or 5 feet water on them, and from 16 to 20 feet inside; they are easily seen during daylight; and the lead gives plenty of warning. As the shore is very low, the distance off may have been over estimated, as it is not visible from the deck more than 4 or 5 miles."

== Infrastructure ==
Construction of a Qatari Coast Guard station was initiated in 2014. As part of the project, two administrative structures, two supporting structures and a road were built, resulting in a developed area of 3,156 m^{2} occupying a total area of 16,995 m^{2}.

Ashghal (The Public Works Authority) announced the completion of the 101,000 square meter facility of the Aquatic Fisheries and Research Centre in Ras Matbakh in 2017. The total cost of the project was QR 237.7 million.

== Archaeology ==
During the first large-scale archaeological expedition of Qatar in the 20th century, the Danish Mission, active from 1956 to 1964, made discoveries at Ras Matbakh. The area was first introduced to archaeologists Hans Jørgen Madsen and Jens Aarup Jensen in November 1961 by Ahmed bin Jassim Al Thani, then-ruler of Al Khor. Arriving on 22 November, the two Danish archaeologists surveyed and wrote a report of the site on 23 November. They unearthed a green pot near the coastline containing long-decomposed human remains, likely those of an adult, as well as some animal bones. The Danes estimated that the pot could originate from 500 to 300 BC and stated it resembled the burial tradition and pottery design found in ancient Bahrain and Mesopotamia at that time. Thus, they postulated that it may have been a burial for a Bahraini or Mesopotamian sailor who died near the site.
