= Al Khor Community =

Al Khor Community ام عنيق (Umm Anaig)
- Township
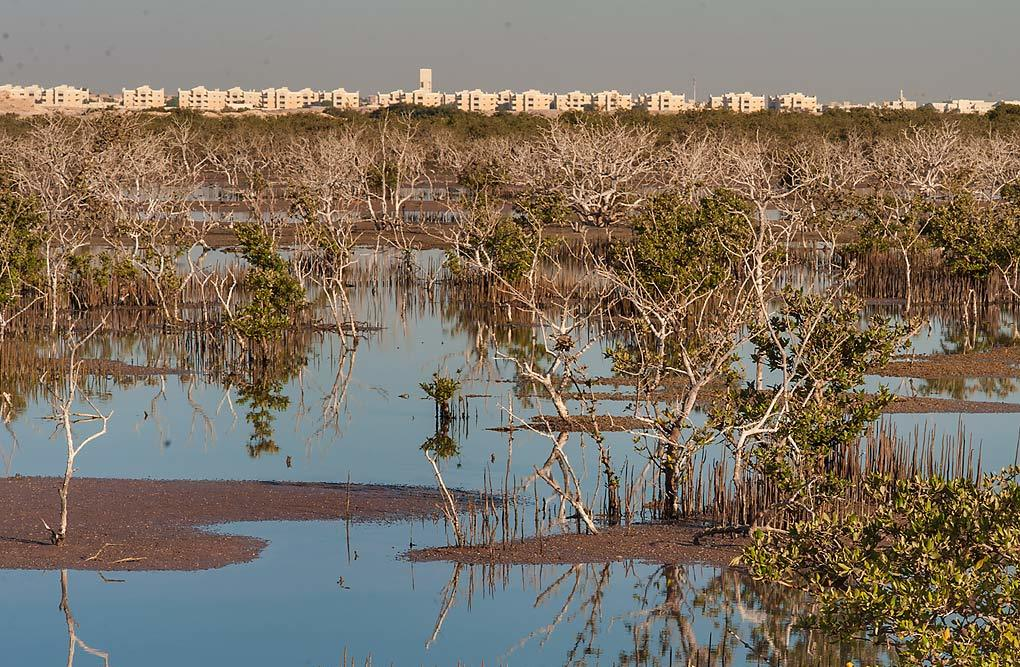
- View of Al Khor Community from Purple Island

- Location within Qatar
- Coordinates: 25.715493°N 51.532826°E
- Country: Qatar
- Municipality: Al Khor
- Zone: Zone 74
- District no.: 764
- Established: 1996

Area
  - Total: 12.9 km^{2} (5.0 sq mi)

Population
  - Estimate (2019): 15,000

Al Khor Community, also known as Umm Anaig (Arabic: ام عنيق), is a gated community on the coast of the Al Khor municipality in Qatar, over 50 kilometres (31 mi) from the capital Doha. It is situated between Al Khor City and the town of Al Thakhira and is exclusive to employees of the LNG industry in nearby Ras Laffan (mostly QatarEnergy LNG) and their families. As the largest housing community in the country, it is designated as a township by Ministry of Municipality and Environment. The community consists of villas and townhouses which accommodate around 15,000 residents, and contains three schools, a medical center, recreational facilities, a post office and a library. There are three clubhouses in the community which are used by the residents of the community.

== History ==
First conceived of in the 1990s by Qatargas, today QatarEnergy LNG, as a residential area for its employees, Al Khor Community was officially opened and received its first tenants in 1996. QatarEnergy LNG contracted Qatar Real Estate Investment Company to plan and construct the community. Later in 2001, the first employees of Rasgas moved into the community.

A recreational facility known as Al Dhakhira Club was established in 1997. The club hosts a barbershop, a south-east Asian restaurant, a children's play area, a lounge and several sports courts.

== Etymology ==
The official name of Al Khor Community is Umm Anaig. Umm, the first constituent, is Arabic for "mother" and is a common prefix for denoting geographic qualities. Being situated in a rawda (depression) with a small hill within it, the word anaig derives from onq – Arabic for "neck" – in reference to the shape of the hill.

== Education ==
- Al Khor International School (AKIS) British Stream, a British Curriculum school, offers education from kindergarten through secondary school.
- AKIS Indian Stream, an Indian Curriculum school established in 2002, offers education from kindergarten through secondary school.
- AKIS Nursery is a preschool which teaches in English. It has now been closed.

== Gallery ==
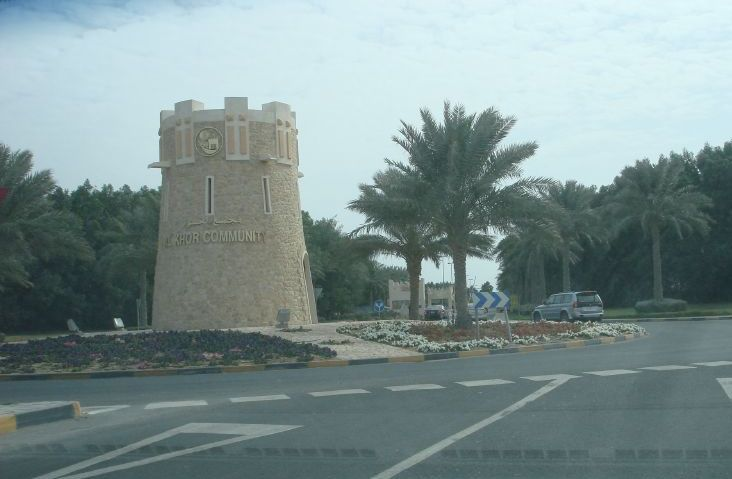
A fort entrance sign to Al Khor Community
