= Al Khor Airport =

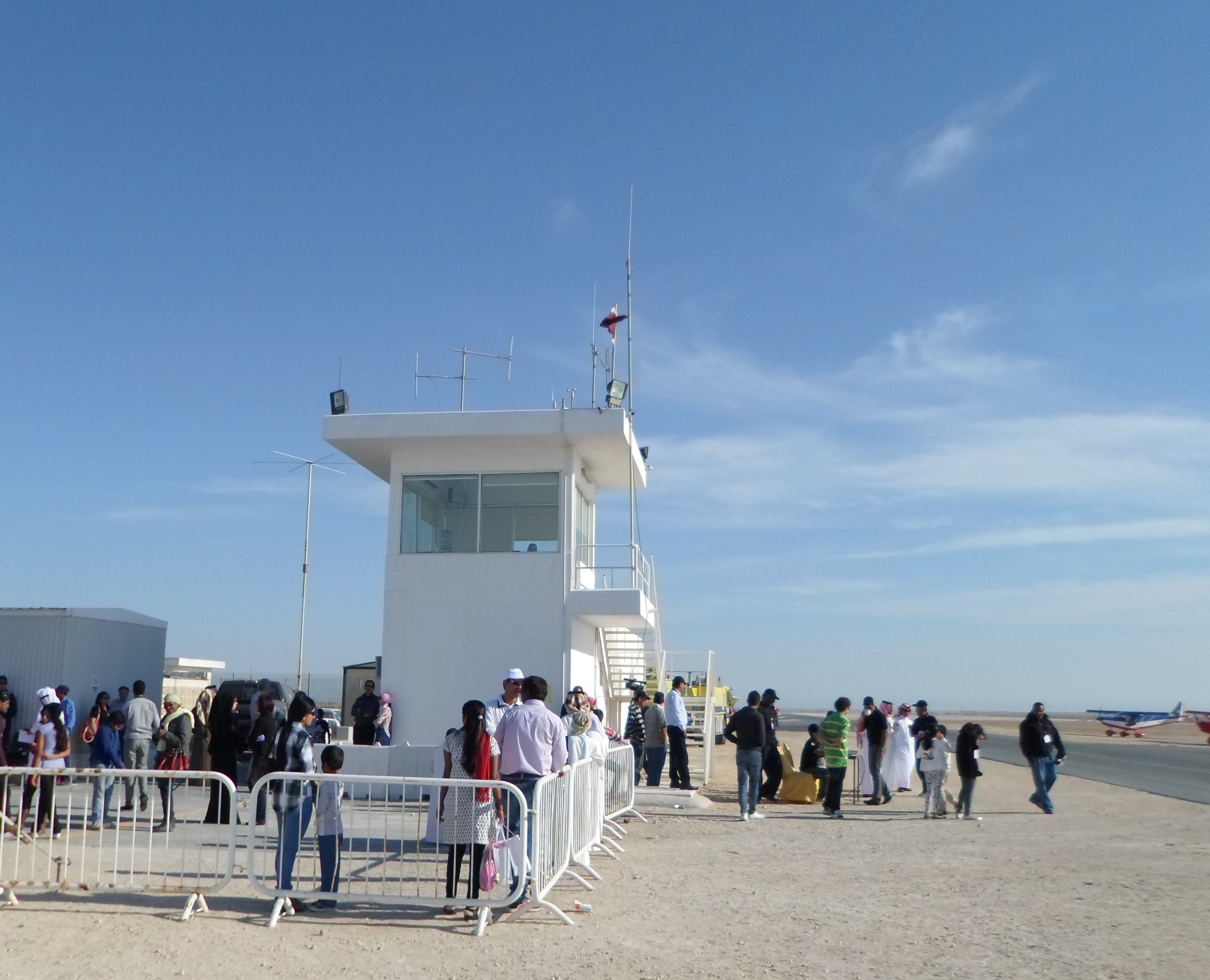
- IATA: none; ICAO: OTBK

Summary
- Airport type: Public
- Operator: Qatar Civil Aviation Authority
- Location: Al Khor, Qatar
- Elevation AMSL: 6 ft / 2 m
- Coordinates: 25°37′46″N 51°30′24″E

Map
- Location of airport in Qatar Al Khor Airport (Middle East) Al Khor Airport (Asia)

Runways
| Direction | Length | | Surface |
| Direction | m | ft | Surface |
|---|---|---|---|
| 14/32 | 1,600 | 5,249 | Asphalt |
- Source: DAFIF

Al Khor Airport (ICAO: OTBK) is located South of Al Khor in Qatar. The airport is mostly used by general aviation aircraft and has served as the venue of the annual Al Khor Fly-In since 2008. The fly-in lasts for two days and allows visitors to travel in and view aircraft. Aircraft from other GCC countries are showcased at the event. There are two aprons available with a PCN of 45. The northern apron is able to accommodate six aircraft like Cessna 172s and the southern apron is able to accommodate two similar aircraft.

The airport was removed from the Qatar AIP in the AIRAC amendment 08/19 effective on August 15, 2019. As of September 2021, it seems that the airport is closed. On Google Earth there are large crosses visible on the runway, indicating that the runway is not in use. It also seems that the runway is exactly aligned to the new Al Bayt Stadium near the north-west of the airport.

== See also ==
- Transport in Qatar
- List of airports in Qatar
