= Farra =

Farra may refer to:

== Astronomy ==
- 7501 Farra, an asteroid orbiting in the outer asteroid belt
- Farra (Venus), flat-topped volcanic features of the planet Venus

== Geography ==
- Farra, County Armagh, a townland in County Armagh, Northern Ireland
- Farra, an Italian civil parish of Mel, Veneto
- Farra d'Alpago, an Italian municipality of the Province of Belluno, Veneto
- Farra di Soligo, an Italian municipality of the Province of Treviso, Veneto
- Farra d'Isonzo, an Italian municipality of the Province of Gorizia, Friuli-Venezia Giulia

== Other uses ==
- Farra N. Hyte, Miss Continental Plus 2013

== See also ==
- Fara (disambiguation)
- Farah (disambiguation)
