= Fara =

Fara may refer to:

== Places ==
=== Italy ===
- Fara Gera d'Adda, Bergamo, Lombardy
- Fara Filiorum Petri, Chieti, Abruzzo
- Fara San Martino, Chieti, Abruzzo
- Fara in Sabina, Rieti, Lazio
- Fara Novarese, Novara, Piedmont
- Fara Olivana con Sola, Bergamo, Lombardy
- Fara Vicentino, Vicenza, Veneto

=== Rest of Europe ===
- Fara, Orkney, Scotland
- Fara, Bloke, Slovenia
- Fara, Kostel, Slovenia
- Fara, located in the Municipality of Prevalje, Slovenia

=== Rest of World ===
- Fara, Safad, Israel
- Fara, Burkina Faso
- Shuruppak or Fara, an ancient city in Sumeria
- Al Hashimiyya, Jordan; former name of this place

== People ==
- Fara (surname)

== Other ==
- Fellow of the Archives and Records Association (FARA)
- Future Attack Reconnaissance Aircraft
- Friedreich's Ataxia Research Alliance
- Fara (film), a 1999 Russian film
- Fara Rotuman Christmas festival
- FARA 83, an Argentine assault rifle
- Foreign Agents Registration Act
- Saint Fara
- Forum for Agricultural Research in Africa
- Future Attack Reconnaissance Aircraft, a cancelled United States Army helicopter program.

== See also ==
- Farra (disambiguation)
- Farah (disambiguation)
- Faras (disambiguation)
