= Zone 74, Qatar =

Zone 74
- Zone
- Interactive map of Zone 74
- Coordinates: 25.654010°N 51.356090°E
- Country: Qatar
- Municipality: Al Khor
- Blocks: 288

Area
  - Total: 373.9 km^{2} (144.4 sq mi)

Population
  - Total: 96,169 (2,015)
- Time zone: UTC+03 (Arabia Standard Time)
- ISO 3166 code: QA-KH

Zone 74 is a zone of the municipality of Al Khor in the state of Qatar. The main districts recorded in the 2015 population census were Simaisma, Al Jeryan, Al Khor City.

Other districts which fall within its administrative boundaries are Al Egda, Al Heedan, Al Khor Industrial Area, Al Khor Island, Al Rashida, Ras Matbakh, Rawdat Bakheela, and Umm Anaig.

== Demographics ==
Year	Population
1986	6,407
1997	9,803
2004	20,280
2010	60,575
2015	96,169

== Land use ==
The Ministry of Municipality and Environment (MME) breaks down land use in the zone as follows.

Area (km^{2})	Developed land (km^{2})	Undeveloped land (km^{2})	Residential (km^{2})	Commercial/ Industrial (km^{2})	Education/ Health (km^{2})	Farming/ Green areas (km^{2})	Other uses (km^{2})
373.89	90.21	283.68	6.69	0.86	0.69	53.79	28.18
