= Farah =

Farah may refer to:

- Farah (name), an Arabic female given name
  - Farah (actress), an Indian actress
  - empress Farah, Iranian empress
- Farah, Afghanistan, a city in western Afghanistan on the Farah River
- Farah, Mathura, a town in Mathura district, Uttar Pradesh, India
- Farah Province, Afghanistan
- Farah River, a river in western Afghanistan

== See also ==
- Farha, alternative form of the given name
- Fara (disambiguation)
- Farra (disambiguation)
