= Seashore Group =

- Company type: Limited liability company
- Founded: 1989
- Founder: Saeed Al-Mohannadi (Chairman); Muhamed Ali Saithukunj (MD)
- Area served: Qatar; India
- Website: Official website

Seashore Group is a Qatari-owned company and one of the largest multidisciplined business enterprises in the State of Qatar. Headquartered in Al Khor, the company was founded in 1989 by a Qatari businessman from Al Khor city Mr Saeed Al-Mohannadi in support with an Indian businessman Mr Mohamed Ali from Thrissur with an initial employee base of three workers. As of 2022, the company had 2,500 workers.
