= Faraz =

Faraz is a masculine given name and surname of Persian origin and means "elevation". It is inherited from Middle Persian [Book Pahlavi needed] (prʾc), 𐫜𐫡𐫀𐫝. Notable people with the name include:

== Given name ==
- Faraz Ahmed (born 1984), Pakistani first-class cricketer
- Faraz Akram (born 1993), Zimbabwean cricketer
- Faraz Ali (born 1993), Pakistani first-class cricketer
- Faraz Anwar (born 1977), Pakistani Progressive metal guitarist, both solo and in the band Mizraab
- Faraz Dero (born 1980), Pakistani Provincial Minister of Sindh for Auqaf, Religious Affairs, and Zakat and Ushr
- Faraz Emamali (born 1995), Iranian football forward
- Faraz Fatemi (born 1977), Iranian footballer
- Faraz Fatmi (born 1982), Indian politician belonging to Janata Dal (United)
- Faraz Jaka (born 1985), American professional poker player and businessman
- Faraz Javed (born 1984), television journalist, presenter, and producer in the US and United Arab Emirates
- Faraz Kamalvand (born 1976), Iranian football coach
- Faraz Khan (born 1993), American professional squash player
- Faraz Rabbani (born 1974), scholar and researcher of Islamic law and translator from Arabic to English
- Faraz Waqar (born 1976), Pakistani filmmaker, writer and film director

== Surname ==
- Ahmed Faraz (1931–2008), Urdu poet
- Mostafa Mousavi Faraz (born 1944), Iranian Twelver Shia ayatollah
- Shibli Faraz, Pakistani politician, Minister of Science and Technology

== See also ==
- Shirin Faraz F.C., an Iranian football club based in Kermanshah, Iran
- Faraaz
