= Al Heedan =

Al Heedan الحيضان
- Village
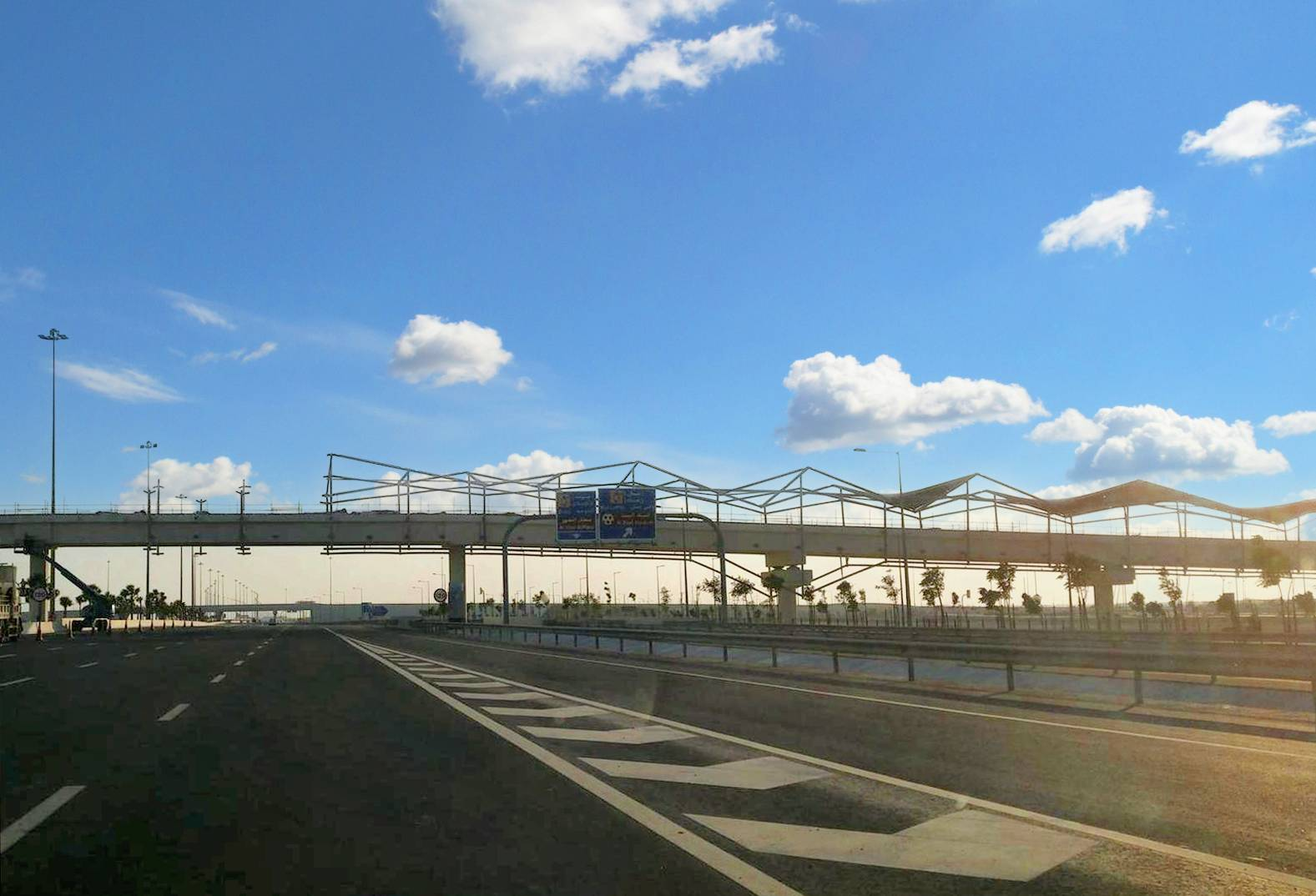
- Al Khor Coastal Road in Al Heedan.

- Location in Qatar
- Coordinates: 25°38′40.7″N 51°28′13.7″E
- Country: Qatar
- Municipality: Al Khor
- Zone: Zone 74
- District no.: 276

Area
  - Total: 2.7 sq mi (6.9 km^{2})

Al Heedan (Arabic: الحيضان; also spelled Al Hidan and Al Haydan) is a village in Qatar located in the municipality of Al Khor. It is situated on the outskirts of Al Khor City, the municipal seat, and is considered a district of the city. Parts of its territory fall under Al Daayen Municipality.

== Etymology ==
Similar to most other place names in Qatar, Al Heedan derives its name from its geographic features. Heedan is Arabic for "water reservoir", being so named because its area consists of three adjacent rawdas (depressions) which retain water for long periods of time.

== History ==
J.G. Lorimer's Gazetteer of the Persian Gulf (1908) has an entry for Al Heedan, referring to it as "Al Hadhan". He lists its location as 7 miles south-west of Khor Shaqiq and 6 miles east from the coast. Few details are offered of it, except that it is a camping ground for Bedouins and has an unlined well which yields good water at 7 fathoms.

== Infrastructure ==
As part of the Qatar Power Transmission System Expansion project, in 2015 it was announced that a power substation would be created in Al Heedan in order to power Al Bayt Stadium. In July 2018, the substation was fully commissioned after being constructed at a cost of QR 138 million.

Al Khor's municipal council allocated 1,000 plots of land in Al Heedan to be developed as housing units for residents of Al Khor City in 2017.
