= Faraaz =

Faraaz is a masculine given name. Notable people with the name include:

- Faraaz Ayaaz Hossain (1996–2016), Bangladeshi crime victim
- Faraaz Khan (born 1974), Indian film actor

== Arts and entertainment ==
- Faraaz (2022 film), a Hindi film on actual event

== See also ==
- Faraz
