= Rawdat Al Faras =

Rawdat Al Faras روضة الفرس
- District
- Location in Qatar
- Coordinates: 25.82191°N 51.33107°E
- Country: Qatar
- Municipality: Al Khor
- Zone: Zone 76
- District no.: 178

Area
  - Total: 3.2 sq mi (8.2 km^{2})

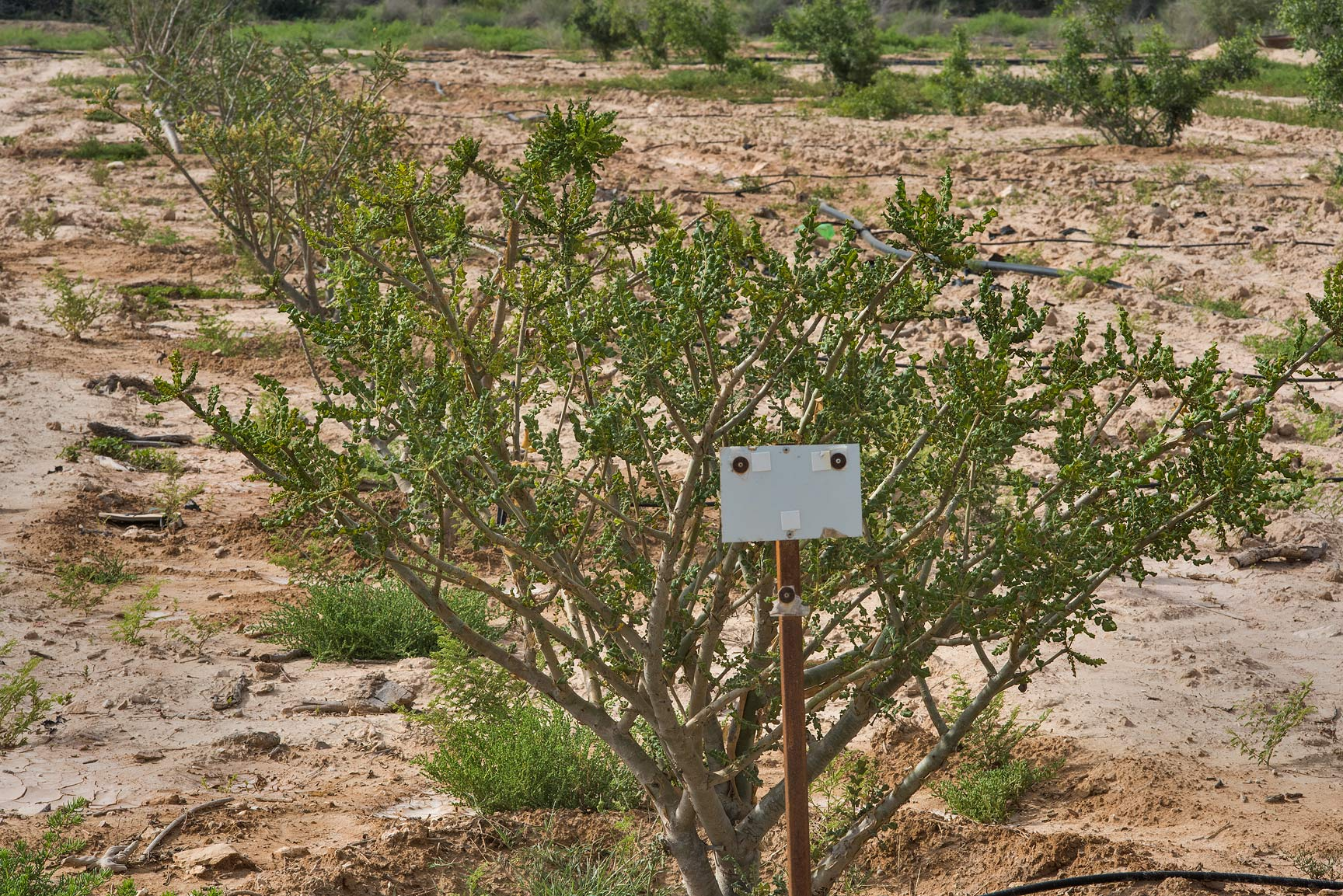
Inside view of Rawdat Al Faras Research Station.

Rawdat Al Faras (Arabic: روضة الفرس) is a district in Qatar located in the municipality of Al Khor. It is best known for its research station.

== Etymology ==
In Arabic, rawda is a term used to denote a depression rich in vegetation due to water and sediment run-off. The second part of the name, faras, translates to "mare", and was given because a wild mare was once found in the area.

== Geography ==
Rawdat Al Faras is situated in north-central Qatar. It forms the southernmost extension of the middle sector of Qatar's interior plain region. The area around Rawdat Al Faras, as part of this middle sector, has a surface that gradually increases in elevation from north and east towards the south and west, with heights ranging between 11 metres (36 ft) to 21 metres (69 ft).

== Houbara Breeding Center ==
A breeding center for houbara bustards is centered in the district. It received a donation of 1,065 houbaras from a UAE government-funded organization in 2014.

== Wild Animals Containment Center ==
The Ministry of Municipality and Environment (MME) established the Wild Animals Containment Center in Rawdat Al Faras as a permanent shelter for stray dogs and cats. The government launched Rifq (translating to mercy) campaign in 2021 to catch and house all of the wild animals in this center. Authorities have been accused of rounding up dogs from humane shelters and forcefully relocating them to the center.

== Research station ==
Established in 1976, Rawdat Al Faras Research Station is among the oldest research stations in the country. It occupies an area of 517,000 square meters. Activities engaged in at the center include consultation services for local farms, date palm research, field surveys of local fauna, and selling and donating palm tree seeds and seedlings. The station consists of a water reservoir and two specialized facilities that dry the palm trees, extract their pollen and provide storage for their dried fruit. There 24 growing plots, of which five are palm tree plantations, two of which host over 1,200 specimens. In recent years, the station has been focused on its development of a palm atlas, which will serve as a genetic database for researchers across the GCC.

== Zoo ==
It was reported in 2018 that a zoo would be opening in Rawdat Al Faras in the near future. Its specimens will be transferred from Al Khor Zoo.
