= Al Khor =

Municipality in Qatar

Al Khor and Al Thakhira الخور والذخيرة (Arabic)
- Municipality
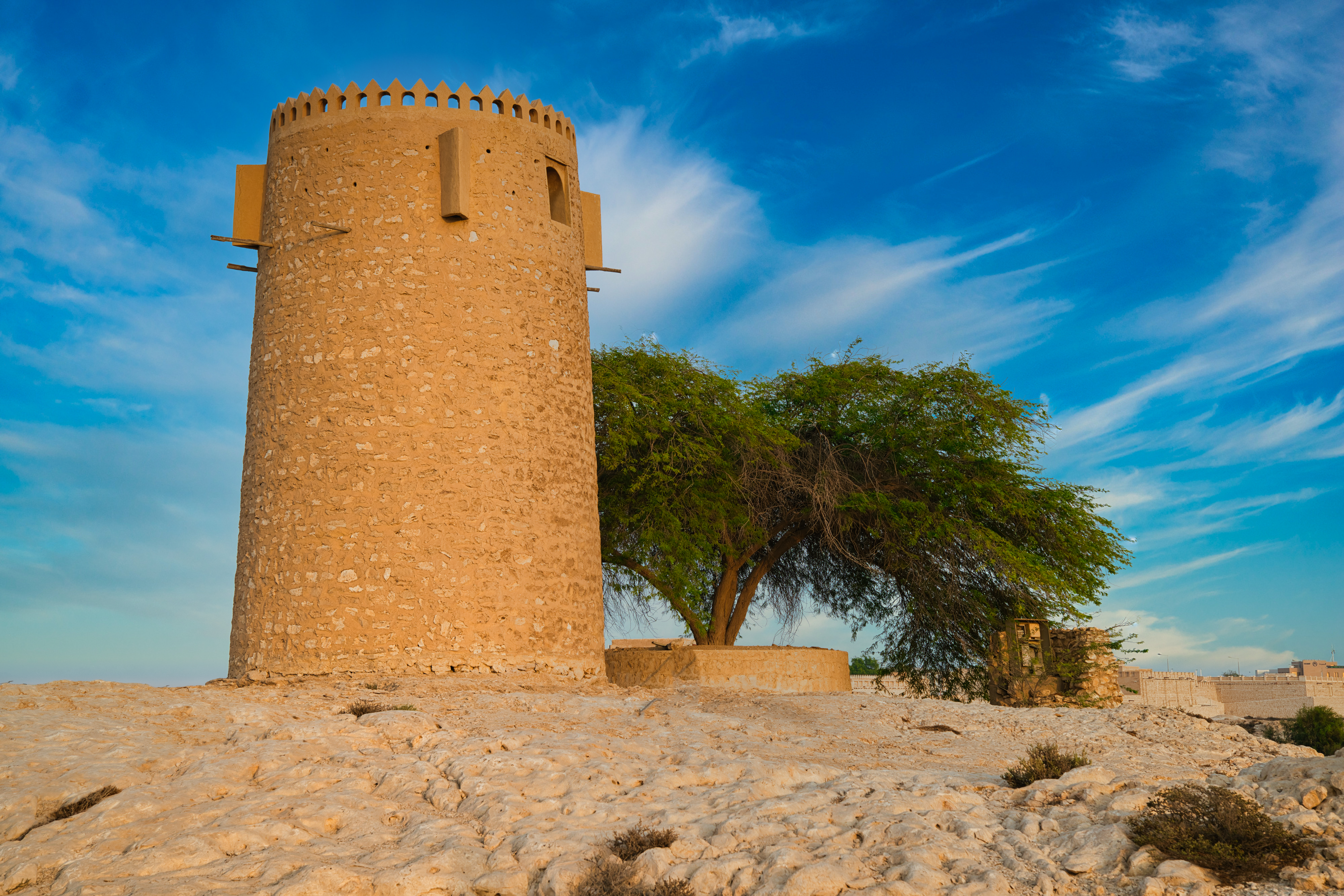
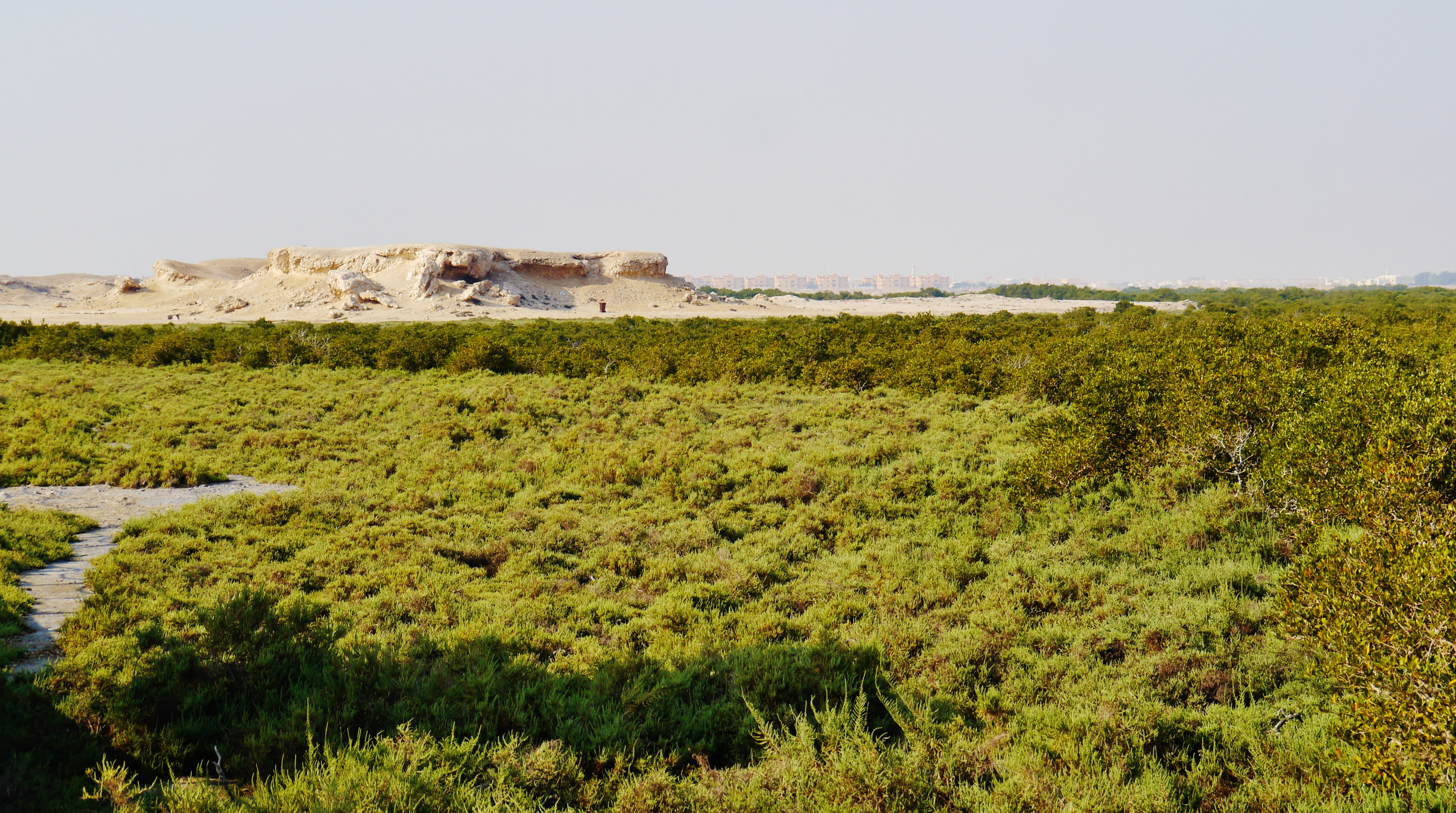
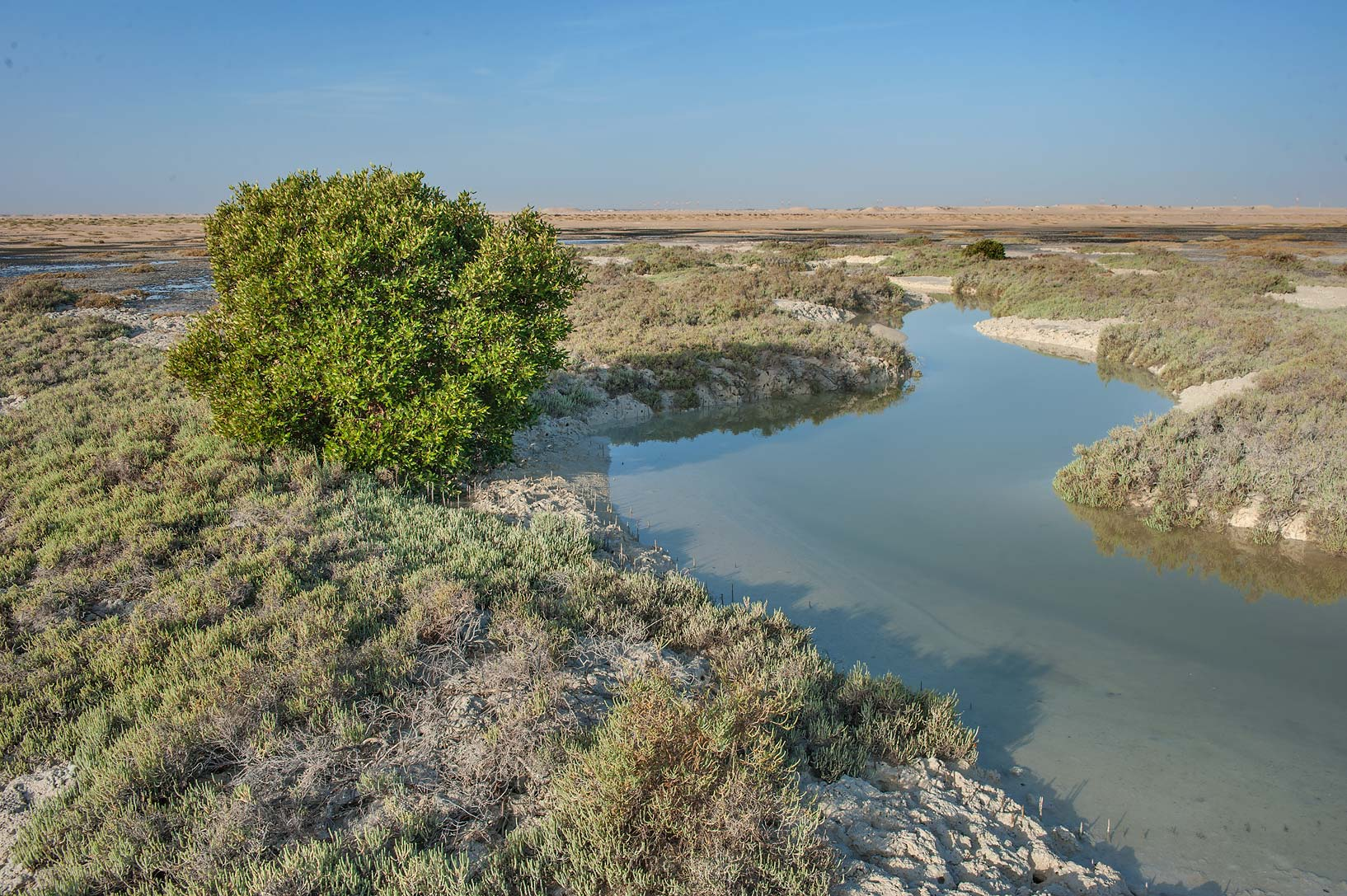
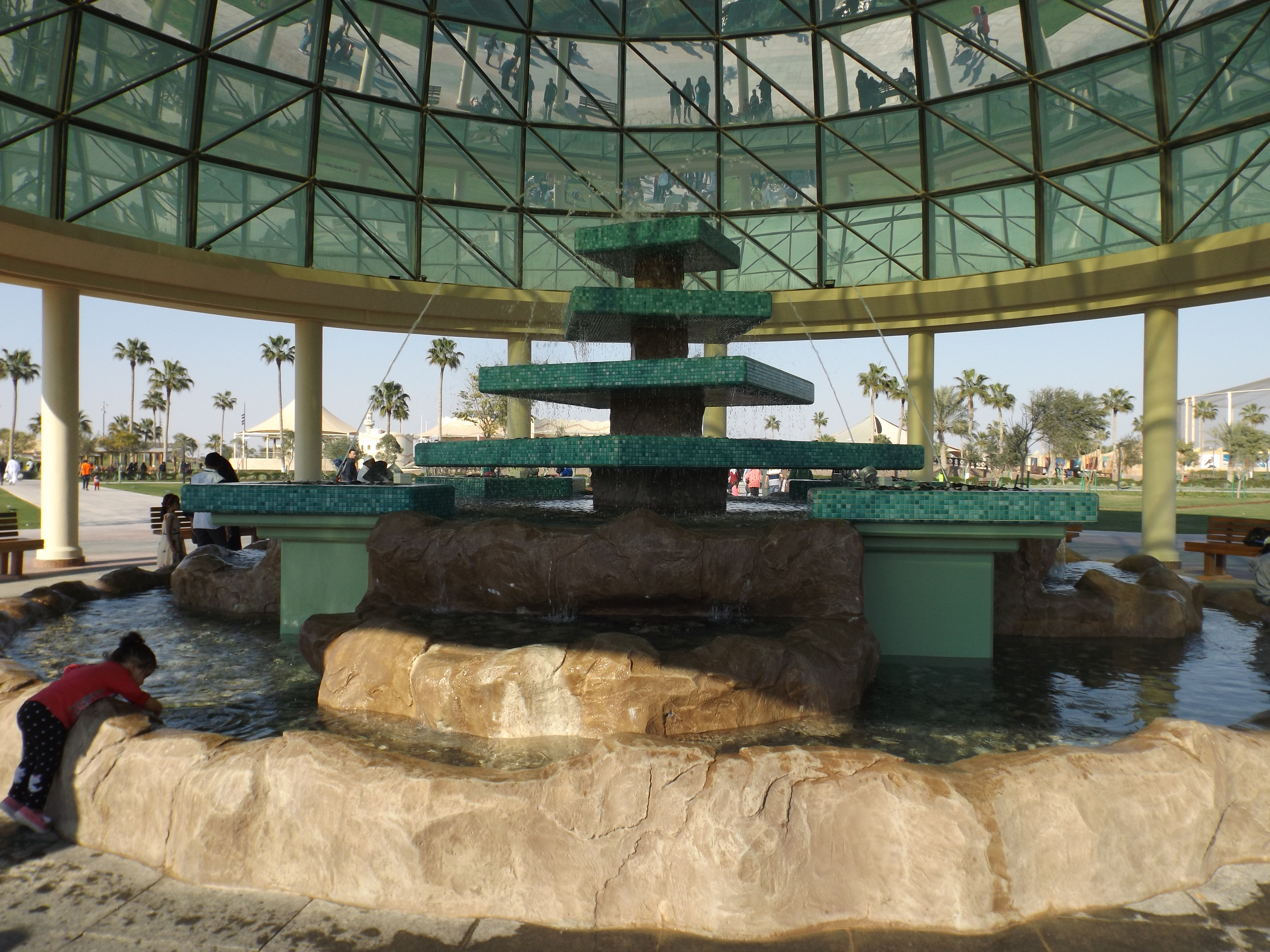
- One of the three Al Khor Towers Al Khor Island (Purple Island) Salt marsh in Al Thakhira Al Bayt Stadium Al Khor Park
- Interactive map of Al Khor and Al Thakhira
- Coordinates: 25.8°N 51.4°E
- Country: Qatar
- Capital: Al Khor City
- Zones: 3

Government
  - Mayor: Ibrahim Issa Nasser Al Fadalah

Area
  - Total: 1,613.3 km^{2} (622.9 sq mi)

Population (2015)
  - Total: 202,031
  - Density: 125.23/km^{2} (324.34/sq mi)
- Time zone: UTC+03 (Arabia Standard Time)
- ISO 3166 code: QA-KH

Al Khor (Arabic: الخور; also spelled Al Khawr), officially Al Khor and Al Thakhira, is a municipality in northeastern Qatar. Al Khor, the municipal seat, is located on the northeast coast of Qatar, around 50 kilometres (31 miles) from the capital, Doha and is considered to be one of Qatar's major cities. Al Thakhira is the second most significant settlement in the municipality after Al Khor City.

The region was ruled by the Al Muhannadi tribe, which consists of seven Bedouin families, before Qatar gained its independence in 1971. Tourism has been increasing in recent years owing to the municipality's various resorts, natural areas and cultural attractions. Fishing was the historical mainstay of most of the municipality's inhabitants.

== Etymology ==
Al Khor Municipality derives its name from the city of the same name. In Arabic, Al Khawr means "bay"; it was so named because Al Khor City was near a bay. Formerly, the city was known as "Khor Al-Shaqiq".

== History ==
Al Khor Municipality was established in July 1972, alongside Qatar's four other initial municipalities, and supervises the city of Al Khor in addition to other settlements in the municipality. As of 2017, Ibrahim Issa Nasser Al Fadalah was the mayor of the municipality.

== Municipal seat ==
Al Khor City, the municipal seat, is a coastal city located 57 kilometres (35 miles) north of the capital Doha. In the past, it was well known for the role it played in Qatar's bustling pearling industry, as well as for its harbour which is filled with fishing boats and small crafts. Several beaches, renovated forts and cultural attractions are found in the city.

== Geography ==
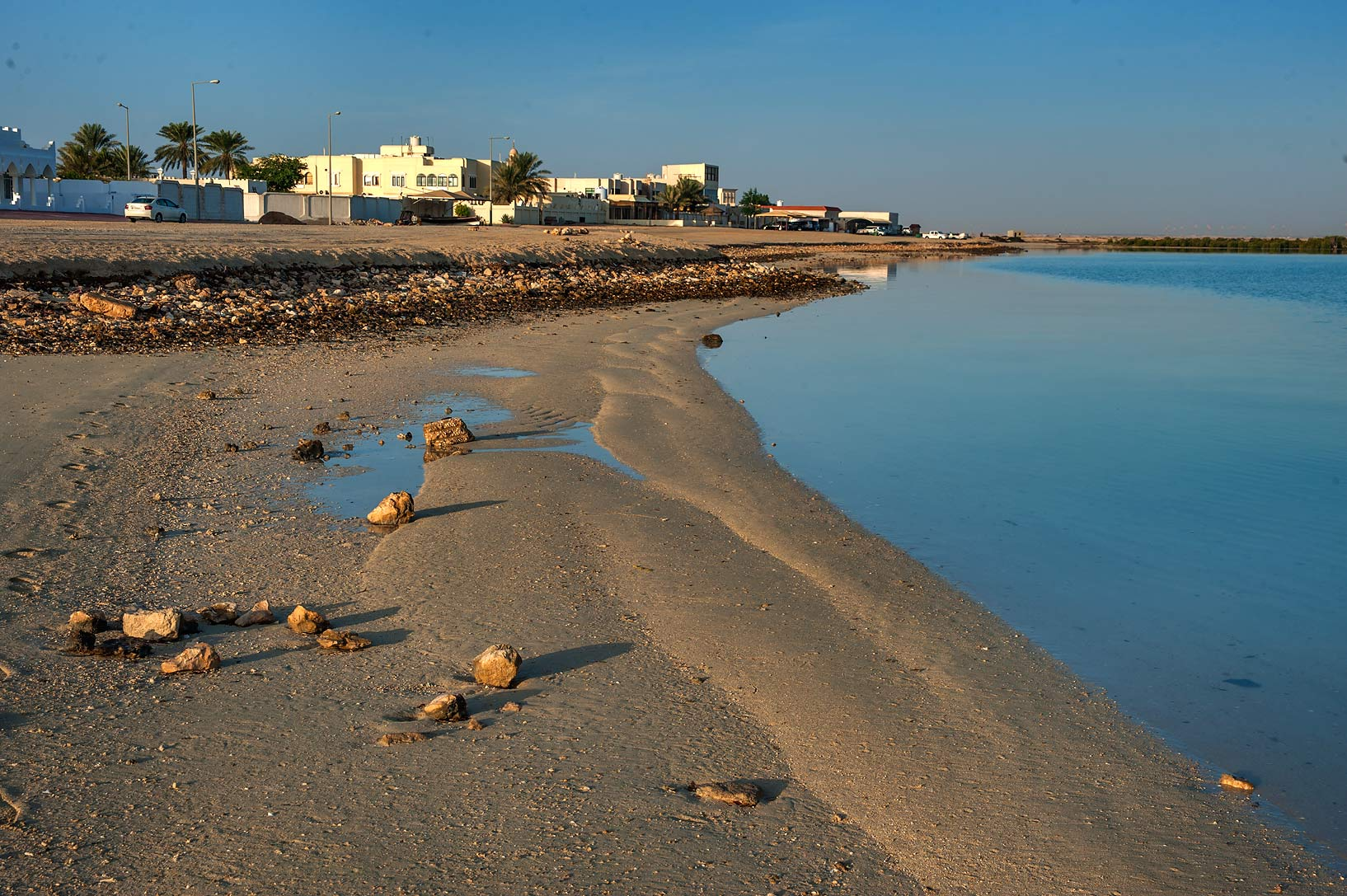
Beach in Al Thakhira

Al Khor is situated in northern Qatar, bordered by the municipalities of Al Shamal to the north, Al Daayen and Umm Salal to the southeast, and Al-Shahaniya to the southwest. In addition to the main municipal headquarters in Al Khor City, there are Ministry of Municipality and Environment branches in Al Thakhira and Al Ghuwariyah.

Much of Al Khor's territory lies along the Qatari Peninsula's eastern coast, including the eastern boundaries of the municipality's two main cities – Al Khor City and Al Thakhira. Numerous beaches are located in this area, including Al-Farka Beach in Al Khor City and Al Thakhira Beach. A seafront promenade stretched over a 28,000-square-metre (300,000 sq ft) area known as Al Khor Corniche runs through the municipal seat.

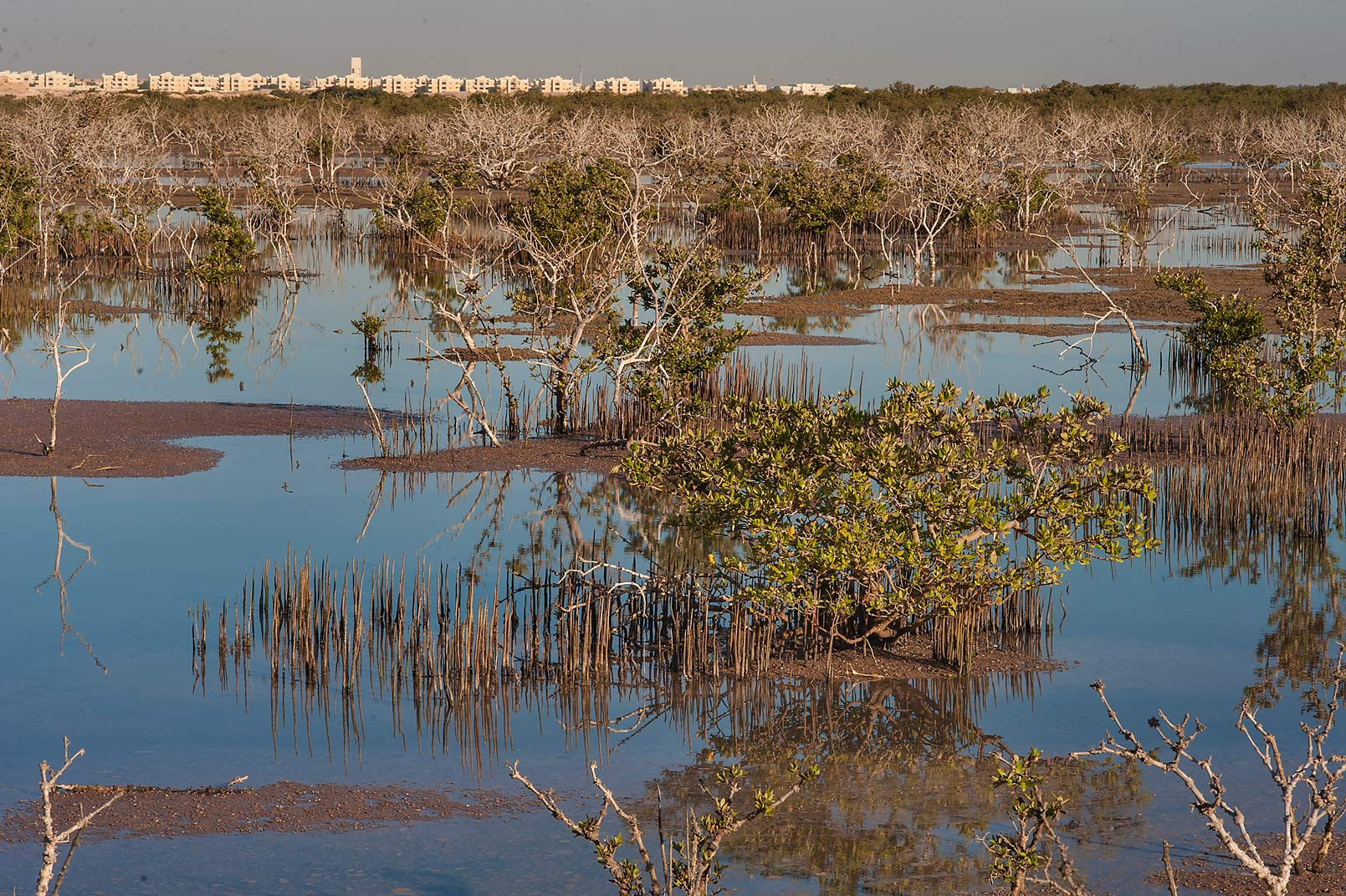
Mangroves (Avicennia marina) in Al Khor Island overlooking the mainland

According to the Ministry of Municipality and Environment, the municipality accommodates 170 rawdas, 49 wadis, 57 jeris (places where water flows), seven jeryan (multiple jeris), seven plains, 22 hills, five highlands, 13 sabkhas, 17 capes, four bays, and three coral reefs. Four islands are found off its shores, the most important of which is Al Khor Island (also known as Jazirat Bin Ghanim).

White mangrove forests in Qatar can be found in greatest abundance near Al Khor and Al Thakhira. This species of mangroves is well-adapted to the saline conditions of the northeast coast. At least eight mangrove sites exist in Qatar, and all are protected areas as of a 2006 Emiri decree.

=== Climate ===
The following is climate data for the municipal seat, Al Khor.

Climate data for Al Khor City
Month	Jan	Feb	Mar	Apr	May	Jun	Jul	Aug	Sep	Oct	Nov	Dec	Year
Mean daily maximum °C (°F)	20.5 (68.9)	22.5 (72.5)	27 (81)	32.5 (90.5)	39 (102)	41.5 (106.7)	42 (108)	40.5 (104.9)	39 (102)	35 (95)	29 (84)	23 (73)	32.6 (90.7)
Mean daily minimum °C (°F)	12 (54)	13.5 (56.3)	16 (61)	21 (70)	25 (77)	26.5 (79.7)	28.5 (83.3)	27.5 (81.5)	26 (79)	23.5 (74.3)	20 (68)	14 (57)	21.1 (70.1)
Average precipitation mm (inches)	11 (0.4)	1.5 (0.06)	2 (0.1)	6.5 (0.26)	1 (0.0)	0 (0)	0 (0)	0 (0)	0 (0)	0.25 (0.01)	13.5 (0.53)	22 (0.9)	57.75 (2.26)
Average relative humidity (%)	61	60	56	53	49	50	51	57	60	63	69	74	59
Source: Qatar Statistics Authority

== Administration ==
The municipality is divided into 3 zones which are then divided into 454 blocks. Two of its main districts, Simaisma and Al Jeryan, are geographically located in Al Daayen. Additionally, the village of Madinat Al Kaaban is geographically located in Al Khor but serves as an administrative district for Al Shamal.

=== Administrative zones ===
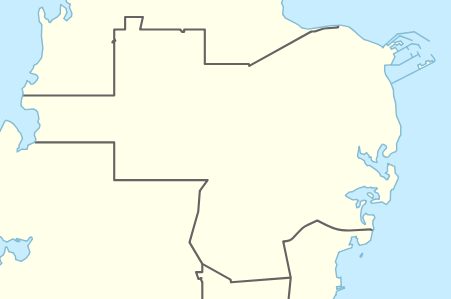
Approximate locations of the main districts in Al Khor.

The following administrative zones are found in Al Khor Municipality as of 2015:

Zone no.	Census districts	Area (km^{2})	Population (2015)
74	Simaisma; Al Jeryan; Al Khor City	373.9	96,169
75	Al Thakhira; Ras Laffan; Umm Birka	610.8	100,118
76	Al Ghuwariyah	628.6	5,744
Municipality		1613.3	202,031

=== Districts ===
Other settlements in Al Khor include:

- Abu Al Qararis (Arabic: ابا القراريص)
- Al Egda (Arabic: العقدة)
- Al Heedan (Arabic: الحيضان)
- Al Khor Industrial Area (Arabic: صناعية الخور)
- Al Khor Island (Arabic: جزيرة الخور; also Jazirat bin Ghannam)
- Al Rashida (Arabic: رشيدة)
- Al Waab (Arabic: الوعب)
- Ras Matbakh (Arabic: راس مطبخ)
- Rawdat Al Faras (Arabic: روضة الفرس)
- Rawdat Bakheela (Arabic: روضة بخيلة)
- Umm Al Hawaya (Arabic: ام الحوايا)
- Umm Al Maa (Arabic: ام الماء)
- Umm Al Qahab (Arabic: ام القهاب)
- Umm Anaig (Arabic: ام عنيق)
- Umm Ethnaitain (Arabic: ام اثنيتين)
- Wadi Al Harm (Arabic: وادي الهرم)
- Waab Al Mashrab (Arabic: وعب المشرب)

== Education ==
There were 21 public schools in Al Khor as recorded in the 2016 education census – 11 were exclusively for girls and 10 were for boys. A higher number of students were female, at 2,192 compared to 1,703 male students.

The first school outside of Doha was opened in the city of Al Khor in 1952. Al Khor International School, located in Al Khor Community (also known as Umm Enaig), is one of the largest schools in the municipality, accommodating 4,000 students of families employed by QatarEnergy LNG.

Al-Khor and Al-Thakhira joined the UNESCO Global Network of Learning Cities in 2025.

== Healthcare ==
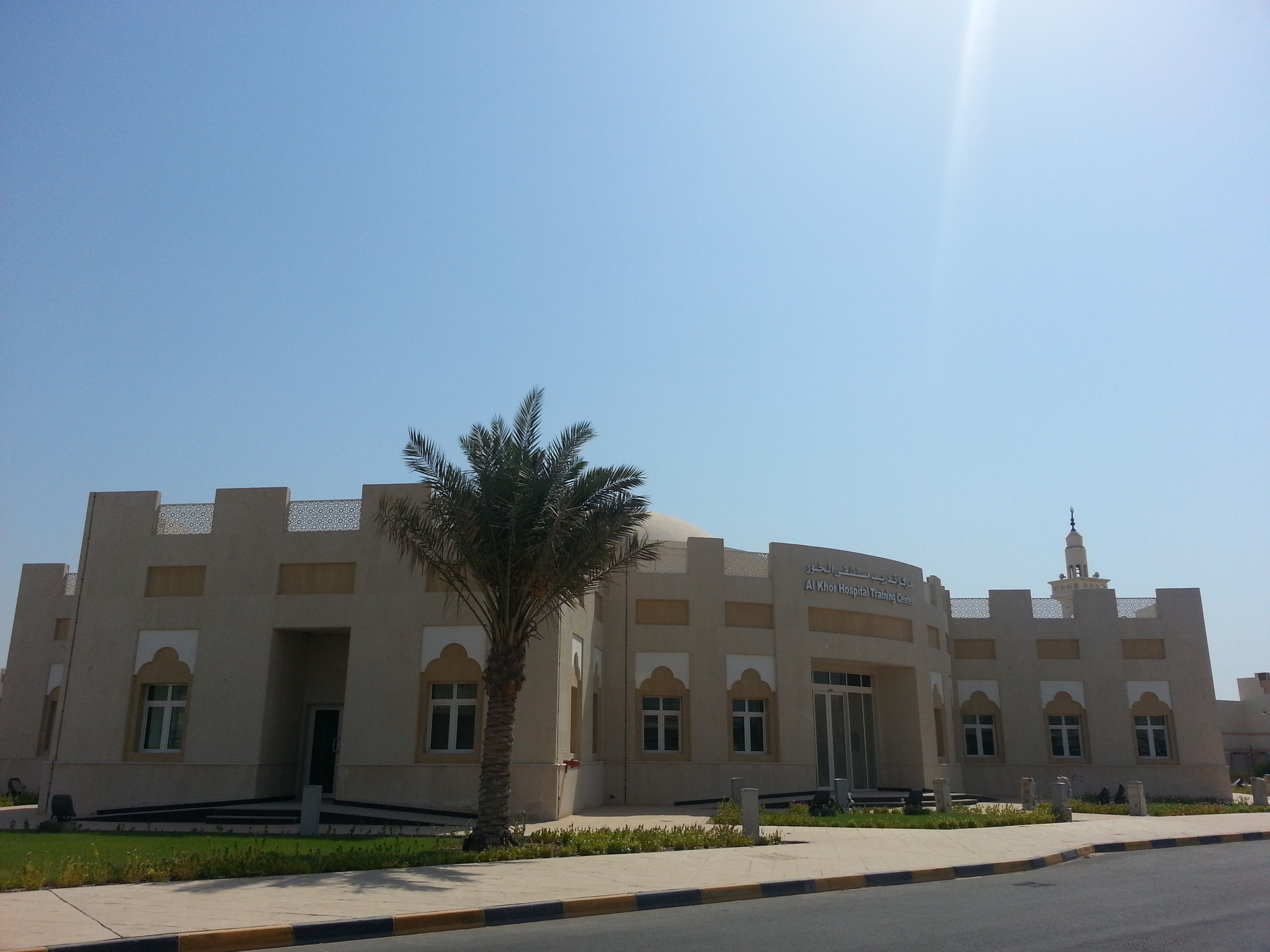
Al Khor Hospital Training Center

The 2015 government census indicated that there are 9 healthcare facilities registered in the municipality. Residents near Al Khor City are currently served by Al Khor General Hospital, which is under the auspices of Hamad Medical Corporation. It has a bed capacity of 115 and was opened in 2005. Health services provided by the hospital include general medical care, general surgery, obstetrics, pediatrics and neonatal care.

Eight pharmacies were recorded in the municipality in 2013 by Qatar's Supreme Council of Health.

== Culture ==
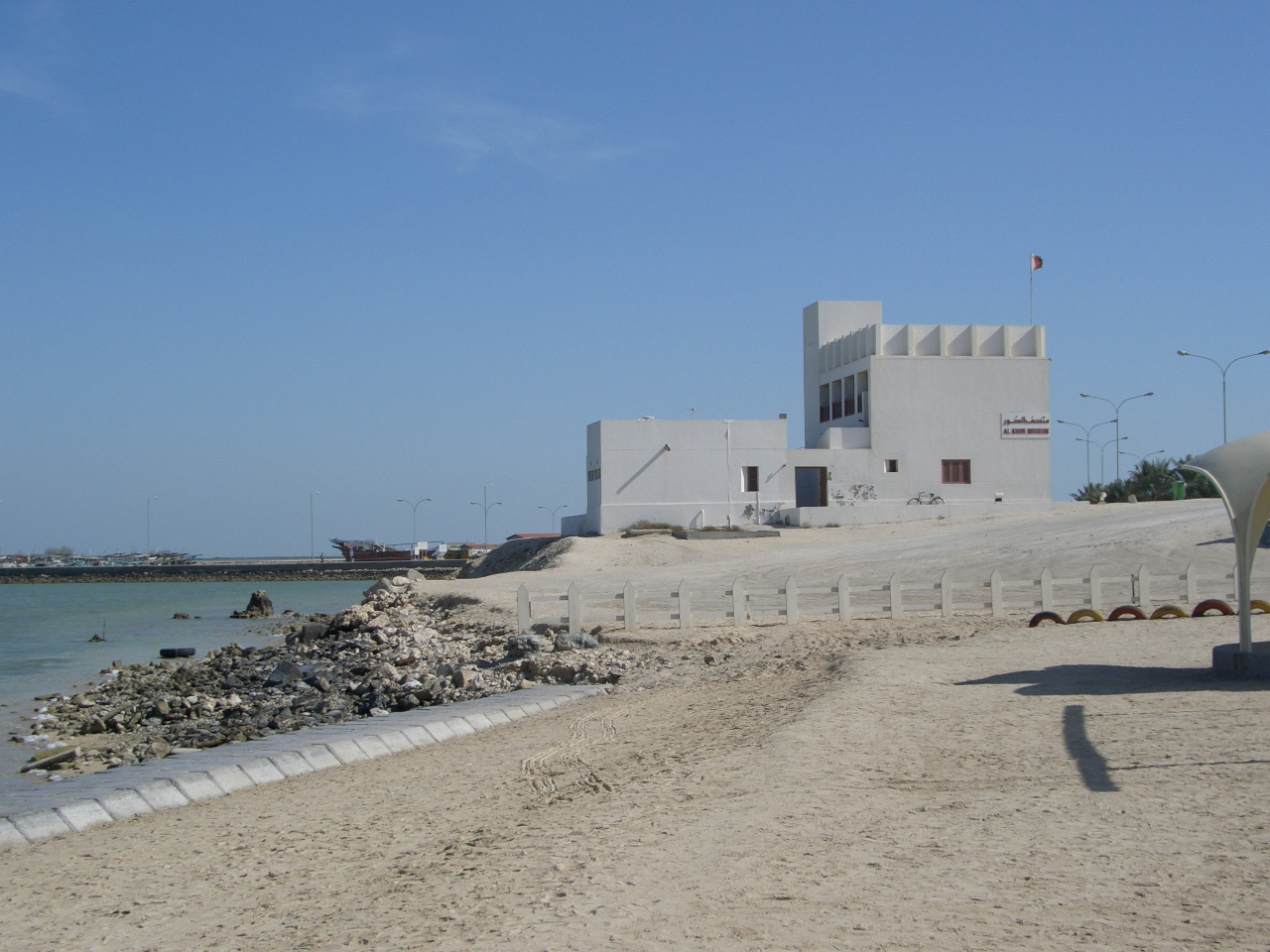
Al Khor Museum

The Al Khor Archaeological Museum, located in a former two-level police station on the coast of Al Khor City, houses artifacts collected from expeditions carried out in the municipality. On the ground floor of the museum, handiwork relating to Qatar's cultural heritage are on display, and there are exhibits on the maritime traditions historically engaged in by Qataris, such as fishing and shipbuilding. Ancient artifacts obtained from excavations, including those done on the dye industry in Al Khor Island, are hosted on the first floor, as well as geographic maps of Al Khor. On the second level, visitors are provided with a view of the bay and docks near the museum.

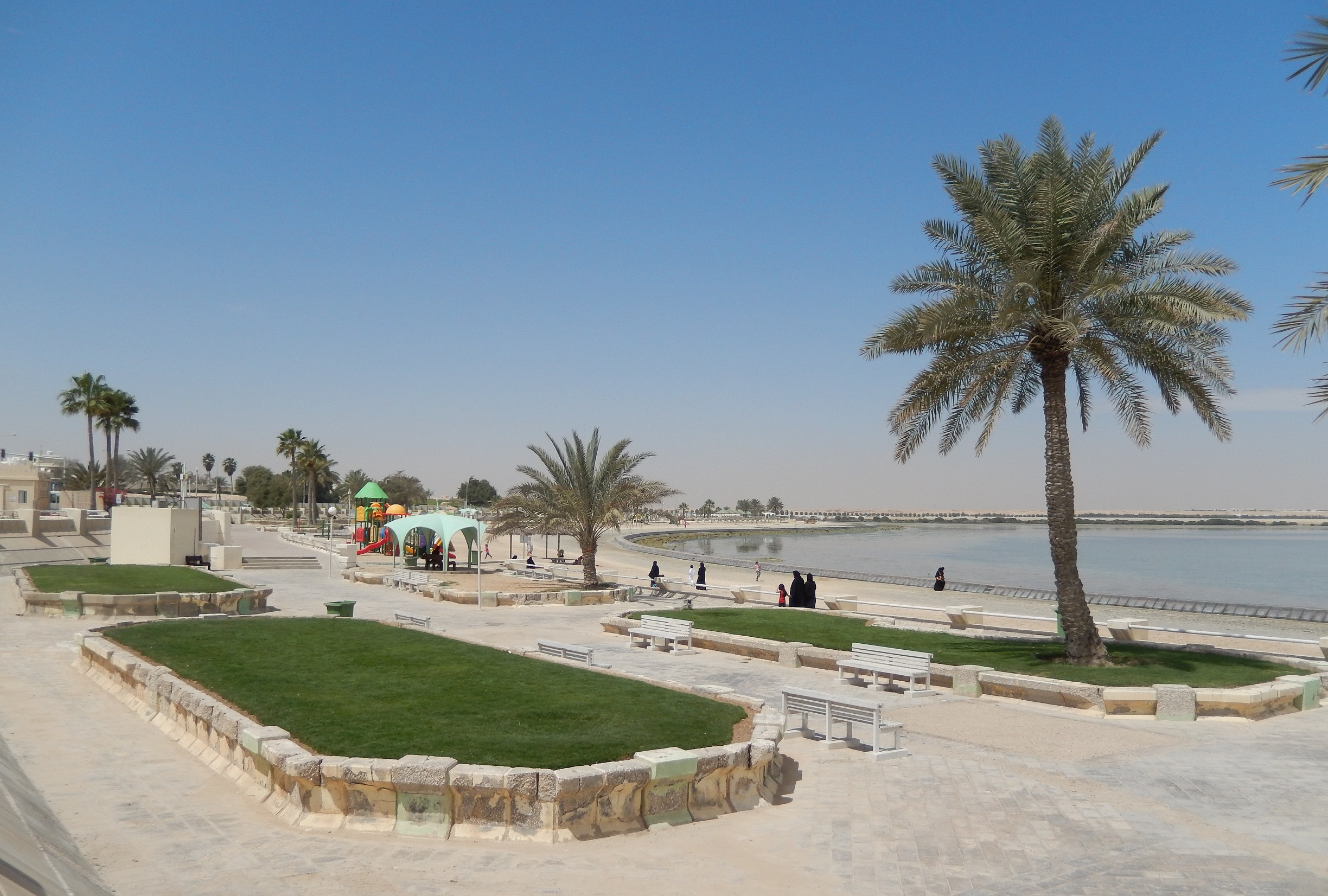
Al Khor City Corniche

Al-Khor SC is active in organizing social events through its cultural division, the Al Khor SC Social and Cultural Committee. A number of partnerships have been signed between the committee and local schools and organizations. The committee is responsible for organizing the Al-Khor SC's summer camps which include educational lectures and physical activities. Programs put into effect by the committee include the Midar Maritime Festival at Al Khor Port, the Phantom Jets Championship in January 2015 at Al Khor Airport, diving classes, and natural history tours of various archaeological sites in the country.

Al Khor Mall is an important cultural venue. It accommodates the first three cinemas to be constructed in the municipality, with a combined capacity of 600 viewers. Theatrical performances take place in the mall, as part of Qatar's annual Eid Al Fitr Festival.

== Economy ==
=== Natural gas ===
Natural gas was discovered off of Qatar's east coast in the 1970s, in an area that came to be known as the North Field. The north-east portion of the municipality, known as Ras Laffan, was converted to a natural gas processing center. At present, Ras Laffan accommodates the world's largest GTL plant, the Pearl GTL, which was constructed as a result of a partnership between Royal Dutch Shell and QatarEnergy. Qatar is also the world's second largest supplier of helium, which can be extracted from natural gas. All of the country's helium is produced by Qatargas' two helium plants in Ras Laffan, which were commissioned in 2005 and 2013, respectively. In June 2017, amidst the Qatar diplomatic crisis, the government ordered the two plants to be shut down indefinitely.

=== Agriculture ===
Agricultural activities such as fishing and pearling were traditional mainstays of the inhabitants of this region. Despite being overtaken in importance by the extraction and construction industries, agriculture is still one of the largest industries in Al Khor. Domestically, 35% of Qatar's total farmland was based in Al Khor in 2015, putting it just behind the municipality of Al Rayyan which had a 36% share of Qatar's farmland. Al Khor, however, had the highest density of farms. There were 344 farms spread out over 16,943 hectares, 220 of which were mixed operations, 119 were occupied solely by crops, and 3 reared livestock. The municipality had a livestock inventory of 160,675, the majority of which were sheep (109,337). Livestock numbers surpassed that of all other municipalities. Root vegetables such as carrots, potatoes, onions and fodder beets are some of the most important crops produced by Qatari farms, the latter of which is grown in large quantities at Al Dawoodiyah in Al Khor.

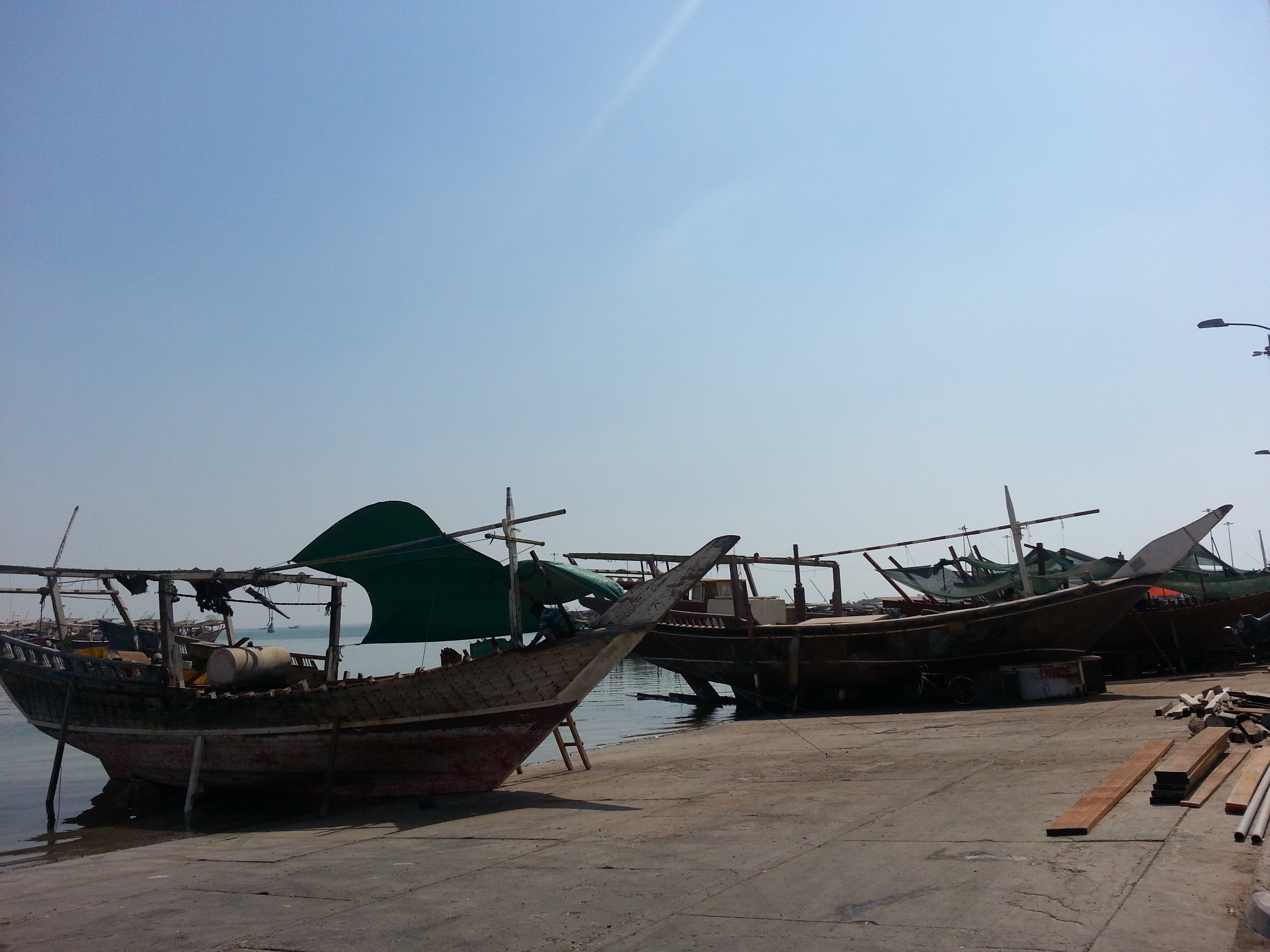
Fishing vessels in Al Khor City

In terms of artisanal fishing vessels, Al Khor had the highest amount out of any city surveyed in 2015 at 234 vessels. The city also had the most sailors (1,408) and was also the only major city to record an increase in the rate of sailors from 2010 to 2015.

After Qatar was embargoed by Saudi Arabia, the United Arab Emirates, Bahrain and Egypt in June 2017, it launched a project to fly 10,000 cows to Qatar to reach its goal of food self-sufficiency. This project is based on a two-million square meter plot owned by the Baladna agricultural company in the Umm Al Hawaya locality of the municipality.

One of the most important agricultural research stations in Qatar is located in Rawdat Al Faras. The research station, established in 1976, consists of a laboratory, a warehouse and five palm tree fields hosting thousands of palm trees.

Capitalizing on the municipality's rich maritime tradition, the 101,000-square-metre (1,090,000 sq ft) facility of the Aquatic Fisheries and Research Centre was completed in Ras Matbakh by Ashghal in 2017 at a cost of QR 237.7 million.

Three major government-owned plant nurseries are located in Al Khor; two are in the village of Al Rashida, and one is in Rawdat Bakheela. Plants grown in these nurseries are used for research and also distributed to government ministries. The nurseries in Al Rashida each span 2,500 square metres (27,000 sq ft) and were established in 2003. There is a farmers' market in Al Khor Yard.

== Housing ==
Al Khor's municipal council announced plans to open two workers' cities in the Abu Al Qararis area in 2016. These cities are planned to facilitate 45,000 inhabitants.

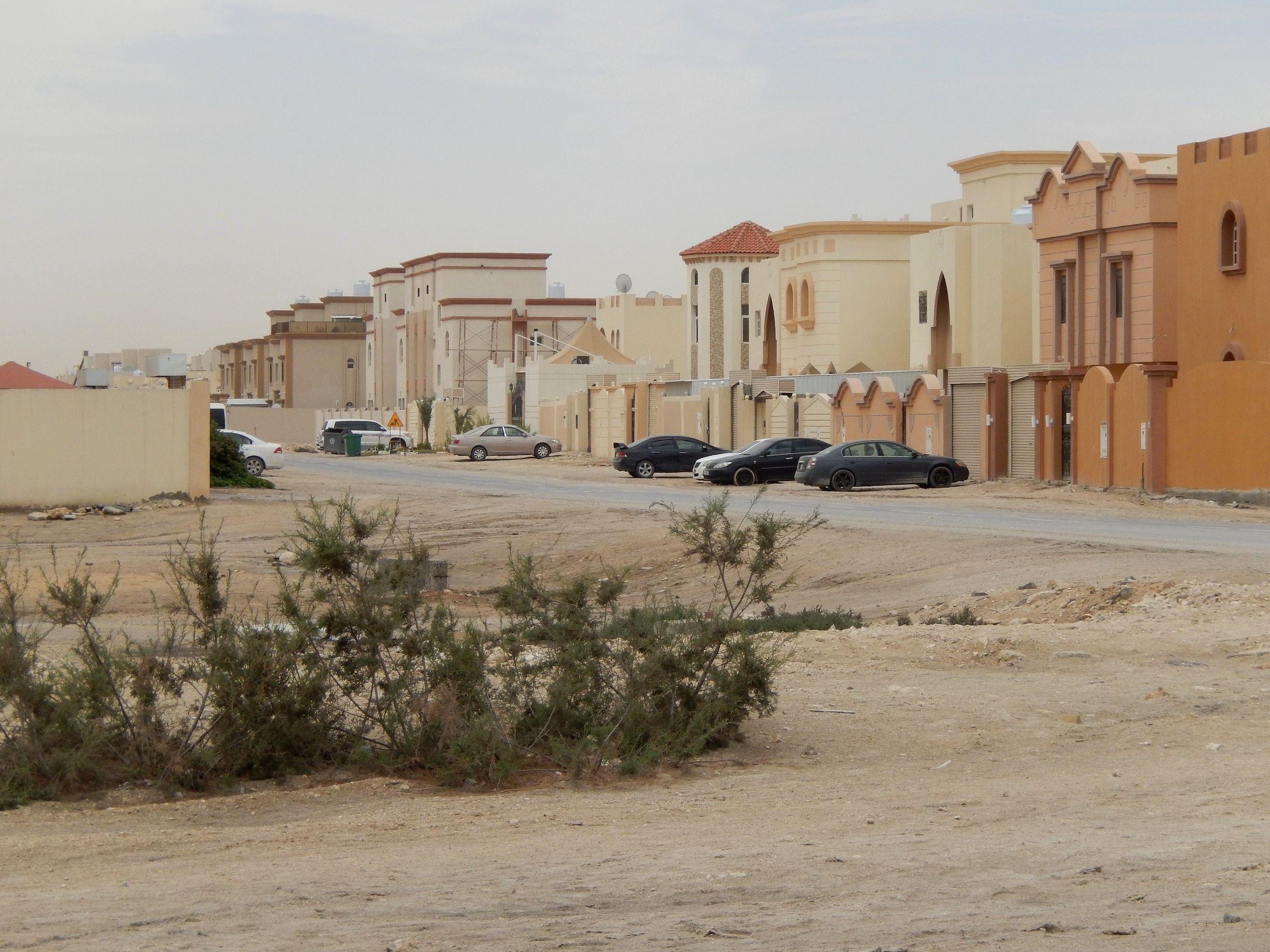
Neighborhood in Al Khor City

Barwa Group carries out real estate projects in Al Khor through its subsidiary, Barwa Al Khor. In November 2008, the group unveiled its major 'Urjuan' project, which had a projected cost of $10 billion. Located near the city of Al Khor, Urjuan was described as a planned city capable of hosting 63,000 inhabitants spread over 5.5 million square km. The project had a planned completion date of 2013 and its plots were to be sold through several phases. However, in December 2009, the project was indefinitely put on hold.

Shell Project, a real estate project featuring 350 housing units, a supermarket, and a mosque spanning an area of 138,000 square metres (1,490,000 sq ft), was completed by Barwa Al Khor in 2016 and its ownership transferred to Royal Dutch Shell.

Al Khor Community constitutes the biggest housing community in the country at about 15,000 residents. Located in Umm Enaig near Al Thakhira, it hosts 15,000 people and has well-developed infrastructure, including a medical center, five sports facilities, a library, schools, a skate park and playgrounds.

== Transport ==
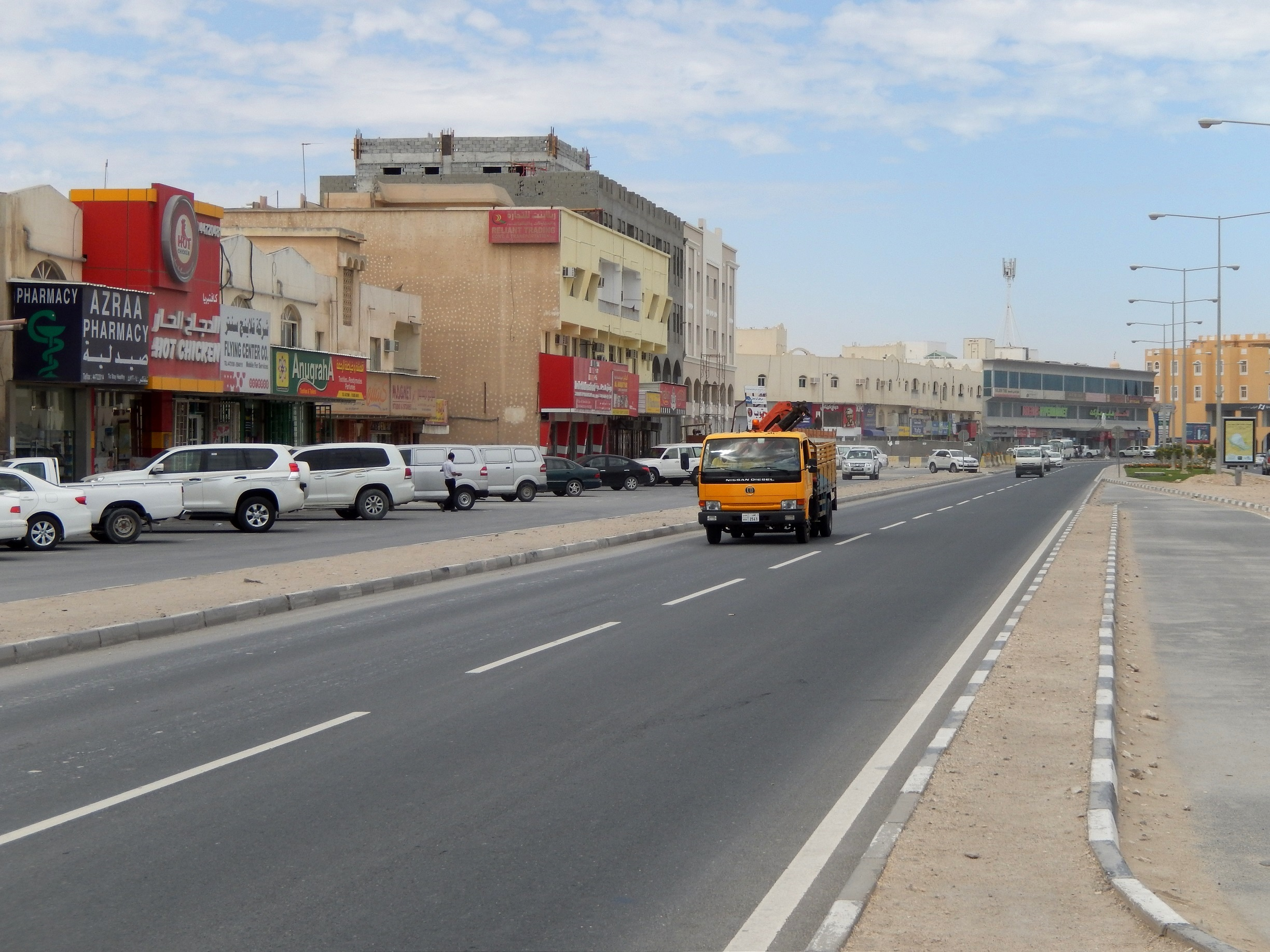
Al Thakhira Road in Al Khor City

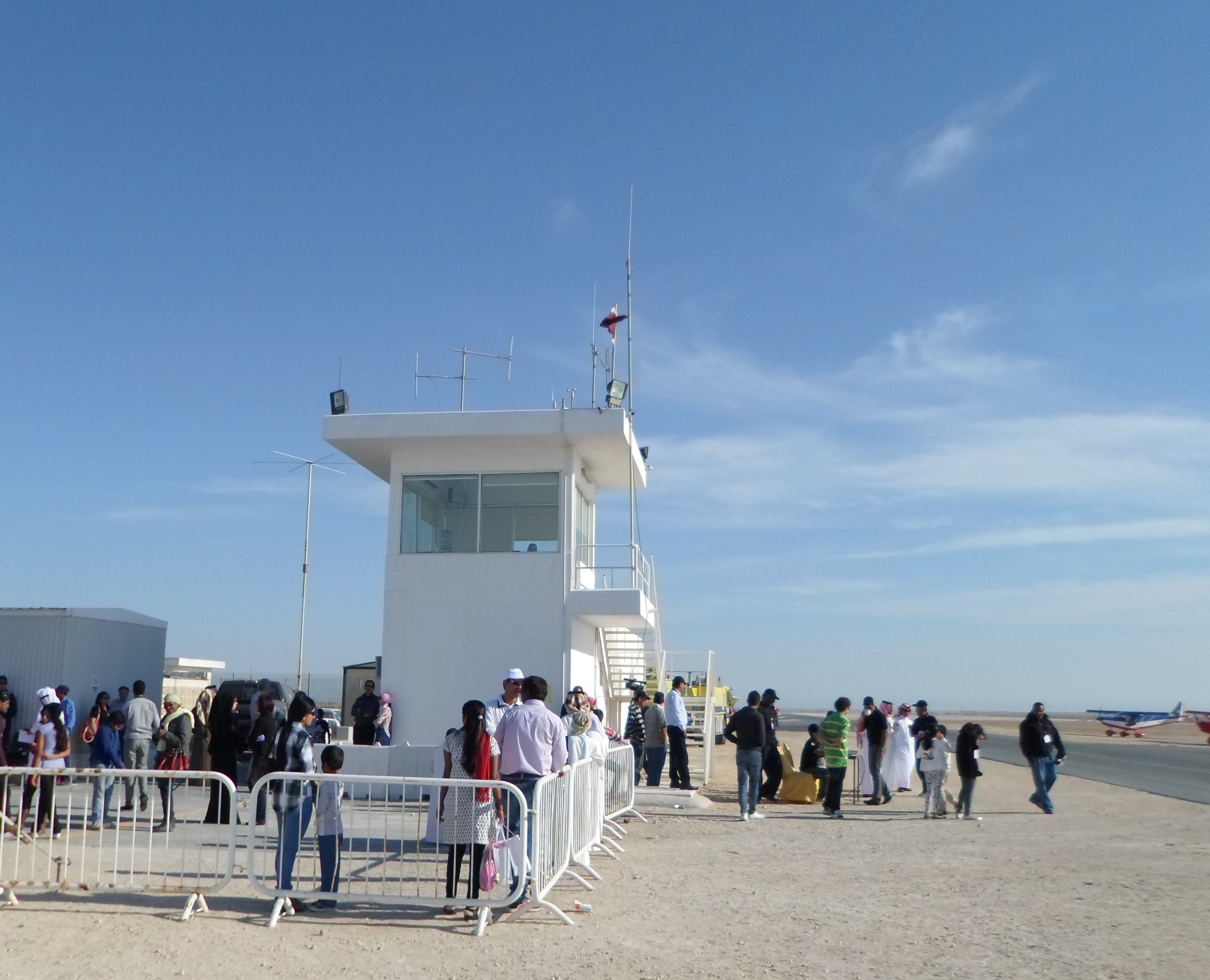
Air traffic control tower at Al Khor Airport

=== Roads ===
Turkish company Tekfen was contracted to construct the $2.1 billion Al Khor Expressway in August 2016. The expressway is designed to be 34 kilometres (21 miles) in length and will run from Doha Golf Club in Al Egla, a locality of Al Daayen, up to Al Bayt Stadium in Al Khor City. A designated bicycle lane and ten interchanges are to be incorporated as part of the project.

Commutes between the capital Doha and the municipality of Al Khor are currently facilitated by Al Shamal Road and Al Khor Coastal Road, with the latter road running through Al Daayen and the former running through Umm Salal.

=== Air ===
Aviation traffic is controlled by Al Khor Airport in Al Khor City. The airport is mostly used by general aviation aircraft and has served as the venue of the annual Al Khor Fly-In since 2008. The fly-in lasts for two days and allows visitors to travel in and spectate aircraft. Aircraft from other GCC countries are showcased at the event.

=== Rail ===
The Doha Metro's Red Line (also known as Coast Line) will extend to Al Khor. Red Line is separated into two divisions: Red Line North and Red Line South. The former will run from Mushayrib Station to Al Khor City, over a length of 55.7 kilometres (34.6 miles).

== Sports ==
Al Bayt Stadium under construction

The municipality is represented by the sports club Al-Khor SC, which play in Al-Khor SC Stadium in the municipality's capital city. Al Bayt Stadium, also in Al Khor City, was completed for the 2022 FIFA World Cup. Al Bayt Stadium, which translates to 'the house', is designed to replicate a traditional tent used by Qatari nomads. The seating capacity is 68,895 spectators, and it hosted the semi-final between France and Morocco on 14 December 2022.

Al Thakhira has its own amateur football league. In 2005, Al Thakhira FC was formed and has competed in the QFA-sanctioned Qatar Amateur League since 2013.

Barwa Al Khor formally opened Al Khor Workers Sports Complex in the Al Khor Industrial Area in February 2014. Intended to serve the entire municipality of Al Khor as well as portions of Al Shamal Municipality, the sporting facilities within this massive complex include four cricket fields, four football fields, four basketball courts and three volleyball courts. In addition, there are 35 shops, 2 cinemas and a mosque among its facilities. In 2015, over 500,000 people had visited the complex.

== Visitor attractions ==
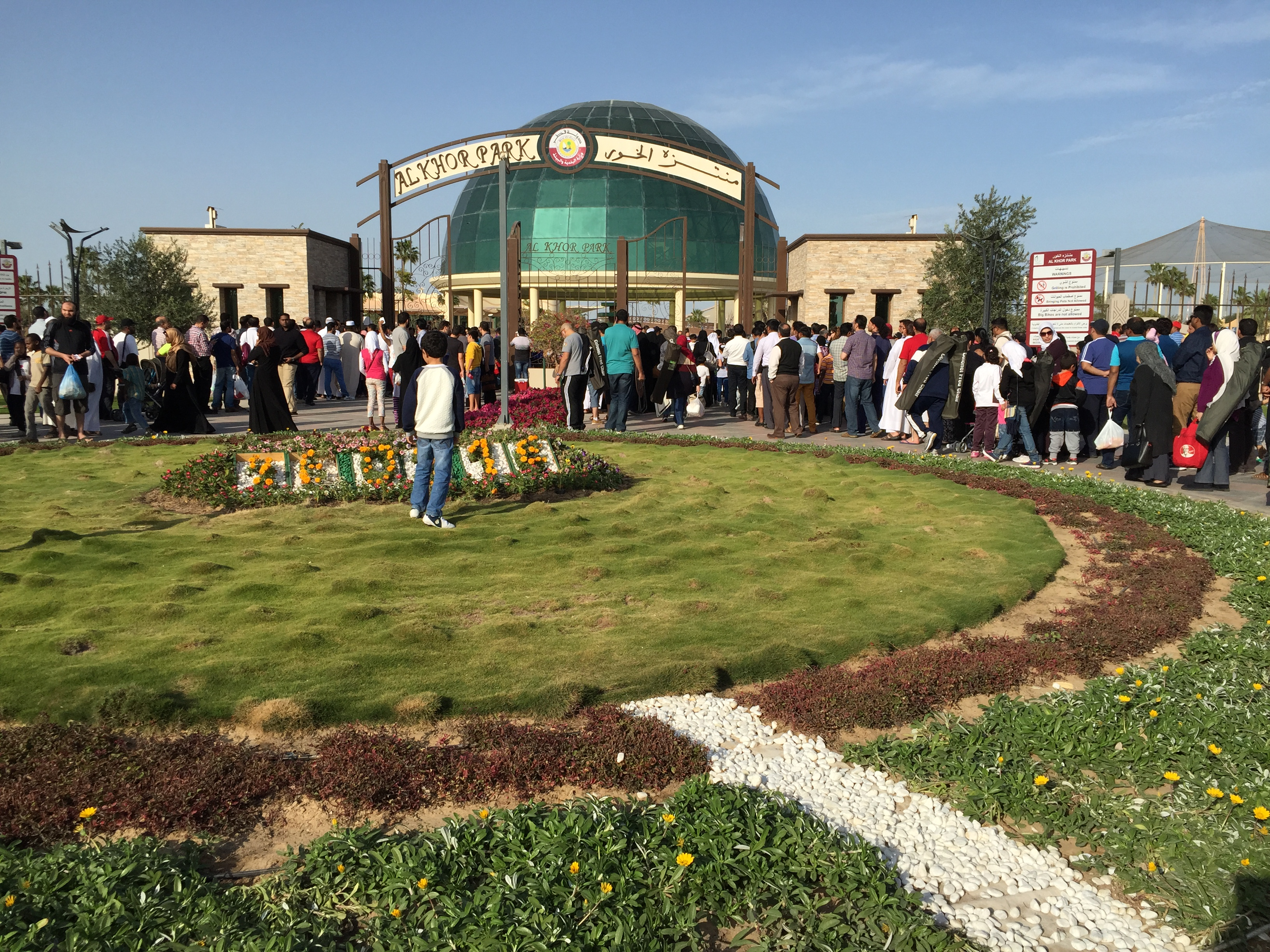
Entrance to Al Khor Park

According to the Ministry of Municipality and Environment, the municipality hosts 7 parks as of 2018. Al Khor City has the largest park in the municipality – Al Khor Park with an area of 240,000 square metres (2,600,000 sq ft). Starting in June 2010, the government has invested QR 250 million in refurbishing the park. This has resulted in the development of new facilities in the park such as a mini-golf course, a railway station and a museum. Al Thakhira also has a major park, opened in 2009 and covering an area of 14,580 square metres (156,900 sq ft). Al Ghuwariyah opened its own park in 2017 over an area of 9,234 square metres (99,390 sq ft).

Al Khor Island (commonly known as Purple Island) is located near Al Khor City. Considered to be a domestic ecotourism destination, the island is connected to the mainland by a tapered dirt path which runs through a number of streams. Aside from its scenic landscape, the island is also known for its historical role in the Kassite dyeing industry dating back several thousand years.

== Demographics ==
The following table is a breakdown of registered live births by nationality and sex for Al Khor. Places of birth are based on the home municipality of the mother at birth.

Registered live births by nationality and sex
Year	Qatari			Non-Qatari			Total		
Year	M	F	Total	M	F	Total	M	F	Total
1984	70	45	115	25	24	49	95	69	164
1985	47	38	85	20	15	35	67	53	120
1986	50	57	107	21	24	45	71	81	152
1987	52	42	94	23	28	51	75	70	145
1988	56	42	98	21	27	48	77	69	146
1989	51	50	101	25	28	53	76	78	154
1990	74	48	122	27	28	55	101	76	177
1991	58	57	115	23	21	44	81	78	159
1992	63	64	127	19	35	54	82	99	181
1993	62	72	134	23	21	44	85	93	178
1994	N/A								
1995	73	54	127	19	22	41	92	76	168
1996	73	68	141	24	23	47	97	91	188

Registered live births by nationality and sex
Year	Qatari			Non-Qatari			Total		
Year	M	F	Total	M	F	Total	M	F	Total
1997	72	77	149	18	16	34	90	93	183
1998	86	67	153	34	29	63	120	96	216
1999	64	83	147	34	28	62	98	111	209
2000	70	80	150	34	40	74	104	120	224
2001	76	75	151	67	50	117	143	125	268
2002	93	82	175	57	56	113	150	138	288
2003	97	90	187	59	53	112	156	143	299
2004	93	75	168	59	67	126	152	142	294
2005	87	79	166	72	54	126	159	133	292
2006	89	89	178	75	68	143	164	157	321
2007	78	114	192	85	68	153	163	182	345
2008	103	93	196	117	94	211	220	187	407
2009	114	131	245	132	114	246	246	245	491
