= Al Thakhira =

Al Thakhira الذخيرة
- Town
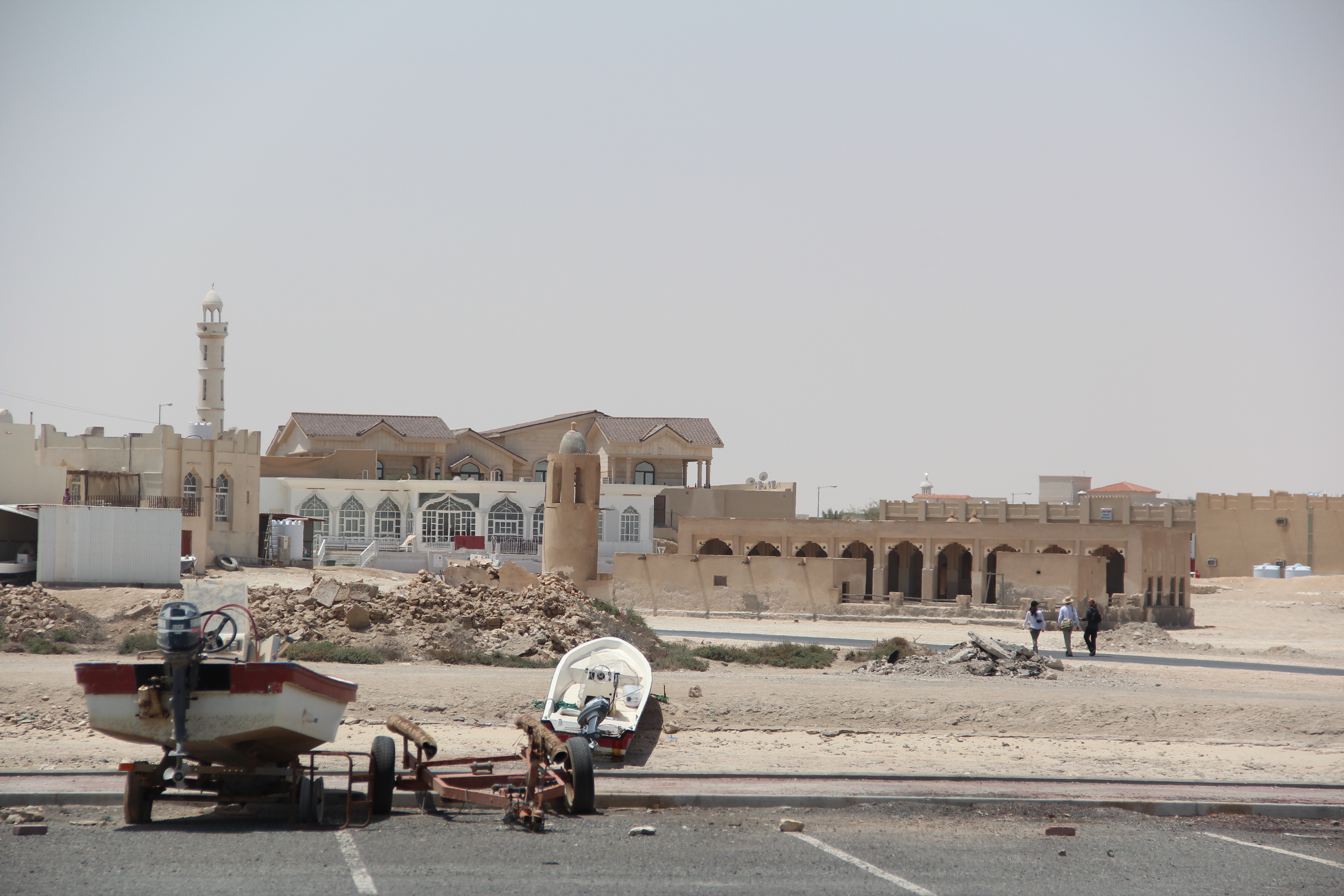
- A view of Al Thakhira from the beach.

- Location within Qatar
- Coordinates: 25°44′05″N 51°32′51″E
- Country: Qatar
- Municipality: Al Khor
- Zone: Zone 75
- District no.: 307

Area
  - Total: 23.7 km^{2} (9.2 sq mi)
- Elevation: 5 m (16 ft)

Population (2021)
  - Total: 6,172
  - Density: 260/km^{2} (674/sq mi)

Al Thakhira (Arabic: الذخيرة, romanized: Adh Dhakhīrah, lit. 'provision') is a town on the coast of the Al Khor municipality in Qatar, about 7 kilometres (4.3 mi) northeast of the city of Al Khor and 60 kilometres (37 mi) from the capital Doha.

Al Thakhira developed in close connection with Al Khor, with both towns traditionally associated with the Al Muhannadi tribe, who settled the region in the mid-18th century. As with other coastal communities in Qatar, its early inhabitants depended on pearling and fishing as their main sources of livelihood.

== Etymology ==
The name Al Thakhira derives from the Arabic root dh-kh-r (ذ خ ر), from which the word thukhr is formed, meaning "provision" or "store". According to the classical dictionary Lisan al-Arab, the term can also refer to saving oneself.

The Ministry of Municipality and Environment offers two main explanations for the toponym. One attributes it to the area's historical role as a large-scale storage site for goods such as grain, currency, and ammunition. The other, more widely circulated account, relates to a lost sailor who found refuge there during a storm; locals assisted him and his crew, leading him to label the area Al Thakhira, Arabic for "the provision", in gratitude for the safety it provided.

Qatari historian Abdullah Al Hassan Al Muhannadi identified the sailor as a British embassy naval captain whose vessel had taken shelter at the site. A variant of this narrative, recorded by Ali bin Khamees Al Muhannadi in his book Memories of Al Thakhira, links the name instead to a Persian sea captain. The captain, commanding a vessel heavily laden with goods, had anchored at a port on the Persian coast known as Taban. When a sudden storm arose, he feared the ship would capsize amid the high waves. Taban Port, though sheltered, was prone to flooding, making it hazardous for anchored ships. In search of safer waters, the captain steered his vessel westward, first reaching the cape of Umraih, then passing by Umm Sa'a, until finally arriving at the inlet now known as Al Thakhira. Struck by its tranquility, he remained there for several days and is said to have named the place in recognition of the refuge it offered.

Alternative forms of the name include Ad Dhakhīrah, Adh Dhukhayr, and Al Zakhira.

== History ==
=== 20th century ===
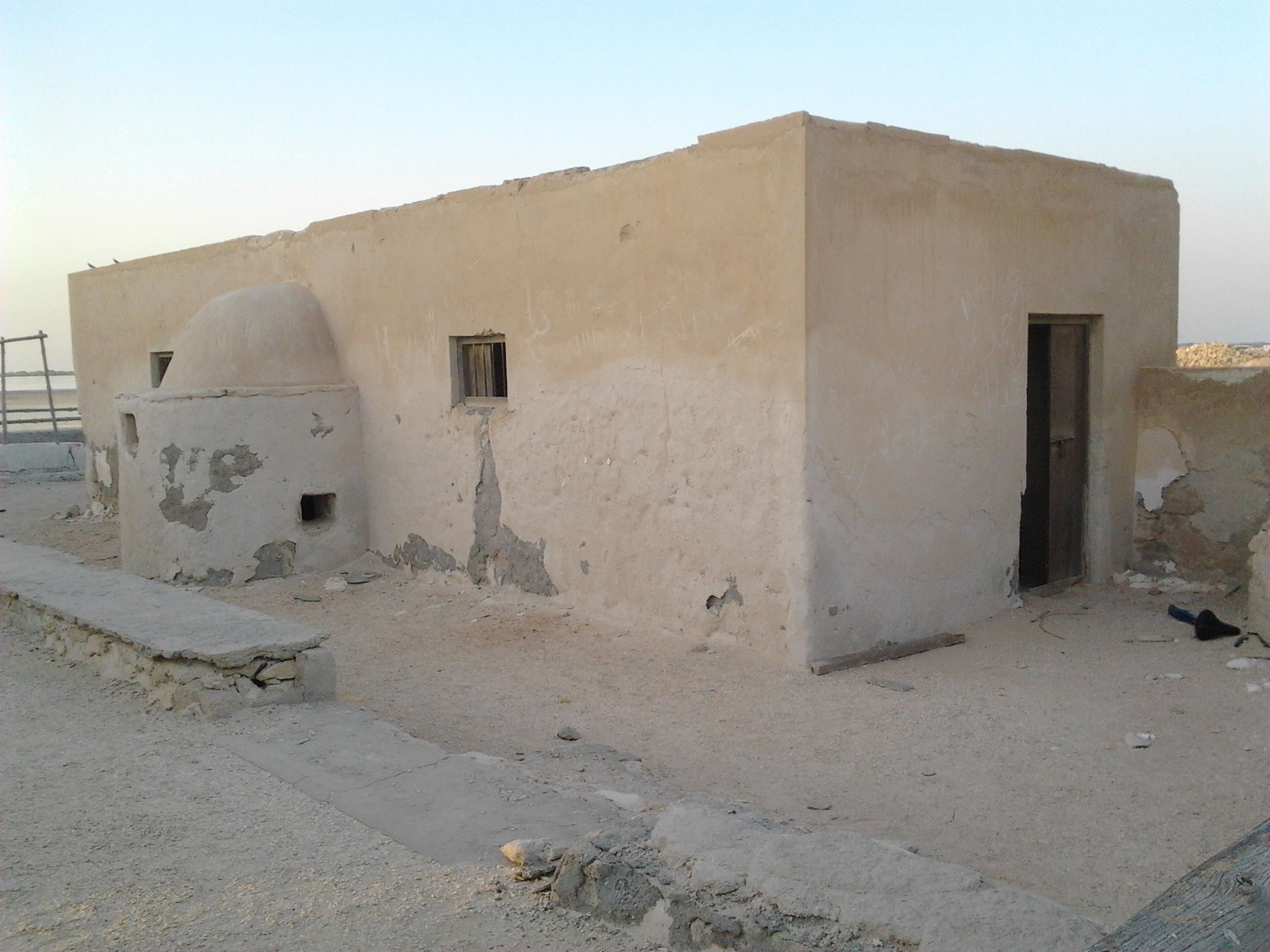
A historic mosque in Al Thakhira

Al Thakhira was founded by members of the Al Muhannadi tribal confederation, primarily the Al Ibrahim family, who migrated there from nearby Al Khor. Historically of strategic importance, Al Thakhira served as a natural inlet sheltered by mangrove forests and functioned as a minor maritime anchorage. Its coastal waters, rich in marine biodiversity, also provided suitable fishing grounds.

Around 1910, another branch of the Al Muhannadi, the Al Hassan, migrated to the area from Al Khor following a sojourn in Al Jumail on the northern coast, where they had established a thriving village with houses and a fort. Tensions later arose between the Al Hassan and Al Ibrahim branches, prompting the Al Ibrahim clan to return to Al Khor, while the Al Hassan family remained in Al Thakhira, where they continue to reside into the 21st century. Aside from the Al Hassan, the Al Laqan tribe also resided there. The village was known for its active majlis culture, particularly during Ramadan.

J.G. Lorimer's Gazetteer of the Persian Gulf gives an account of Al Thakhira in 1908:

A village on the east coast of Qatar, situated on a khor or inlet of the same name about 30 miles north of Doha, and consisting of about 300 houses of the Mahandah (Al Muhannadi) tribe. The people are all pearl-divers, following no other occupation except fishing and owning no flocks or herds. Fifteen pearl boats [manned by 180 men], two other sea-going boats of the mushuwah type and five fishing boats are owned at Dhakhira. Transport animals are 10 camels. Drinking water is from Lubwairdah, 2 miles to the north-west.

At its height, the village had approximately eleven pearling vessels, predominantly of the sambuk and jalboot types, while the nearby town of Al Khor supported a fleet of roughly one hundred, according to historian Ali bin Khamees in Memories of Al Thakhira. Some of the pearl banks mentioned by Khamees include Al Hazf, Umm Al Shayf, Al Shaghiyah, and Kharis, among others. The depths of these pearling sites varied, with those near Al Thakhira averaging between four and five fathoms, and others reaching up to eleven fathoms. Divers would typically remain at a productive site for two or three days before relocating.

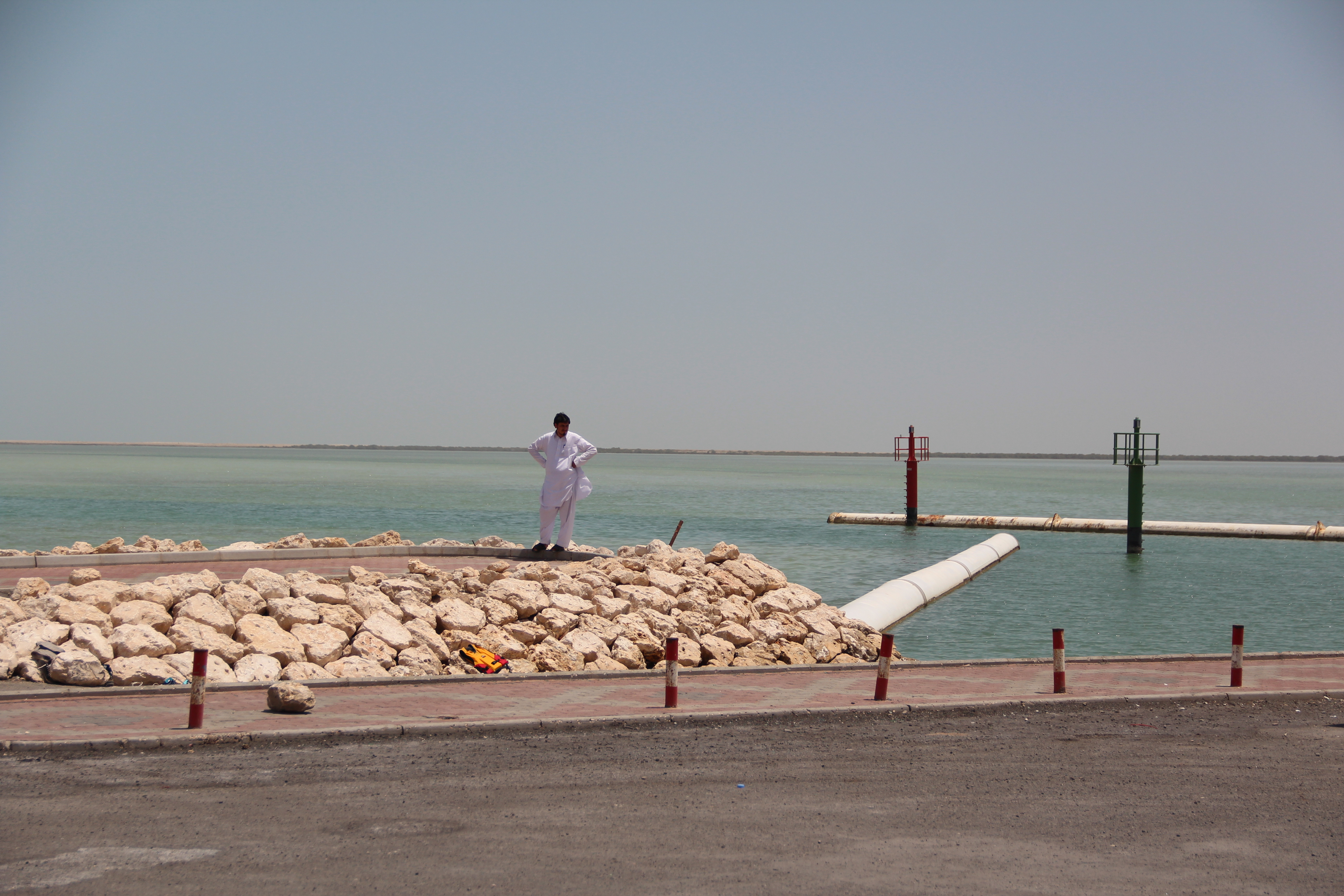
Al Thakhira coastline

After a successful diving season, it was customary for Qatari divers to travel to Qatif in eastern Saudi Arabia to purchase dates, before proceeding to Bahrain to buy textiles and household goods. The pearling season was divided into distinct phases. The primary season, lasting four months, was followed by shorter auxiliary periods such as al raddah (autumn diving) and al radidah (a return to sea before winter). Divers from Al Thakhira initially searched the waters immediately offshore; if yields were poor, they proceeded to more distant northern or southern banks within Qatar's territorial waters. Qatari pearling grounds were also frequented by vessels from neighboring Gulf states. Kuwaiti ships, including large vessels (abwam, or booms) would travel to Qatari waters when local yields declined. Divers from Bahrain, Abu Dhabi and Dubai also frequented these waters.

Following the conclusion of the pearling season, the residents of Al Thakhira, like many coastal communities in Qatar, would haul their boats ashore and migrate inland for the winter months. According to Ali bin Khamees in Memories of Al Thakhira, this seasonal practice involved relocating to nearby fertile depressions (rawdat), where families erected tents and engaged in pastoral activities, tending to their flocks of sheep, goats, camels, and horses. Temporary majlis structures were constructed adjacent to their encampments and served as communal reception spaces for guests. Hospitality practices varied according to the host's means: some would offer dairy products such as butter and milk, while others prepared traditional dishes like khabees, a sweet blend of flour and dates, or meidam, a local rice dish topped with clarified animal fat. Families settled in loosely organized quarters known as fereej, each consisting of several tents or huts and often named after prominent individuals in the group. They remained in these desert encampments for up to four months.

During this period, they engaged in the collection and storage of various types of native grasses to feed their livestock during the arid summer months. These grasses included species locally known as samma (Stipellula capensis), daqiqah (Tripleurospermum auriculatum), sukhbur, and thumam (Panicum turgidum) and were harvested and transported by camel to be stored in purpose-built mudbrick granaries known as mutaban. These structures were designed to preserve the fodder in anticipation of harsher conditions later in the year. One of the more verdant areas favored for gathering grains was Umm Birka, situated northwest of Al Khor, which served as a seasonal retreat and grazing zone for families from both Al Khor and Al Thakhira.

The first local contracting company was founded in the 1930s by merchant Issa bin Ali Abu Jamhour Al Mohannadi. His company was responsible for building many of the local houses, wells and mosques in the village.

=== 21st century ===
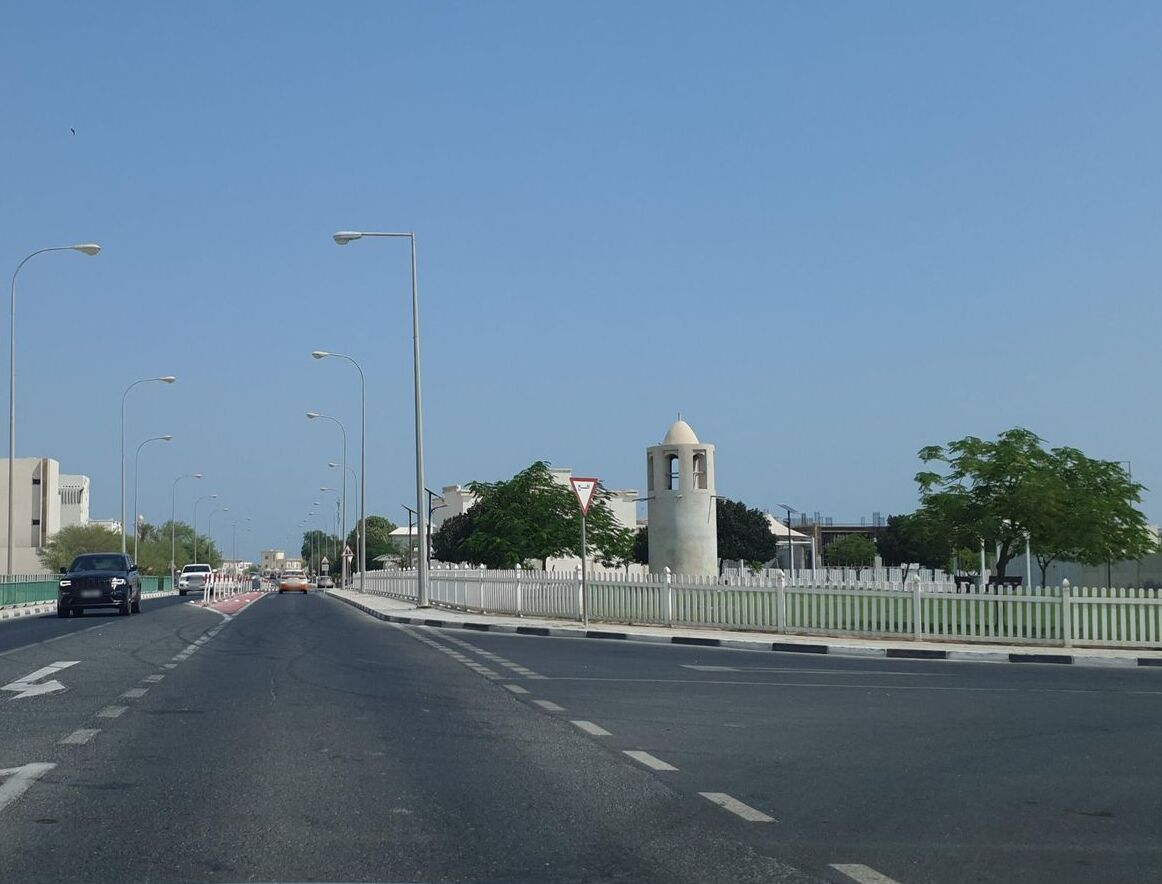
The heritage minaret as seen from Main Al Thakhira Street

In 2017, the Municipality constructed a heritage-style minaret monument at the town's entrance to commemorate local heritage.

RRC Studio Architects Milan was behind a project to expand Al Thakhira two-fold in preparation for the 2022 FIFA World Cup. As part of the project, 275,000 m² of new commercial and residential infrastructure was created. Protected areas for mangroves in the town's north and south sectors were also designated.

== Geography ==
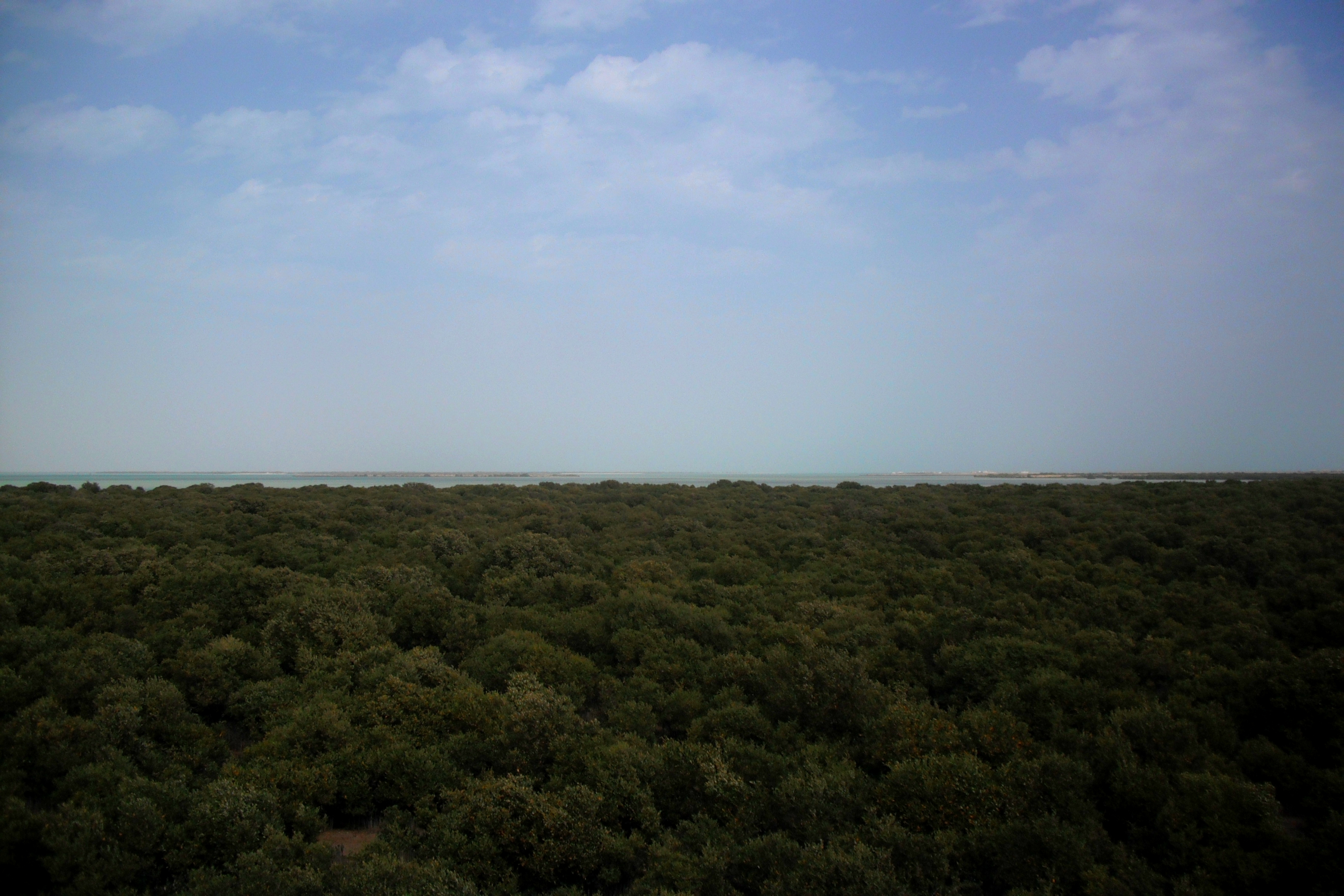
Mangrove forest in Al Thakhira

Together with Al Khor, roughly 1,392 hectares of mangroves are found along the shoreline and the inlet at the town's eastern edge, making the coastline between Al Thakhira and Al Khor the most densely populated mangrove habitat in Qatar. Historically, these trees did not grow near the coast but were located farther inland. Their current coastal distribution is attributed to the action of sea currents, which likely deposited mangrove seeds along the shore over many years.

Other common vegetation found in Al Thakhira include mature shrubs of the Taverniera genus, including aelijaan (Taverniera spartea) and dahseer (Taverniera aegyptiaca), Aizoanthemum hispanicum on rocky high elevations, Caroxylon cyclophyllum, and Soda inermis.

In a 2010 survey of Al Thakhira's coastal waters conducted by the Qatar Statistics Authority, the average depth was recorded as 4.7 meters (15 ft) and average pH was 8.07. The waters had a salinity of 49.04 psu, an average temperature of 24.66 °C and 6.64 mg/L of dissolved oxygen.

=== Al Thakhira Reserve ===
The area is home to Al Thakhira Nature Reserve, which encompasses the small mangrove-covered island of Umm Al Far, parts of the coastline, and multiple wadis and sabkhas. Mangroves are very common, extending throughout the reserve for about 14 square kilometers, and it is one of the few areas of Qatar to boast natural tree growth. It was designated as a nature reserve by the government in 2006.

=== Waab Bin Ramzan ===
Waab Bin Ramzan is a prominent depression historically frequented by the residents of Al Thakhira during the winter. The term waab refers to a low-lying, expansive, and moisture-retaining area where rainwater would accumulate for several weeks, creating a temporary wetland. Once the water receded, the site became fertile ground for various wild plants and grasses. The area earned its name from a man of the Al Ramzan tribe who is said to have died there long ago. In later years, the site was settled by Hamad bin Lahoub Al Hassan Al Mohannadi after he relocated from Al Thakhira.

=== Umraih ===
Also spelled as Muray, Umraih is a cape located near Al Thakhira. Historically, it was known for its rich fish stocks and was deep enough to accommodate the docking and maintenance of large vessels. The name derives from the Arabic raha, meaning "to rest", earning this name as it was used as a rest stop for weary travelers.

=== Umm Al Far ===
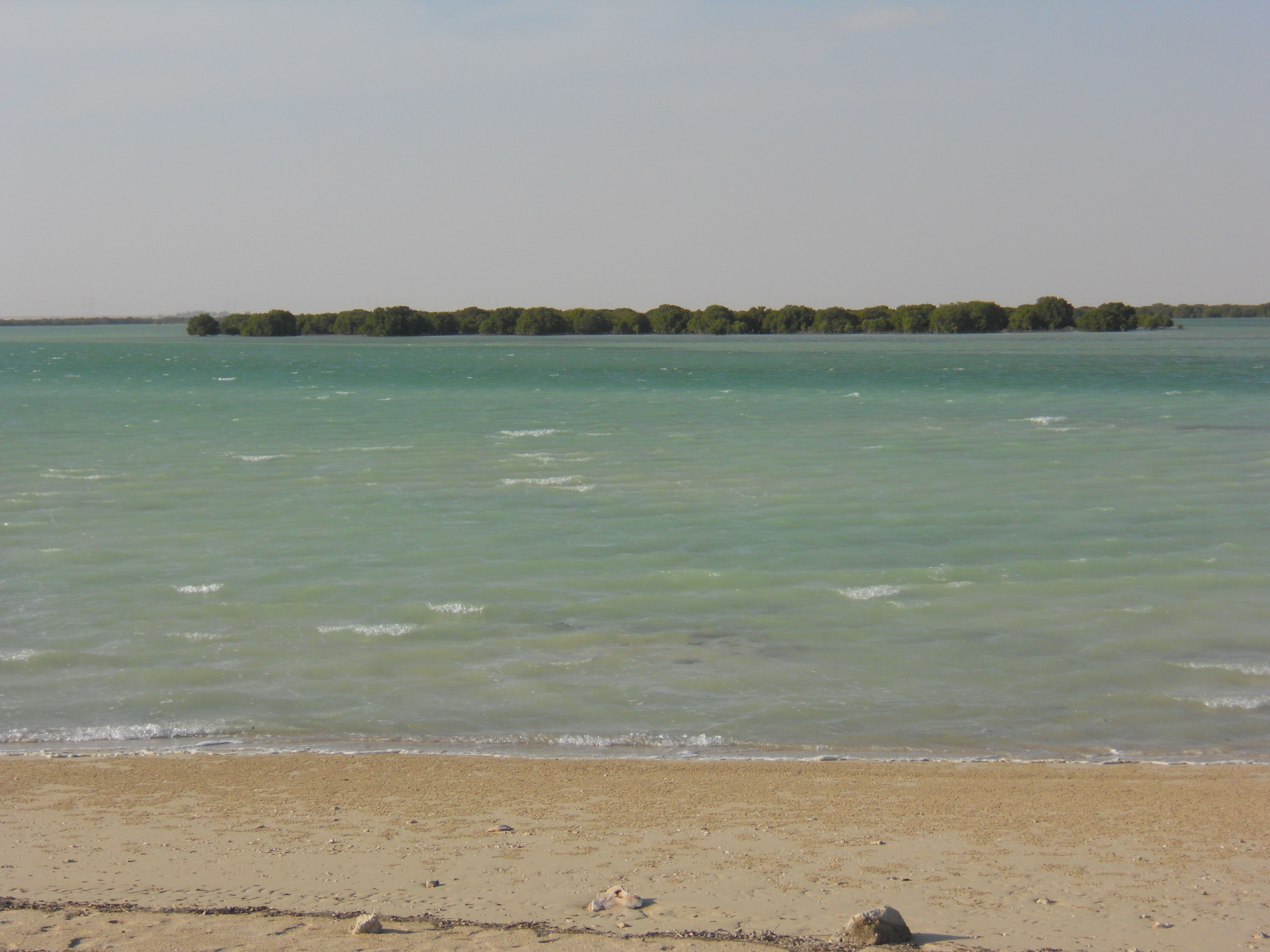
Umm Al Far island, noted for its dense mangrove cover

Umm Al Far is an island off the coast of Al Thakhira that formerly served as a mooring site for Qatari and Bahraini vessels. Aside from its plentiful mangrove population, the island was known for its abundant fishing grounds, especially for the safi (Siganus canaliculatus) species, which remains a staple in the local diet. Numerous migratory birds can also be spotted near the island. The island's name, translating to "mother of rats" in Arabic, was so named for its rat infestation at the time of its discovery.

== Landmarks ==
=== Al Thakhira Grand Mosque ===
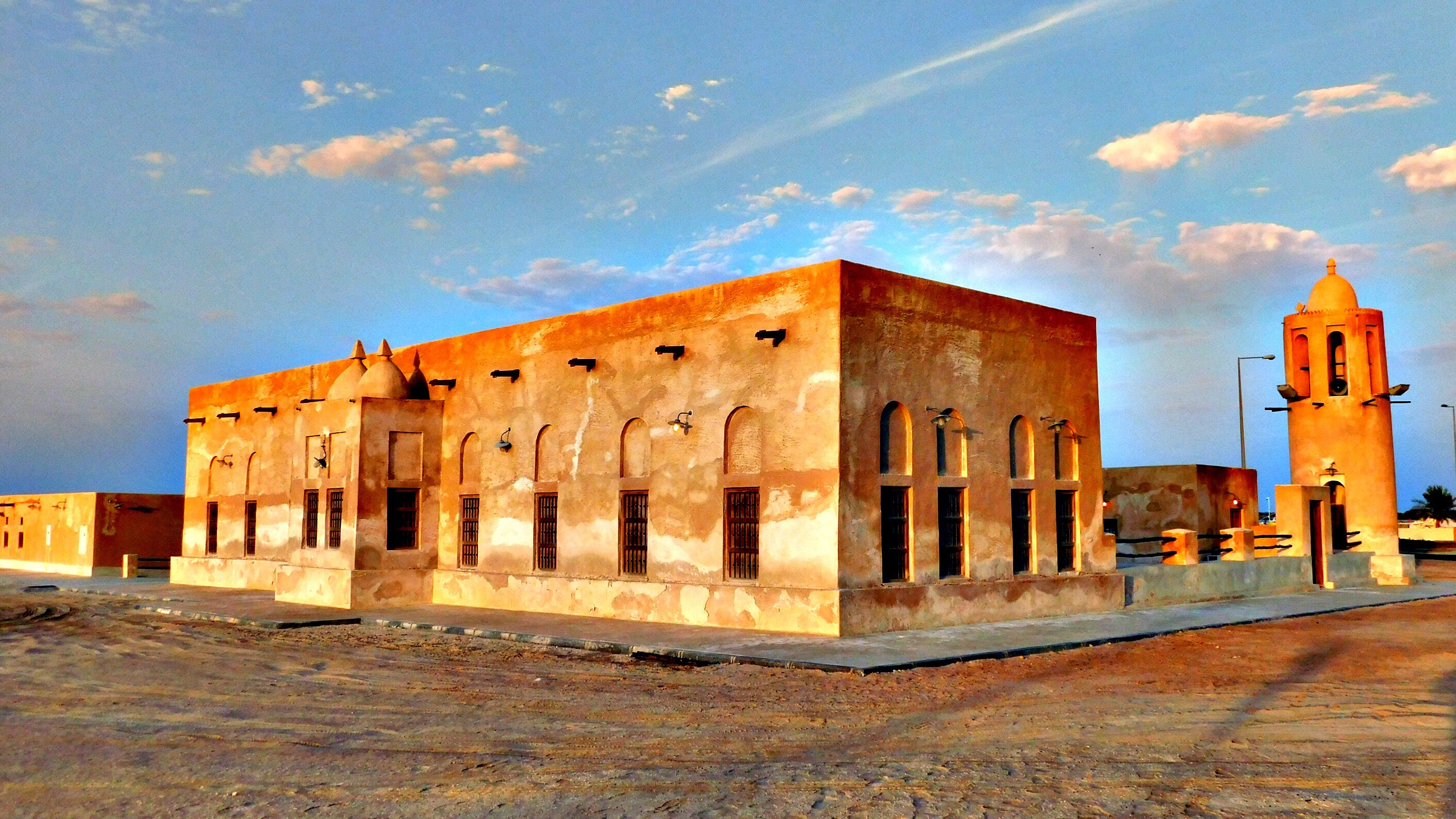
Close-up view of Al Thakhira Grand Mosque in 2021

Among the town's most notable attractions is the Al Thakhira Grand Mosque, constructed in c. 1900 by Ibrahim bin Abdullah Al Ansari and situated near the old harbor. The mosque served as a center for prayer and Islamic learning, with a Qur'an school (kuttab) attached to it. Following the death of its founder, the mosque continued to be used for religious instruction under Mulla Hussein Al Ansari, who was then succeeded by Sheikh Ibrahim bin Abdulwahab Al Mutawaa. It was later renovated and registered with Qatar Museums and the Ministry of Culture. According to local accounts, the mosque originally featured simple materials: mud, stone, and wood. However, it underwent restoration in 1959 and, later in 2015, under the supervision of the Private Engineering Office.

Architecturally, the mosque has a rectangular open sahn (courtyard) and a prayer hall comprising two long arcades (riwaq) facing the qibla direction. Its interior walls are built from stone, and the main entrance is located on the southern wall of the courtyard, with a small ablution well still present in one corner. A square room for the imam is integrated into the north wall, while the main minaret occupies the southeast corner. Adjacent to the courtyard, on the eastern wall, is a smaller rectangular prayer niche with a recessed mihrab and two domes: one covering the mihrab and the other the minbar (pulpit).

The minaret has a stone octagonal base, cylindrical shaft, and upper section featuring six rectangular windows for light and ventilation. It is capped by a modest hemispherical dome topped with a wooden crescent, and is accessible from the courtyard via a stone staircase leading to an internal spiral staircase. The mosque's ornamentation includes carved Quranic inscriptions and wooden latticed windows reinforced with exterior iron grilles.

=== Al Thakhira Marina ===
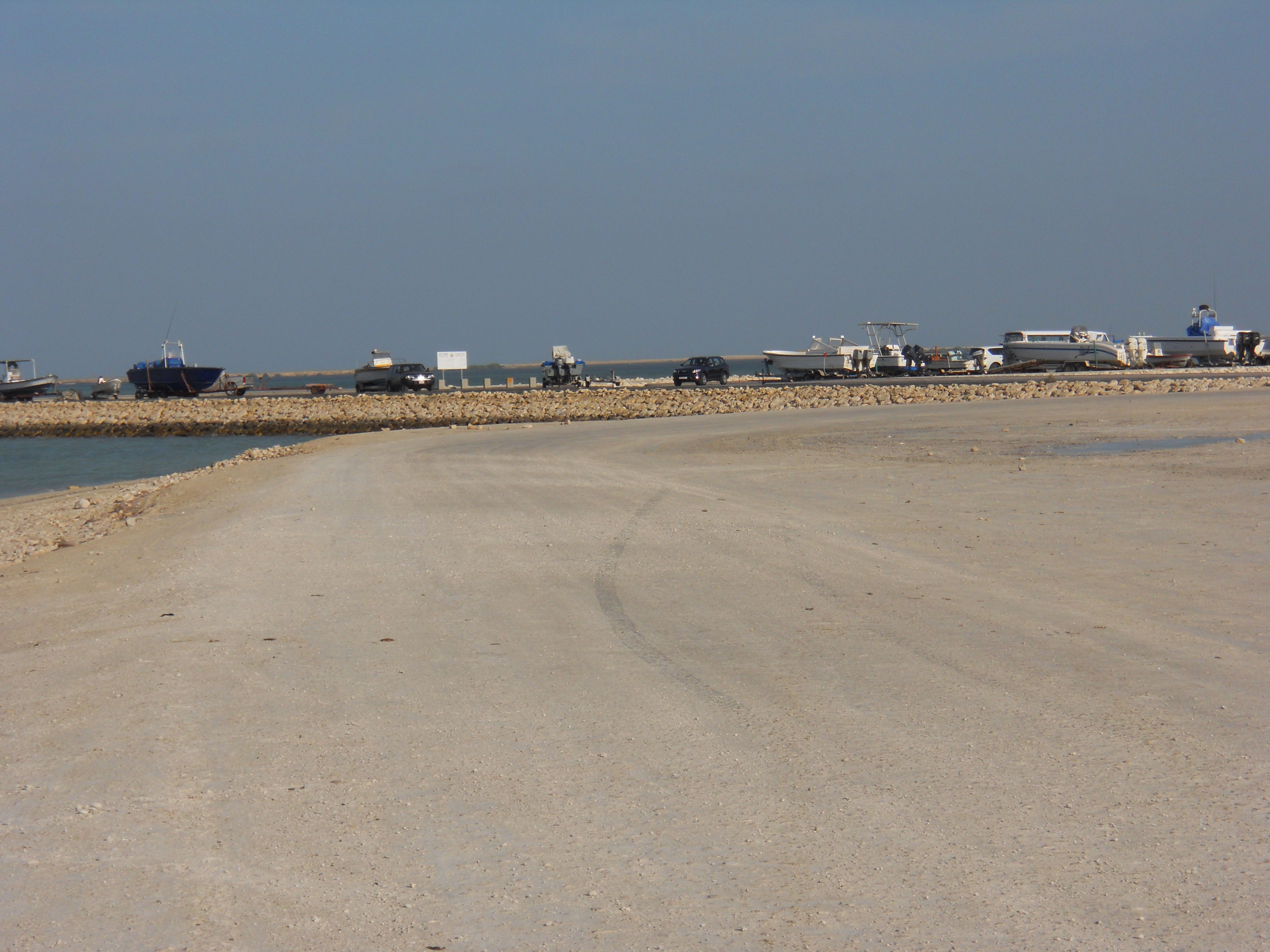
Boats docked at Al Thakhira Marina

Al Thakhira Marina, also known as Al Thakhira Jetty, serves the town's fishing industry. In 2017, the Ministry of Municipality and Environment (MME) announced plans to expand the port. In late 2021, the Fish Affairs Department of the MME announced that it had completed the expansion project at Al Thakhira, constructing an additional 69 berths for boats and 3 berths reserved for coastal security vessels.

=== Al Thakhira Beach ===
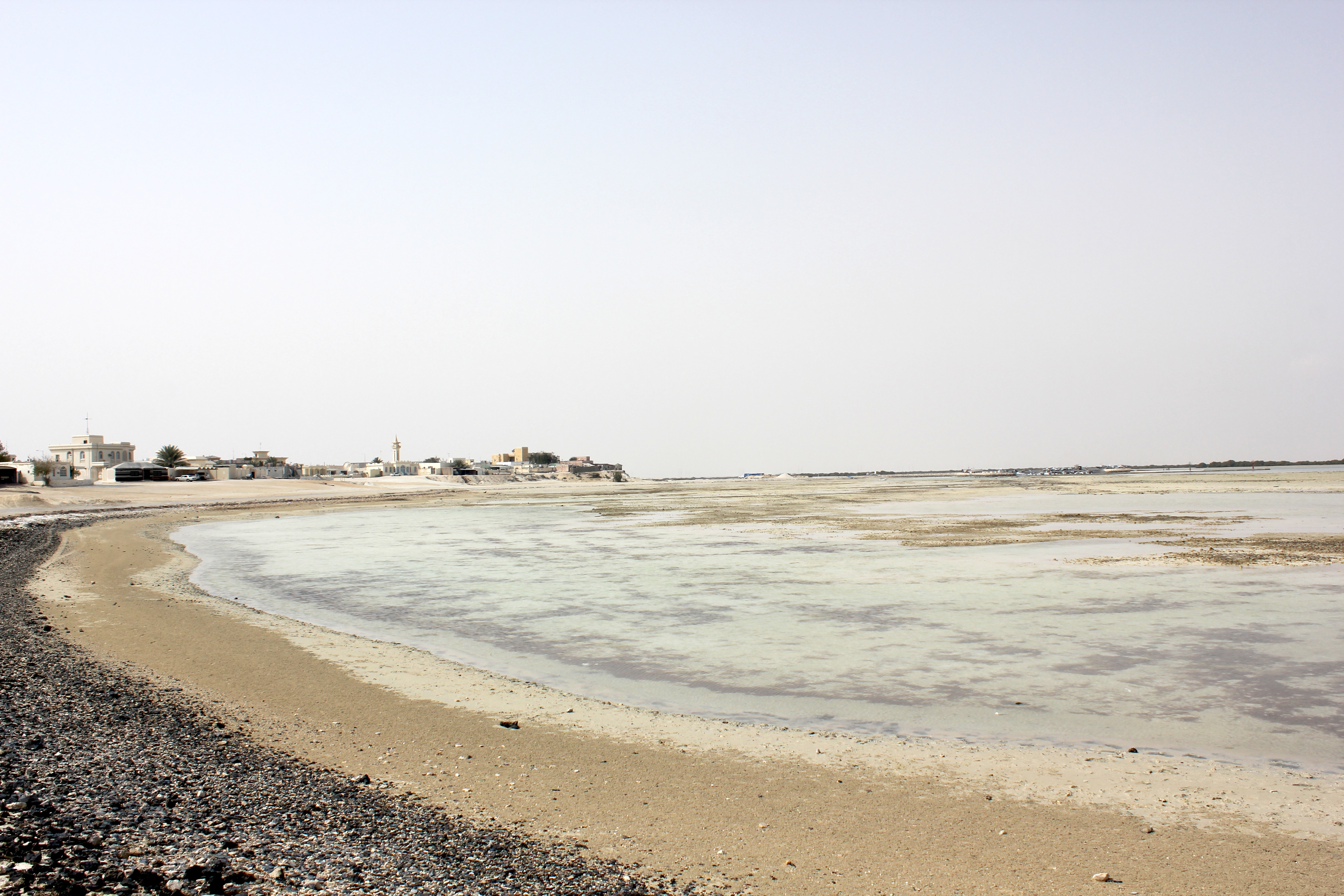
Al Thakhira Beach

Al Thakhira Beach is one of the largest tourist attractions in the town. Running for approximately 10 km, much of its coast is made up of sabkhas (salt flats). Salt-resistant mangroves grow abundantly along its coast. It is a popular spot for bird watchers, attracting species such as herons, terns, and egrets. Furthermore, it is a popular destination for kayaking and fishing. Sea turtles are known to regularly nest on this beach during late spring and early summer.

It is one of the best-preserved beaches in Qatar and receives periodic renovations and cleanups under the auspices of the Ministry of Municipality and Environment (MME). In late 2016, the beach received numerous upgrades, including refurbished playground equipment and the addition of traffic bollards for pedestrian safety.

In March 2019, the 1,800 meter-long and two meter-wide Al Thakhira Walkway was opened alongside the beach. The promenade features two 1,250 m² playgrounds, 93 light poles, dozens of seating areas and a 2,000 meter-long cycle route.

=== Parks ===
Al Thakhira Park was inaugurated in 2009 and spans an area of approximately 14,580 square meters. Designed primarily for families, the park offers various facilities including shaded seating areas, a large children's play zone with protective canopies, and an open-air amphitheater. Recreational sports infrastructure includes basketball and football courts as well as a youth-focused activity zone. A distinctive water fountain serves as one of the park's visual focal points. The park is landscaped with over twenty species of trees, shrubs, and perennial plants, including fruit-bearing date palms, Washingtonia palms, orange trees, Justicia brandegeeana (commonly known as shrimp plant), cycads, Indian canna lilies, and Euphorbia species.

Al Qurm Park, opened in 2014, is a small, secluded park with a dedicated area of 2,014 square meters. It is reserved exclusively for women and children, offering a tranquil and private environment. Among its main features are a shaded playground and a water fountain. The plant life in the park includes around fifteen varieties of trees, shrubs, and perennials, alongside several seasonal flowers. Included among these are productive date palms, sidr (Ziziphus spina-christi), Bahraini almond trees (Terminalia catappa), Bird of Paradise flowers (Caesalpinia pulcherrima), and a centuries-old olive tree. Like Al Thakhira Park, Al Qurm Park is equipped with basic services such as water coolers, parking, restrooms, prayer space, and sports courts.

Sharq Garden was established in March 2019. It spans an area of 4,841 square meters, of which about 3,500 square meters comprises vegetated areas. A footpath stretching for 320 meters and with a width of two meters runs through the park.

== Central Municipal Council ==
When free elections of the Central Municipal Council first took place in Qatar during 1999, Al Thakhira was designated the seat of constituency no. 27. It would remain the headquarters of constituency no. 27 for the next three consecutive elections until the fifth municipal elections in 2015, when it was made the headquarters of constituency no. 26. Also included in its constituency is part of Simaisma, Umm Birka, and Ras Laffan. In the inaugural municipal elections in 1999, Ali Hassan Al-Mohannadi won the elections, receiving 34.4%, or 65 votes. The runner-up candidate was Salem Abdullah Al-Shahwani, whose share of the votes was 19.3%, or 42 votes. Voter turnout was 90.5%. Al-Mohannadi retained his seat in the 2002 and 2007 elections. In 2011, Hamad Lahan Al Mohannadi was elected, and retained his position in the 2015 elections.

Al Thakhira recorded the highest voter turnout percentage at 73.8% in the 2019 municipal elections.

== Sports ==
Al Thakhira has its own amateur football league. In 2005, Al Thakhira FC was formed and has competed in the QFA-sanctioned Qatar Amateur League since 2013.

The Al Thakhira Youth Center, an affiliate of the Ministry of Culture (MOC), serves the town's youth. It was established in 2006 and was named as the Best Youth Center in 2012, 2013 and 2015 by the MOC. The center is active in engaging the region's youth through means such as public awareness campaigns, exhibitions such as the unveiling of Al Bayt Stadium, health campaigns such as blood drives, and summer camps.

== Education ==
The following schools are located in Al Thakhira:

| Name of School | Curriculum | Grade | Genders | Official Website | Ref |
|---|---|---|---|---|---|
| Al Thakhira Primary Girls School | Independent | Primary | Girls-only | N/A | |
| Al Thakhira Model Boys School | Independent | Primary | Boys-only | N/A | |

== Demographics ==
| Year | Population |
|---|---|
| 1986 | 1,891 |
| 1997 | 7,863 |
| 2004 | 13,511 |

== Gallery ==
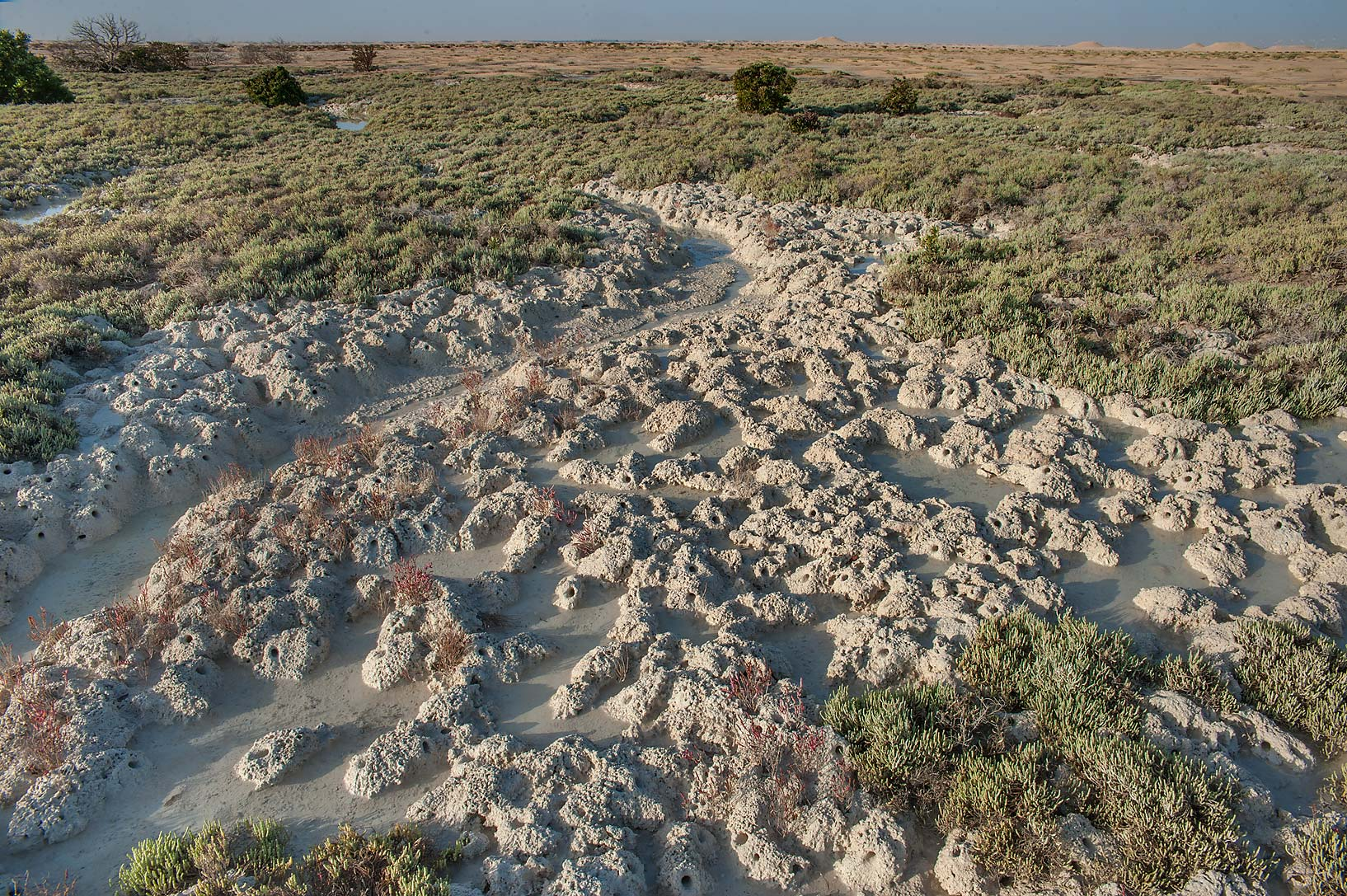
Mud crab burrows in a salt marsh near Al Thakhira

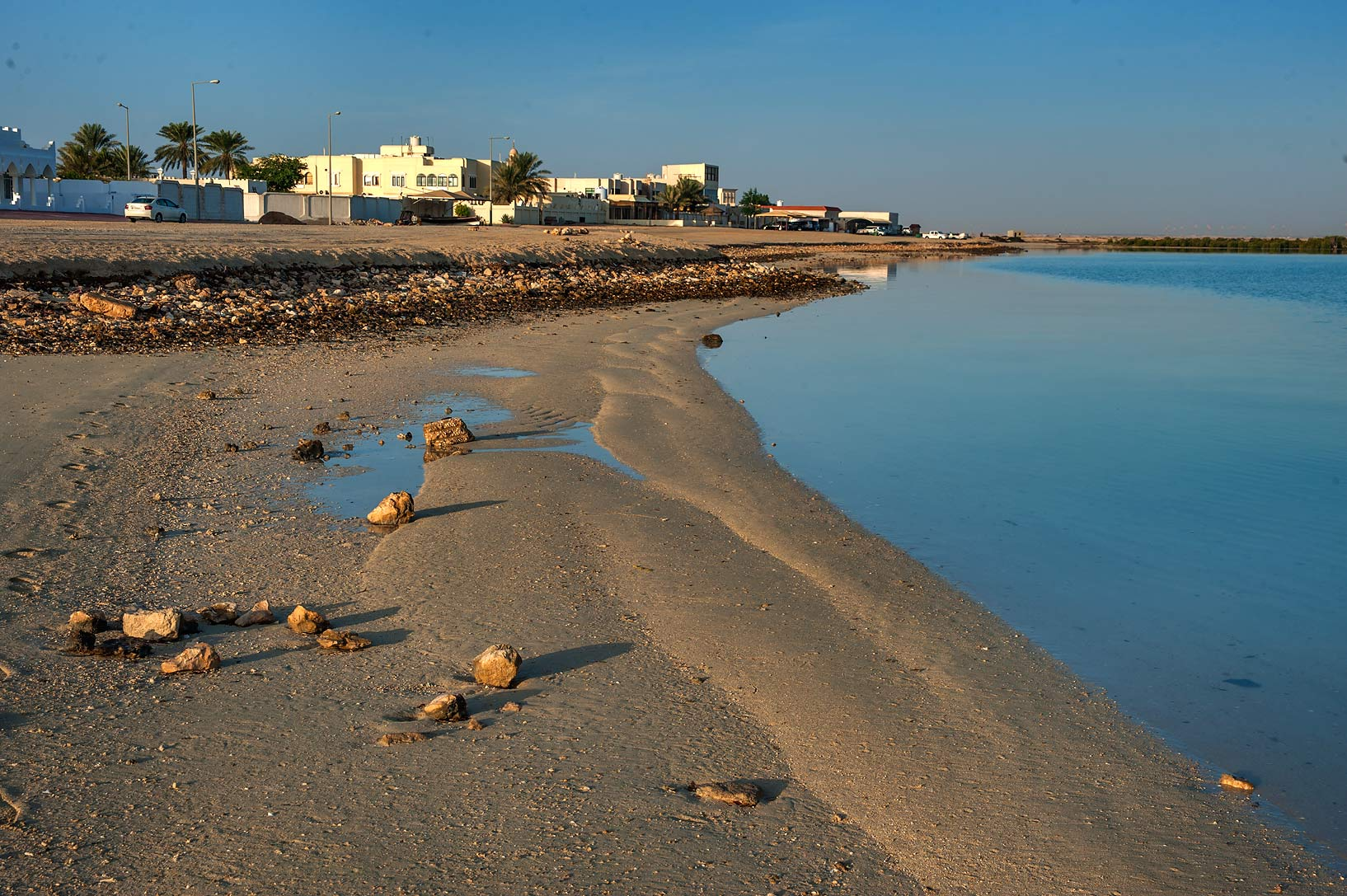
Al Thakhira Beach

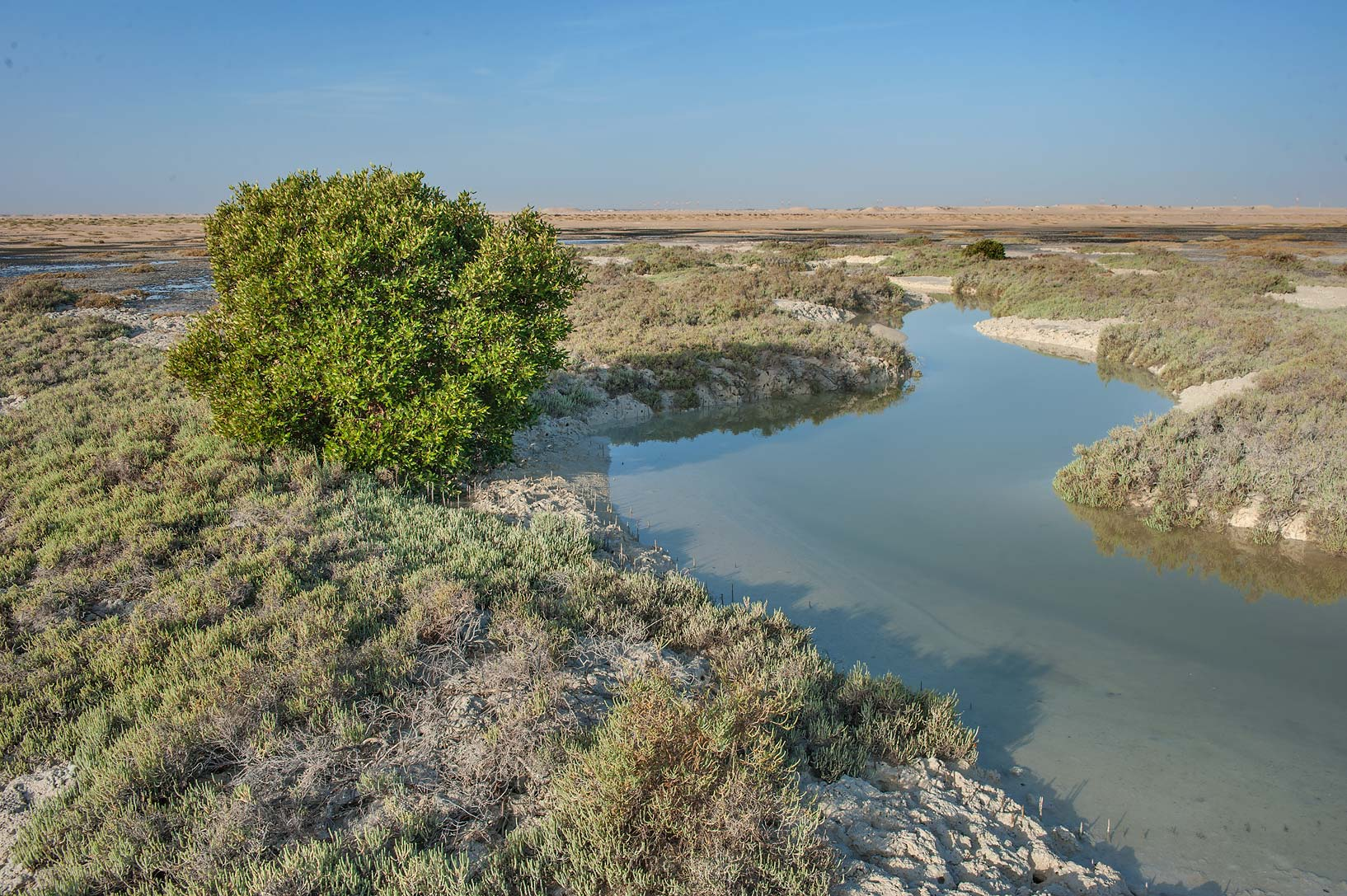
Tidal river in salt marsh near Al Thakhira
