= Simaisma =

Simaisma سُمَيْسِمَة
- Town
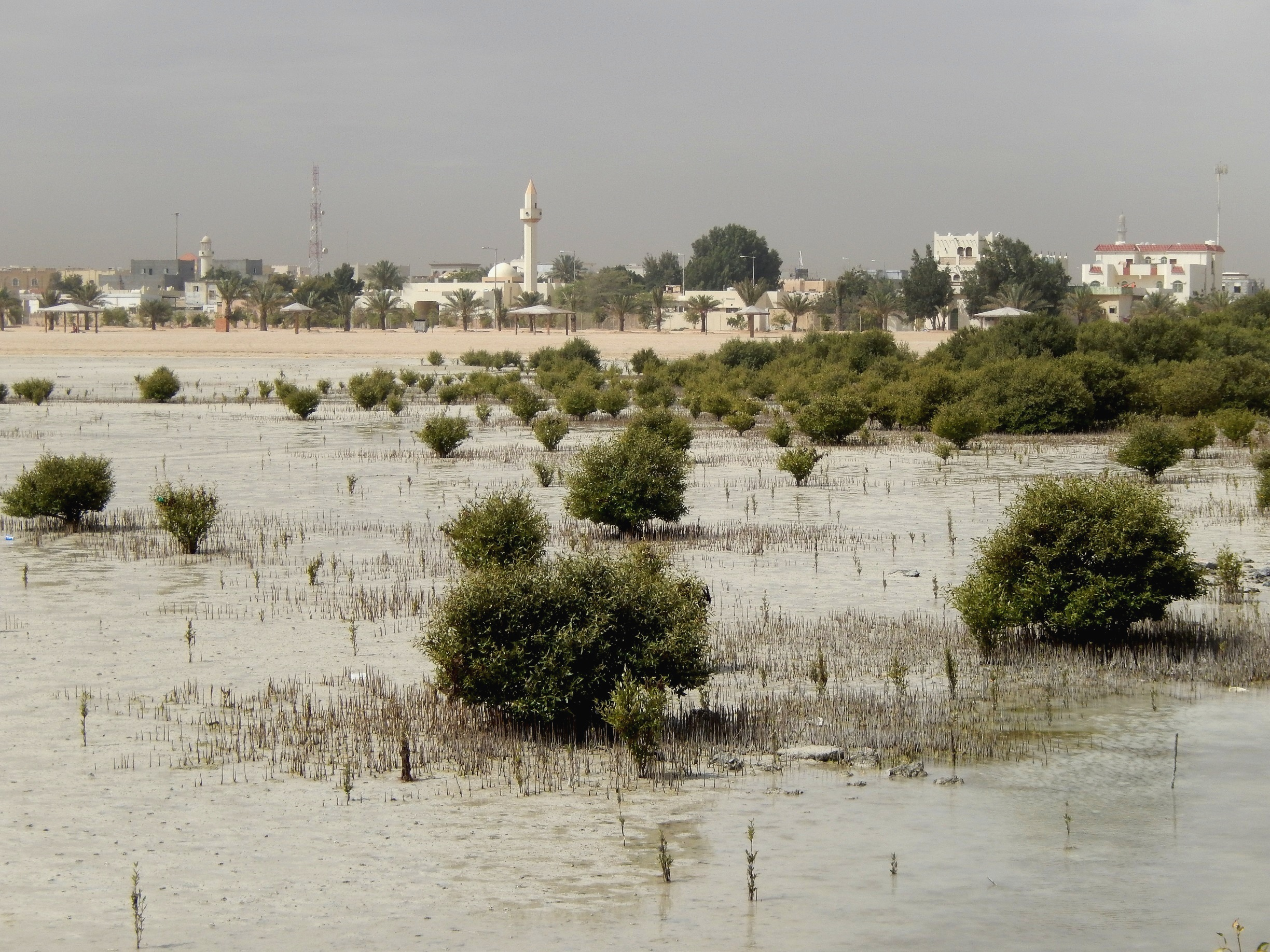
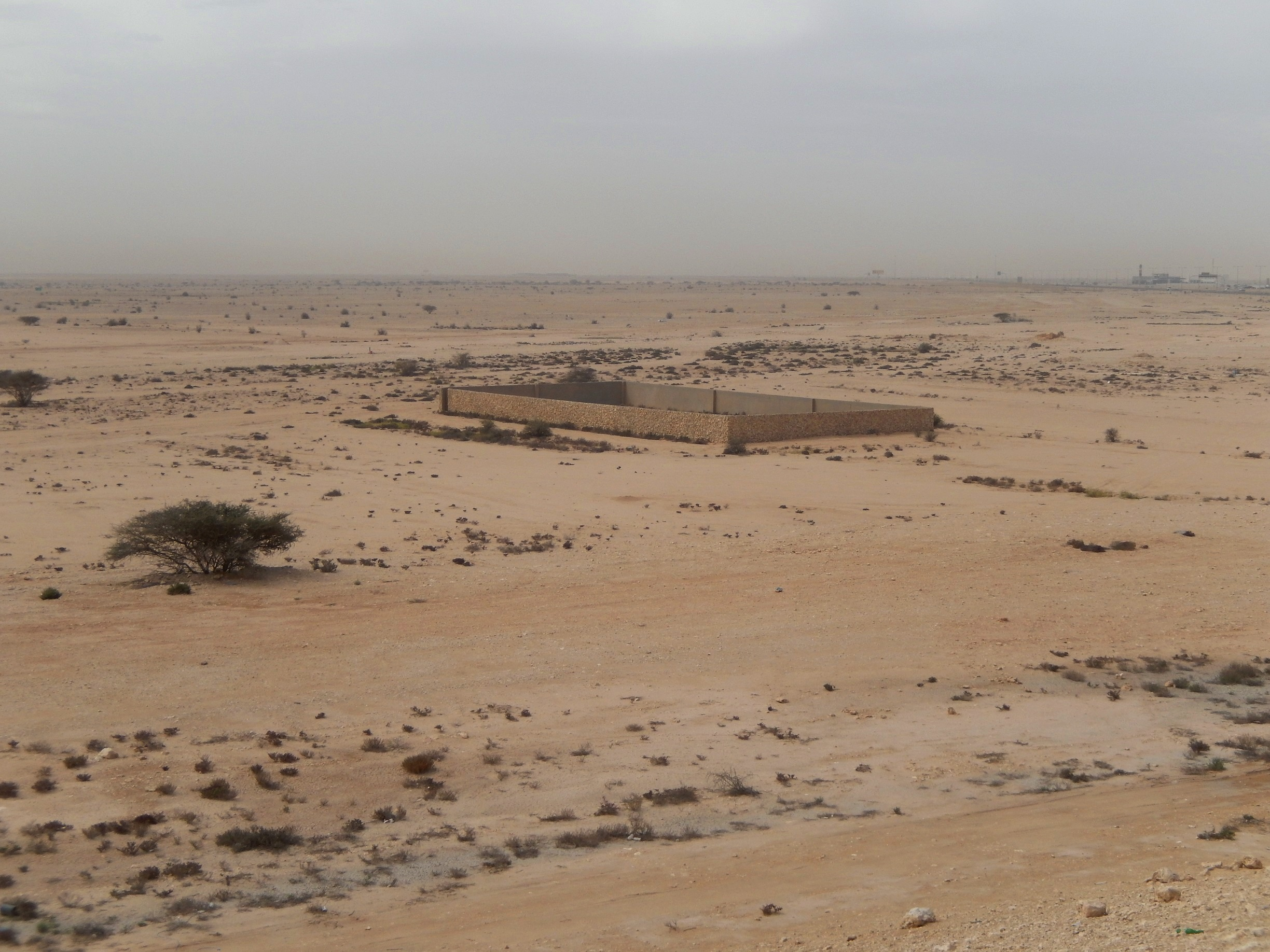
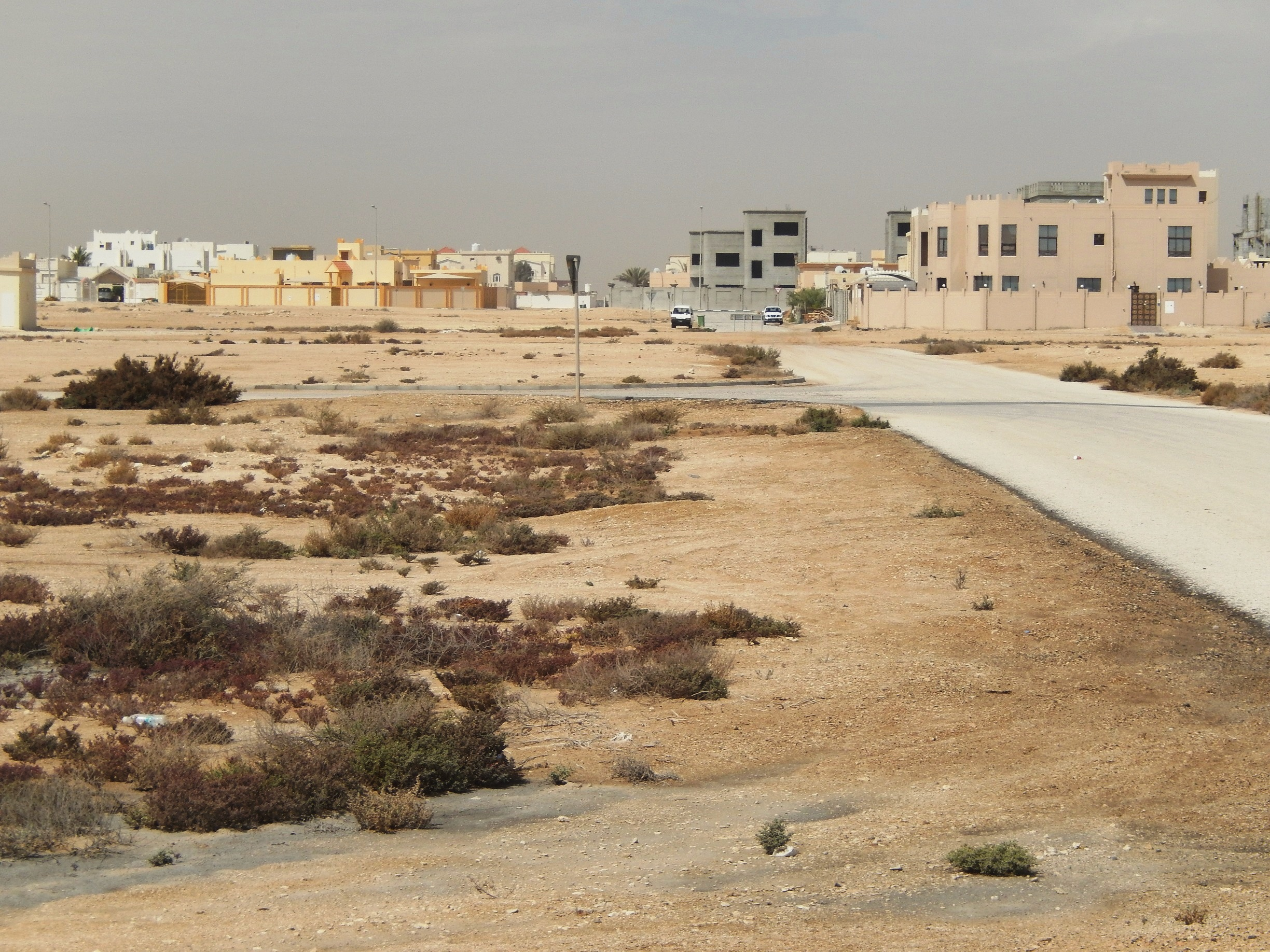
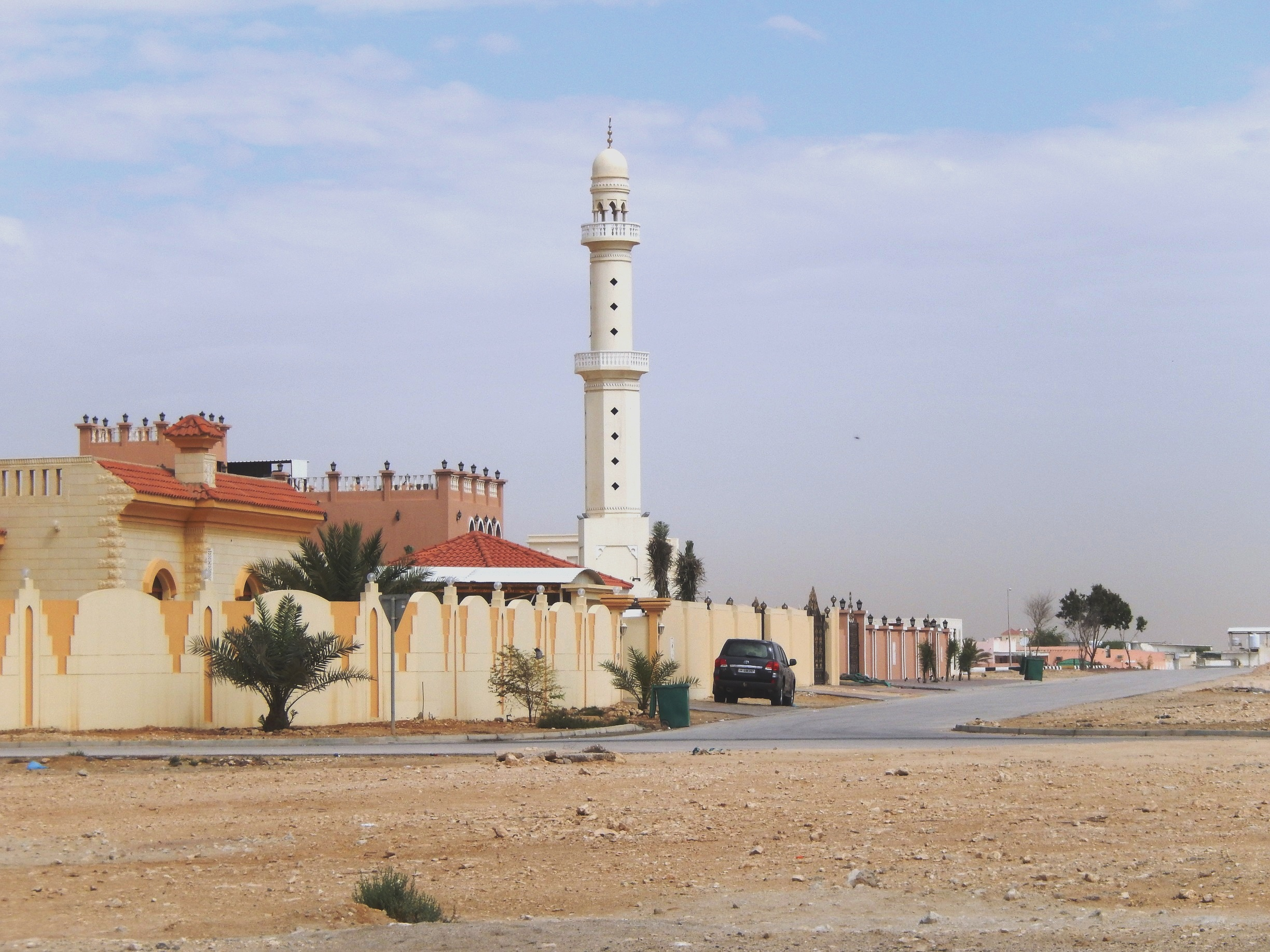
- Top to Bottom, Left to Right: Far view of Simaisma's coastline, Overhead view of the landscape surrounding Simaisma, Light roadside vegetation in a residential area, Mosque minaret standing out in a residential area

- Location within Qatar
- Coordinates: 25°34′29″N 51°29′11″E
- Country: Qatar
- Municipality: Al Khor
- Zone: Zone 74
- District no.: 269

Area
  - Total: 6.6 km^{2} (2.5 sq mi)

Simaisma (Arabic: سُمَيْسِمَة; also spelled Sumaysimah) is a small seaside town located on the eastern coast of Qatar 30 km north of the capital Doha. The town features old houses and mosques from the days before the discovery of oil and natural gas in Qatar.

It was demarcated in 1988. Small clusters of mangroves dot its coastline. Geographically, it is located in the municipality of Al Daayen, but administratively, it is a part of Al Khor.

== Etymology ==
Simaisma is believed to derive from the diminutive form of the Arabic word simsim (سمسم), meaning "sesame". The term refers to the small sandy mounds constituting the area's natural landscape.

== History ==
Simaisma was the location of a battle fought in 1768 between Sheikh Mohammed bin Khalifa Al Khalifa, chief of Zubarah, and the Musallam clan who were based at Freiha. The cause of the Battle of Simaisma was Sheikh Mohammed's refusal to pay taxes to the Al Musallam after he built the fort of Qal'at Murair. The Al Musallam were defeated and soon their power waned as a result of this devastation.

J.G. Lorimer's Gazetteer of the Persian Gulf gives an account of Simaisma in 1908:

A walled village on the east coast of Qatar, situated at the bottom of a small bay about midway between Lusail and Al Khor. One mile east of it, at the southern point of the same bay, is the village of Al Daayen, with which it is intimately connected. Sumaismah is inhabited by about 250 families of the Al Bu Kuwarah [Kuwari] tribe, and there are also a few Kibisah [Qubaisi]. There are 50 pearl boats [manned by 600 men] here, also 10 other sea-going vessels and 10 fishing boats. Livestock include 6 horses and 70 camels. Drinking water is obtained from the wells of 'Awainat Bin-Husain, 4 miles to the westward: near the village there is also a small well called Khariqat Sumaismah, but its water is bitter.

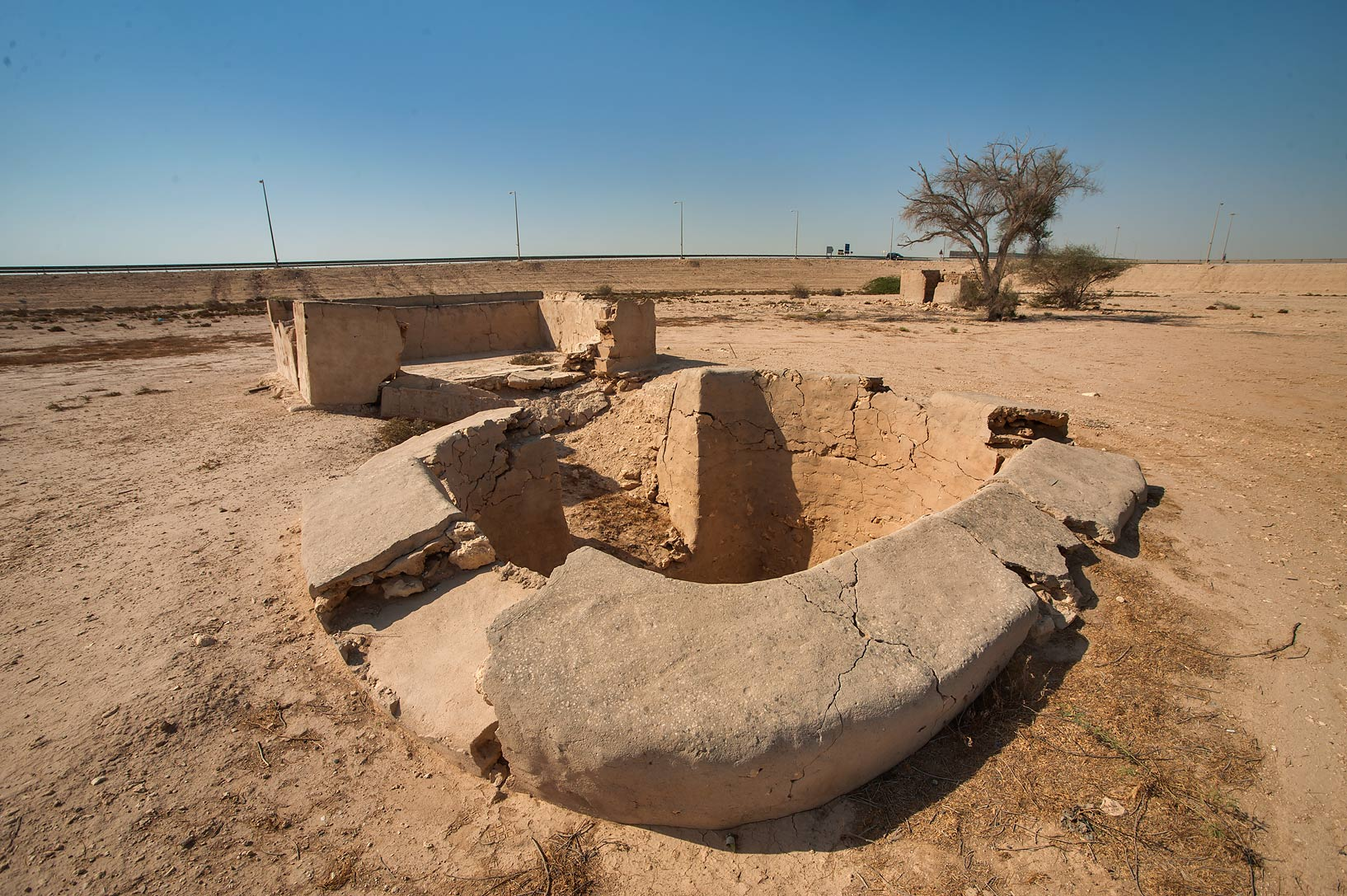
The historic Uwaynat bin Hussain water well near Simaisma.

In an earlier 1904 transcript of Lorimer's Gazetteer, he remarks that in 1883, Sheikh Jassim bin Mohammed Al Thani "wished, or pretended he wished, to settle here".

One of the town's landmarks is Simaisma Mosque, constructed in 1938. It is one of the oldest surviving mosques in Qatar. Aside from its minaret and prayer room, it also housed a madrasa, which provided Islamic instruction to young students.

The historic practice of date syrup manufacturing, using a traditional date press called madbasa, was well-established in Simaisma, where they were known as al amara. However, as Qatar rapidly modernized throughout the 1950s and 1960s, many of these date presses have been abandoned or destroyed, with few remaining.

== Geography ==
Simaisma is situated on the eastern coast of Qatar. It forms the northernmost extension of the southern sector of Qatar's interior plain region. The area around Simaisma, as part of this southern sector, has a generally flat surface that gradually increases in elevation from towards the south and west, with heights ranging between 11 metres (36 ft) to 41 metres (135 ft). Common vegetation found in Simaisma include mature shrubs of the Taverniera genus including aelijaan (Taverniera spartea) and dahseer (Taverniera aegyptiaca).

== Attractions ==
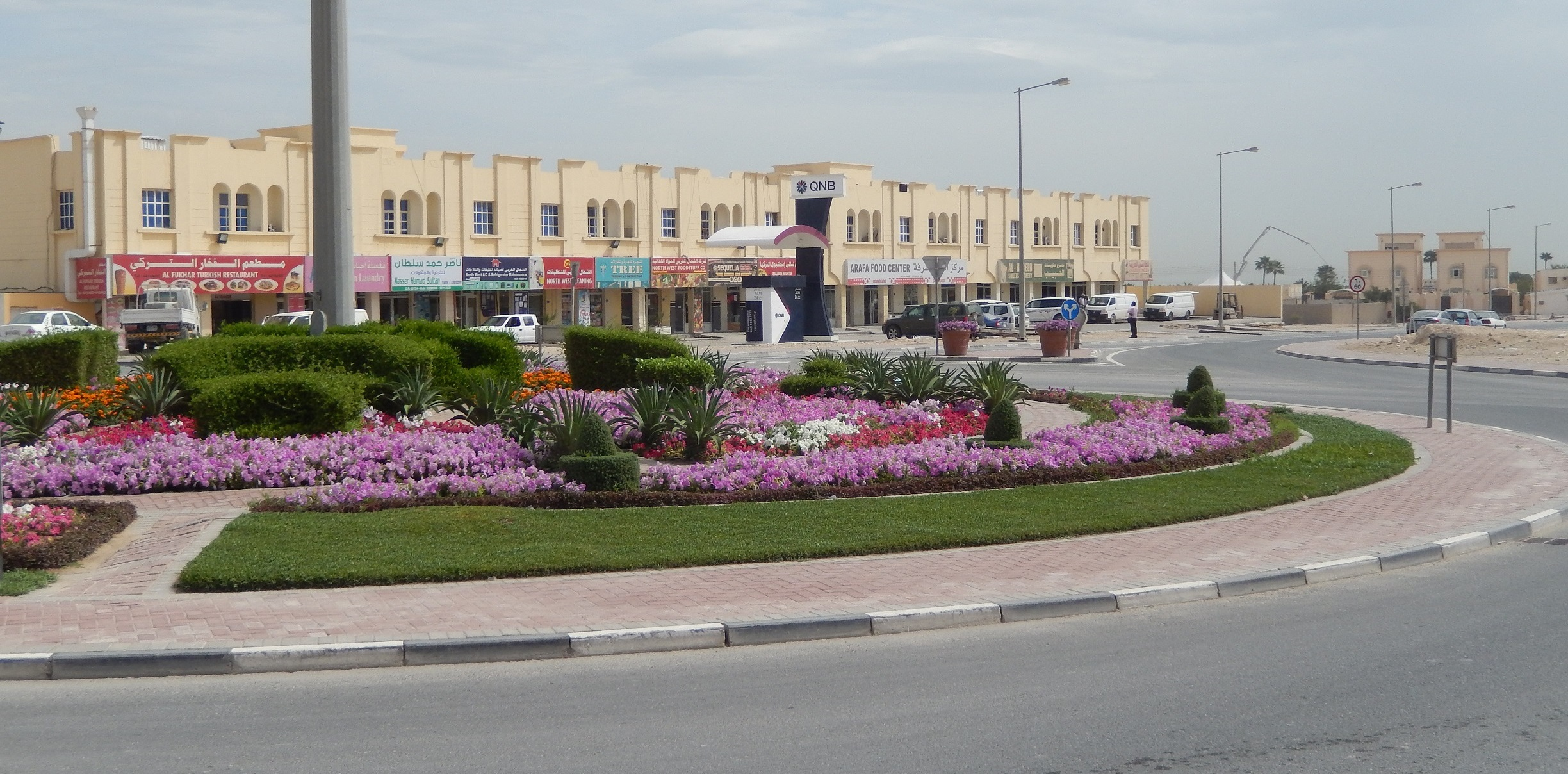
A roundabout with shops.

=== Simaisma Beach ===
Known for its idyllic landscape, Simaisma Beach is a popular domestic tourist attraction. It is closely situated to the Al Simaisma Family Park and extends for a length of roughly 1 km. Dozens shaded lounging areas are offered to visitors. Roughly 39 hectares of mangroves are found just off the coast.

In May 2025, it was announced that the beach would be closed for an approximate duration of 5 years due to the ongoing tourism development project, which includes an outdoor air conditioning system for the beach.

=== Parks ===
Simaisma Family Park was established in 1991 over an area 5,099 m². Features of the park include a basketball court, football field and a playground. Landscaping consists of 11 species of seasonal shrubs and flowers, as well as three different species of palm trees.

Simaisma Olympic Park was opened in June 2012. Many facilities are found in the park, such as a football pitch, swimming pool, mosque, cafe and youth centre.

=== Simaisma Resort ===
Murwab Hotel Group launched Simaisma Resort in February 2016. The resort has 52 villas and 4 restaurants.

=== Simaisma Youth Centre ===
Simaisma has a youth centre, founded in November 2007 and formally inaugurated in June 2008. Its Kashta exhibition opened on 18 October 2014. The exhibition showcases materials related to heritage, folk crafts and camping.

=== Al Qarn House ===
Al Qarn House is a historic residence constructed on the beach in the 1950s by Sheikh Fahad bin Mohammed bin Thani Al Thani. Traditional building materials were used in its construction, including sea rocks used in the walls, and bamboo and mangrove poles used for structural support. In September 2023, the Department of Architectural Conservation completed its restoration of the residence.

=== Simaisma Development Project ===
In June 2024, Qatar’s Ministry of Municipality announced the launch of the Simaisma Development Project, a large-scale tourism and real estate initiative aimed at transforming the area into a modern destination for leisure, investment, and sustainable growth. Spanning over 8 million square meters and featuring a 7‑kilometer beachfront along Qatar’s eastern coast, the development includes plans for a luxury golf course, a 650,000 m² theme park, a yacht marina, luxury resorts, and residential villas. The project is aligned with the Qatar National Development Strategy 2024–2030 and is being implemented by Qatari Diar Real Estate Investment Company.

== Transport ==
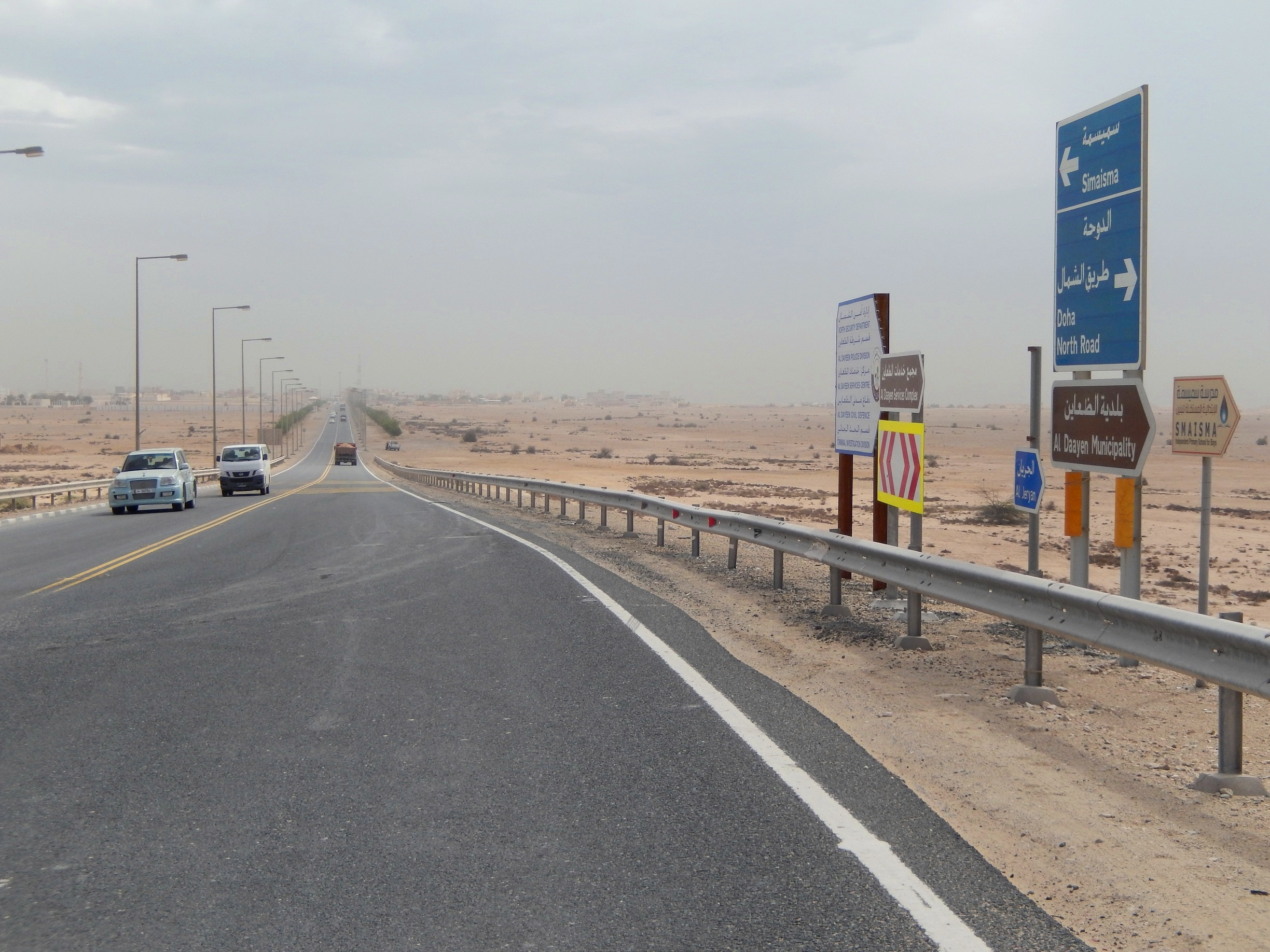
The main highway to Simaisma.

Simaisma is connected to the main highway in the municipality through Simaisma Road, a 7 kilometres (4.3 mi) carriageway. There is no public transport in the town.

The Simaisma Island Bridge is a 450 meter-long bridge connecting Simaisma's mainland to Simaisma Island.

== Education ==
The town's first formal school for boys was opened in 1957. One year later, a school for girls was opened. Simaisma's public schools only provide primary education. Students typically continue their secondary education in Al Khor.

== Sports ==
Simaisma hosted the first point of the final stage of the Tour of Al Zubarah in December 2015. It also hosted part of the second stage of the 2016 Tour of Qatar.

A small football stadium is located in the town which serves its amateur football team. Simaisma FC won the non-professional Al Frjan League two times in a row in 2013 and 2014.

== Archaeology ==
Plaster vessels designed to resemble Ubaid pottery were found in Simaisma through an archaeological expedition. Also found in the town were two circular burial mounds dating to the 5th century B.C., the earliest burial sites discovered in Qatar.
