= Zone 75, Qatar =

Zone 75
- Zone
- Interactive map of Zone 75
- Coordinates: 25.829161°N 51.469241°E
- Country: Qatar
- Municipality: Al Khor
- Blocks: 124

Area
  - Total: 610.8 km^{2} (235.8 sq mi)

Population
  - Total: 100,118 (2,015)
- Time zone: UTC+03 (Arabia Standard Time)
- ISO 3166 code: QA-KH

Zone 75 is a zone of the municipality of Al Khor and Al Thakhira in Qatar. The main districts recorded in the 2015 population census were Al Thakhira, Ras Laffan, and Umm Birka.

Other districts which fall within the municipality's administrative boundaries are Al Waab, Umm Al Hawaya, Umm Al Qahab, Umm Ethnaitain, Wadi Al Harm, and Waab Al Mashrab.

== Demographics ==
Year	Population
1986	1,932
1997	7,534
2004	10,524
2010	129773
2015	100,118

== Land use ==
The Ministry of Municipality and Environment (MME) breaks down land use in the zone as follows.

Area (km^{2})	Developed land (km^{2})	Undeveloped land (km^{2})	Residential (km^{2})	Commercial/ Industrial (km^{2})	Education/ Health (km^{2})	Farming/ Green areas (km^{2})	Other uses (km^{2})
610.82	86.16	524.66	2.05	0.5	0.15	51.33	32.13
