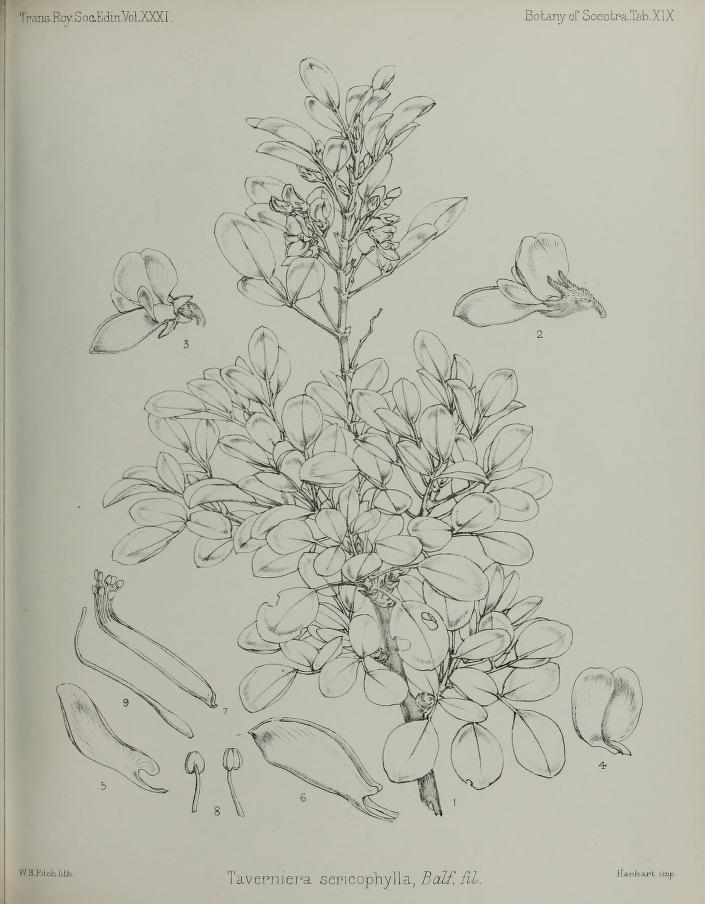

Conservation status
- Vulnerable (IUCN 3.1)

Scientific classification
- Kingdom: Plantae
- Clade: Tracheophytes
- Clade: Angiosperms
- Clade: Eudicots
- Clade: Rosids
- Order: Fabales
- Family: Fabaceae
- Subfamily: Faboideae
- Genus: Taverniera
- Species: T. sericophylla

Binomial name
- Taverniera sericophylla Balf.f.

= Taverniera sericophylla =

Species of plant

Taverniera sericophylla is a species of legume in the family Fabaceae. Found only in Socotra, the legume's natural habitat is subtropical or tropical dry shrubland. The species is threatened by habitat loss.
