= Umm Birka =

Umm Birka أُمّ بِرْكَة
- Location within Qatar
- Coordinates: 25°45′00″N 51°26′59″E
- Country: Qatar
- Municipality: Al Khor
- Zone: Zone 75
- District no.: 310

Area
  - Total: 58.5 km^{2} (22.6 sq mi)

Umm Birka (Arabic: أُمّ بِرْكَة; also spelled Umm Baraka) is a settlement in the Al Khor municipality of Qatar.

== Etymology ==
Umm Birka derives its name from the Arabic word barikat, which means "blessing". It was named in reference to a local depression that would fill with water during the rainy season.

== History ==
Historically, during the winter months, residents of nearby towns such as Al Thakhira and Al Khor traveled to Umm Birka to graze their livestock and collect wild grasses due to its relative abundance of vegetation. This included species such as samma (Stipellula capensis), daqiqah (Tripleurospermum auriculatum), and thumam (Panicum turgidum), which were valued for their suitability as fodder.

== Geography ==
Umm Birka is situated in northeast Qatar. The village of Umm Al Qahab is nearby.

== Water reservoir ==
The settlement is one of five sites for the government-sponsored project to develop reservoirs in the country. Once completed, the reservoirs are expected to be the largest in the world in their category, with a total length of 650 km and constructed at a cost of QR 14.5 billion. In June 2018, the first phase of the project was completed.
