= Umm Al Qahab =

Umm Al Qahab أم القهاب
- Village
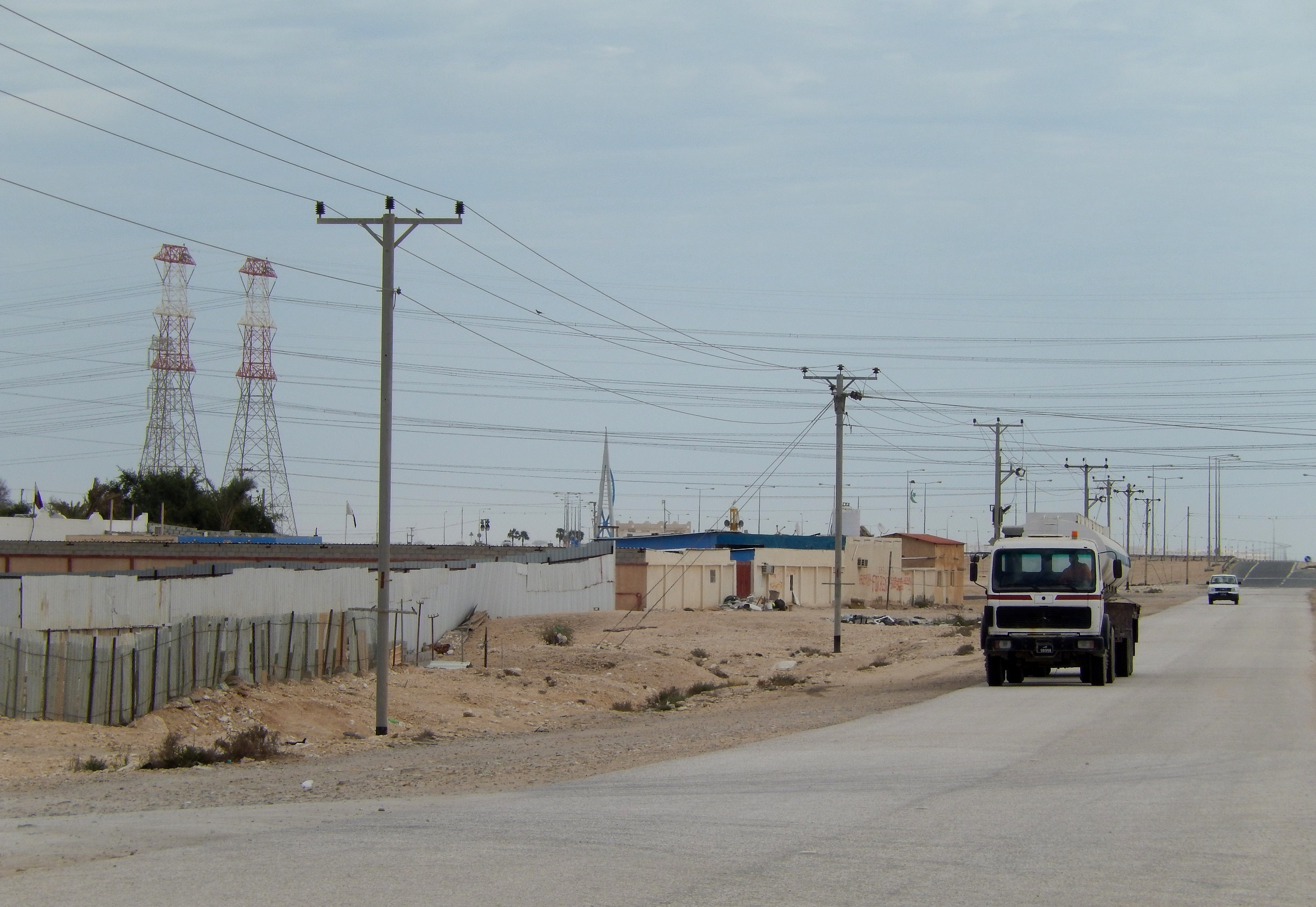
- Road in Umm Al Qahab dominated by power lines

- Location in Qatar
- Coordinates: 25.762781°N 51.466415°E
- Country: Qatar
- Municipality: Al Khor
- Zone: Zone 75

Umm Al Qahab (Arabic: أم القهاب) is a village in western Qatar located in the municipality of Al Khor. The village lies close to Umm Birka. It is one of many scattered villages to the north-west of Al Thakhira.

== Etymology ==
In Arabic, umm means "mother" and is commonly attached as a prefix to geographic features. The second word, qahab, is a local term used for white and light grey hills, of which there are a number found in this area.

Alternative transliterations of its name are Umm Al Gahab and Umm Al Quhab.

== Geography ==
Umm Al Qahab is situated in Qatar's northeast region. It forms part of the eastern boundary of the southern section of the interior plain region. The area is characterized by relatively flat terrain with some undulations.

== Historical landmarks ==
=== Umm Al Qahab Mosque ===
The Umm Al Qahab Mosque was erected in 1945, when the surrounding area had a more substantial population. Over the years, various structural modifications have been made, including adding a roof over the open iwan, carpeting the floors, and updating the ablution facilities, which significantly altered the mosque's initial architectural character.

The dimensions of the mosque are approximately 10 by 14.28 meters. The main entrance is situated on the east wall, in proximity to the nearby houses. Adjacent to the entrance, an open iwan with an iron frame has been appended. Much of the original courtyard and the once open iwan, measuring 3.40 by 9.36 meters, have been converted into an enclosed iwan, now measuring 5.40 by 9.60 meters, with a roof made of corrugated metal. The cement flooring has been overlaid with carpeting. The qibla is positioned in the northeast corner of the mosque, left of the entrance. The ablution facilities and lavatories are positioned at the end of the courtyard, which has been diminished to a narrow passageway, merely two meters wide, in the southeast corner due to the construction of the enclosed iwan. The roof has also been replaced with corrugated metal sheets. The mihrab is semi-circular, featuring an aperture for light on either side and topped with a semi-circular dome. Portions of the external walls remain visibly covered in concrete.

The minaret, the mosque's oldest component, has retained most of its original features. It is situated on a square foundation that includes an entryway to a staircase. This square base reaches the same height as the mosque's outer wall. The minaret itself consists of a cylindrical shaft topped with a dome supported by six columns, each 2.39 meters in height. The columns are coated with mortar. The staircase ascending the minaret is also constructed in the traditional style, although the exterior of the tower is now clad in cement.
