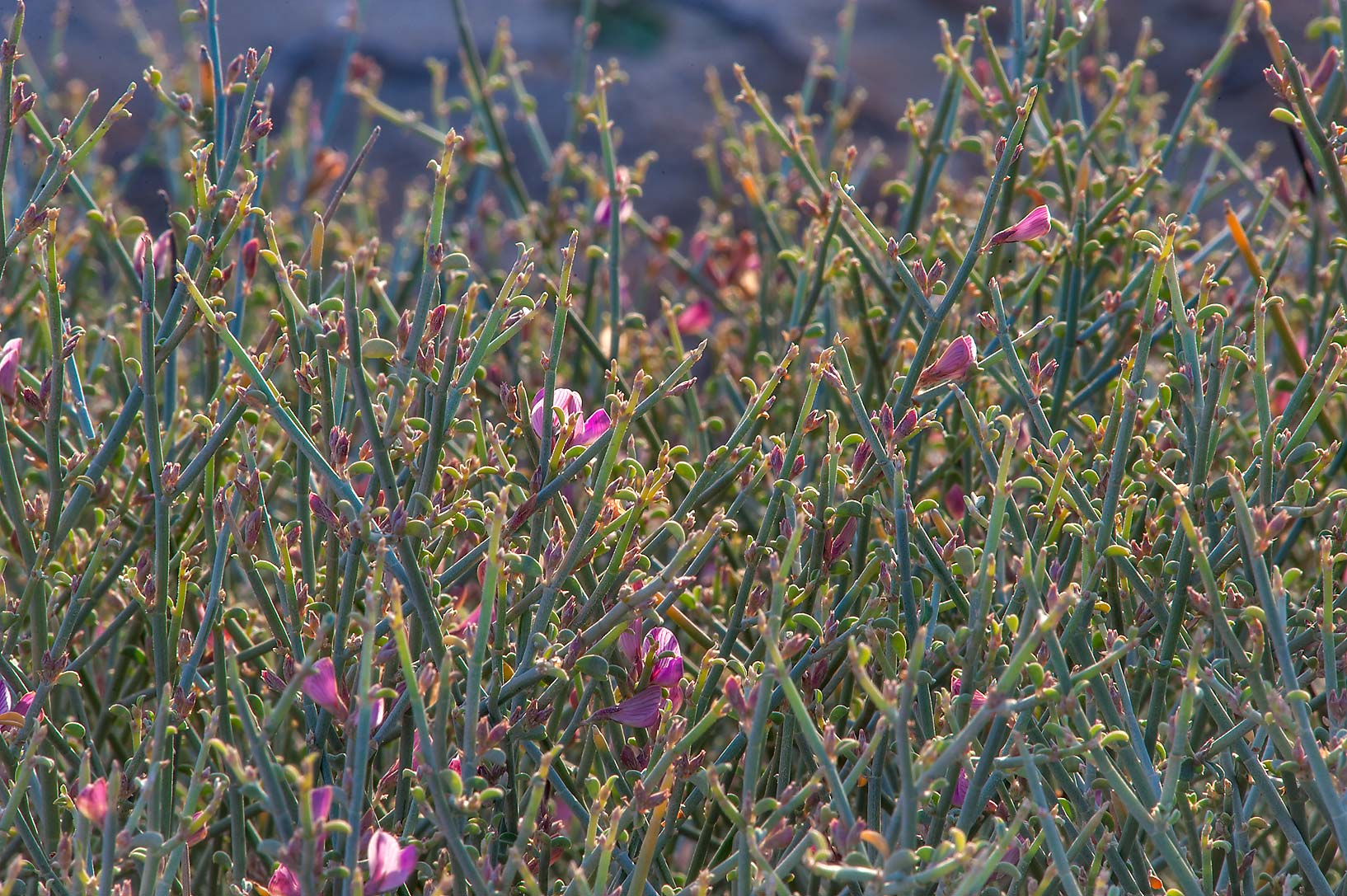
- Taverniera spartea flowers in Qatar

Scientific classification
- Kingdom: Plantae
- Clade: Tracheophytes
- Clade: Angiosperms
- Clade: Eudicots
- Clade: Rosids
- Order: Fabales
- Family: Fabaceae
- Subfamily: Faboideae
- Genus: Taverniera
- Species: T. spartea

Binomial name
- Taverniera spartea DC.

Synonyms
- Hedysarum spartium Burm.f.; Taverniera gonoclada Jaub. & Spach; Taverniera incana Boiss.; Taverniera spartium (Burm.f.) Druce

= Taverniera spartea =

Species of plant

Taverniera spartea is a perennial leguminous shrub native to arid regions stretching from the Arabian Peninsula through Iran to Pakistan. It thrives in sandy or rocky deserts and dry shrublands. It is a small, silky shrub with reduced or absent trifoliate leaves, pink to pale purple flowers, and spiny, segmented fruits.

== Description ==
Taverniera spartea is a perennial shrub ranging in height from 45 to 120 centimeters. The plant exhibits a white, silky indumentum across its surfaces. Leaves are typically palmately trifoliolate, though often reduced to a single leaflet or absent. Leaflets, when present, measure approximately 10 mm or less in length and about 8 mm in width, with entire margins.

The inflorescence takes the form of an axillary raceme bearing one to three flowers. The peduncle measures 1–2 mm in length and is sericeous, as are the individual pedicels, which are 1–1.5 mm long. The corolla is pink to pale purple, marked with dark purple veins. The standard petal measures 9–10 mm in length and exceeds the length of the keel petals. The fruit is a segmented lomentum containing one to two seeds; individual segments are 6–8 mm long and 4.5–5 mm wide. Fruit appendages range from glabrous to subglabrous.

== Distribution and habitat ==
This species is confirmed to be native to countries across the Persian Gulf region, particularly the Gulf States, Iran, and Pakistan, and it thrives in desert and dry shrubland biomes. In Qatar, where it is known as aelijaan and daheer, it has been frequently documented occupying sandy and rocky substrates.

== Ecology ==
Its growth exhibits a seasonal cycle, initiating in late November and slowing by late May.
