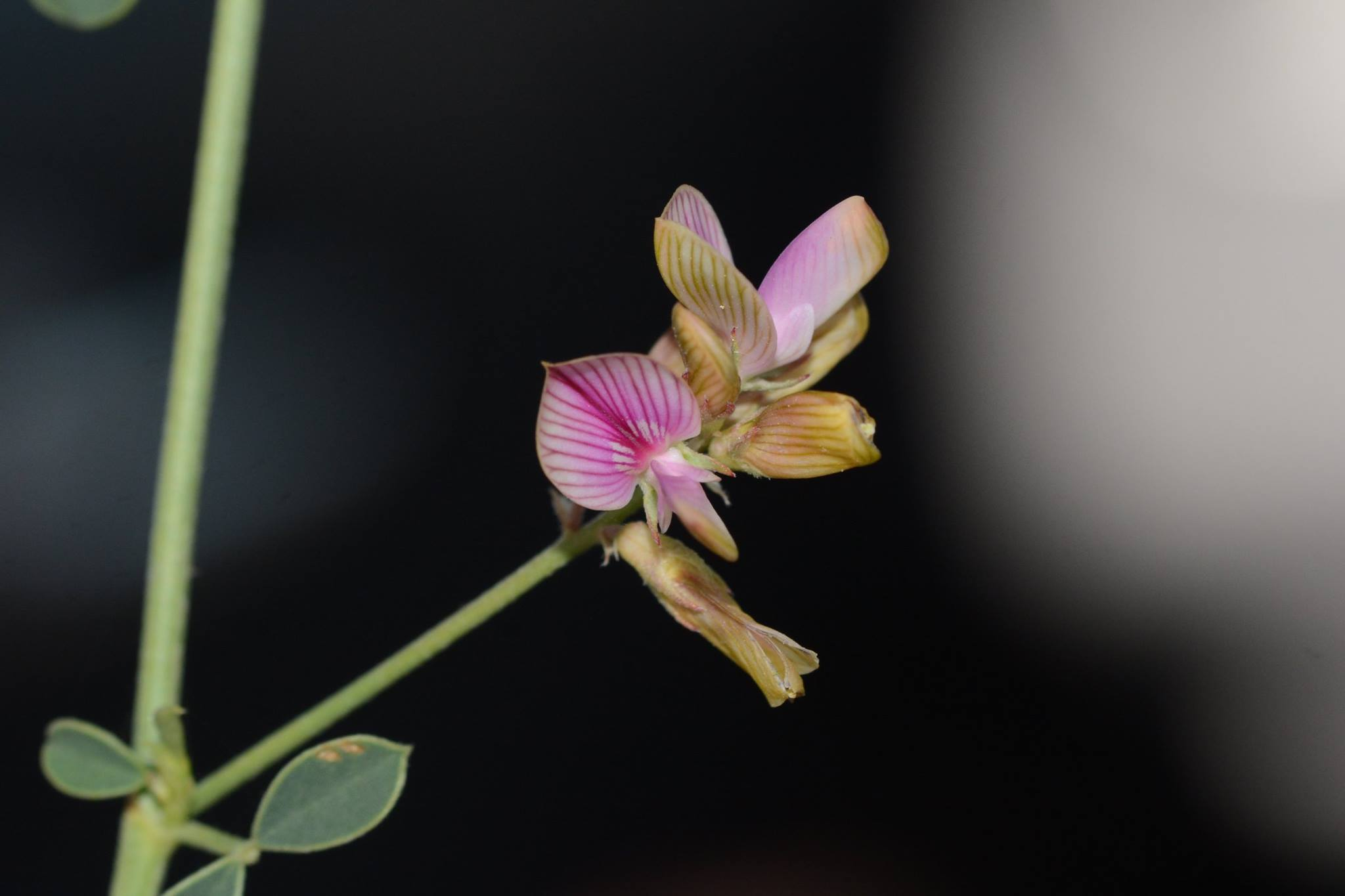
- Taverniera cuneifolia in India

Scientific classification
- Kingdom: Plantae
- Clade: Tracheophytes
- Clade: Angiosperms
- Clade: Eudicots
- Clade: Rosids
- Order: Fabales
- Family: Fabaceae
- Subfamily: Faboideae
- Tribe: Hedysareae
- Genus: Taverniera; DC.

Species
- See text.

= Taverniera =

Genus of legumes

Taverniera is a genus of legume in the family Fabaceae. It includes 17 species of shrubs or shrublets which range from Egypt eastwards to the Arabian Peninsula, Iraq, Iran, Pakistan, and India, and southwards to Ethiopia and Somalia. Typical habitats include seasonally-dry tropical and subtropical desert, shrubland, and bushland.

== Species ==
As of April 2023, Plants of the World Online accepted the following species:

- Taverniera abyssinica A.Rich. – Ethiopia
- Taverniera aegyptiaca Boiss.
- Taverniera albida Thulin
- Taverniera brevialata Thulin
- Taverniera cuneifolia (Roth) Arn.
- Taverniera diffusa (Cambess.) Thulin
- Taverniera echinata Mozaff.
- Taverniera glabra Boiss.
- Taverniera glauca Edgew.
- Taverniera lappacea (Forssk.) DC.
- Taverniera longisetosa Thulin
- Taverniera multinoda Thulin
- Taverniera nummularia DC.
- Taverniera oligantha (Franch.) Thulin
- Taverniera schimperi Jaub. & Spach
- Taverniera sericophylla Balf.f. – Yemen
- Taverniera spartea DC.
