= Taverniera aegyptiaca =

Scientific classification
- Kingdom: Plantae
- Clade: Tracheophytes
- Clade: Angiosperms
- Clade: Eudicots
- Clade: Rosids
- Order: Fabales
- Family: Fabaceae
- Subfamily: Faboideae
- Genus: Taverniera
- Species: T. aegyptiaca

Binomial name
- Taverniera aegyptiaca Boiss.

Species of plant

Taverniera aegyptiaca is a subshrub or shrub in the legume family, native to arid regions from Egypt and Eritrea through the Arabian Peninsula to Sudan and South Sudan.

== Description ==
Taverniera aegyptiaca is a small, well-branched shrub ranging from 30 to 75 cm tall, with a generally green appearance. It commonly flowers between March and April. The plant is characterized by its small, deciduous leaves, and its dark purple flowers, which become paper-like in texture and enclose the segmented fruit. The fruit is a small, tuberculous pod that is segmented.

== Distribution and habitat ==
Taverniera aegyptiaca occurs naturally in Egypt, Eritrea, Saudi Arabia, Sudan, and across the Arabian Peninsula, thriving in desert and dry shrubland biomes. In Qatar, it is locally frequent in the northeast in sandy and compact soils, typically near the coast. It is adapted to sub-saline, sandy-clayey soils.

== Ecology ==
It is commonly used as fodder, and is noted for its year‑round palatability to sheep and goats.
