= Flora of Qatar =

Includes more than 300 species of wild plants

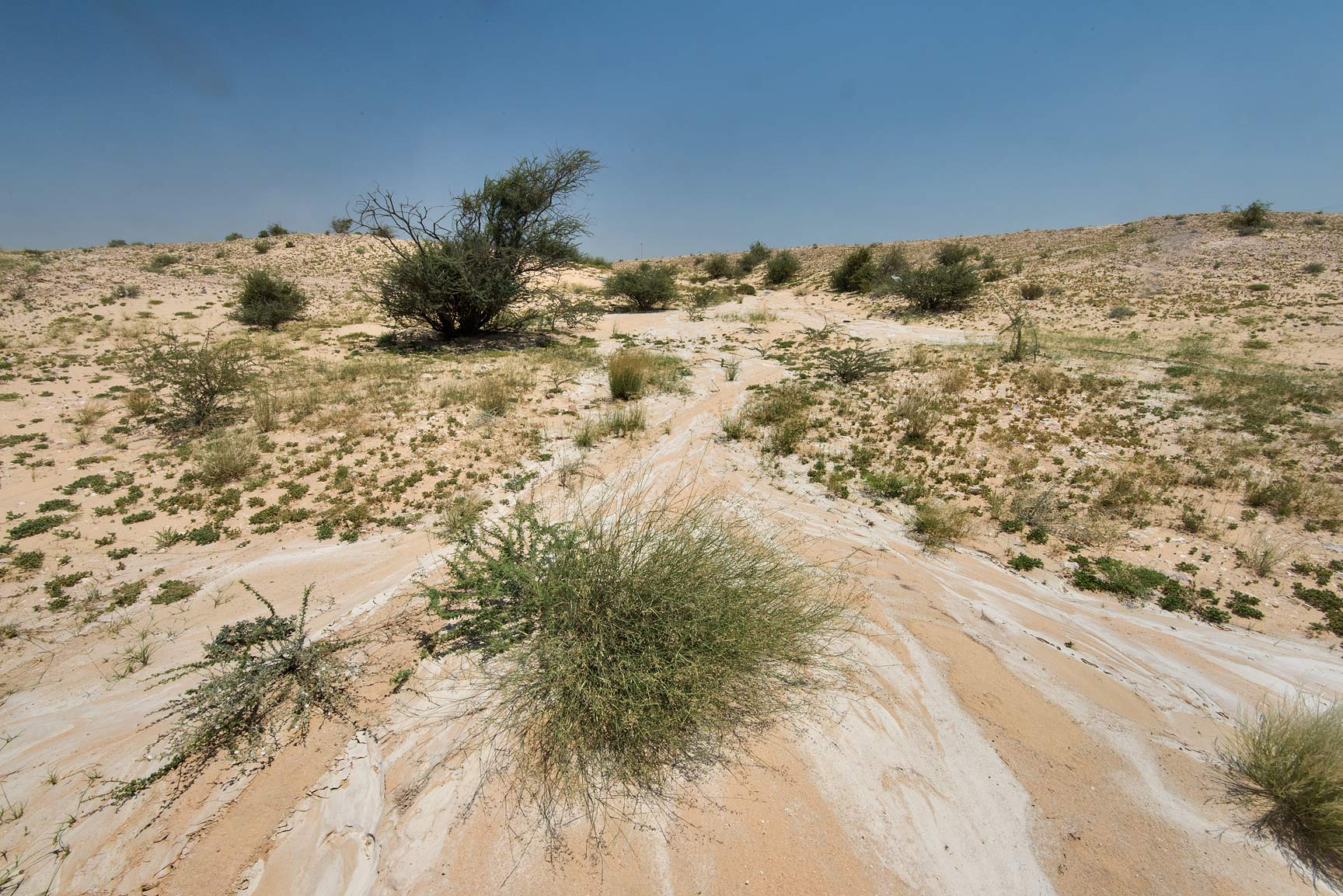
Panicum turgidum in a wadi near Mukaynis, Qatar

The flora of Qatar includes more than 300 species of wild plants. Qatar occupies a small desert peninsula that is around 80 km (50 miles) from east to west and 160 km (100 miles) from north to south. The climate is hot and humid with sporadic rain. Majority of the country is flat with an annual rainfall average of less than 3 inches. Arnebia hispidissim blooms yellow flowers annually in sandy soil. Glossonema edule has edible fruits with brownish-yellow flowers.

Vegetation is extremely sparse in the hamada landscape due to the heavily weathered soil. A native species of tree, Vachellia tortilis (known locally as samr) is well adapted to the desert environment and one of the most common forms of vegetation in the country. Zygophyllum qatarense and Lycium shawii also grow in this landscape.

Shallow depressions referred to as rawdat constitute a more varied selection of plants since rainwater run-off is more likely to accumulate. Ziziphus nummularia favors deeper soil in this type of habitat, whereas the grass Cymbopogon parkeri is found in shallower soils. In the south of the peninsula, where groundwater is scarce, Panicum turgidum and V. tortilis grow in the wind-blown soils. Vegetative distribution in the south is mostly concentrated in rawdas and in wadis fed by run-off from nearby hills. There are many other flowers species available now in Qatar for consumer purpose.

== Habitats ==
=== Sabkhas ===
Sabkhas, or salt flats, are a common habitat type in Qatar, largely due to the country’s proximity to the sea. These saline depressions occur primarily along the coast, though inland sabkhas are also present, such as the extensive Dukhan Sabkha. Sabkhas may appear either barren or sparsely vegetated, with vegetation determined largely by the level of soil salinity.

Inland sabkhas, particularly those subject to both high salinity and arid conditions, exhibit limited plant diversity and sparse coverage. Species in these regions include Zygophyllum qatarense, Anabasis setifera, and the grass Aeluropus lagopoides, all of which exhibit tolerance to harsh conditions but remain physiologically stressed. By contrast, coastal sabkhas beyond the extent of mangrove stands are frequently vegetated and support denser halophytic communities. Common genera include Arthrocnemum, Halocnemum, Halopeplis, and Limonium. Halopeplis and Limonium are particularly associated with elevated saline substrates that retain less surface moisture, while Arthrocnemum and Halocnemum tend to dominate in wetter conditions.

== Natural areas ==
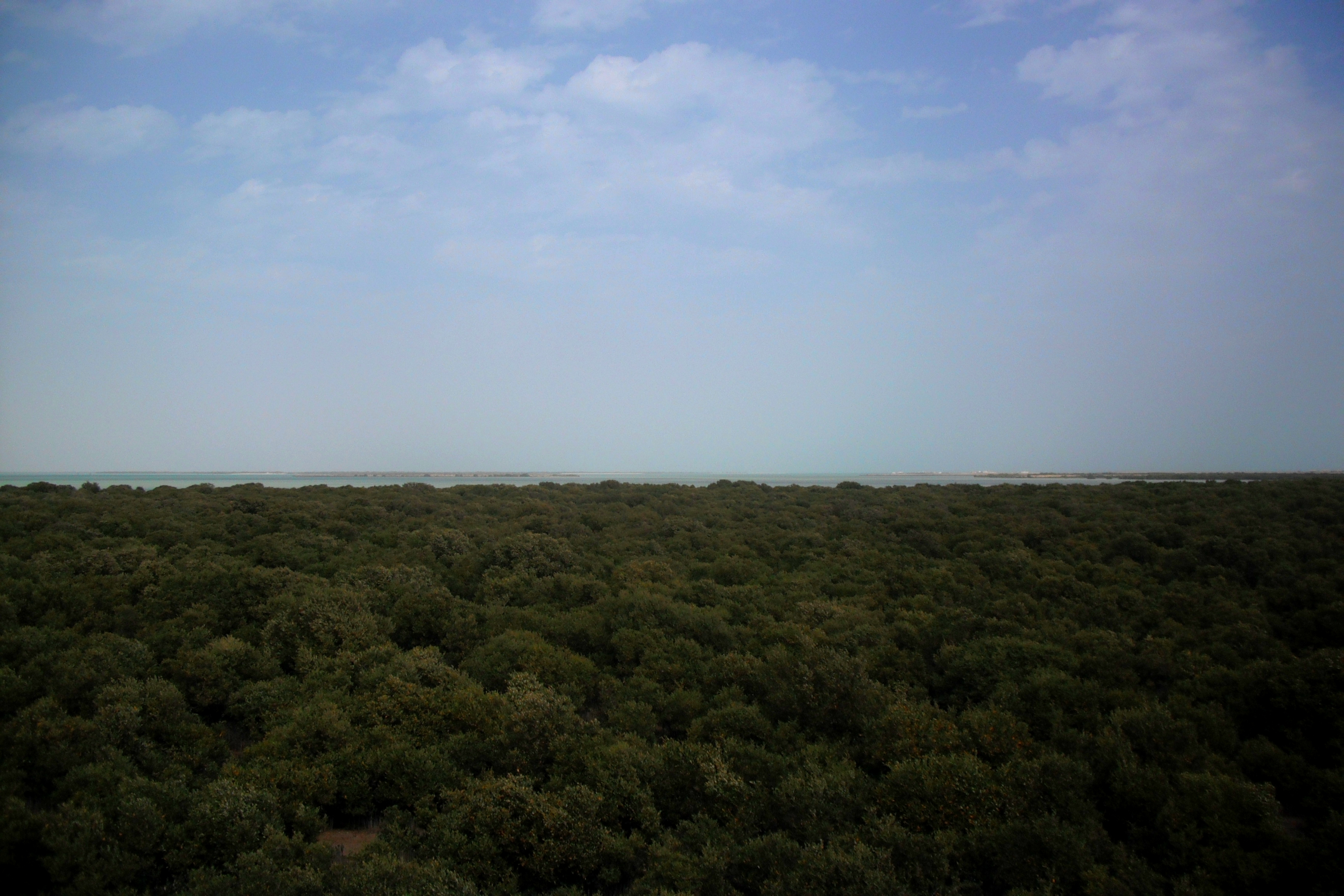
Mangroves in Al Thakhira

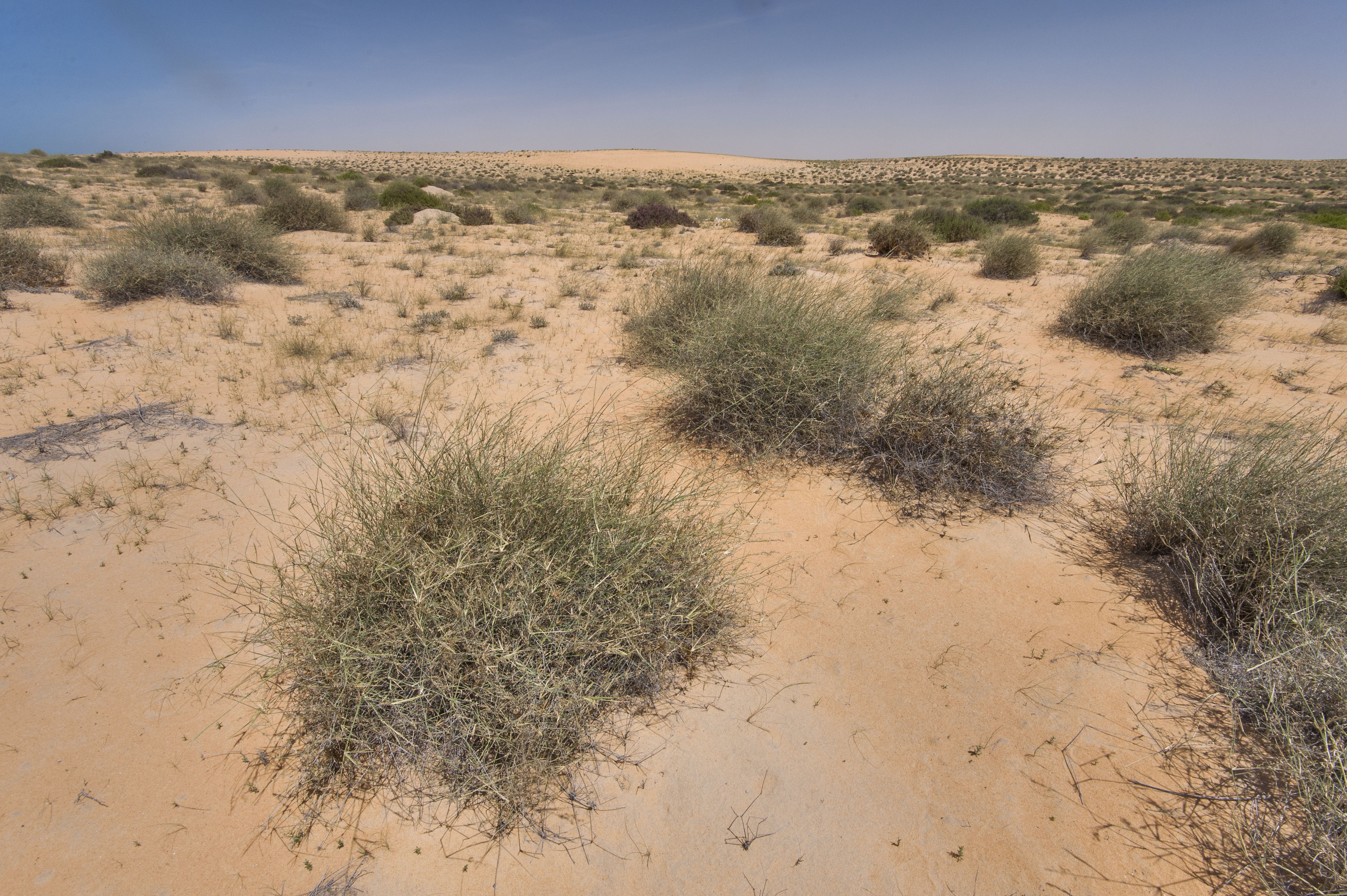
Dense clumps of Panicum turgidum growing in Al Maszhabiya reserve, southern Qatar

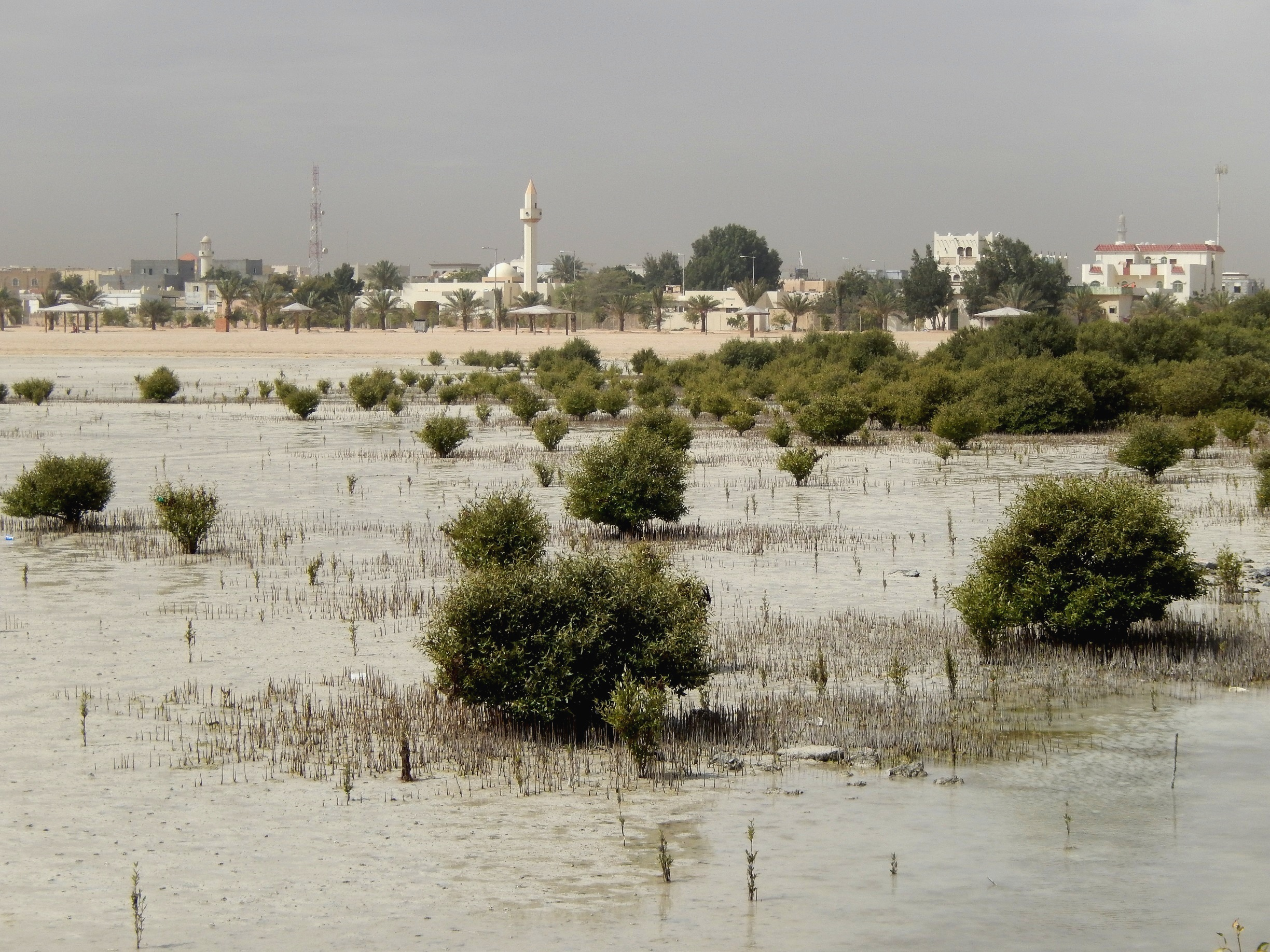
White mangroves on Qatar's eastern shore

Natural areas in Qatar include:

- Al Shahaniyah Park in Al-Shahaniya
- Al Wabra Wildlife Preservation
- Khor Al Udeid Fish Sanctuary
- Al Reem Biosphere Preserve (designated in 2007) is part of the World Network of Biosphere Reserves in the Arab States
- Ras Ushairij Gazelle Conservation Park
- Al Thakira Nature Reserve in Al Thakhira
- Khor Al Adaid Reserve in Khor Al Adaid
- Ras Abrouq Nature Reserve (also known as Bir Zekreet (Zekreet Beach) in Ras Abrouq
- Umm Tais National Park

== Taxonomy ==
=== Class: Liliopsida ===
==== Order: Poales ====
- Family: Poaceae
  - Genus: Poa
    - Poa annua (introduced)
  - Genus: Schismus
    - Schismus arabicus (native)

=== Class: Magnoliopsida ===
==== Order: Asterales ====
- Family: Asteraceae
  - Genus: Reichardia
    - Reichardia tingitana (native) (common names: huzan, mureer, and murar)
  - Genus: Rhanterium
    - Rhanterium epapposum (native) (common name: arfaj)

==== Order: Boraginales ====
- Family: Boraginaceae
  - Genus: Arnebia
    - Arnebia decumbens (native)
    - Arnebia hispidissima (native)

==== Order: Brassicales ====
- Family: Capparaceae
  - Genus: Dipterygium
    - Dipterygium glaucum (native) (common name: alqa)

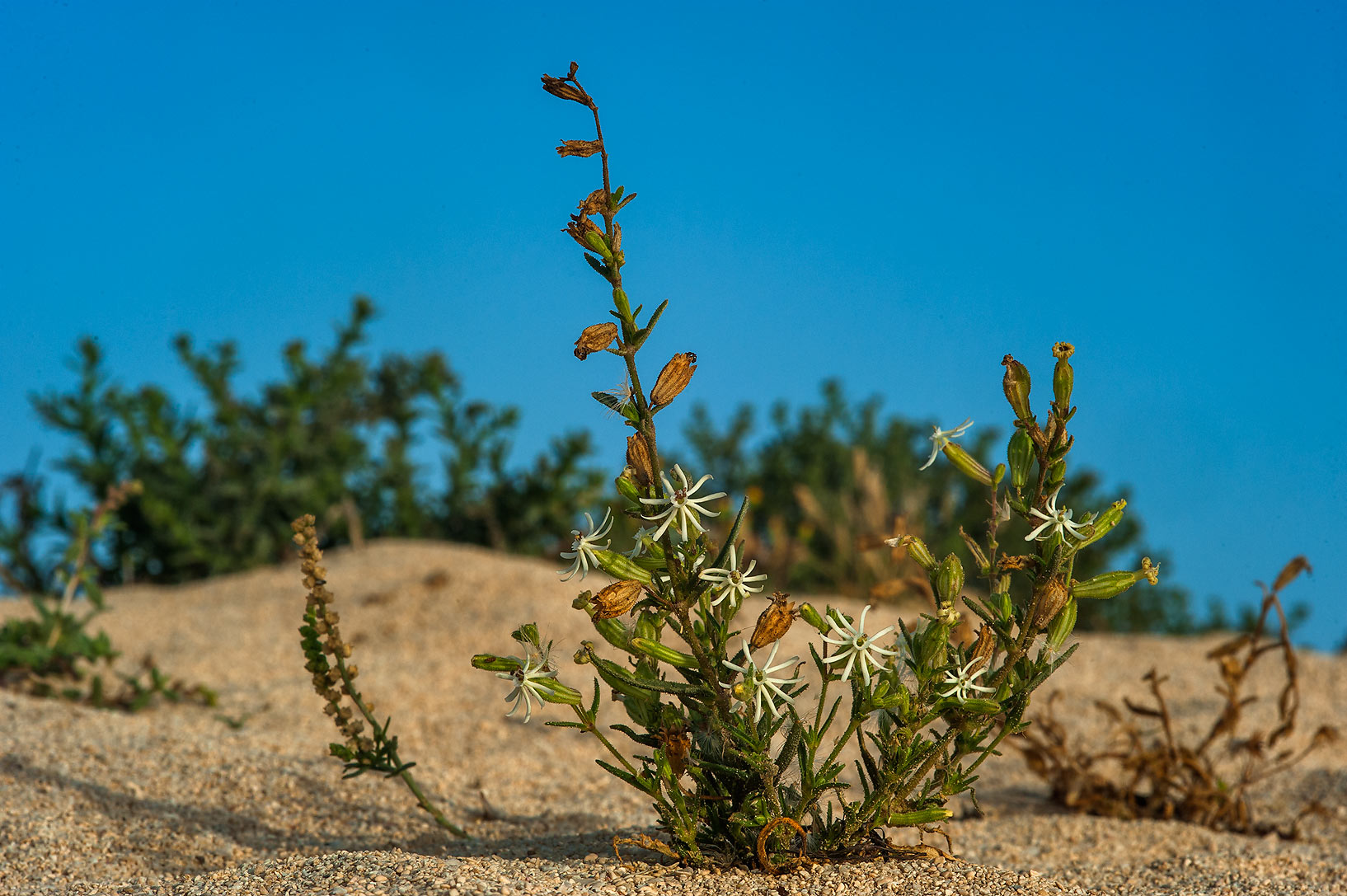
Silene arabica (local name torba) growing in Fuwayrit, northern Qatar

==== Order: Caryophyllales ====
- Family: Amaranthaceae
  - Genus: Suaeda
    - Suaeda aegyptiaca
  - Genus: Salsola
    - Salsola rosmarinus
- Family: Caryophyllaceae
  - Genus: Silene
    - Silene arabica (native) (common name: torba)
  - Genus: Vaccaria
    - Vaccaria hispanica (introduced) (common name: Arab bean)
- Family: Polygonaceae
  - Genus: Calligonum
    - Calligonum comosum (native) (common name: arta)
- Family: Tamaricaceae
  - Genus: Tamarix
    - Tamarix aucheriana (native) (common name: athl)

==== Order: Fabales ====
- Family: Fabaceae
  - Genus: Alhagi
    - Alhagi maurorum (native) (common names: alaqool, camelthorn)
  - Genus: Parkinsonia
    - Parkinsonia aculeata (introduced)
  - Genus: Senna
    - Senna occidentalis (introduced)
  - Genus: Taverniera
    - Taverniera spartea (native) (common name: aelijaan)

==== Order: Gentianales ====
- Family: Apocynaceae
  - Genus: Calotropis
    - Calotropis procera (native) (common name: ashaar)

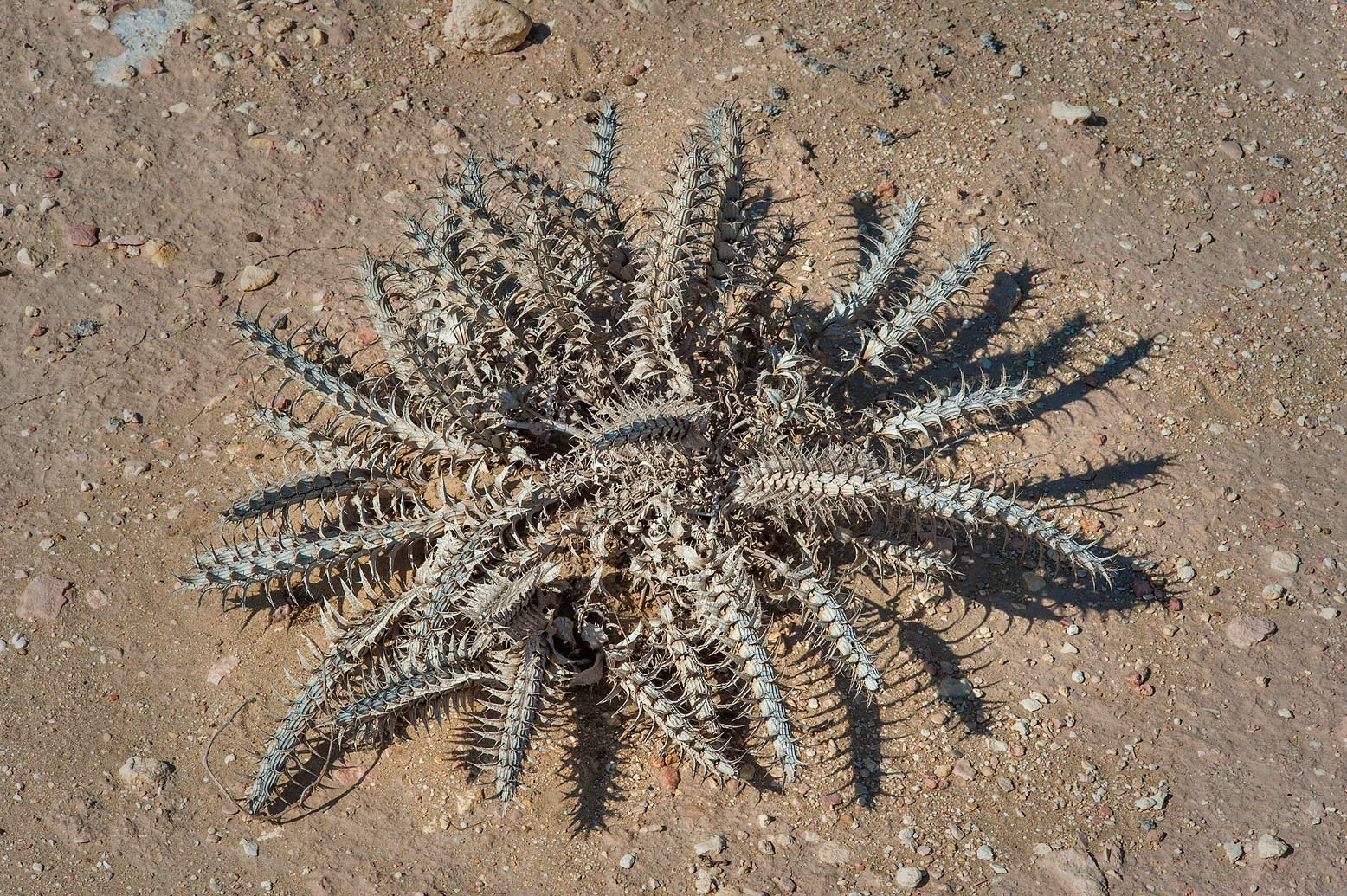
Dry eyelash plant (Blepharis ciliaris) in southern Qatar

==== Order: Lamiales ====
- Family: Acanthaceae
  - Genus: Avicennia
    - Avicennia marina (native) (common names: qurm, shoura, grey mangrove)
  - Genus: Blepharis
    - Blepharis ciliaris (native) (common names: nijaa, eyelash plant)

==== Order: Malpighiales ====
- Family: Euphorbiaceae
  - Genus: Mercurialis
    - Mercurialis annua (introduced)

==== Order: Solanales ====
- Family: Convolvulaceae
  - Genus: Convolvulus
    - Convolvulus arvensis (introduced) (common names: aoliq, bindweed)
    - Convolvulus glomeratus (native) (common names: aoliq, madada)

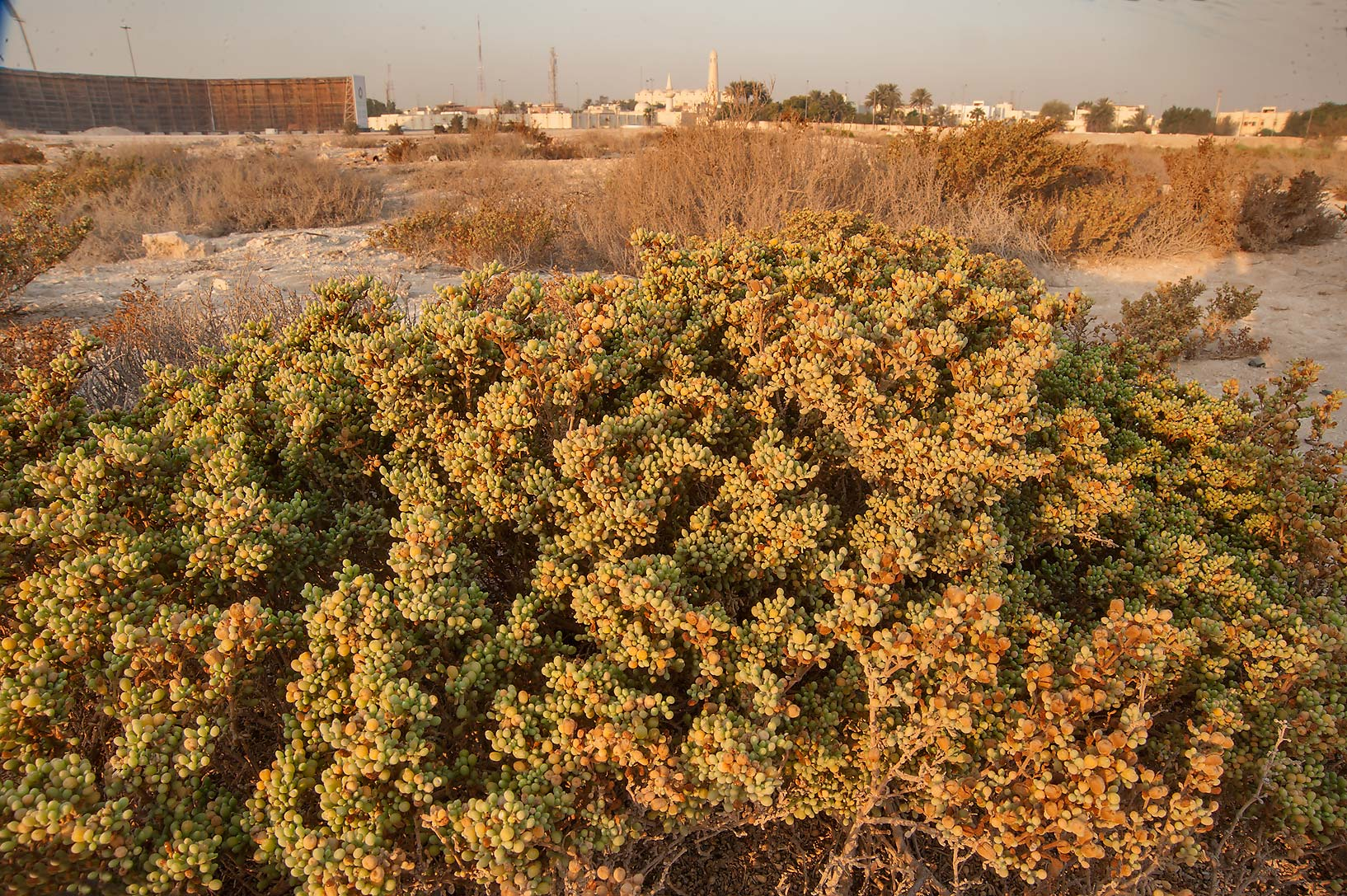
A large bush of Zygophyllum qatarense growing in a saline wasteland in the West Bay area of Doha

==== Order: Zygophyllales ====
- Family: Zygophyllaceae
  - Genus: Zygophyllum
    - Zygophyllum qatarense (native)

=== Class: Psilotopsida ===
==== Order: Ophioglossales ====
- Family: Ophioglossaceae
  - Genus: Ophioglossum
    - Ophioglossum polyphyllum (native)

== See also ==
- Fauna of Qatar
- Wildlife of Qatar
