= Wildlife of Qatar =

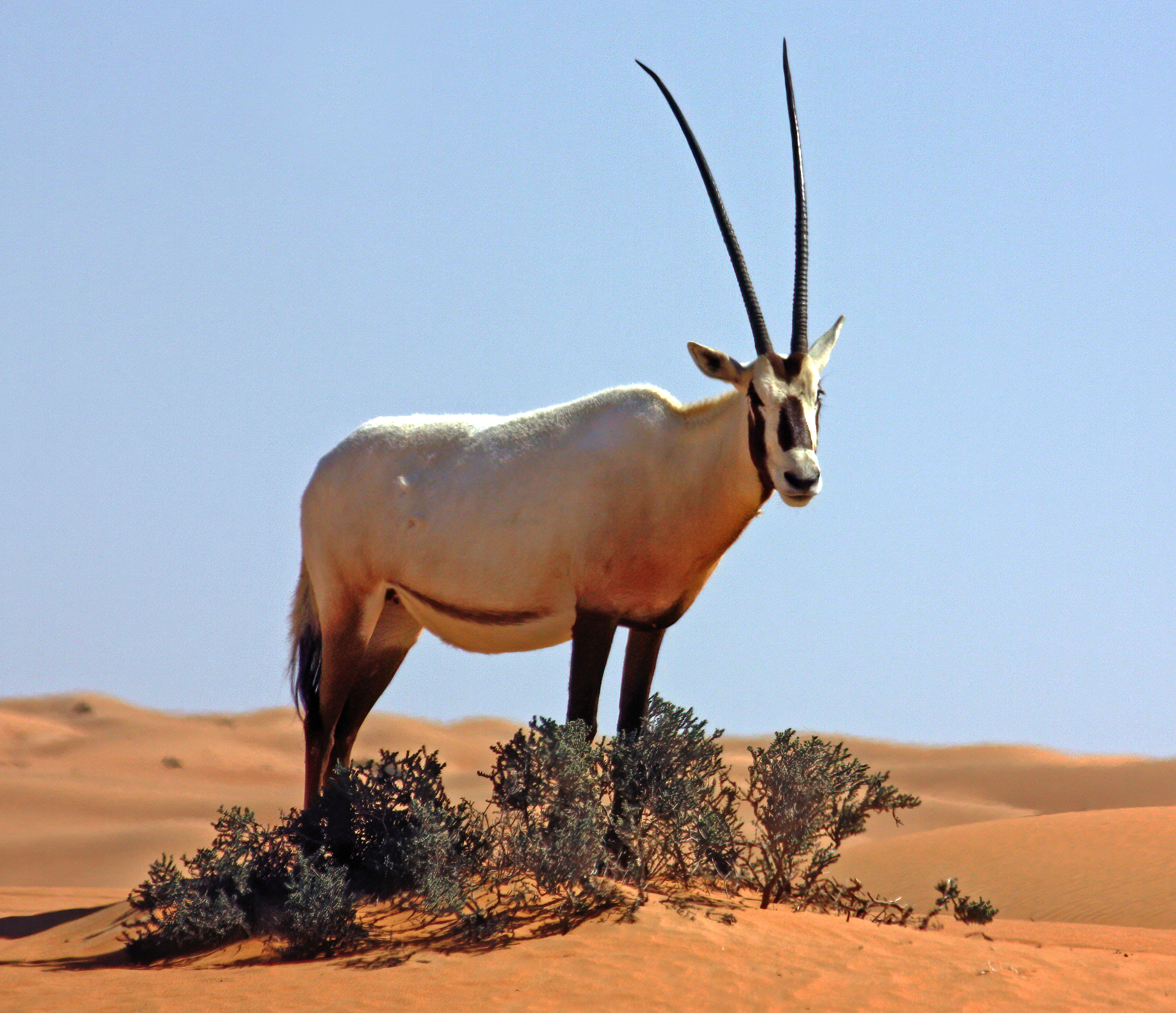
Arabian oryx, the national animal of Qatar

The wildlife of Qatar includes the peninsula's flora and fauna and their natural habitats. The country's terrestrial wildlife includes numerous small nocturnal mammals, a number of reptiles which mainly consist of lizard species, and arthropods. Aquatic animals primarily include fish, shrimp and pearl oysters. The desert and the shoreline form an important resting site for migratory bird species during autumn and spring. Urban and agricultural developments have led to an increase in bird species.

== Fauna ==
=== Mammals ===
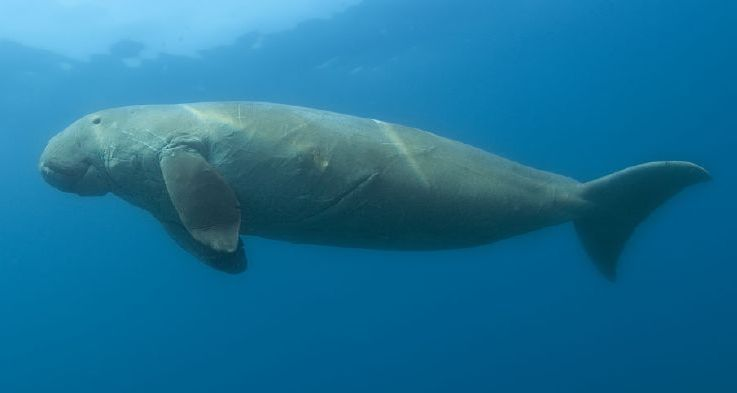
Dugong

There are 21 species of mammals in Qatar. Larger terrestrial mammals such as the Arabian oryx and Arabian gazelle are protected and are held in nature reserves. The Arabian gazelle is the only native gazelle species to Qatar and is locally referred to as the rheem.

Qatar's largest mammal is the dugong. Large numbers of dugong appear north of the peninsula's shores. Qatari waters accommodate one of the largest concentrations of dugong in the world. Two species of fox appear in the country. Sand cats also occur in the desert, and sometimes take over abandoned fox dens. Honey badgers (also known as ratel) appear primarily in the southwest of the peninsula. Golden jackals, a species which was previously thought to have been extirpated in the 1950s, was re-discovered in 2008 in Ras Abrouq. Two species of bat are found in the country: the trident bat and the desert long-eared bat. The former is more common. Qatar has the highest density of camels in the Middle East.

=== Birds ===
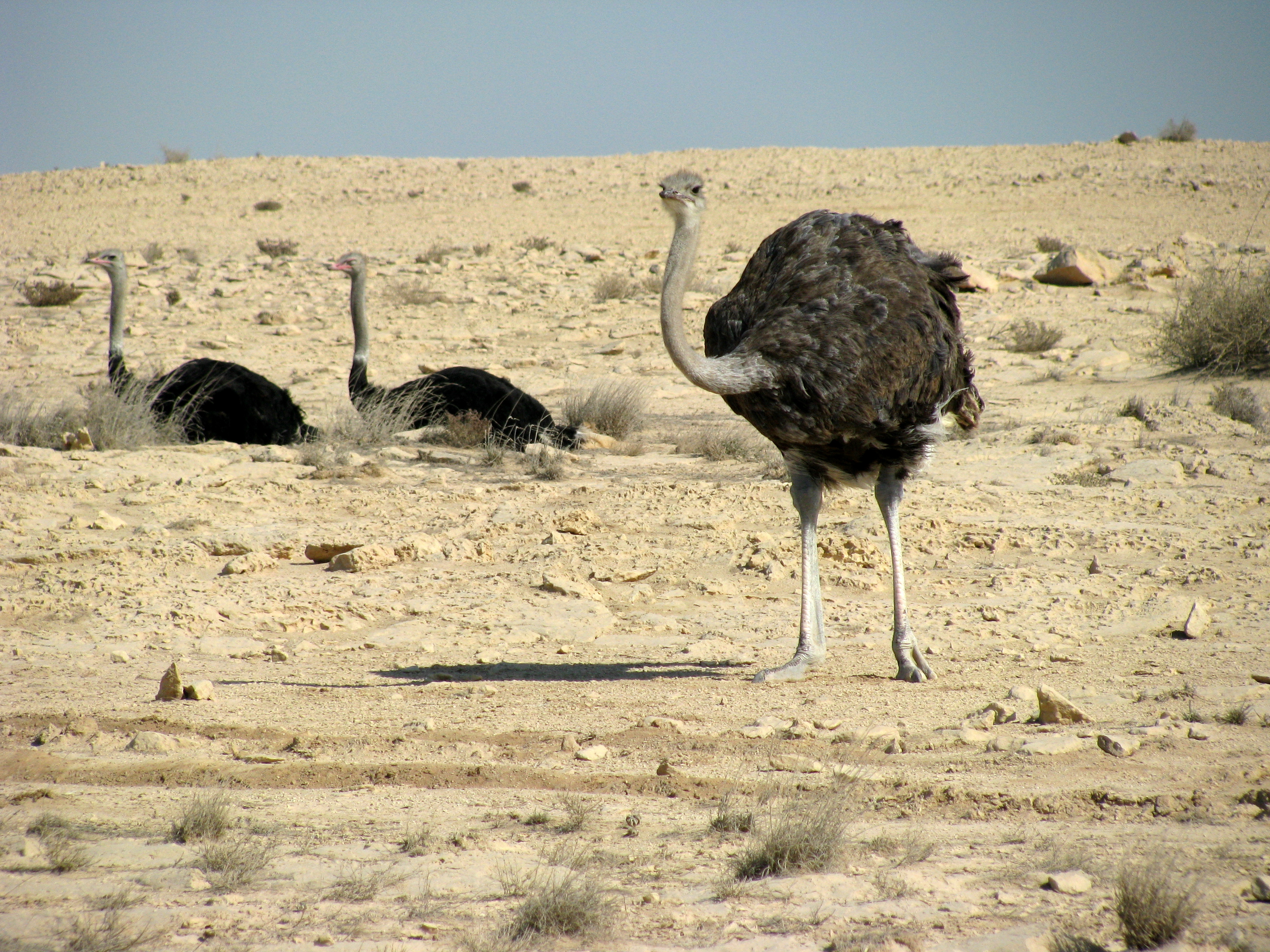
Ostriches in Ras Abrouq

There are 352 bird species that have been recorded in Qatar. The desert and the shoreline form an important resting site for a number of migratory bird species during autumn and spring. Coastal birds include gulls, terns, turnstones, sanderlings, Kentish plovers, herons and Socotra cormorants. They are usually observed year round. Lark species, including hoopoes, crested larks and black-crowned sparrow-larks are commonly observed in the desert during the summer. More commonly occurring species during the autumn and spring are swallows, swifts, house martins, warblers, redstarts, shrikes, wheatears, wagtails, harriers and falcons (including kestrels). Four of the primary types of birds which can be observed in deserts during the winter are various types of waders and gulls, coots, and little grebes. Rare birds such as the avocet and red-billed tropicbird breed on the peninsula.

The Arabian ostrich went extinct in 1945. The North African ostrich was introduced in the later 20th century and is now concentrated in Ras Abrouq.

=== Reptiles ===
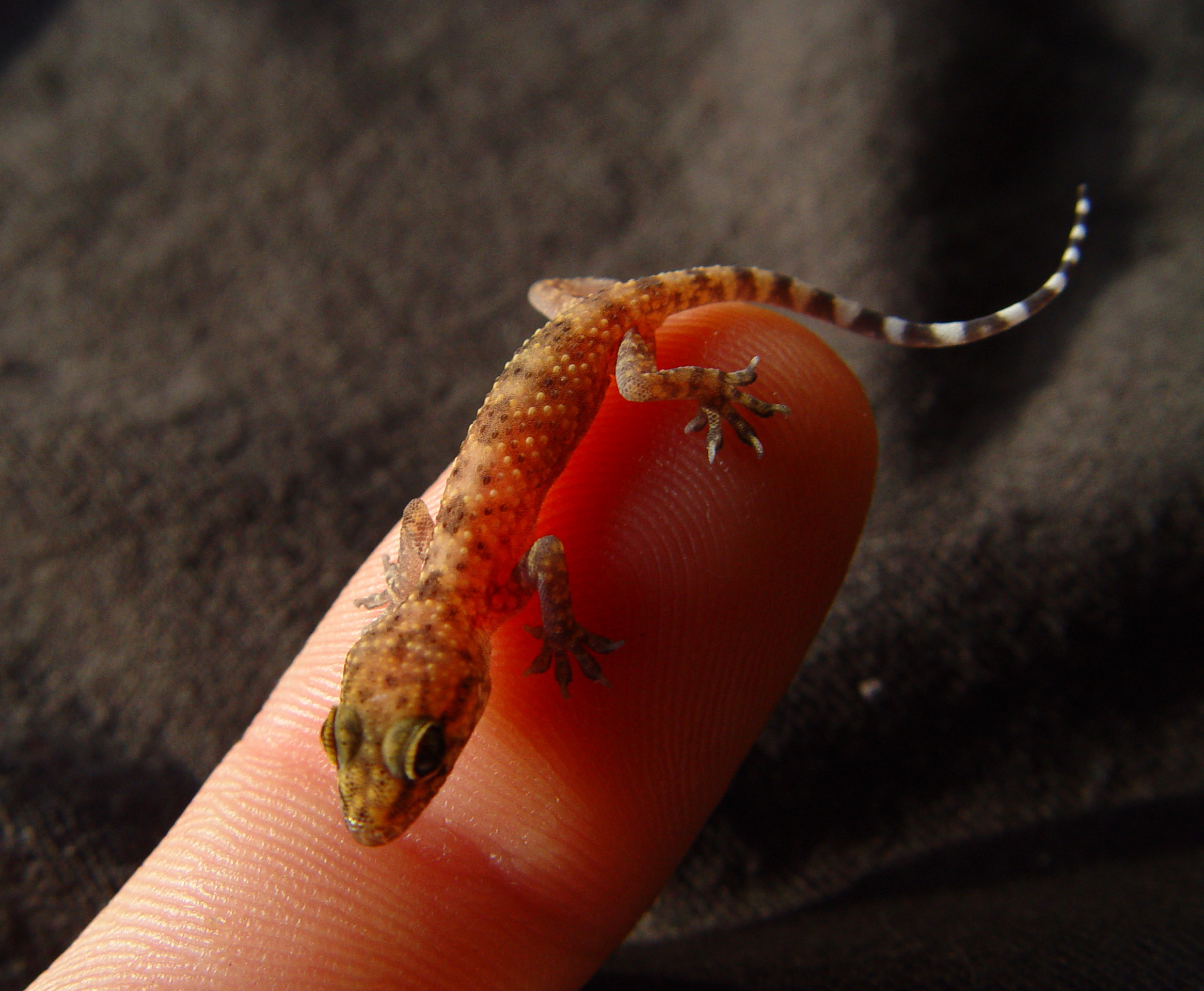
A common house gecko

Lizards are the most common reptile in Qatar. There are more than 21 species of lizards, with the most common family being Gekkonidae (9 species). Other common families include Lacertidae (4 species), Agamidae (3 species), Scincidae (2 species), and Varanidae, Sphaerodactylidae, and Trogonophidae with one species each. The horned desert viper, a venomous viper species, has been recorded in the country but is rarely sighted.

=== Fish ===
There are at least 500 fish species in Qatar. The northeastern coast has the highest density of fish. Fish caught in the aforementioned region include Carangidae, Pomadasidae, Lethrinidae and Lutjanidae.

Goatfish, sharks, groupers, barracudas, threadfins, lizardfish and rabbitfish also occur in lower frequency.

=== Invertebrates ===
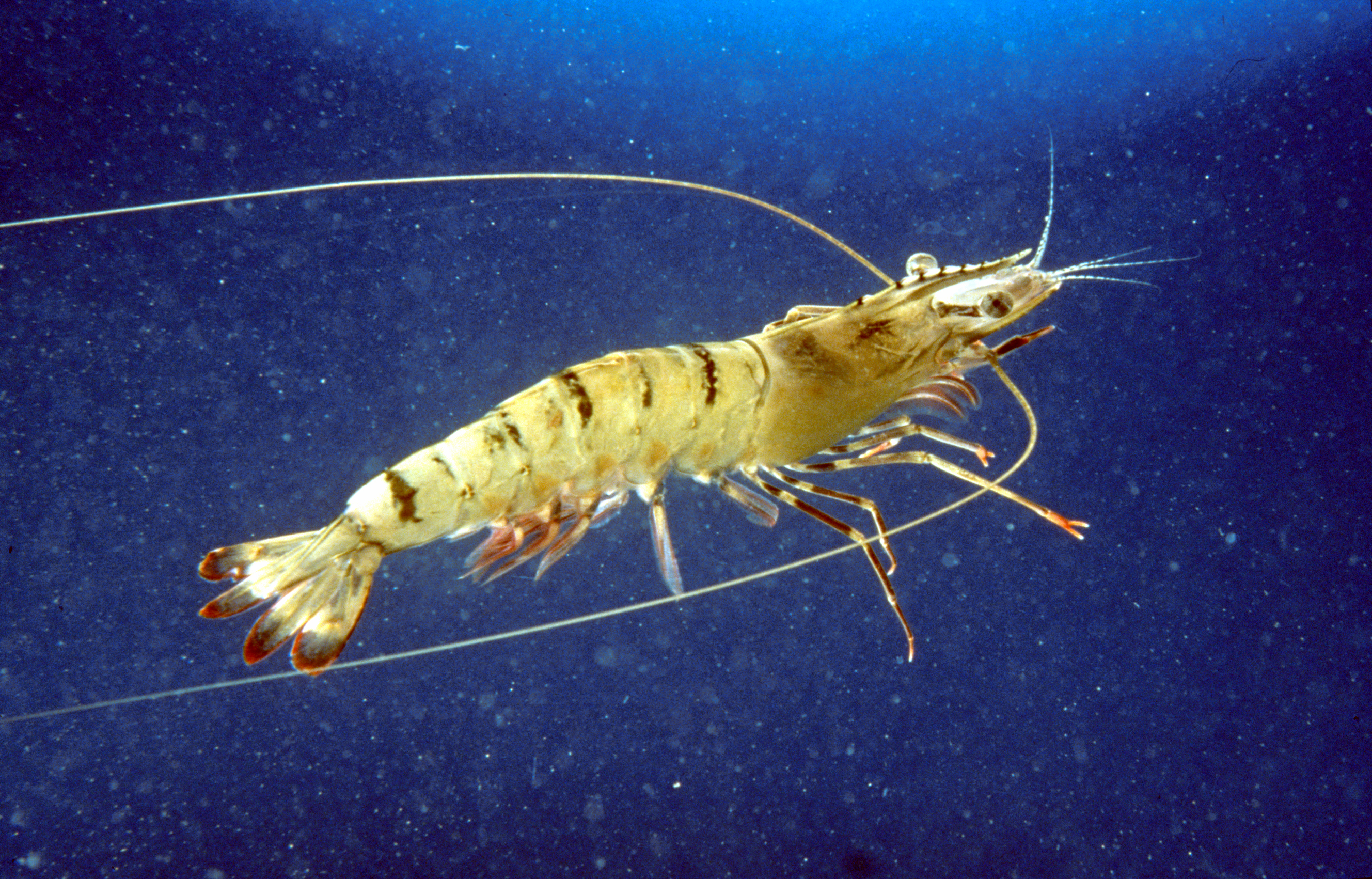
Penaeus monodon

Penaeus is by far the most abundant genus of prawn in the peninsula. Other crustaceans, such as Metapenaeus elegans, Metapenaeus stebbingi, Metapenaeus stridulands, and slipper lobsters have been documented.

There are more than two-hundred oyster beds in Qatari waters. The most significant oyster species is Pinctada margaritifera. Five species of terrestrial snails, each belonging to a different genera, have been recorded in the country. Zootecus insularis is the most widespread. None of them are indigenous. Mudflats and other intertidal habitats tend to contain the highest distribution of gastropods, polychaetes, bivalves and decapods.

At least 170 species of insects belonging to 15 orders exist in Qatar. These include Thysanura, Ephemeroptera, Odonata, Orthoptera, Dermaptera, Embioptera, Isoptera, Dictyoptera, Anoplura, Hemiptera, Neuroptera, Lepidoptera, Diptera, Coleoptera and Hymenoptera.

== Flora ==
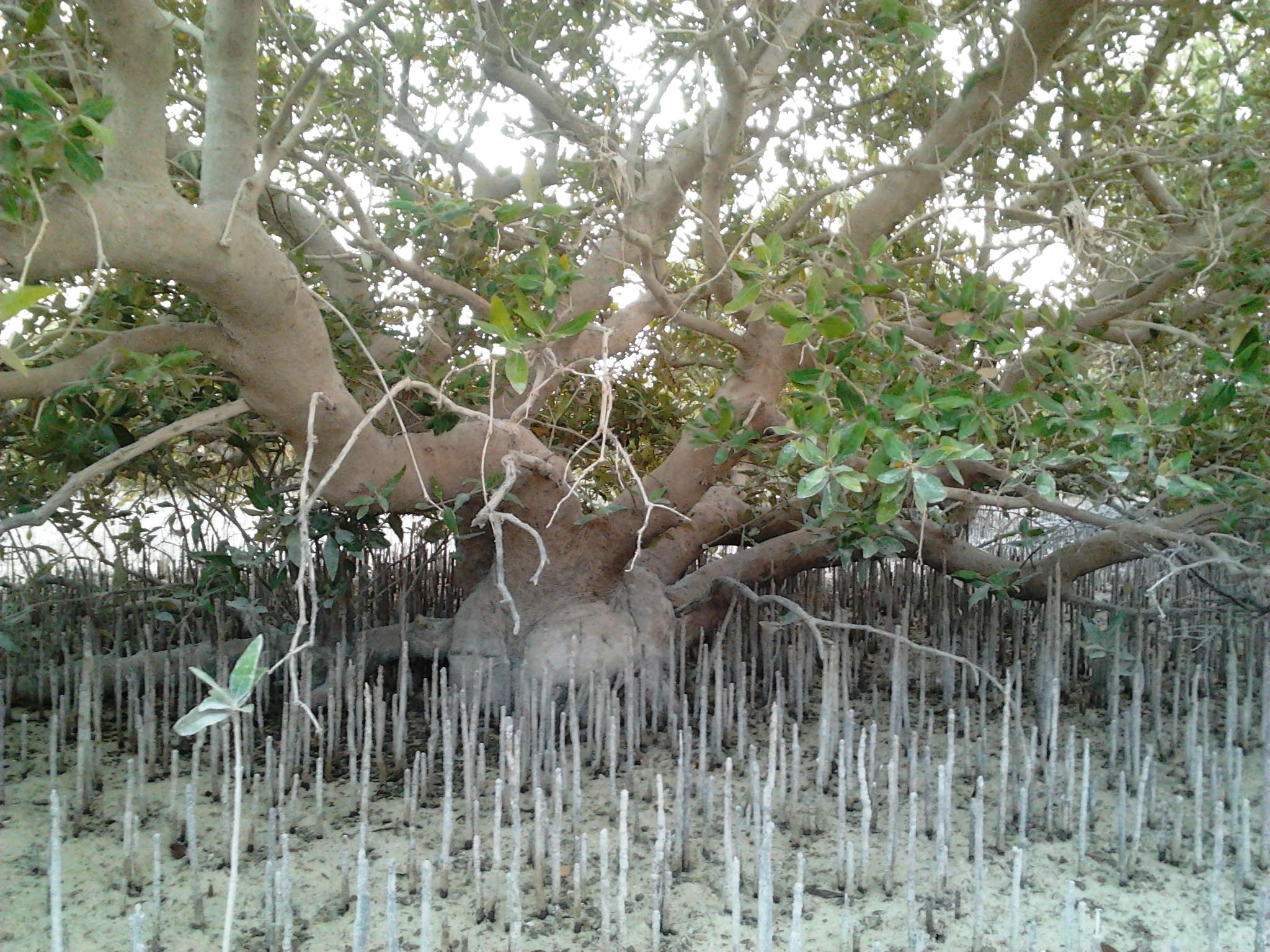
Mangrove forest in Al Thakhira, on Qatar's eastern coast

More than 300 species of wild plants are present in the peninsula. Vegetation is extremely sparse in the hamada landscape due to the heavily weathered soil. A native species of tree, Vachellia tortilis (known locally as samr), grows in this habitat. Its adaptive capabilities to the desert environment renders it one of the most common forms of vegetation in the country. Zygophyllum qatarense and Lycium shawii are also adapted to grow in this landscape.

Shallow depressions referred to as rawdat constitute a more varied selection of plants since rainwater run off is more easily accumulated. Ziziphus nummularia favors deeper soil in this type of habitat, whereas the grass Cymbopogon parkeri is found in shallower soils. In the south of the peninsula, Panicum turgidum and Vachellia tortilis grow in the wind-blown soils.

== See also ==
- Natural areas of Qatar
