= Metapenaeus bennettae =

Scientific classification
- Domain: Eukaryota
- Kingdom: Animalia
- Phylum: Arthropoda
- Class: Malacostraca
- Order: Decapoda
- Suborder: Dendrobranchiata
- Family: Penaeidae
- Genus: Metapenaeus
- Species: M. bennettae

Binomial name
- Metapenaeus bennettae Racek & Dall, 1965

Species of prawn

Metapenaeus bennettae is a species of small prawn found in eastern Australia, where it is called the greentail or greasyback prawn.

The prawns are covered in fine hairs, giving them a slippery feel when handled. They are collected commercially and recreationally for food and form part of the catches known as bay prawns and school prawns.

== Names ==
The term "bay prawn" may be listed as a common name for M. bennettae. Bay prawns most generally refer to mixed catch of small prawns from Moreton Bay and other Queensland fisheries. More particularly, bay prawn may be taken to mean M. bennettae and M. insolitus. (See #Commercial use.)

"School prawns" are small prawns netted in rivers and estuaries. These are primarily M. macleayi in eastern Australia and M. dalli west of Cape York. Consequently, those two species may be referred to as Eastern School Prawn and Western School Prawn. However, the term school prawn is also applied informally to other species, including M. bennettae.

Several species of Metapenaeus have fine hairs on their bodies, giving a slippery or greasy feel. The term greasyback has been applied to M. bennettae, M. insolitus, and M. ensis. M. bennettae is distinguished from the others as an "inshore greasyback prawn." Inshore greasybacks are harvested at depths less than 15 m; offshore greasybacks (M. ensis) are found at 18–30 m.

The United Nations Food and Agriculture Organisation (FAO) designates the names greentail, emerald, and greasyback shrimp for M. bennettae, M. insolitus, and M. ensis respectively. (Note: FAO provides names in English, French, and Spanish. For M. bennettae, these are literal translations of "green tail": "Greentail shrimp (En), Crevette queue verte (Fr), Camarón rabo verde (Sp)".)

M. bennettae has been misidentified in the literature as M. mastersii (Haswell), (a synonym of M. ensis), and as M. dalli.

== Life cycle ==
Juveniles are found in rivers up to 35 km from the sea, moving down to coastal lakes and estuaries as they mature. Whereas other penaeid prawns spawn offshore, the greentail prawn can reproduce in shallow lagoons. They reach sexual maturity at one year and spawn in summer around the time of full moon.

== Distribution ==
The greentail prawn is endemic to the east coast of Australia and has been found as a non-native species in New Zealand.

Its distribution in New Zealand is tracked as a "key" invasive or indicator non-indigenous species.

== Commercial use ==
They are collected commercially and recreationally for food. Marketable prawns are around 8–10 cm and 8 g, though they can grow to 13 cm. They form part of the (500 t/yr) "bay prawn" catch in Queensland, primarily from Moreton Bay. Bay prawns include M. bennettae, M. insolitus, school prawns (M. macleayi), and juveniles of larger species. In New South Wales, the greentail is a secondary catch of trawling for school and king prawns and for squid in the Clarence, Hunter, and Hawkesbury Rivers. From 1991 to 2009, the annual landing of greentail prawns in NSW varied between 10 and 60 t. Together, M. bennettae and M.insolitus have the export code PWY "Prawns - Bay", distinct from PWS "Prawns - School" for M. dalli and M. macleayi. The CAAB (Codes for Australian Aquatic Biota) species code is 28 711022. (Note: Additionally, there are special codes for prawns that are undistinguished between, or a mixture of: M. bennettae and M.insolitus, 28 711901; M. macleayi and M. bennettae, 28 711903.)
