= Fauna of Qatar =

Native animals of Qatar

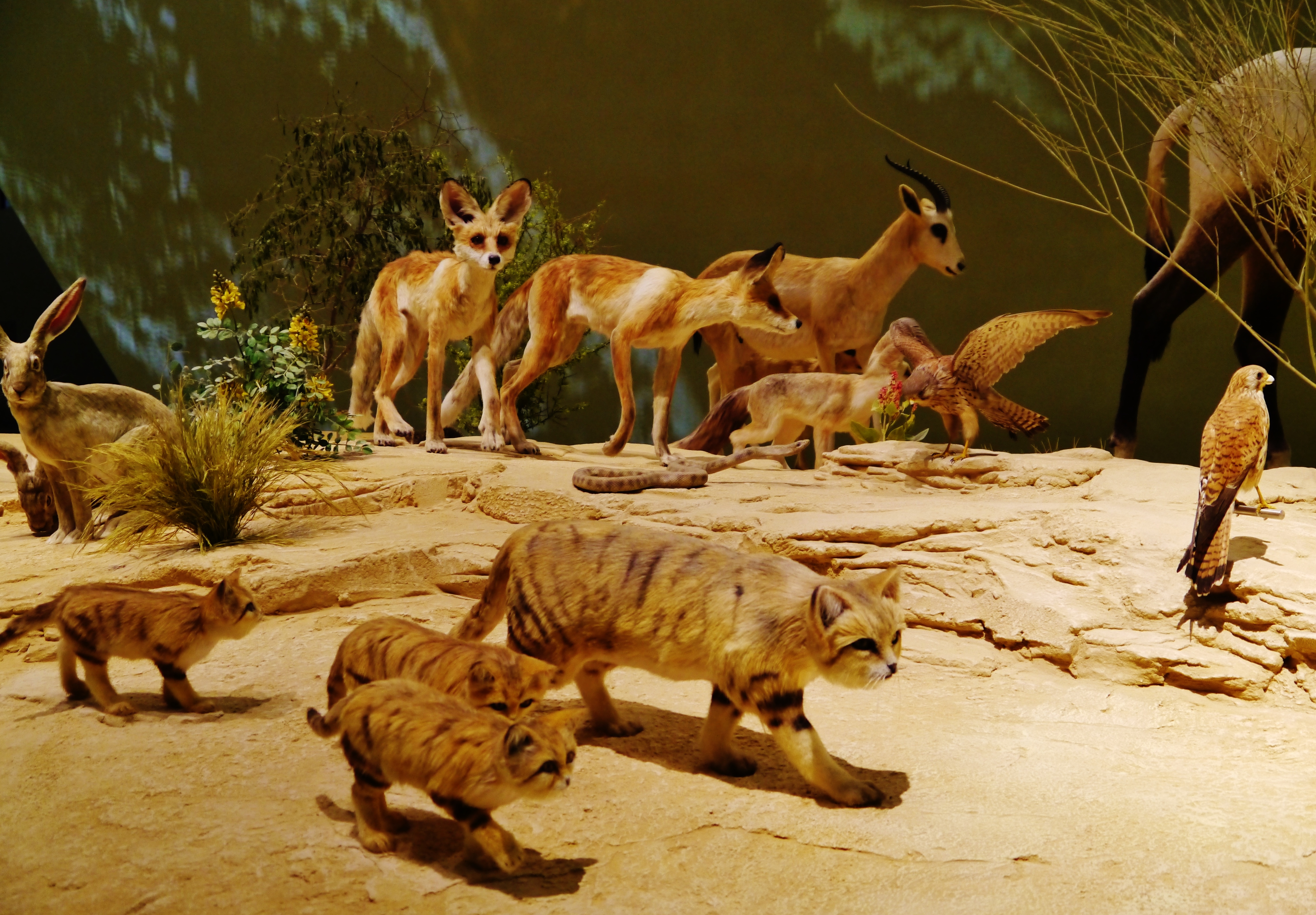
Wildlife of Qatar on display at the Qatar National Museum

Qatar is a peninsula on the northeastern coast of the Arabian Peninsula, facing mainland Saudi Arabia to the south and surrounded elsewhere by the Persian Gulf. A strait separates Qatar from the island kingdom of Bahrain.

Al Wabra Wildlife Preservation was a private zoological park and conservation centre founded by Saud bin Muhammed Al Thani to provide sanctuary for various rare species. It also served as a successful breeding centre for international breeding programmes, working with global zoos and organizations, for endangered animals such as the addra gazelle, addax, beira and dibatag (small antelopes), beisa and Arabian oryx, the golden-headed lion tamarin, the North African ostrich, the Northeast African cheetah, Nubian ibex, and Lear's and Spix's macaws, in addition to many other rare birds. The centre also bred several rare varieties of Encephalartos (cycads). As of 2018, it seems the animals at the preserve have been relocated to other facilities outside of Qatar, following the death of the Sheikh.

== Mammals ==
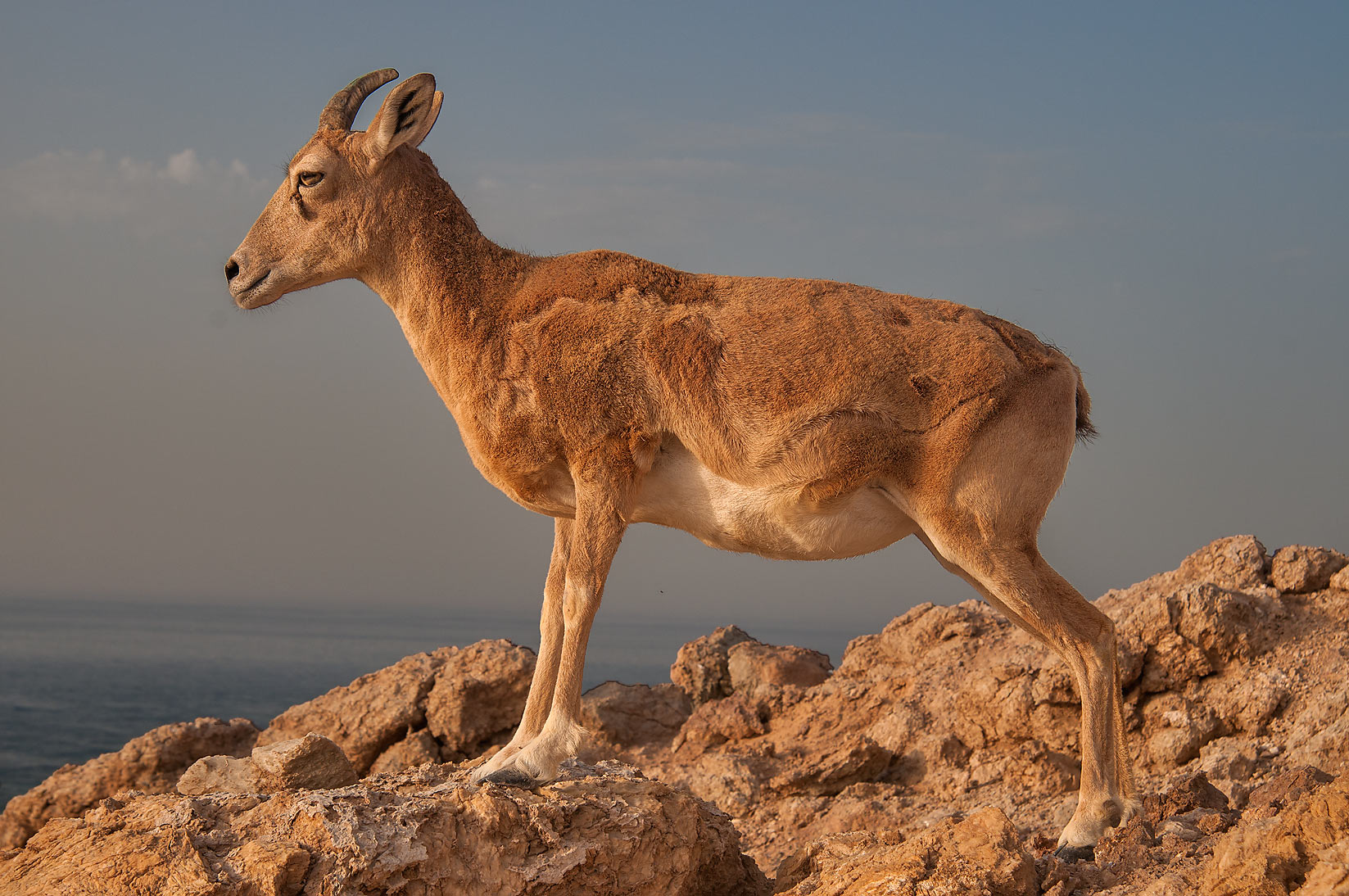
A female wild goat (Capra ibex) at Halul Island

Mammals in Qatar include Asiatic jackals, Cape hares, caracals, desert hedgehogs, red foxes, sand cats, striped hyenas, arabian sand gazelles, and Wagner's gerbils. Introduced species include the dromedary; the Arabian oryx has been reintroduced. Habitat includes arid and semi-arid desert, sand dunes, beaches, and mangrove islands.

Upwards of 80 tahrs inhabit Halul Island's hilly landscape, having expanded from a group of six individuals first transported to the island in 1963.

== Birds ==
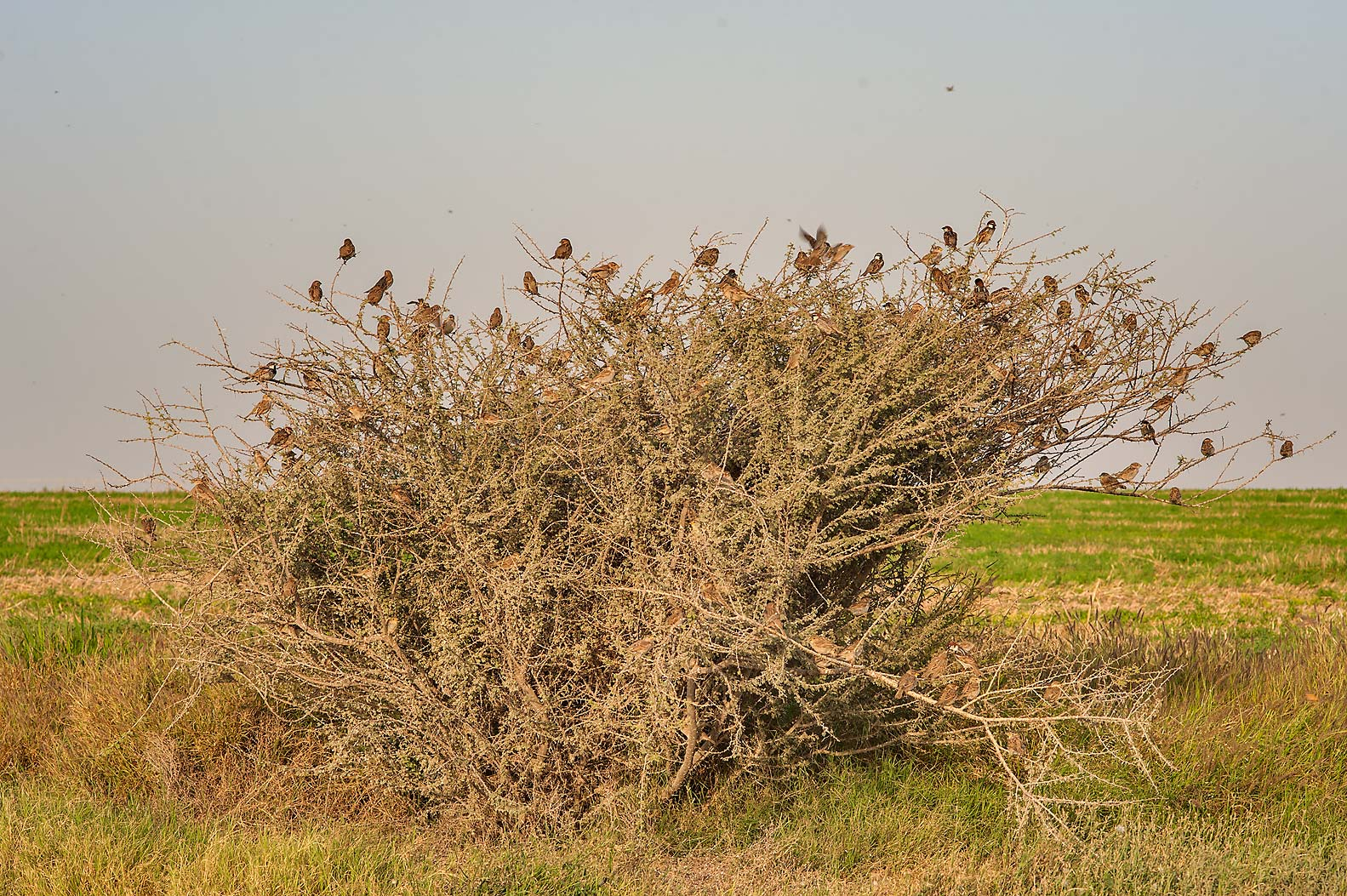
Large flock of Spanish sparrows (Passer hispaniolensis) sitting on a bush at Al Rekayya

There have been 352 bird species recorded in Qatar. Common bird species include the common mynas, rock doves, white-cheeked bulbuls, Eurasian collared doves, laughing doves and house sparrows. Other notable species are falcons, terns, wagtails, hoopoes, herons, larks, gulls, eagles and sandpipers.

On the offshore territory of Halul Island, at least 38 species of seabirds have been observed.

Fuwayrit is an important site for birds. A short-term survey in 2013 recorded upwards of 53 bird species off the coast.

== Marine life ==
Marine habitats include coral reefs, tidal salt marshes, mangroves and sea-grass kelp beds. Marine species include Mollusca, as well as over 500 species of fish with the most common being blackspot snappers, two-bar seabreams and yellowbar angelfish. Other species are carangids, emperors, snappers and sweet lips as well as barracuda, goatfish, grouper, lizard fish, rabbit fish, sharks, rays and thread fins. There are also Chinese white dolphins, grey dolphins and black finless porpoises.

Dugongs are known to congregate off the country's coasts. In the course of a study being carried out in 1986 and 1999 on the Persian Gulf, the largest-ever group sightings were made of more than 600 individuals to the west of Qatar.

Ras Laffan and Fuwayrit are the two most important sea turtle habitats in Qatar, their natural geography offering a suitable breeding ground, particularly within their sandspits. During the sea turtle breeding season (late spring and early summer), the Ministry of Municipality and Environment (MME) closes certain beaches to visitors and periodically patrols nesting sites.

== Livestock ==
Livestock include camels, sheep, goats and cattle.

== Arthropods ==
Insects and arthropods in the Arabian desert habitat include scorpions, spiders (including the large Galeodes arabs), ants, bees, wasps, moths, butterflies and beetles. Scarab beetles (Scarabaeoidea) are the most common type of beetle on the peninsula and consume dung and plant material.

== Reptiles ==
Reptiles include more than 100 lizard such as spiny-tailed agama, geckos, cobras, and horned vipers.

== Natural areas ==
Protected areas of Qatar include:

- Al Shahaniyah Park in Al-Shahaniya
- Al Wabra Wildlife Preservation
- Khor Al Udeid Fish Sanctuary
- Al Reem Biosphere Preserve (designated in 2007) is part of the World Network of Biosphere Reserves in the Arab States
- Ras Ushairij Gazelle Conservation Park
- Al Thakira Nature Reserve in Al Thakhira
- Khor Al Adaid Reserve in Khor Al Adaid
- Ras Abrouq Nature Reserve (also known as Bir Zekreet) in Ras Abrouq
- Umm Tais National Park

== See also ==
- Flora of Qatar
- Wildlife of Qatar
