= Glond =

Glond is an archaic name given to two different species of plants:

- Cowherb, Vaccaria hispanica, a flowering plant in the pink family used in Chinese traditional medicine
- Awlwort, Subularia aquatica, an aquatic plant in the mustard family

== See also ==
- Gland
