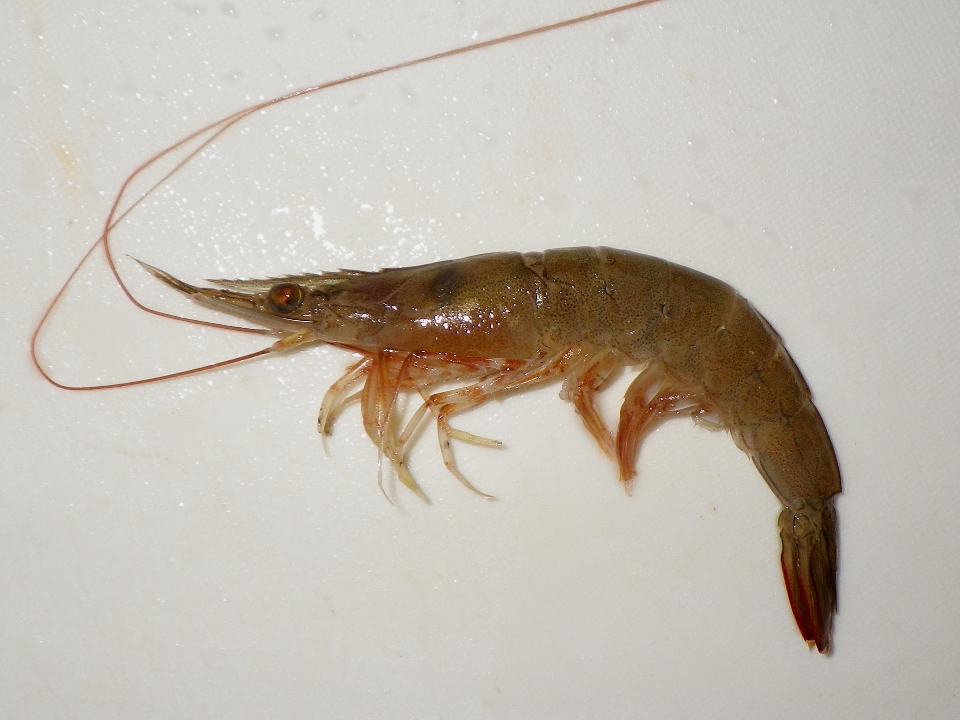
- Metapenaeus ensis

Scientific classification
- Domain: Eukaryota
- Kingdom: Animalia
- Phylum: Arthropoda
- Class: Malacostraca
- Order: Decapoda
- Suborder: Dendrobranchiata
- Family: Penaeidae
- Genus: Metapenaeus; Wood-Mason in Wood-Mason & Alcock, 1891

Type species
- Penaeus affinis H. Milne-Edwards, 1837

Synonyms
- Mangalura Miers, 1878

= Metapenaeus =

Genus of crustaceans

Metapenaeus is a genus of prawns, containing the following species:

- Metapenaeus affinis (H. Milne-Edwards, 1837)
- Metapenaeus alcocki M. J. George & Rao, 1968
- Metapenaeus anchistus (de Man, 1920)
- Metapenaeus arabicus Hassan, 1978
- Metapenaeus barbata (De Haan, 1844)
- Metapenaeus bennettae Racek & Dall, 1965
- Metapenaeus brevicornis (H. Milne-Edwards, 1837)
- Metapenaeus conjunctus Racek & Dall, 1965
- Metapenaeus dalli Racek, 1957
- Metapenaeus demani (Roux, 1921)
- Metapenaeus dobsoni (Miers, 1878)
- Metapenaeus eboracensis Dall, 1957
- Metapenaeus elegans de Man, 1907
- Metapenaeus endeavouri (Schmitt, 1926)
- Metapenaeus ensis (De Haan, 1844)
- Metapenaeus insolitus Racek & Dall, 1965
- Metapenaeus intermedius (Kishinouye, 1900)
- Metapenaeus joyneri (Miers, 1880)
- Metapenaeus krishnatrii Silas & Muthu, 1976
- Metapenaeus kutchensis P. C. George, M. J. George & Rao, 1963
- Metapenaeus lysianassa (de Man, 1888)
- Metapenaeus macleayi (Haswell, 1879)
- Metapenaeus monoceros (Fabricius, 1798)
- Metapenaeus motohi Shinomiya & Sakai, 2009
- Metapenaeus moyebi (Kishinouye, 1896)
- Metapenaeus papuensis Racek & Dall, 1965
- Metapenaeus stebbingi Nobili, 1904
- Metapenaeus suluensis Racek & Dall, 1965
- Metapenaeus tenuipes Kubo, 1949
