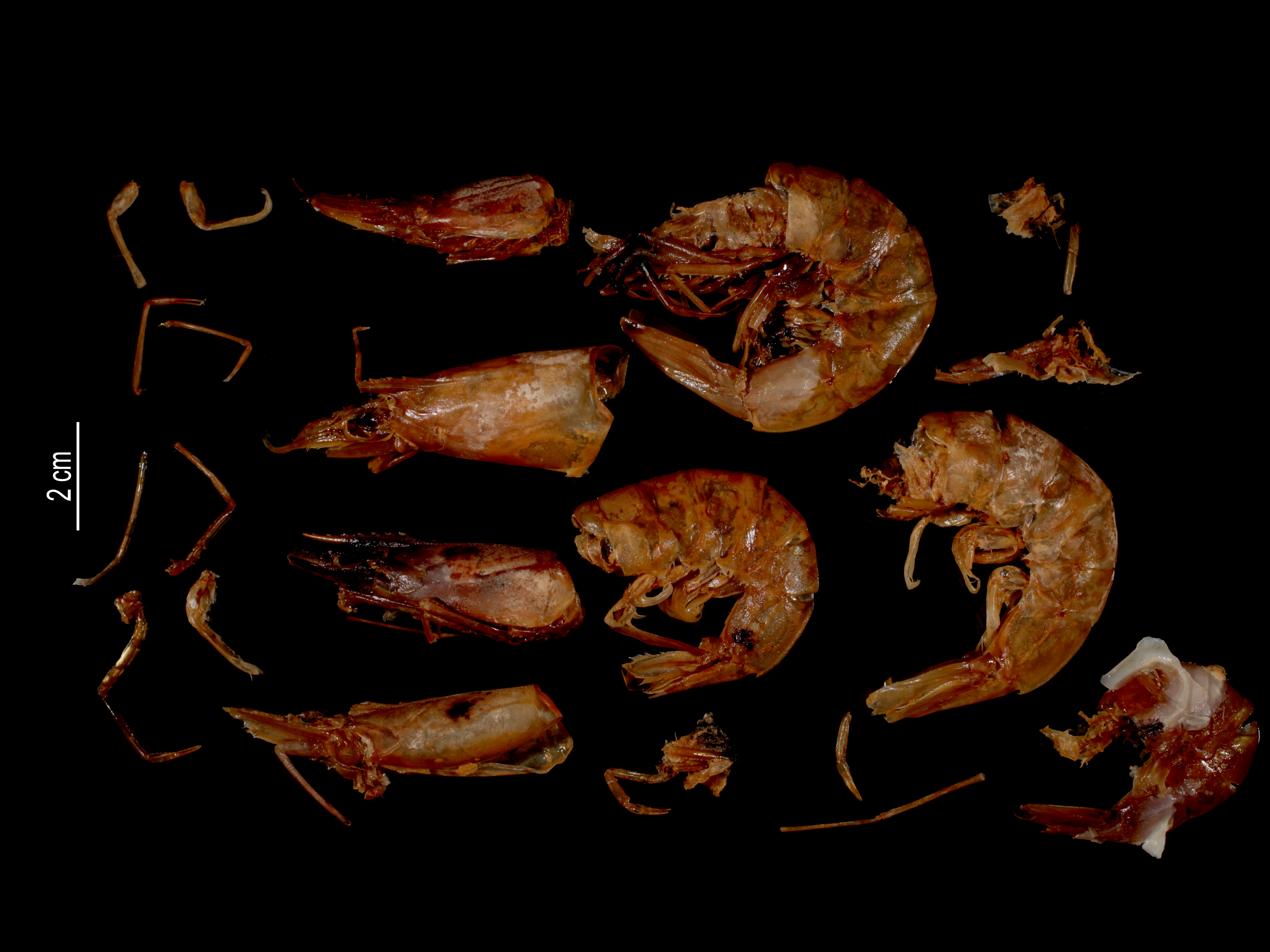

Scientific classification
- Kingdom: Animalia
- Phylum: Arthropoda
- Clade: Pancrustacea
- Class: Malacostraca
- Order: Decapoda
- Suborder: Dendrobranchiata
- Family: Penaeidae
- Genus: Metapenaeus
- Species: M. affinis

Binomial name
- Metapenaeus affinis H. Milne Edwards, 1837

= Metapenaeus affinis =

Species of crustacean

Metapenaeus affinis, commonly referred to as the Jinga shrimp, is a species of prawn in the family Penaeidae. It grows up to 22 cm (8.7 in) in length, with its common length being 17 cm (6.7 in). Pale green or pink-brown body with green or red-brown specks.

== Distribution ==
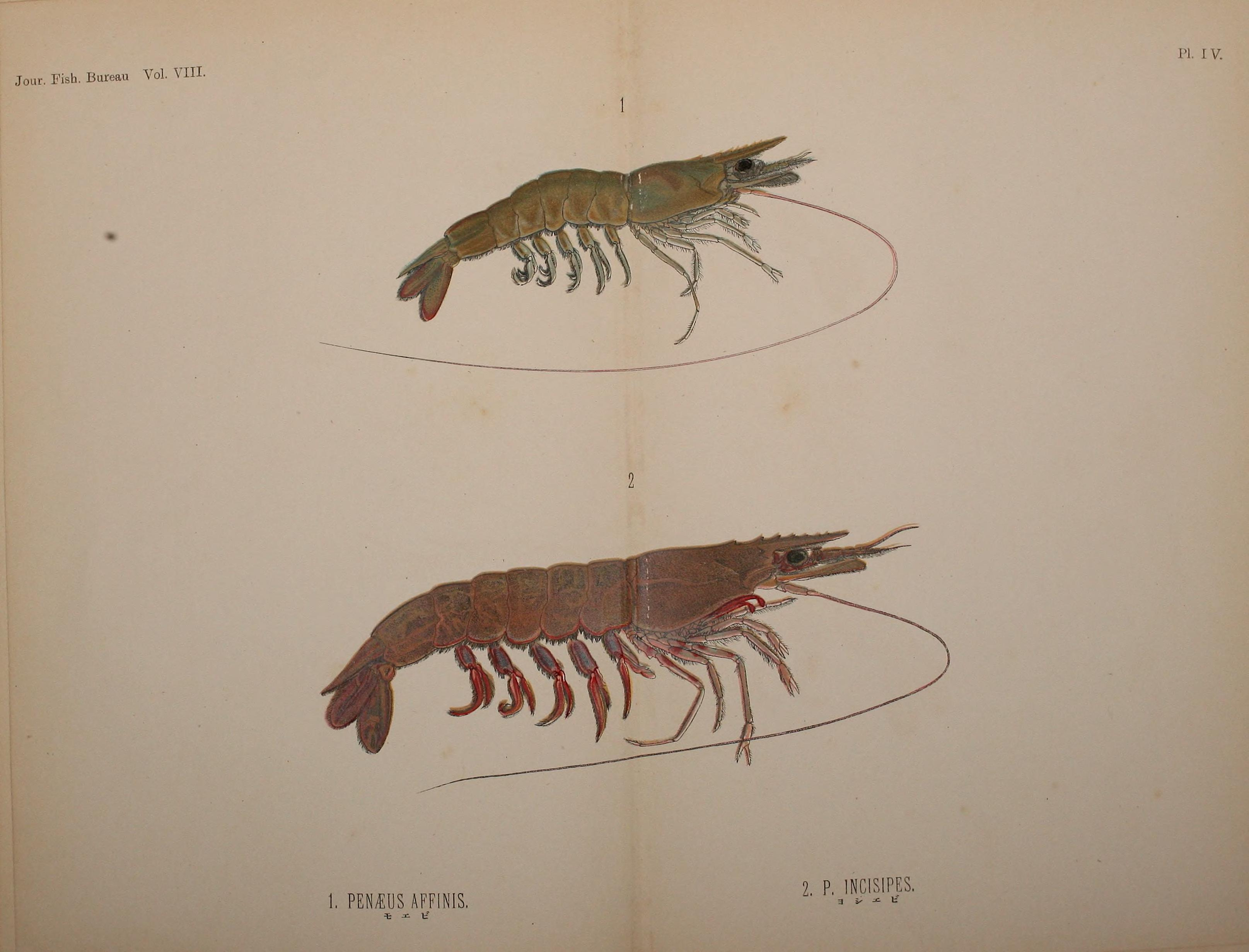
Fig. 1. Penaeus affinis now known as M. affinis.

M. affinis is found in the Indo-Pacific, from the Persian Gulf to Hawaii, at depths of 5 to 92 metres (20 to 300 ft).

== Interest to Fisheries ==
This species is most important in Pakistan's surrounding waters. It is regularly fished off of the Persian Gulf. M. affinis is considered the most important species of Metapenaeus in India. These shrimp are exported in Bangladesh for local consumption.
