= Sand shrimp =

Sand shrimp may refer to:

- Crangon affinis
- Crangon crangon
- Crangon septemspinosa
- Metapenaeus ensis
