= Al Reem Biosphere Reserve =

Coordinates: 25.7500°N 51.0000°E

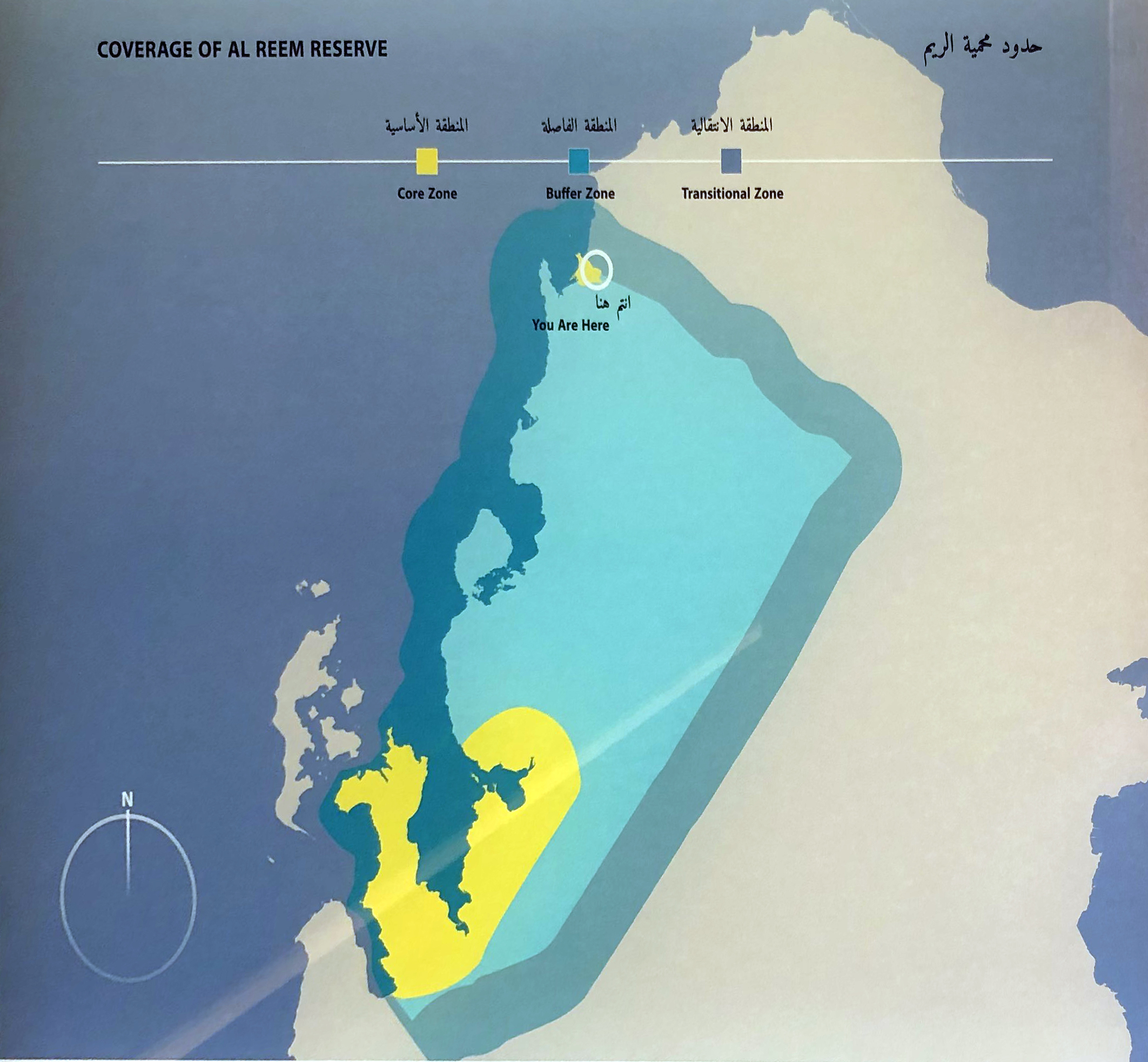
Al Reem Biosphere Reserve

Al Reem Biosphere Reserve is an inhabited area of 120,000 hectares in northwest Qatar that includes semi-arid desert landscapes that are home to gazelles and Arabian oryx, among other wildlife. It is one of 24 UNESCO Biosphere Reserves in the Middle East (World Network of Biosphere Reserves in the Arab States). It was established in 2005 and accounts for approximately 10% of Qatar's land area. It was recognized by UNESCO in 2007.

The reserve is 65 kilometers (40 mi) northwest of Doha. Due to its dense vegetation, this reserve is of great importance for the people of Qatar.

== See also ==
- Flora of Qatar
- Fauna of Qatar
