= Omayed =

Coordinates: 29.0900°N 30.4500°E

Omayed (Arabic: العميد) is a 75,800 ha UNESCO designated Biosphere Reserve in western Egypt in a sparsely populated region of coastal desert 80 kilometers west of Alexandria and 200 kilometers east of Matruh. It was designated as a biosphere reserve in 1981 and extended in 1998. The area includes four villages with a total 400 inhabitants. Habitats include coastal calcareous dunes, inland ridges, saline depressions, nonsaline depressions and inland plateau. The area provides important moss habitat. The Khashm El-Aish plateau in Omayed Protected Area (OPA) is home to 29 moss taxa recorded for the first time from Mediterranean coast, Egypt and 16 of them new records to the western Mediterranean coast. OPA includes 0.07% of Egypt's land mass but is home to more than 17 percent of its moss flora.

Ecosystems:

- Coastal Dunes: Ammophila arenaria, Euphorbia paralias and Pancratium maritimum
- Inland ridges with minimal soil: Thymellaea spp., Gymnocarpus decadrum, Plantago albicans and Asphodelus microcarpa
- Salty marsh depressions dominated by Salicornia fruticosa, Cressa cretica, Atriplex halimus
- Non-saline depressions and inland plateau: Artemisia monosperma, Hammada elegans, Anabasis articulata, Hammada scorpia, Suaeda pruinosa, Salsola tetrandra
- Agricultural areas of grazing land and fig plantations

== See also ==
- World Network of Biosphere Reserves in the Arab States
