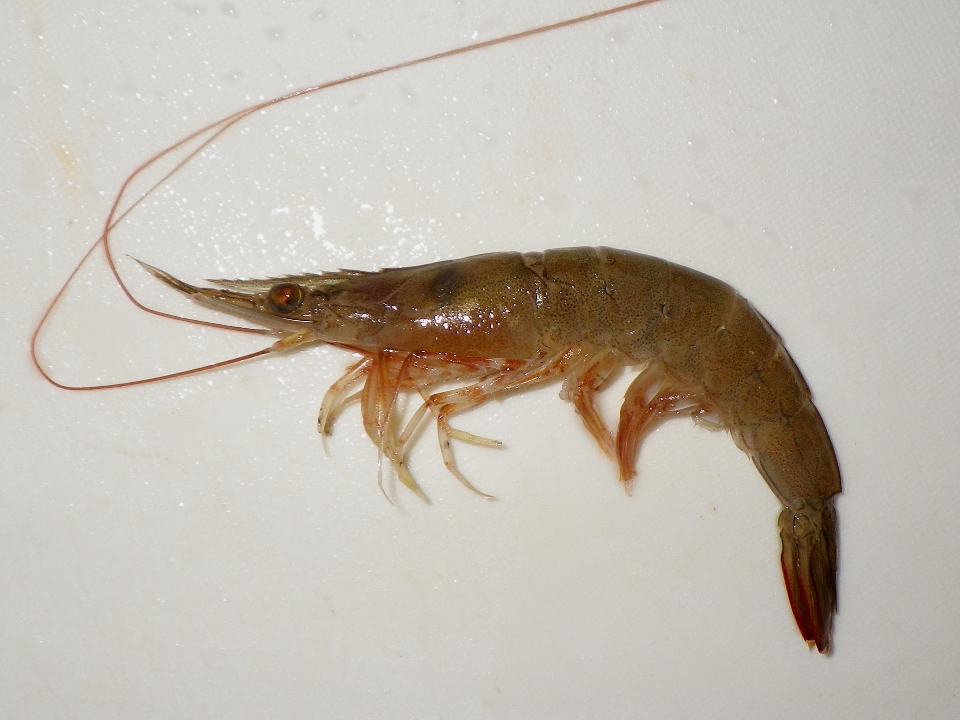

Scientific classification
- Kingdom: Animalia
- Phylum: Arthropoda
- Class: Malacostraca
- Order: Decapoda
- Suborder: Dendrobranchiata
- Family: Penaeidae
- Genus: Metapenaeus
- Species: M. ensis

Binomial name
- Metapenaeus ensis (De Haan, 1844)

Synonyms
- Metapenaeus mastersii Hall, 1962

= Metapenaeus ensis =

Species of crustacean

Metapenaeus ensis (sometimes called the greasyback shrimp or sand shrimp) is a species of prawn.

== Distribution ==
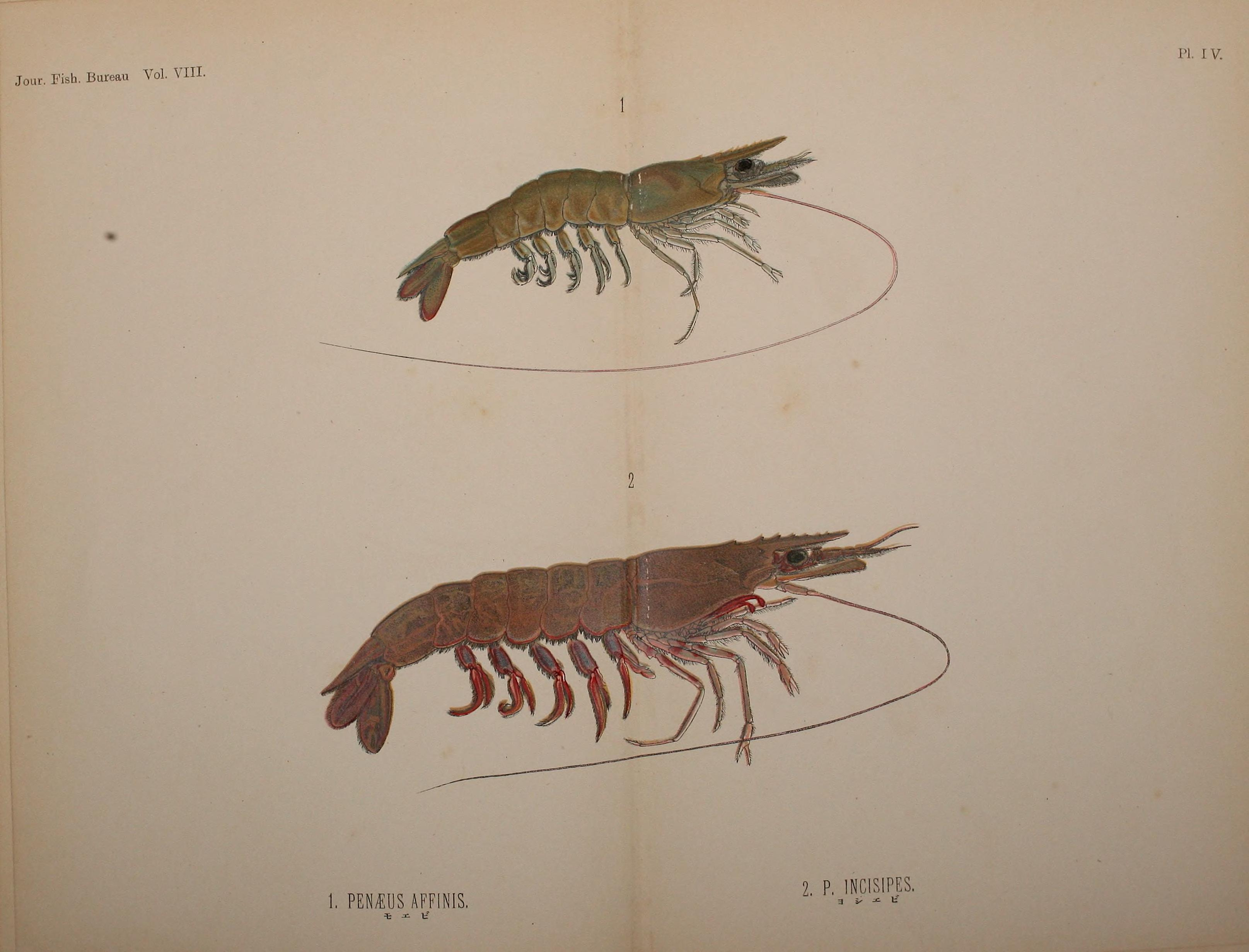
Fig 2. Penaeus incisipes now known as M. ensis.

Metapenaeus ensis is found in the waters of the Indo-West Pacific Region. The shrimp is found in brackish waters with depths between 8 and 95 metres.

The shrimp is found in commercial fisheries in Lau Fau Shan to Mai Po in Hong Kong.

== Usage ==
The shrimp is fished commercially and sometimes used as bait.
