= Metapenaeus dalli =

Scientific classification
- Kingdom: Animalia
- Phylum: Arthropoda
- Clade: Pancrustacea
- Class: Malacostraca
- Order: Decapoda
- Suborder: Dendrobranchiata
- Family: Penaeidae
- Genus: Metapenaeus
- Species: M. dalli

Binomial name
- Metapenaeus dalli (Racek,1957)

Species of crustacean

Metapenaeus dalli, commonly known as the western school shrimp, is a species of prawn in the genus Metapenaeus. It grows up to 8.5 cm.

== Distribution ==
Metapenaeus dalli is found in the Indo-west Pacific, around the west coast of Australia and Indonesia. Benthic and estuarine, found in depths of 9 to 33 meters, on muddy or sandy bottoms. It prefers temperatures of around 27.7 degrees Celsius.

== Interest to fisheries ==
Metapenaeus dalli is of minor interest to fisheries, but sometimes caught with handnets in estuaries of Western Australia.
