= Metapenaeus stebbingi =

Scientific classification
- Domain: Eukaryota
- Kingdom: Animalia
- Phylum: Arthropoda
- Class: Malacostraca
- Order: Decapoda
- Suborder: Dendrobranchiata
- Family: Penaeidae
- Genus: Metapenaeus
- Species: M. stebbingi

Binomial name
- Metapenaeus stebbingi Nobili, 1904

Synonyms
- Mangalura stebbingi (Nobili, 1904); Metapenaeopsis stebbingi (Nobili, 1904); Penaeopsis stebbingi (Nobili, 1904)

Species of crustacean

Metapenaeus stebbingi, the peregrine shrimp is a species of marine crustacean from the family Penaeidae. It is native to the Indian Ocean but in the second half of the 20th century it was found to have invaded the Mediterranean Sea.

== Description ==
Metapenaeus stebbingi grows to a maximum length of 11 cm in males and 14 cm in females. The shell is off white or cream, marked with rust-coloured speckles. The tail fan has reddish margins, with the antennae being a similar colour. The upper margin of the rostrum has 7–10 teeth while the first and third pairs of walking legs have a basal spine. The merus of the fifth walking leg of the male has an indentation on its inner margin.

== Distribution ==
Metapenaeus stebbingi was formerly thought to be endemic to the Red Sea but is now known from many parts of the western Indian Ocean from the Western Cape to western India. It was first identified in the Mediterranean off Egypt in 1924 and has since spread as far north as the south coast of Anatolia and as far west as Tunisia.

== Biology ==
Metapenaeus stebbingi occurs in water with sandy or sandy-mud substrates down to 90 m in depth. The juveniles are found in shallow coastal waters and while the adults are normally further offshore where they bury themselves in the substrate during the day, emerging to forage at night. Studies in East Africa found that this species was at its greatest abundance in areas of sand flats and mud flats. In Turkey M. stebbingi was found to be absent from inshore water from September through the winter.

== Fisheries and aquaculture ==
Metapenaeus stebbingi is an important species for fisheries in its native range. Since invading the Mediterranean it has become increasingly important in fisheries, especially in the Levant Sea. In southern Turkey it is used in aquaculture, being reared in artificial ponds along the coast.

== Etymology ==
Metapenaeus stebbingi by the Italian carcinologist Giuseppe Nobili in 1904, the specific name honours the English Zoologist Thomas Roscoe Rede Stebbing.
