= Metapenaeus elegans =

Scientific classification
- Kingdom: Animalia
- Phylum: Arthropoda
- Clade: Pancrustacea
- Class: Malacostraca
- Order: Decapoda
- Suborder: Dendrobranchiata
- Family: Penaeidae
- Genus: Metapenaeus
- Species: M. elegans

Binomial name
- Metapenaeus elegans (De Haan, 1844)

Species of crustacean

Metapenaeus elegans, commonly known as the fine shrimp, is a species of prawn in the genus Metapenaeus. It grows up to 8.1 cm.

== Distribution ==
Metapenaeus elegans is benthic, found mostly in freshwater lagoons and ponds in Malaysia, Sri Lanka, and Indonesia. It is found in depths between 1 and 55 meters, usually in waters with low salinity. Prefers temperatures of between 27 and 29 degrees.

== Usage ==
It is sometimes caught with traps in Sri Lanka, but does not have a high commercial value.
