= World Network of Biosphere Reserves in the Arab States =

Man and the Biosphere Programme logo

Under UNESCO's Man and the Biosphere Programme, there are 31 biosphere reserves recognised as part of the World Network of Biosphere Reserves in the African States and Arab States. These are distributed across 12 countries in the region as of March 2018.

== Biosphere reserves ==
- ‡ – Also a World Heritage Site

Country	Image	Biosphere reserve	Designation year	Area	Description	Ref.
Algeria		Tassili n'Ajjer ‡	1986	7,200,000 ha (27,799 sq mi)		
Algeria		El Kala	1990	76,348 ha (295 sq mi)		
Algeria		Djurdjura	1997	35,660 ha (138 sq mi)		
Algeria		Chréa National Park	2002	36,985 ha (143 sq mi)		
Algeria	–	Taza National Park	2004	1,643 ha (6 sq mi)		
Algeria		Gouraya National Park	2004	2,080 ha (8 sq mi)		
Algeria		Belezma Range	2015	26,250 ha (101 sq mi)		
Algeria	–	Tlemcen Mountains	2016	98,532 ha (380 sq mi)		
Egypt		Omayed	1981	75,800 ha (293 sq mi)		
Egypt	–	Wadi Allaqi	1993	2,380,000 ha (9,189 sq mi)		
Jordan		Dana Biosphere Reserve	1998	30,800 ha (119 sq mi)		
Jordan		Wadi Mujib	2011	21,200 ha (82 sq mi)		
Lebanon		Al Shouf Cedar Nature Reserve	2005	29,540 ha (114 sq mi)		
Lebanon	–	Jabal Al Rihane Biosphere Reserve	2007	18,430 ha (71 sq mi)		
Lebanon		Jabal Moussa Biosphere Reserve	2009	6,500 ha (25 sq mi)		
Morocco		Arganeraie	1998	2,568,780 ha (9,918 sq mi)		
Morocco		Oasis du sud marocain	2000	7,185,371 ha (27,743 sq mi)		
Morocco		Atlas Cedar	2016	1,375,000 ha (5,309 sq mi)		
Morocco/Spain	–	Intercontinental Biosphere Reserve of the Mediterranean	2006	894,134 ha (3,452 sq mi)		
Qatar	–	Al Reem Biosphere Reserve	2007	118,888 ha (459 sq mi)		
Sudan	–	Dinder National Park	1979	890 ha (3 sq mi)		
Sudan	–	Radom National Park	1979	1,250,000 ha (4,826 sq mi)		
Sudan		Jebel Al Dair	2017	637,400 ha (2,461 sq mi)		
Syria		Lajat	2009	12,038 ha (46 sq mi)		
Tunisia		Bou-Hedma National Park	1977	16,988 ha (66 sq mi)		
Tunisia		Jebel ech Chambi	1977	43,723 ha (169 sq mi)		
Tunisia		Ichkeul lake	1977	14,100 ha (54 sq mi)		
Tunisia		Zembra	1977	550 ha (2 sq mi)		
United Arab Emirates	–	Marawah Island	2007	425,500 ha (1,643 sq mi)		
Yemen		Socotra	2003	2,681,640 ha (10,354 sq mi)		
Yemen	–	Bura'a	2011	4,280 ha (17 sq mi)		
