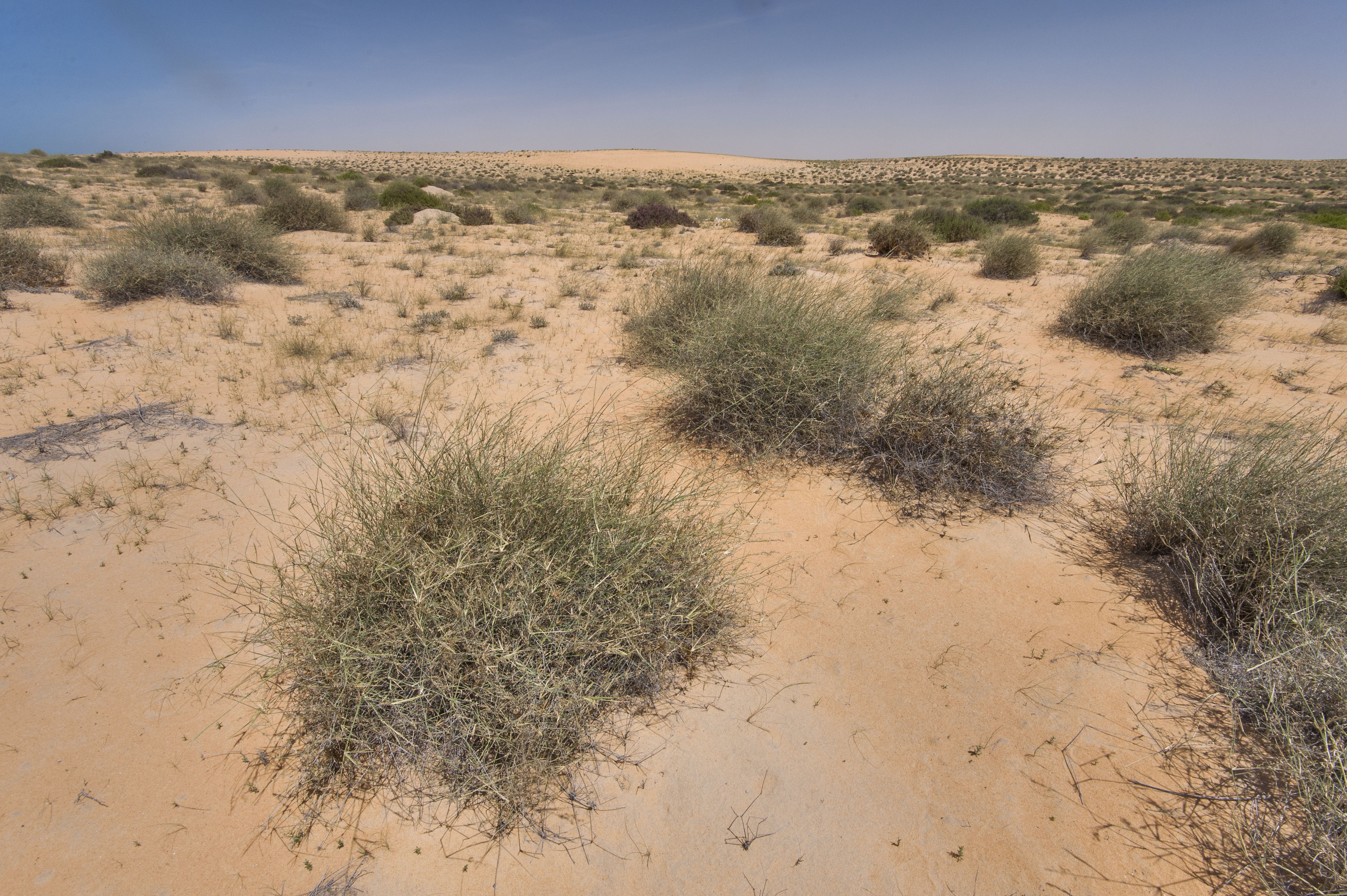

Scientific classification
- Kingdom: Plantae
- Clade: Embryophytes
- Clade: Tracheophytes
- Clade: Angiosperms
- Clade: Monocots
- Clade: Commelinids
- Order: Poales
- Family: Poaceae
- Subfamily: Panicoideae
- Genus: Panicum
- Species: P. turgidum

Binomial name
- Panicum turgidum Forssk.

= Panicum turgidum =

Species of plant

Panicum turgidum is an old world clumping desert bunchgrass of the genus Panicum. It is a plant of arid regions across Africa and Asia, and has been introduced to other parts of the world.

== Description ==
Panicum turgidum is a perennial bunchgrass, growing in dense bushes up to 1 metre (3.3 ft) tall. The stems are long-jointed, hard and polished, with few leaves, resembling bamboo shoots. Side shoots branch out at the nodes, and the stems bend over and root when the nodes get buried. The inflorescence is a terminal panicle up to 10 cm (4 in) long with solitary spikelets some 3 to 4 mm (0.12 to 0.16 in) long. The roots are covered in hairs to which fine sand adheres creating a felted appearance. This is a drought- and salt-tolerant species, and used for flour, fodder, thatch and erosion control.

== Distribution and habitat ==
It is common across the Sahara and Arabia, from Senegal to Pakistan, and known by a number of common names, most widely as Taman, tuman, or thaman in Egypt and Arabia; merkba or markouba in Mauritania and some Saharan Arabics; and afezu in Tamasheq. Other common names include guinchi (eastern Sahara) and du-ghasi (Somalia). It grows on sand dunes in hot, dry climates, and will also grow in latosols.

== Ecology ==
In the Nigerien Sahara, tussocks of Panicum turgidum act as a nurse plants for tree regeneration. They have been shown to facilitate the regeneration of Acacia tortilis subsp. raddiana by protecting seedlings from drought and domestic herbivory. Accordingly, transplanting seedlings of Saharan trees inside Panicum’s tussocks may promote substantially reforestation in degraded areas on a long-term scale. The leaves and shoots of this grass are palatable to livestock, and camels and donkeys will also eat it in the dry state.
