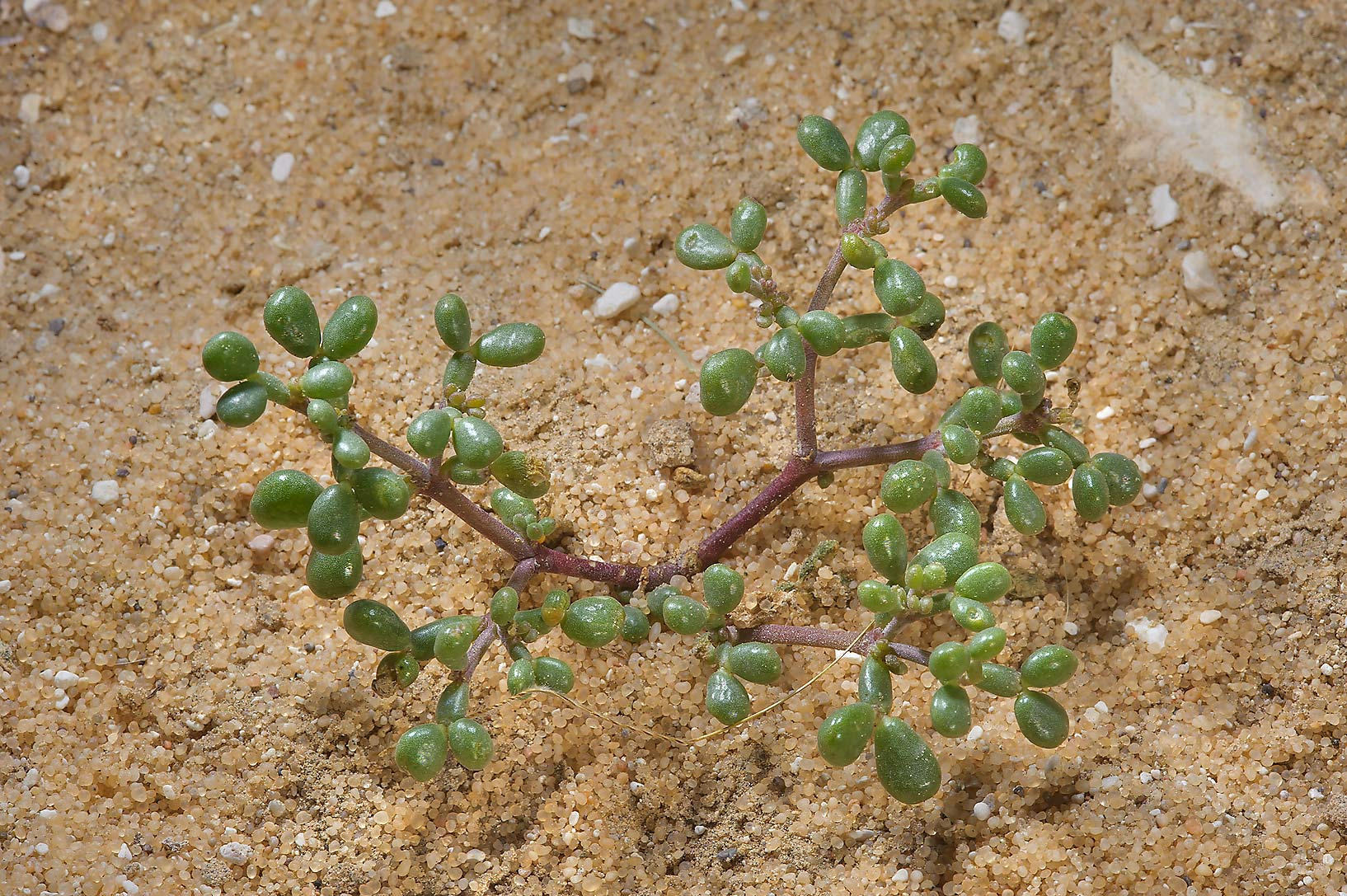

Scientific classification
- Kingdom: Plantae
- Clade: Tracheophytes
- Clade: Angiosperms
- Clade: Eudicots
- Clade: Rosids
- Order: Zygophyllales
- Family: Zygophyllaceae
- Genus: Zygophyllum
- Species: Z. qatarense

Binomial name
- Zygophyllum qatarense Hadidi

Synonyms
- Tetraena qatarensis (Hadidi) Beier & Thulin; Zygophyllum hamiense var. qatarense (Hadidi) Jac.Thomas & Chaudhary

= Zygophyllum qatarense =

Species of plant

Zygophyllum qatarense, synonym Tetraena qatarensis, is a salt-tolerant dwarf shrub that grows in the Arabian Peninsula. It has small compact leaves that store water. The leaflets grow in pairs and the flowers have four or five petals.

== Description ==
Zygophyllum qatarense is a dwarf shrub with multiple stems. It has tiny, fleshy leaves with paired leaflets which are deciduous, dropping off in stressful conditions. The flowers usually have five white or yellow petals (sometimes four), ten projecting stamens and a minute style. The fruits are capsules, splitting into five parts when ripe.

== Distribution and habitat ==
Zygophyllum qatarense is native to the Arabian Peninsula and occurs around the Persian Gulf and the Gulf of Oman. It typically grows in coarse, stony or sandy soils at the edge of saltflats, around salt marshes, and in the sand that accumulates on the base of depressions. It also grows in non-salty locations, on calcareous soils and around the fringes of dune areas, and often dominates plant communities in these locations. On well-drained sandy soil on coastal plains, Z. qatarense may cover 75% of the ground surface, and this plant community is probably the most commonly encountered around the western side of the Persian Gulf.

== Ecology ==
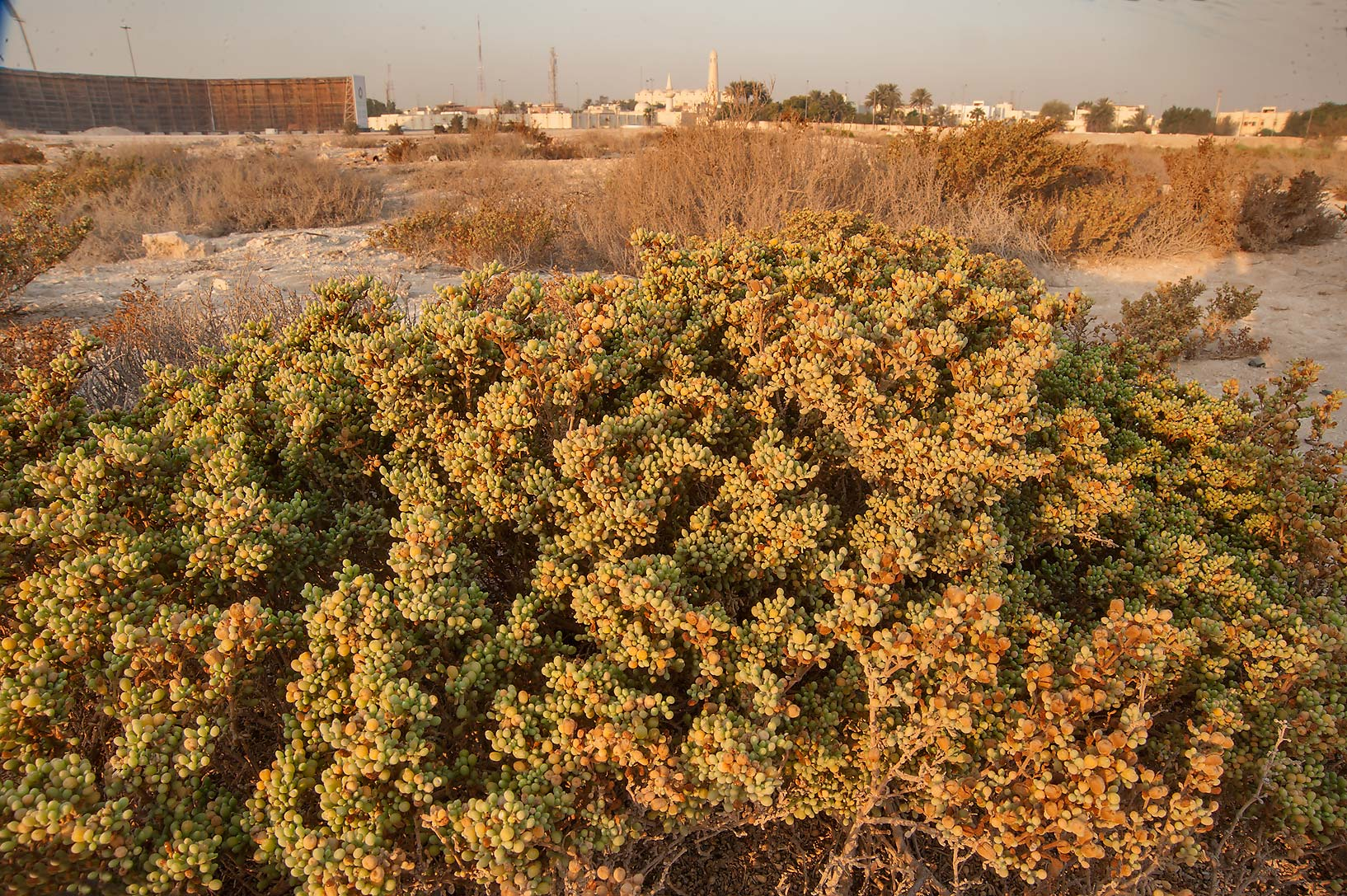
A large bush of Z. qatarense growing in a highly saline industrial wasteland in Doha, Qatar

Zygophyllum qatarense grows in arid conditions and is both drought and salt tolerant. In the Persian Gulf area the summer is very hot, any ground moisture present evaporates and the soil becomes increasingly salty. Under these conditions, the leaves dry up and fall off the plant, and it can survive in a leafless state for several years. When significant rain falls in winter, the soil becomes less salty and the plant is stimulated into new growth. The leaf structure and physiology also change with the season, with unifoliate xeromorphic leaves better able to withstand water loss being present during the summer. The seeds have tough coats and germination only occurs after significant rainfall. The plants are found growing in association with several species of soil microfungi, regularly with Cladosporium sphaerospermum, but also sometimes with Penicillium citrinum and Aspergillus fumigatus.
