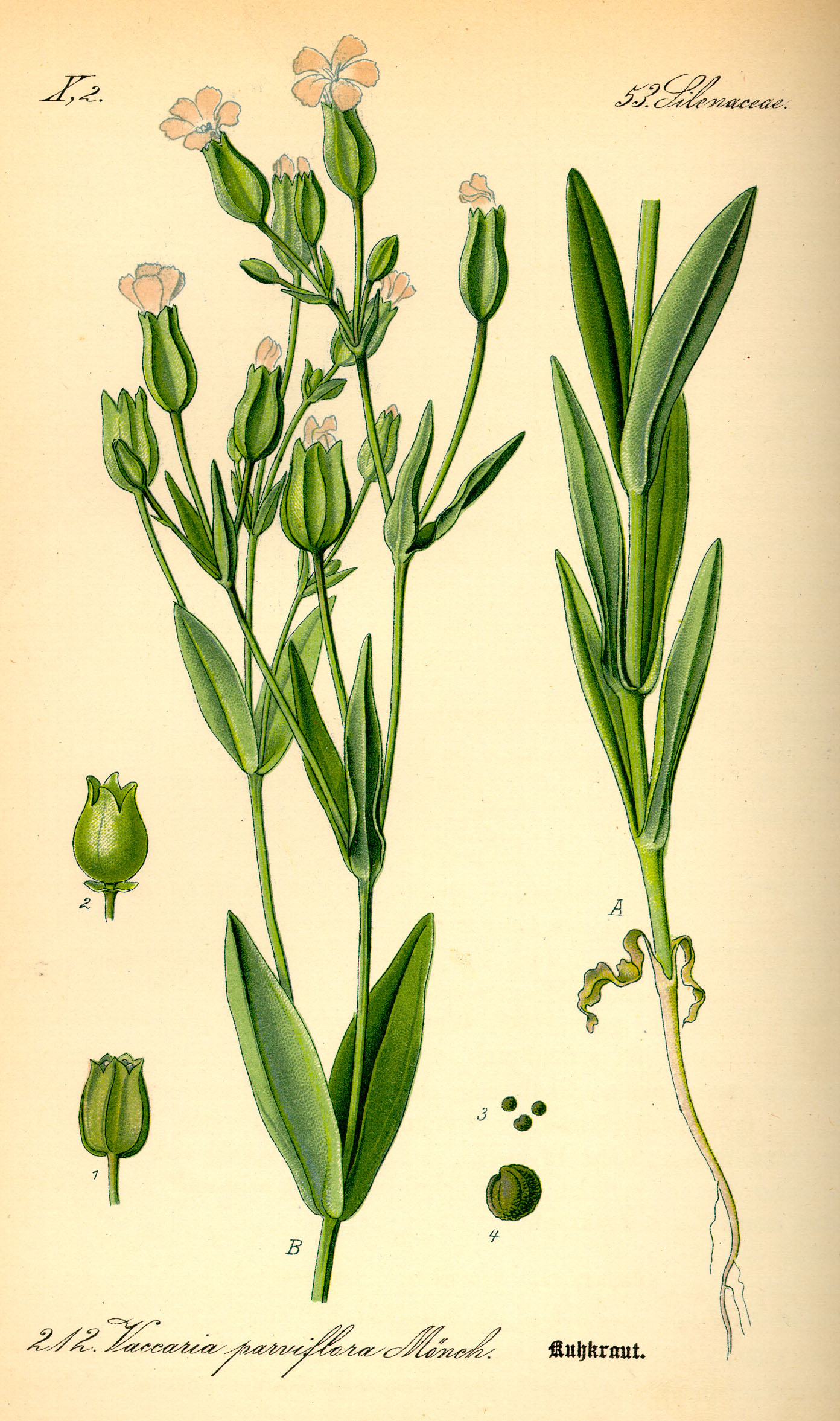

Scientific classification
- Kingdom: Plantae
- Clade: Tracheophytes
- Clade: Angiosperms
- Clade: Eudicots
- Order: Caryophyllales
- Family: Caryophyllaceae
- Genus: Gypsophila
- Species: G. vaccaria

Binomial name
- Gypsophila vaccaria (L.) Sm.

Synonyms
- Dianthus inclusus Walp.; Lychnis vaccaria (L.) Scop.; Saponaria amplissima Mill.; Saponaria hispanica Mill.; Saponaria inclusa K.Koch; Saponaria liniflora Boiss. & Hausskn.; Saponaria oxyodonta Boiss.; Saponaria pentagona Steud.; Saponaria perfoliata Roxb. ex Willd.; Saponaria rubra Lam., nom. superfl.; Saponaria segetalis Neck.; Saponaria vaccaria L.; Silene vaccaria E.H.L.Krause; Vaccaria arvensis Link, nom. superfl.; Vaccaria brachycalyx Pau; Vaccaria grandiflora Jaub. & Spach; Vaccaria hispanica (Mill.) Rauschert; Vaccaria hispanica subsp. grandiflora (Ser.) Holub; Vaccaria hispanica subsp. liniflora (Boiss. & Hausskn.) Greuter & Burdet; Vaccaria hispanica subsp. oxyodonta (Boiss.) Greuter & Burdet; Vaccaria hispanica subsp. pyramidata (Medik.) Holub; Vaccaria hispanica subsp. vaccaria (L.) P.Eliáš; Vaccaria inclusa Ledeb.; Vaccaria liniflora (Boiss. & Hausskn.) Bornm.; Vaccaria oxyodonta Boiss.; Vaccaria parviflora Moench; Vaccaria perfoliata (Roxb. ex Willd.) Sweet; Vaccaria pyramidalis Prahl; Vaccaria pyramidata Medik.; Vaccaria pyramidata subsp. grandiflora (Ser.) Hayek; Vaccaria segetalis (Neck.) Garcke ex Asch.; Vaccaria segetalis subsp. pyramidata (Medik.) Dostál; Vaccaria sessilifolia Sweet, nom. superfl.; Vaccaria vaccaria (L.) Huth, not validly publ.; Vaccaria vulgaris Host, nom. superfl.

= Gypsophila vaccaria =

Genus of flowering plants

Gypsophila vaccaria is a species of flowering plant in the family Caryophyllaceae. It is native from Portugal and Morocco to the Himalayas, and has been introduced into temperate areas worldwide. Among its many synonyms is Vaccaria hispanica, which was the only species placed in the genus Vaccaria. It is known by several common names including cowherb, cowcockle, cow basil, cow soapwort, and prairie carnation. It is an annual herb with blue-gray, waxy herbage and pale pink flowers.

The seeds of the species are used in Chinese medicine.
