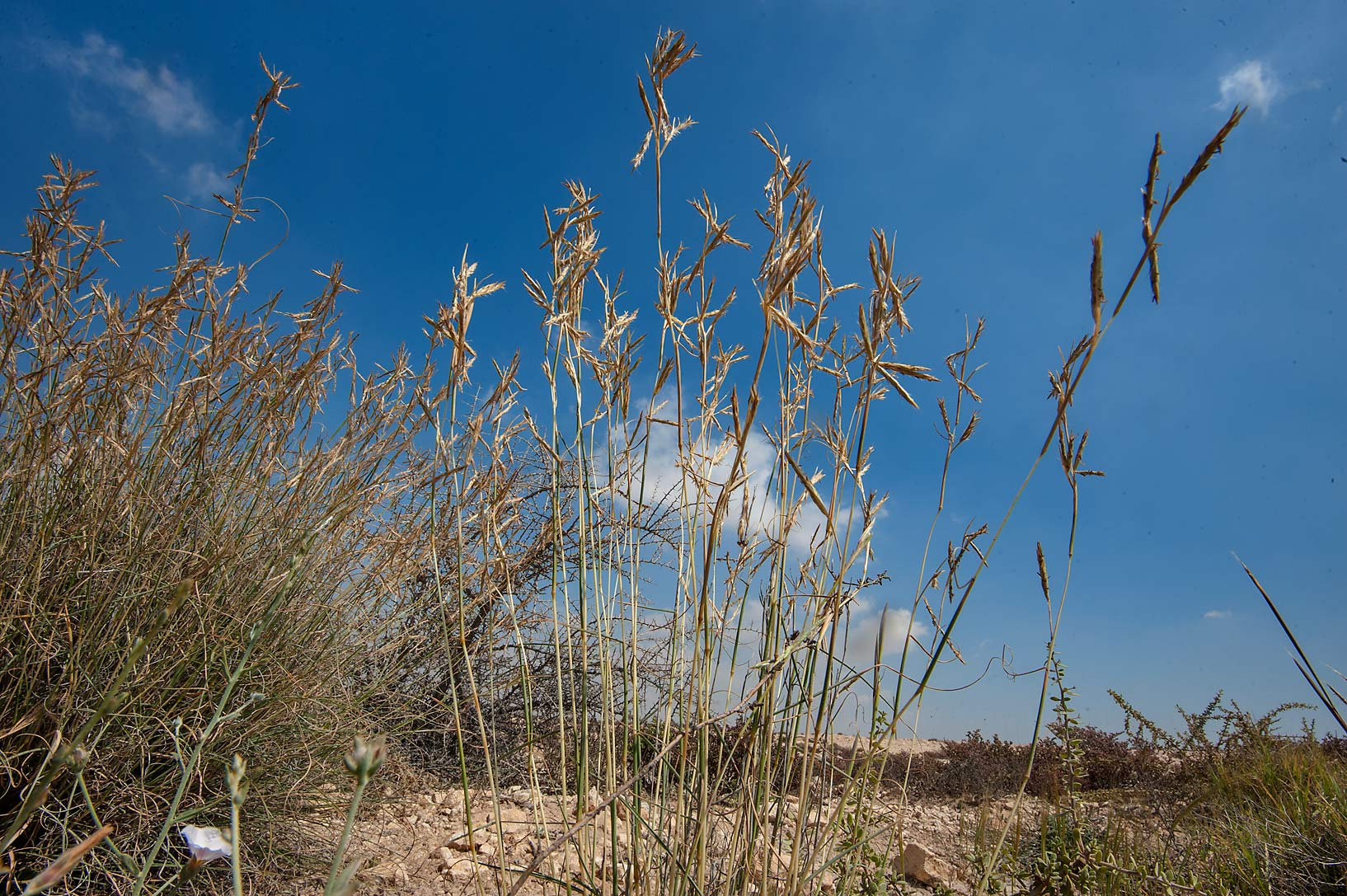

Scientific classification
- Kingdom: Plantae
- Clade: Tracheophytes
- Clade: Angiosperms
- Clade: Monocots
- Clade: Commelinids
- Order: Poales
- Family: Poaceae
- Subfamily: Panicoideae
- Genus: Cymbopogon
- Species: C. commutatus

Binomial name
- Cymbopogon commutatus (Steud.) Stapf.

Synonyms
- Cymbopogon parkeri Steud.

= Cymbopogon commutatus =

Species of plant

Cymbopogon commutatus is a perennial grass species, commonly known as incense grass, aromatic rush, camel's hay, or lemon grass. Its range extends from South Asia to parts of Africa and Arabia. Foliage has a sweet lemony odor when mashed. It appeared on a 4 riyal Qatari stamp. It is used for medicinal purposes in northeastern Arabia.

Cymbopogon commutatus has been used as a component in soap, as it produces citronella oil. Cymbopogon commutatus is also used to create insect repellant.
