= Archaeology of Qatar =

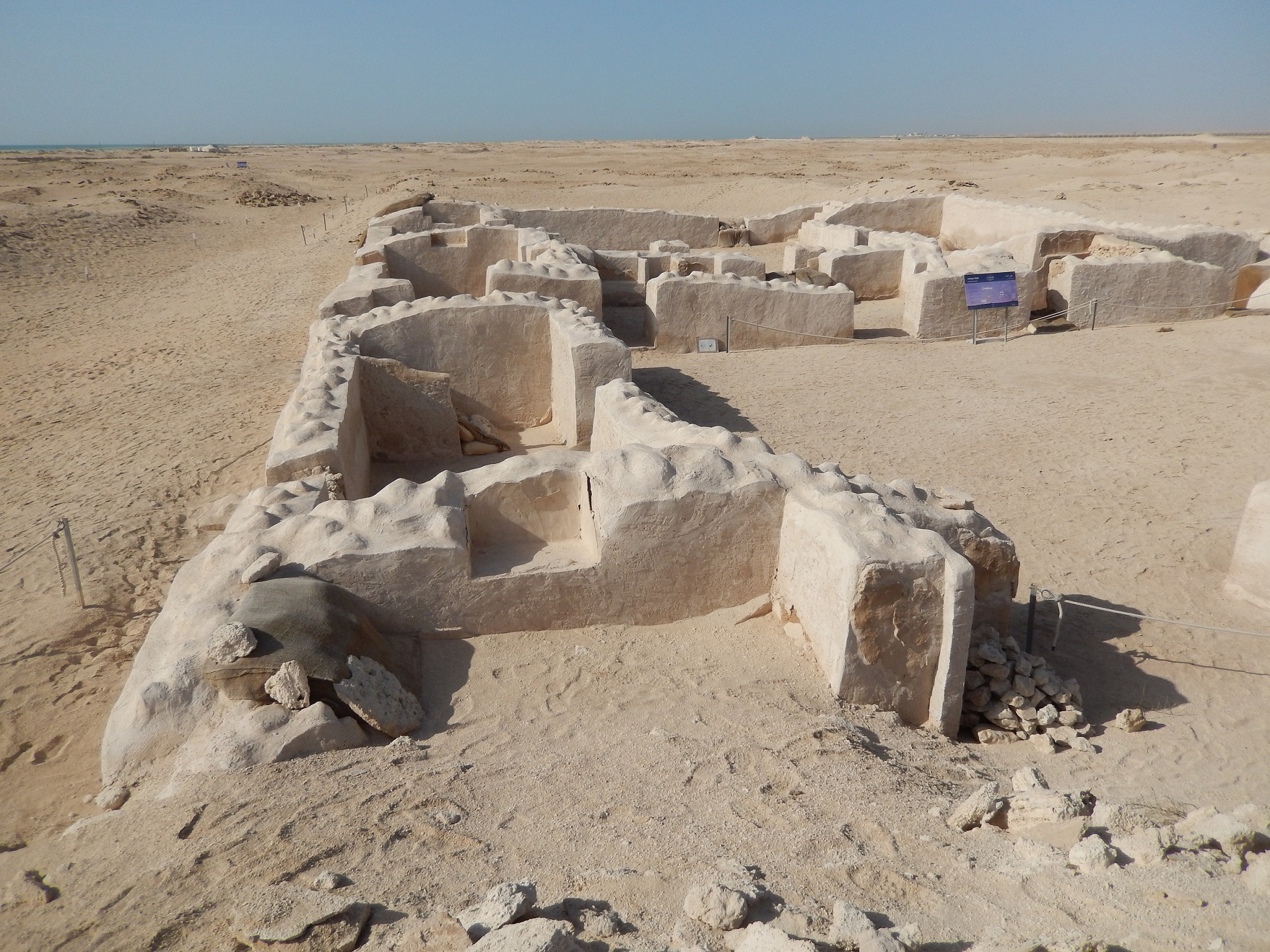
The archaeological site of Zubarah

Archaeology of Qatar as a field study began in 1956. Three major expeditions were carried out in Qatar throughout the mid-20th century, with the first being launched by a Danish team who began work in the 1950s. This was followed by British and French expeditions in 1970s and 1980s, respectively. Approximately 200 archaeological sites were discovered during these expeditions, with the most extensive being the coastal areas of Al Da'asa, Ras Abrouq and Al Khor Island. Artifacts such as flint tools, Ubaid and Barbar pottery and encampments were found on site.

Apart from the discovery of ancient artifacts, many prehistoric rock art sites containing over 900 varieties of petroglyphs were uncovered during the 1950s and 1960s. Most carvings are cup and ring marks. These are accompanied by less numerous depictions of animals, boats and symbols.

The Qatar National Museum was established in Doha in 1975. Qatar passed an antiquities law in 1980 to protect its archaeological sites. In the late 2000s, the Qatar Museums Authority began organizing joint archaeological projects with numerous European universities and institutions.

== Expeditions ==
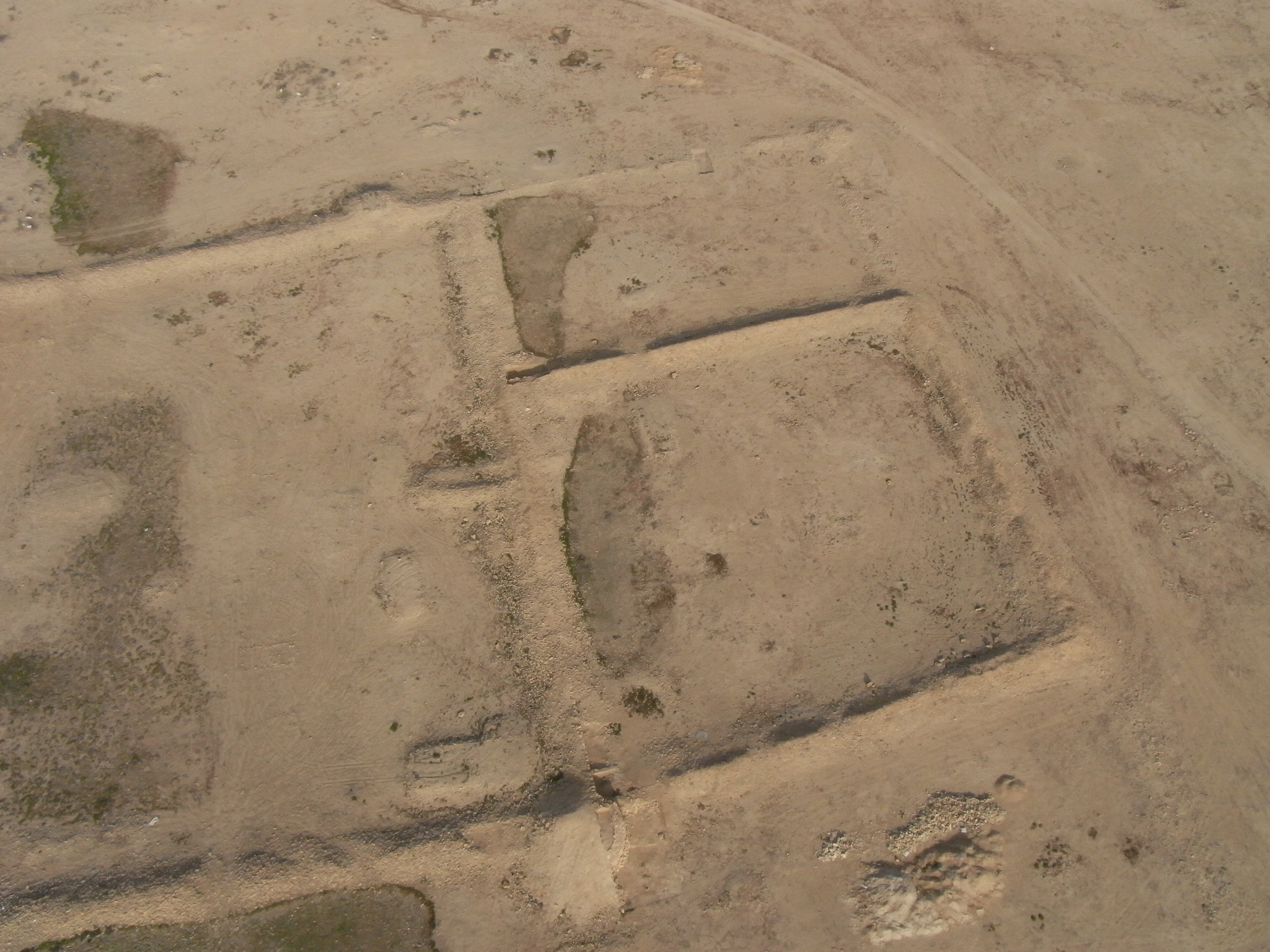
Archaeological site of Ruwayda

Along with Bahrain, Qatar was excavated 1878 by British officer, Captain Edward Law Durand. It was the first archaeological research mission to take place in the country.

Beginning in 1956, large-scale archaeological excavation programs were launched by the government in various parts of the country. That year, Geoffrey Bibby and Peter Glob embarked on an expedition in Qatar where they discovered two Paleolithic sites in Ras Uwainat Ali (about 10 km north of Dukhan). In 1957, a Danish team organized a comprehensive survey on the peninsula which uncovered 11 sites, most of which were situated along the coast. They recovered flint from the newly discovered sites, in addition to collecting artifacts from the sites discovered a year prior by Bibby and Glob.

The excavations continued in the proceeding years, unearthing additional Paleolithic sites and Neolithic occupational sites. In 1960, under the supervision of Holger Kapel and Hans Jørgen Madsen, the Danes excavated the most significant yet-discovered archaeological site in the peninsula, located approximately 5 km south of Dukhan. The site contained a large concentration of flint tools, which included arrowheads, knives and scrapers. The Danish expedition ended in 1964.

A British team led by Beatrice de Cardi undertook expeditions from November 1973 to January 1974 to collect artifacts for the establishment of a national museum. Their most significant find was the site of Al Da'asa, which contained numerous Ubaid potsherds.

The Mission Archéologique Français à Qatar, a French team led by Jacques Tixier, surveyed and excavated several sites in Qatar beginning in 1976. The French excavations ended by 1982. They published their findings in two volumes. The first volume was written by Jacques Tixier in 1980, with the other being published by Marie-Louise Inizan in 1988.

From 1988 to 1991, the Japanese Archaeological Mission to the Persian Gulf surveyed the area. The mission comprised Masatoshi A Konishi, Takeshi Gotoh and Yoshihiko Akashi. They made major contributions towards the study of the Umm Al Maa site.

=== Recent cooperative projects ===
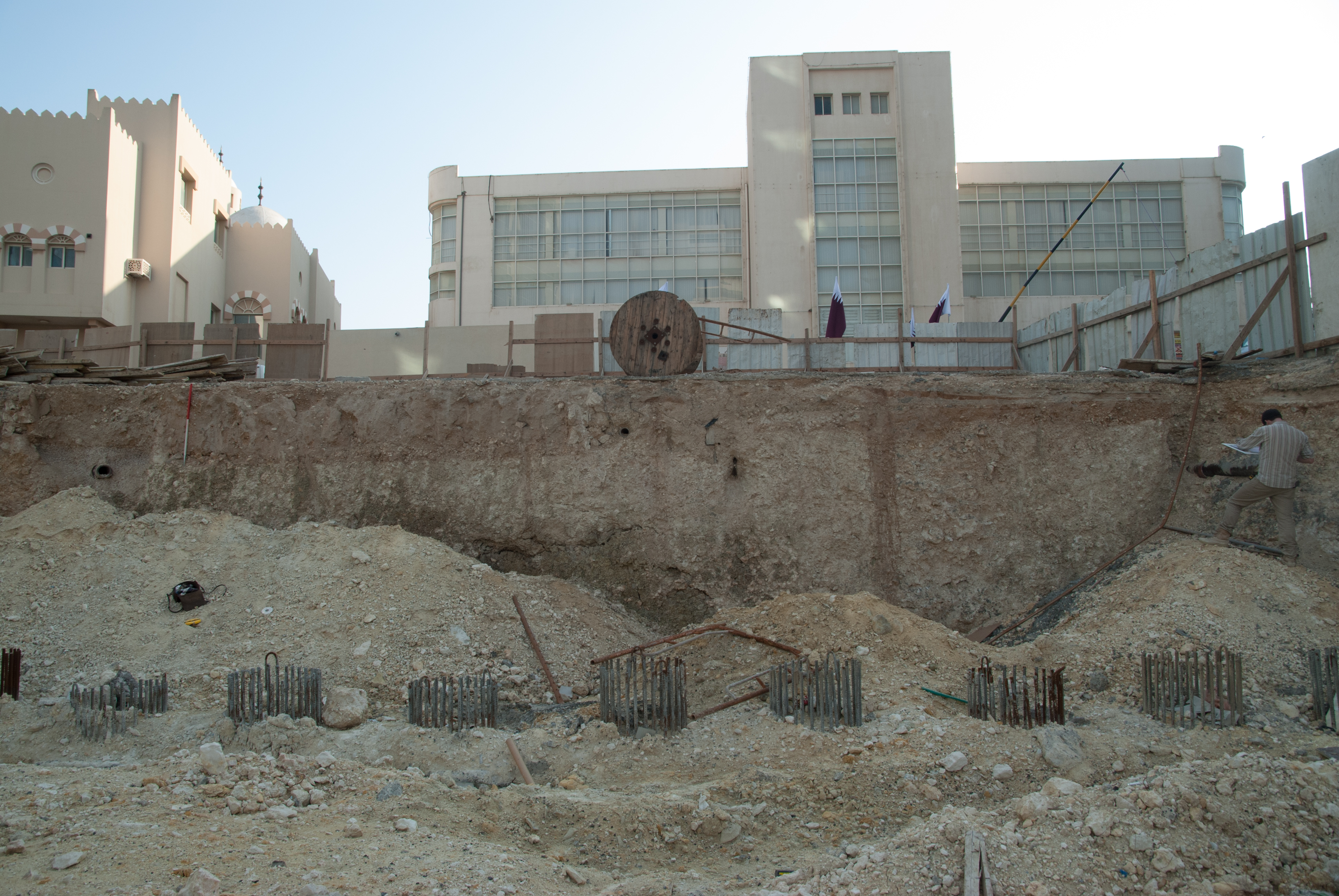
Excavations taking place in Doha in 2020, coordinated by the UCL.

A five-year collaboration between the University of Birmingham and the Qatar Museums Authority began in 2008. The project was named 'The Qatar National Historic Environment Record'. It researched and documented terrestrial and marine areas in Qatar.

In 2009, the Qatar Museums Authority initiated the Qatar Islamic Archaeology and Heritage Project (QIAH) in tandem with the University of Copenhagen. The main focus of the project was the historic town of Zubarah and nearby settlements. Zubarah was designated a UNESCO World Heritage Site in 2013.

The Wales Qatar Archaeological Project was launched in 2010 as a collaboration between the University of Wales Trinity Saint David, QIAH and the Qatar Museums Authority. The project's main focus was coastal sites in northern Qatar, including Ruwayda and Rubayqa.

In 2010, the University College London opened a campus in Doha following an agreement with Qatar Foundation and Qatar Museums Authority. As part of the agreement, UCL will provide training for the Qatar Museums Authority and conduct joint excavations. UCL announced its 'Origins of Doha' project in 2012 which aims to investigate the archaeological record of Qatar's capital city.

The German Archaeological Institute and Qatar Museums Authority reached an agreement in 2012. As part of the agreement, the German Archaeological Institute conducted surveys and excavations in the southern portion of Qatar. Joint training of Qatari and German archaeologists was also included in the agreement.

== National Museum ==
Plans for a national museum were drawn up in the 1970s. It was inaugurated in Doha in 1975, shortly after the excavations led by de Cardi. The antiquities department had an active role in surveys and excavations thereafter. They excavated the sites of Al Wusail and Zubarah. In 2005, the Qatar Museums Authority was established.

== Classification of archaeological periods ==
Archaeological periods (proposed by Muhammad Abdul Nayeem)
Starting date (BC)	Archaeological period	Significant sites
c. 1,000,000	Palaeolithic	Dukhan, Al Khor, Tuwair Al Huraithi, Umm Taqa, Sawda Natheel, Ras Abrouq, Juleia, Ras Uwainat Ali, Ras Abu Umran, Bir Hussain, Umm Bab, Mesaieed, Zugain Al Bahatha
c. 8,000	Neolithic	Al Wusail, Al Bahatha, Asaila, Areiy, Al Jubeigib, Al Wakrah, Dukhan, Shagra, Al Da'asa, Al Khor Island, Al Khor, Ras Abrouq
c. 2,000	Bronze Age	Al Da'asa, Ras Abrouq, Bir Hussain, Al Jubeigib, Nakhsh, Quasaira, Ras Uwainat Ali, Al Wusail, Al Khor Island, Al Khor
c. 1,000	Iron Age	Murwab, Ras Abrouq, Al Wusail, Al Khor Island, Al Khor, Umm Al Maa

== Distribution of archaeological sites ==
Prehistoric settlers often selected sites based on water availability. Areas marked by large depressions or with substantial groundwater tend to yield the highest propensity of archaeological findings. In Qatar, the northern sector contains a higher-quality groundwater supply than does the south, thus, historically, more permanent settlements were founded in the north, particularly near the coast. Conversely, the south section is typified by temporary nomadic outposts which were most likely constructed during periods of favorable weather that would enable access to surface or groundwater. In some cases, areas with no potable water would still be regularly visited by nomadic herdsman as the water would be safe to drink for their camels.

Southern archaeological sites such as Shagra and Asaila, which are also two of the oldest Neolithic sites in the peninsula, are exceptions to the poor water supply in this region as they are located next to depressions.

== Paleolithic findings ==
The Danish team uncovered a temporary encampment at Al Wusail in 1957. They posited it to be a late Paleolithic site used by hunters, as supported by the numerous flint tools found on site. It was again excavated in 1989 and 1991 by a Qatari team.

In 1961, the Danish archaeological team excavated approximately 30,000 stone implements from 122 paleolithic sites. Most of the sites were situated along the coastline. Macrolithic tools such as scrapers, arrowheads and hand axes dating to the Lower and Middle Paleolithic periods were among the discoveries.

Holger Kapel classified 68 Paleolithic sites into four cultural groups based on flint typology, designating letter terms to each group, in 1964. In 1967, he revised the nomenclature of the four groups. Group A was deemed to be the oldest culture, with Group C following behind, leaving Groups B and D as the most recent culture groups. Tools from Group A were found at elevations 250–300 feet (76–91 meters) above sea level, Group C tools were found at elevations 25–40 feet (7.6–12.2 meters), and Group D tools occurred roughly a few feet above sea level.

=== Taqan culture ===
In 1964, the Danish group discovered a tool making site at Umm Taqa. Lead archaeologist Holger Kapel claimed that there was no site like it elsewhere in the peninsula. Archaeologist G.H. Smith, who partook in the later British expedition, suggested that Umm Taqa belonged to a distinct culture.

A survey conducted in 2013–14 designates the tool making industry as the 'Taqan industry' and dates it to the Upper Paleolithic. Lithic assemblages at the site consisted of 359 pieces. A variance of the Taqan industry from the other groups classified by Kapel was the method used to prepare blade cores.

== Neolithic findings ==
=== Pottery ===
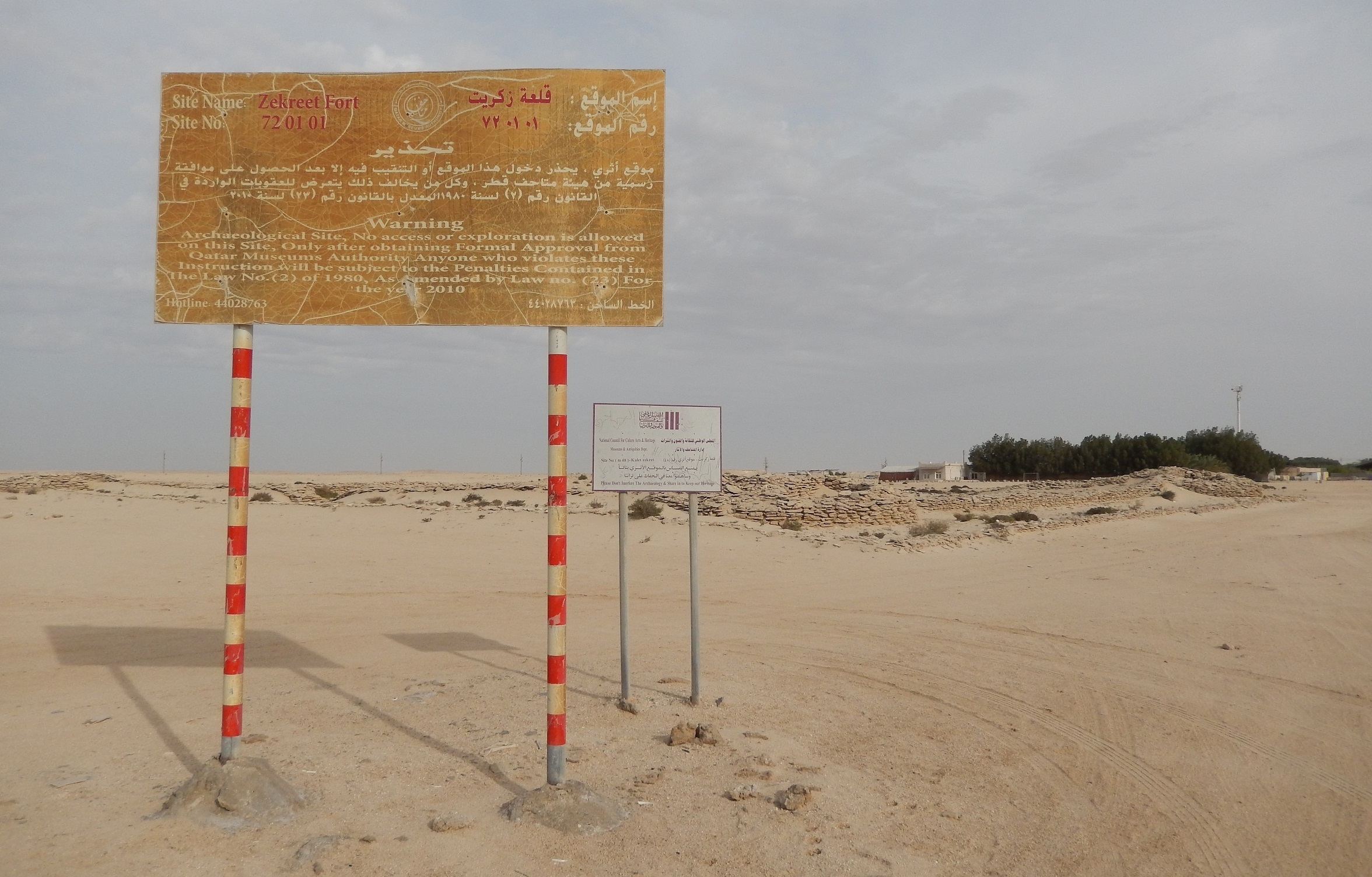
A protected archaeological site in Zekreet.

Ubaid pottery originating from Mesopotamia was discovered in five primary sites in Qatar: Al Da'asa, Ras Abrouq (Bir Zekrit), Al Jubeigib and Al Khor Island. The two most extensive Ubaid sites in the peninsula are found in Al Da'asa and Ras Abrouq. Comparative analysis revealed that at least half of the excavated pottery originated from southern Mesopotamia, mainly from the sites of Eridu, Ur and Tell al-'Ubaid.

The Ubaid period transpired from c. 6500 BC to 3800 BC. The pottery in Ras Abrouq consists of fragments of rims of painted jars and bowls and is dated to the late fourth millennium. The majority of pottery recovered in Al Da'asa dates to the early Ubaid period.

=== Settlements ===
One of the oldest yet-discovered settlements was found in 2009 on the northwest coast in Wadi Debayan. Carbon dating of organic remains revealed human habitation dating back 7500 years. It is thought to have been occupied over a stretch of 5000 years before being abandoned sometime in the Bronze Age. Remnants of marine life, plant material and structural components were among the artifacts found on site. Fragments of pottery originating from the early Ubaid period were also recovered.

Ras Abrouq, on the western shoreline, contained a ring-like structure, hearths, Ubaid pottery, cairns, and stone tools. In addition, many fish bones and snail shells were recovered. G.H. Smith, an excavator of the site, suggested that it was a seasonal encampment and that its inhabitants had trade relations with nearby civilizations.

=== The Dark Millennium ===
Most of the fourth millennium BC and parts of the third millennium BC have been dubbed the 'Dark Millennium'. Coinciding with the decline of the Ubaid period cultures, this period is characterized by a scarcity of archaeological remnants. Archaeologists have attributed this lapse to a lowering of lake levels and increasing desertification around this time, both of which impacted the peninsula's arability and discouraged sedentary lifestyles.

== Bronze Age findings ==
=== Pottery ===
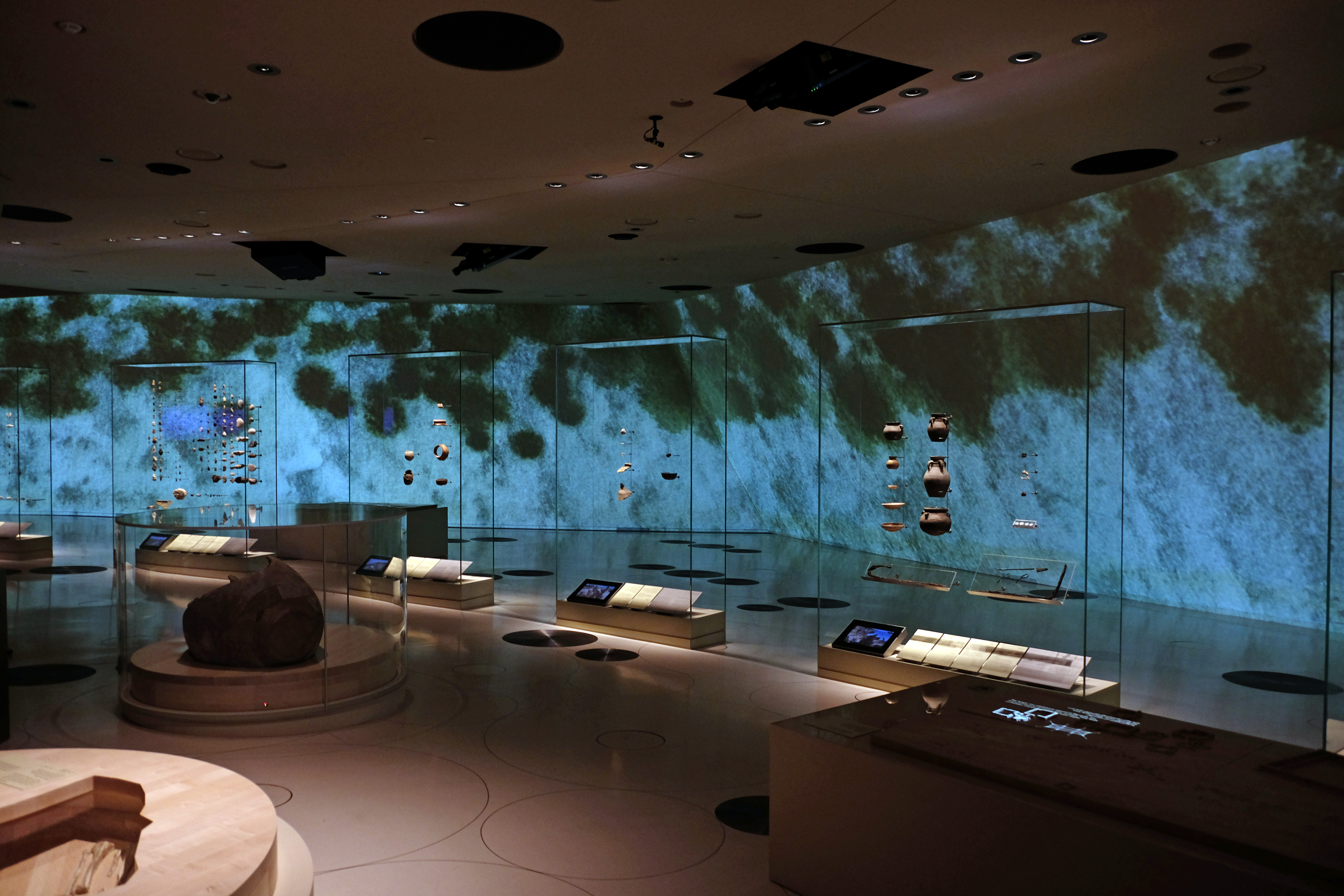
Artifacts in the National Museum of Qatar

Excavations in Ras Abrouq and Al Khor Island yielded Barbar ceramics originating from the Dilmun civilization dating to the third millennium BC. A 1977 expedition discovered non-Barbar pottery in Al Khor Island, also dating to the third millennium BC, with geometrical patterns similar to the pottery of the Umm an-Nar culture in the present-day United Arab Emirates. The ceramics documented in Al Khor Island consist of medium-sized jars and cooking pots.

Three fragments of red pottery, thought to originate from the Arabian coast, were discovered in excavations conducted in Al Da'asa in 1973.

=== Other objects ===
Excavations of chambered cairns in Ras Abrouq revealed 108 beads made of stone and shell. A bead made of carnelian, which is foreign to Qatar, was found in a hearth in Al Da'asa. A plethora of jewelry made with beads dating to the mid-Bronze Age were uncovered by a French expedition in Al Khor in 1976. The beads were of different sizes and were made from materials such as obsidian, carnelian and bone.

A single bronze arrowhead was found on the east coast of Qatar in Al Wusail.

=== Settlements and industry ===
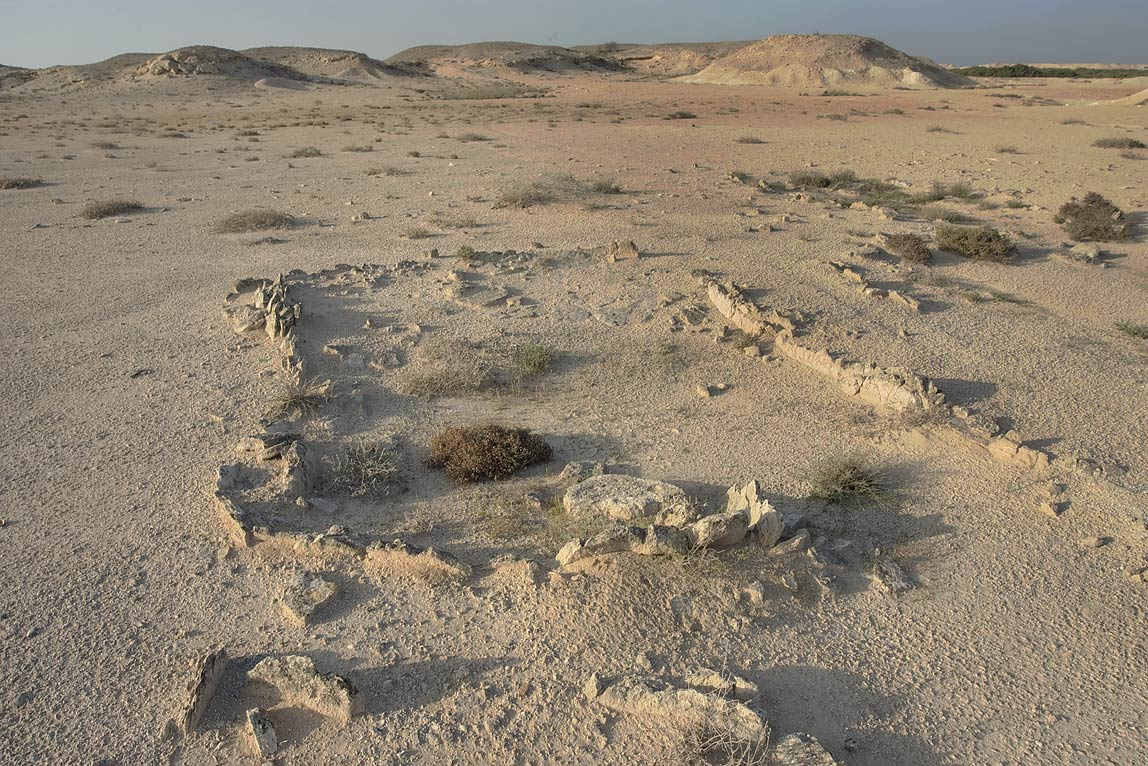
Excavation of the Kassite dye site on Al Khor Island.

A settlement in Al Wusail was carbon dated to 2000 BC by a Japanese team who carried out excavations in 1995. It is purported to be a fishing settlement due to the large number of fish bones and sea shells at the site.

The Kassites operated a purple dye industry on Al Khor Island from c. 1400 BC to c. 1100 BC. Between 1980 and 1982, the French expedition found 3,000,000 crushed snail shells and Kassite potsherds on the islands.

== Iron Age findings ==
A burial site containing 50 cairns, found in northwest Qatar in Umm Al Maa and Lisha, dates back to the Iron Age. It was first discovered and excavated by the Danish archaeological team in 1957. The Danes measured the cairns to be 10 metres (33 feet) in diameter and roughly a meter (3 feet) in height. The Japanese Archaeological Mission later excavated the site from 1988 to 1991. In the later period of excavations, they discovered two burial complexes containing a chain of burial mounds.

Two of the burial mounds contained skeletons with iron arrowheads and an iron sword by their side. Further discovered burial sites contained grave goods such as potsherds, jewelry, and metal fragments. Most of the burial sites were plundered by grave robbers. The site falls in a period between 300 BC and 300 AD. An excavation team in 2008–09 noted that the mounds may have been built by local nomads.

To date, no archaeological evidence of Iron Age settlements have been discovered in the peninsula. This is likely due to adverse climatic changes rendering Qatar less inhabitable during this period.

== Nestorian sites ==
=== Qasr Al Malehat ===
A site on the south-east coast of Qatar, near Al Wakrah, revealed the remnants of a structure purported to be a church. It was built directly on limestone bedrock and a hearth was found inside the ruins. Radiocarbon dating indicates the site was occupied in the early 7th century AD, and potsherds recovered from the surrounding area evidences continued occupation until the mid to late 8th century. The ceramics are consistent with those found in other Nestorian sites in the Eastern Arabia and the structure bears resemblance to the excavated Jubail Church in Jubail, eastern Saudi Arabia.

=== Umm Al Maradim ===
An excavation carried out in 2013 uncovered a Nestorian cross in Umm Al Maradim, a site in central Qatar. The cross is made of hard stone and measures between 3 and 4 cm (1.2 and 1.6 in). A number of hearths and potsherds were found at the site, though no structures were discovered.

== Islamic sites ==
Settlements dating to the Abbasid-period (750–1253) were mostly intended to be permanent sites of occupation. A cluster of Abbasid archaeological sites are found near the north-west coast and include Ar Rakiyat, Umm Al Kilab, Ghaf Makin, Mussaykah, Murwab, and Al-Haddiyah. Structures that were excavated at these sites were roughly aligned with Mecca. All of the sites are situated next to rawdas (depressions), ensuring a reliable water supply.

From around the 10th century to 16th century, there was a trend in adoption of a nomadic Bedouin lifestyle, causing a decline in settlements. However, around the 16th and 17th centuries, towns such as Al Huwaila and Zubarah were founded.

== Rock art ==
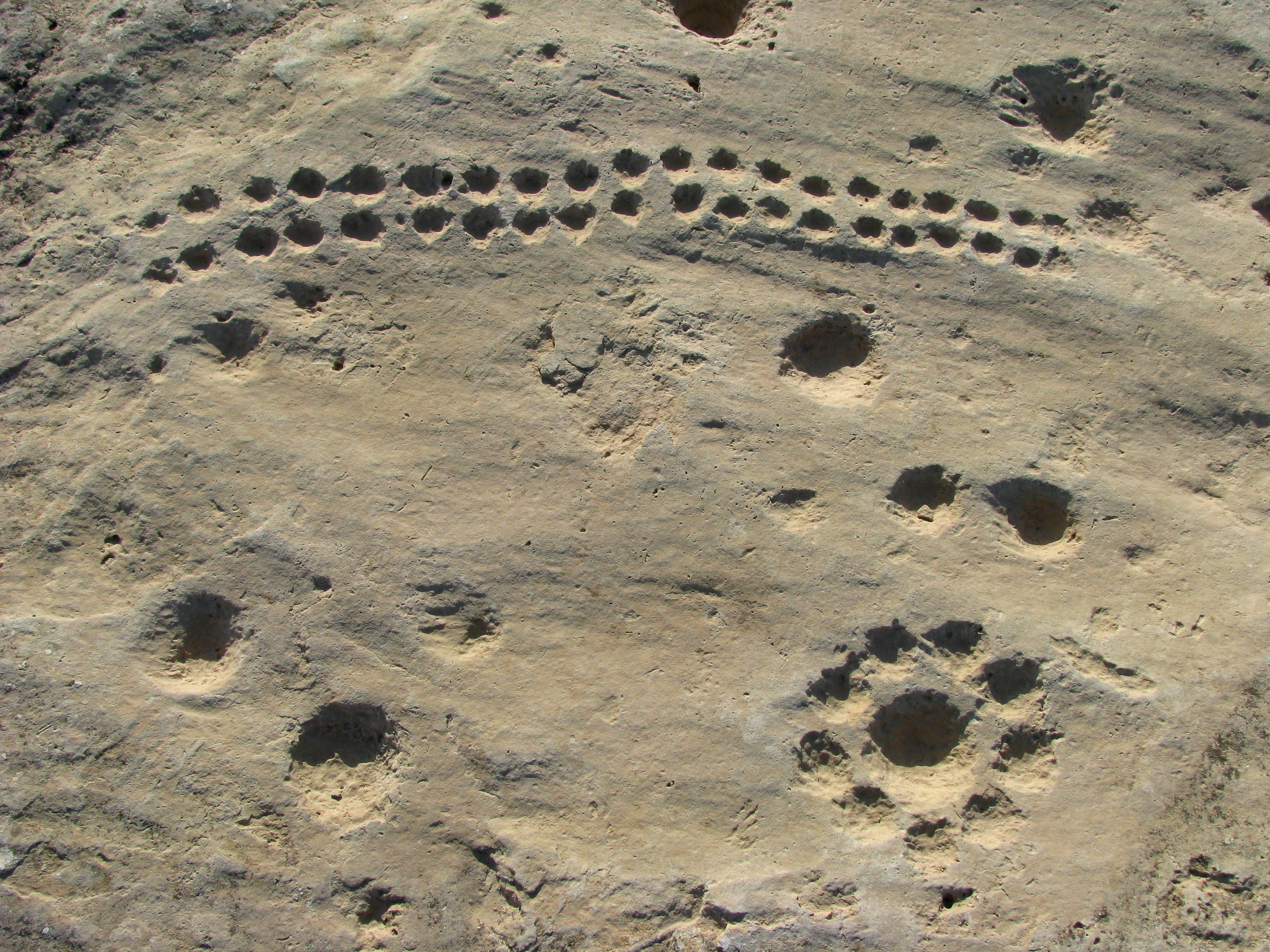
Dot carvings at Jebel Jassassiyeh.

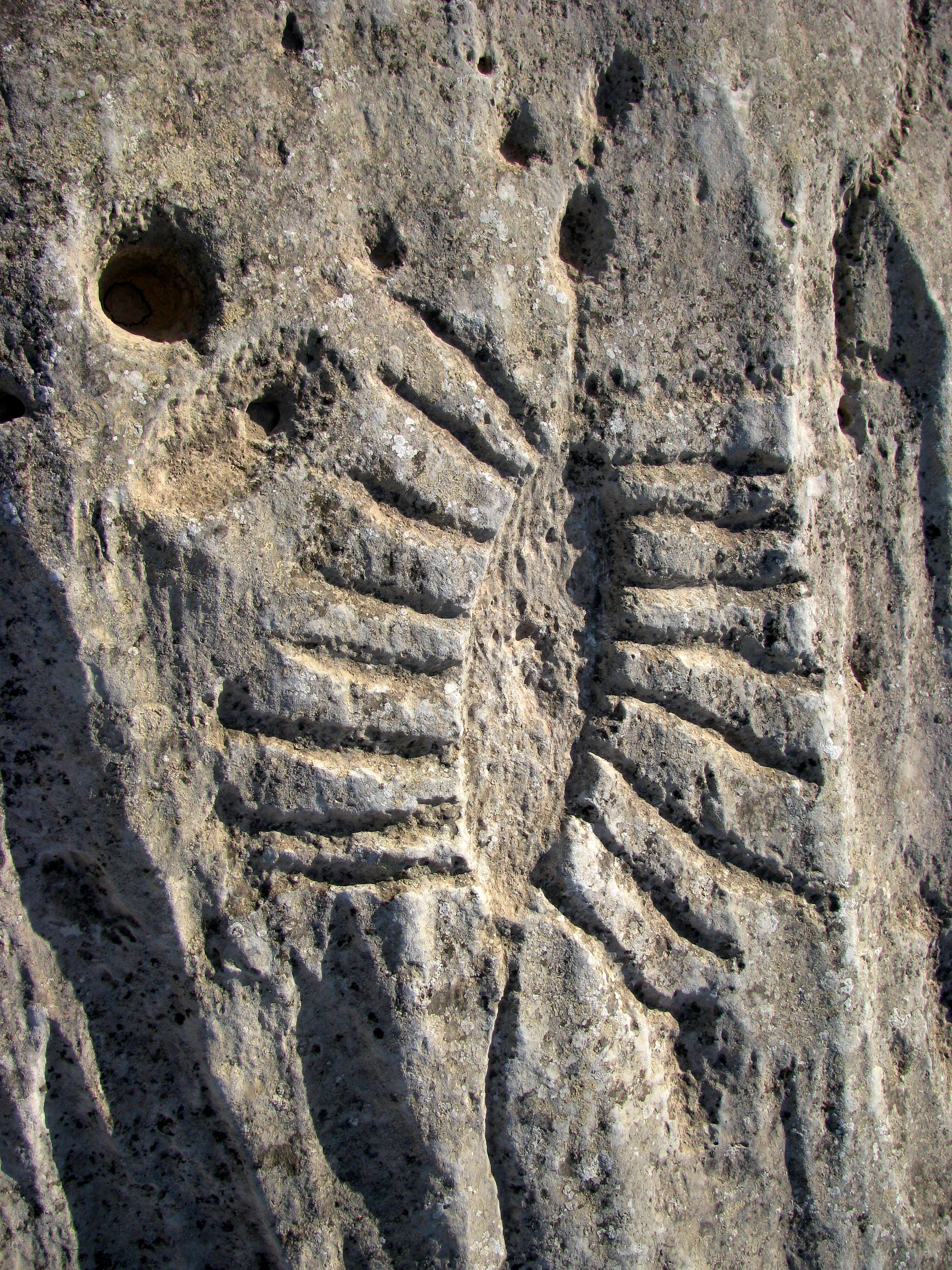
Rock carvings in Jebel Jassassiyeh depicting an object.

Ancient rock carvings have been discovered in eight separate locations: Jebel Jassassiyeh, Jebel Fuwayrit, Freiha, Al Ghariyah, Al Jumail, Simaisma, Al Wakrah and Al Qassar. Most of these sites were discovered by Danish archaeological teams in the 1950s and 1960s. The rock carvings are classified in a number of categories, including human and animal representation, boat representation, cup-marks, large cavities, geometric designs, tribal marks, and hand and footprints.

=== Jebel Jassassiyeh ===
A large number of rock carvings were discovered by the Danish team in Jebel Jassassiyeh, in northeast Qatar, in 1961. Variations in motifs and technique indicates that the carvings were made through various historical periods.

Cup-marks are the most common forms of art among the nearly 900 carvings. Other carvings include ships, animals, foot-prints and tribal marks (known as wasum). Different animals are depicted, such as ostriches, turtles and fish. A large number carvings illustrate boats. The boats are of different sizes and types, and some contain oars while others do not.

Jebel Jassassiyeh is the only rock art site in Qatar where boat depictions have been recorded. The dating of the boat carvings is inconclusive, though archaeologist Muhammad Abdul Nayeem tentatively dated them to the third century BC. However, a study conducted in 2012 which tested nine samples of carvings, including boat carvings, concluded that the oldest of the samples had a minimum age of less than 300 years. The study found no evidence to support the view of the carvings dating back millenniums.

In later carvings, the boats appeared with sails. In some of the rock carvings, sails appear without boats. Some of the ancient carvings were modified at later periods, with devices such as ropes and anchors being added.

=== Freiha ===
In 1956, Geoffrey Bibby and Peter Glob discovered several hundred cup-marks carved in rock in Freiha. Their sizes range from cm5 to 23 cm (2.0 to 9.1 in) and have depths of 1 to 10 cm (0.39 to 3.94 in), with most being 5 cm (2.0 in) in diameter and having a depth of 1 to 3 cm (0.39 to 1.18 in). Bibby and Glob noted that the cup-marks are similar to those found in Bahrain dating to the Dilmun period. Several hand and footprints were also documented in Freiha.

Geometrical designs were recorded at Freiha in four places. They measure 11 to 15 cm (4.3 to 5.9 in) in width and 11 to 12 cm (4.3 to 4.7 in) in height. Peter Glob believed that they were carved by an ancient fertility cult. This theory was disputed by Muhammad Abdul Nayeem, who believes that they are simply abstract symbols or tribal marks.

=== Al Qassar ===
Al Qassar, a site 5 km (3.1 mi) northeast of Doha, was found to have rock carvings of human and animals by an excavation team in 1979. Most of them have been eroded beyond recognition. Stone blocks containing still-recognizable carvings were cut off and transported to the Qatar National Museum for preservation.

One petroglyph, which contains two different panels carved by more than one individual, depicts two horse riders and a camel. The riders, one behind the other, are holding lances in their upraised hands. The second rider appears to be chasing the first, as his lance is pointed towards the other rider's back. The figure of the second rider is leaning in a forward position, with the lance projecting from his upper body. In front of the riders is a camel with incomplete body features. Muhammad Abdul Nayeem dates the carving to the second millennium BC.

== See also ==
- List of historical monuments in Qatar

== Bibliography ==
- Abdul Nayeem, Muhammad (1998). Qatar Prehistory and Protohistory from the Most Ancient Times (Ca. 1,000,000 to End of B.C. Era). Hyderabad Publishers. ISBN 978-81-85492-04-9.
- De Cardi, Beatrice (1978). Qatar Archaeological Report. Excavations 1973. Oxford University Press. ISBN 978-0-19-920078-8.
