= List of tourist attractions in Qatar =

Qatar is one of the fastest growing countries in the field of tourism. According to the World Tourism rankings, more than 2.3 million international tourists visited Qatar in 2017. Qatar has become one of the most open countries in the Middle East due to its recent visa facilitation improvements, including allowing nationals of 88 countries to enter visa-free and free-of charge.

Popular tourist attractions in Qatar include the following:

== Attractions ==
=== Amusement Parks ===
- Angry Birds World
- Doha Quest
- Gondolania Theme Park
- Meryal Waterpark

=== Archaeological sites ===
- Al Da'asa
- Al Khor Island
- Jebel Jassassiyeh
- Lehsain
- Murwab
- Ras Abrouq
- Ruwayda
- Umm Al Maa
- Wadi Debayan
- Zubarah

=== Beaches ===
- Al Ghariyah Beach
- Al Thakhira Beach
- Dukhan Beach
- Fuwairit Beach
- Khor Al Adaid
- Ras Abrouq Beach
- Umm Bab Beach
- Zubarah Beach
- Maroona Beach
- Al Farkiya beach
- Simaisma Family Beach
- Al Wakra Beach
- Sealine Beach
- Al Kharij Beach
- Katara Beach

=== Forts ===
- Al Khor Towers
- Al Wajbah Fort
- Al Zubara Fort
- Ar Rakiyat Fort
- Barzan Towers
- Doha Fort
- Qal'at Murair

=== Museums ===
- Mathaf: Arab Museum of Modern Art
- Museum of Islamic Art, Doha
- National Museum of Qatar
- Sheikh Faisal Bin Qassim Al Thani Museum

=== National parks ===
- Al Reem Biosphere Reserve
- Al Wabra Wildlife Preserve
- Umm Tais National Park

=== Parks ===
- Al Bidda Park
- Aspire Park

=== Shopping centres ===
Doha

- Doha Festival City
- Landmark Mall Doha
- Souq Waqif
- Villaggio Mall

Al Rayyan

- Mall of Qatar

== See also ==
- Qatar Tourism Authority
- List of historical monuments in Qatar
