= Umm Al Maa =

Archaeological site in Qatar

- ام الماء (Arabic)
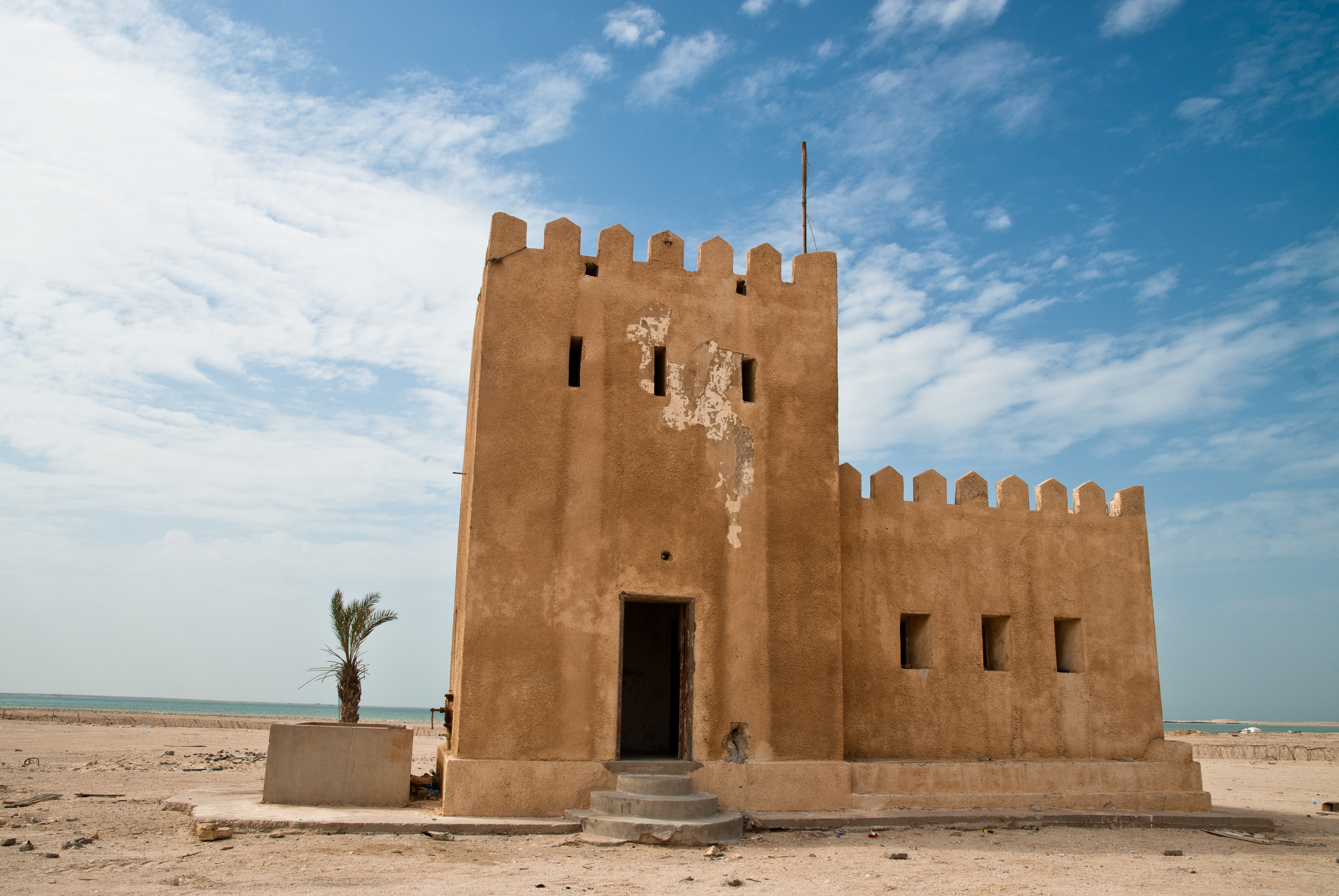
- Qala'at (Fort) Umm Al Maa

- Approximate location of Umm Al Maa archaeological site
- 25.817443°N 50.990465°E
- Type: Settlement
- Periods: Bronze Age (c. 3,000 BC)
- Cultures: Unknown, possibly Dilmun
- Location: Northwest Qatar

Site notes
- Area: At least 600 km^{2}
- Excavation dates: 1957; 1970s 1988–1991
- Archaeologists: Geoffrey Bibby & Peter Glob; Beatrice de Cardi; Masatoshi A Konishi, Takeshi Gotoh & Yoshihiko Akashi

Umm Al Maa (Arabic: ام الماء, romanized: ‘Umm al-Mā’) is an archaeological site in northwest Qatar in the municipality of Al Khor, near the border with Al Shamal. It has an ancient cemetery, which is thought to date to the Bronze Age.

== Etymology ==
The word umm is Arabic for "mother", and is a commonly used prefix used to signify geographic features. Maa, the second constituent, is the Arabic word "water"; it was given this name in reference to multiple freshwater wells found in the area.

== History ==
British diplomat and researcher J. G. Lorimer gives an account of Umm Al Maa in his Gazetteer of the Persian Gulf in 1908, presenting it as a bay known as Dōhat Umm Al Mā. He gives its location as 12 miles (19 km) below Ras Ushayriq and just above Dohat-Al-Usaiwad. He goes on to state:

"There are some good masonry wells inland and a ruined fort built by Ali-bin-Khalifah, late Shaikh of Bahrain, who used to spend part of the cold weather here."

During the 1937 Qatari–Bahraini conflict, the Al Jabor faction of Al Naim tribe were forced to evacuate here from Zubarah, where they were besieged by Sheikh Jassim bin Mohammed Al Thani's forces due to their allegiance to the emir of Bahrain.

During anthropological fieldwork conducted in 1950 by Henry Field, an estimated 30 tents belonging to the Bu Rumaih tribe were recorded in the area.

== Area description ==
Umm Al Maa is situated on the west coast of Qatar, around 80 km (50 mi) northwest of Doha and 55 km (34 mi) southwest of Madinat ash Shamal. It forms the southernmost extension of the middle sector of Qatar's interior plain region. For the most part, the area consists of level rocky plains and is accentuated with occasional low hillocks, depressions and furrows. Elevations of between 10 and 20 metres (33 and 66 ft) can be observed on its hillocks, which mainly comprise limestone but which are also composed of sedimentary depositions and sand. Depressions in the area show great variations in size and length, with some only measuring a few meters in diameter and the largest depression, named Mleiha, having a length of several hundred meters.

The area was long recognized for its abundance of potable water, as signified by its name. During rainy season, its multiple depressions would accommodate vast reservoirs of rainwater, which would supplement already-existing wells in the area, one of which is presently being used for a date palm plantation. Sabkhas (a type of salt-flat) prevail on its coastline. Not much vegetation is to be found, with the exception of desert shrubs, prickly bushes, and on rare occasions, Acacia trees.

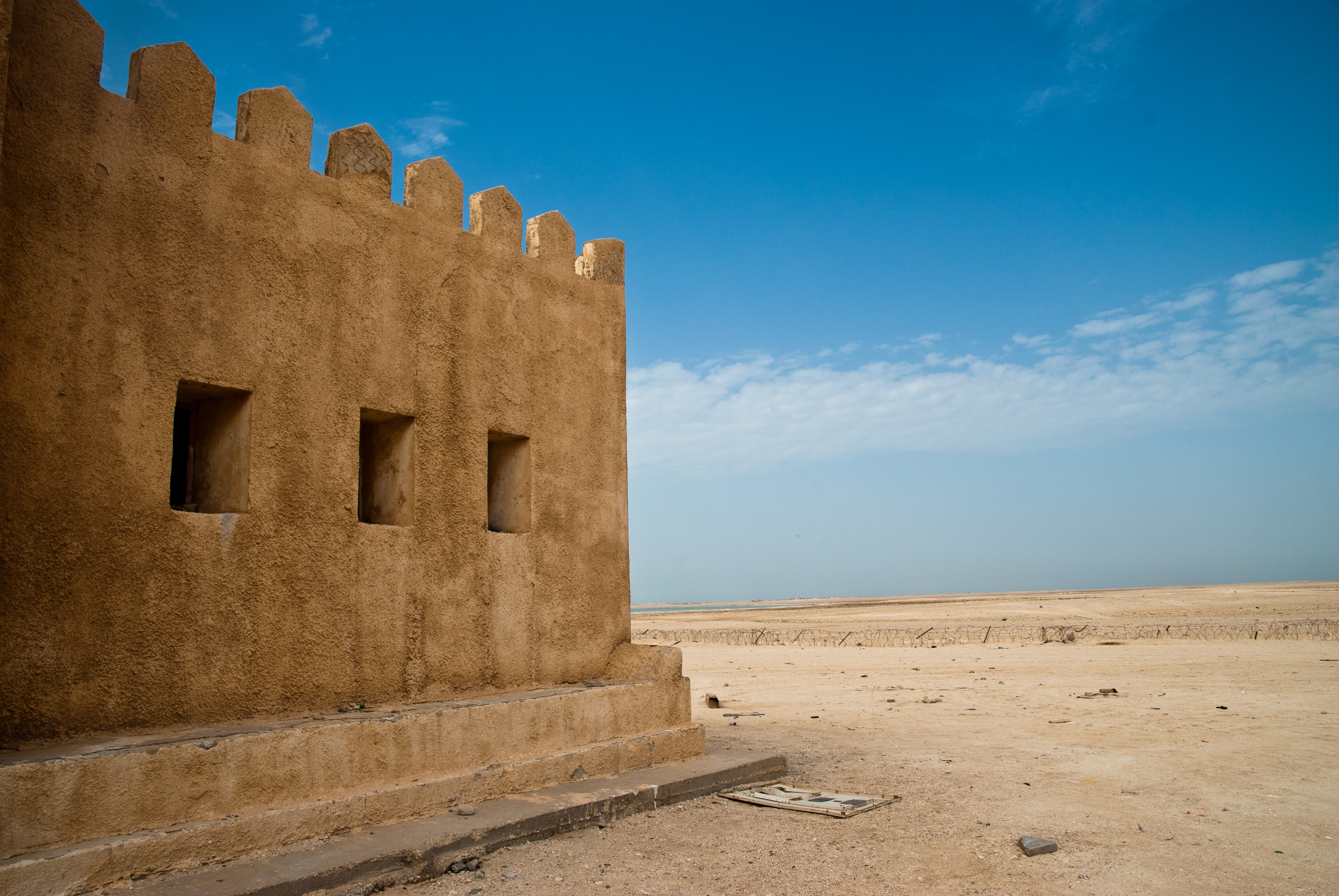
View of the flat, rocky desert behind Qala'at Umm Al Maa.

Most of the human activity seems to have been concentrated in the central Mleiha depression, which has an area of approximately 25 km^{2} (9.7 sq mi). However, the burial ground's boundaries are known to extend much further; at least from the coastline in the west to the highway between Al Jemailiya and Al Ghuwariyah in the east, and from as far north as the highway linking Zubarah and Al Ghuwariyah to the Dukhan Highway in the south. These boundaries would give it a minimum size of roughly 600 km^{2} (230 sq mi). Many of the burial mounds are grouped around low hillocks or in the depressions. The majority of these burial sites are in poor condition as a result of grave robbers, chemical and wind weathering, human traffic and recreational off-roading. These mounds are overlain mainly with limestone and on average have diameters of between 3 and 6 metres (9.8 and 19.7 ft) and stand from 10 centimetres (3.9 in) to 1 metre (3.3 ft) tall. Similar ancient cemeteries have been observed at Ar Rakiyat to the north and at a smaller scale near the city of Al Khor on the eastern coast. Although the first official estimate of tombs was put at roughly 50 by the Danes in late 1950s, a German archaeological team that conducted a preliminary survey of the site in 2008 claimed there were at least a few hundred, if not thousands of mounds.

== Settlement ==
British archaeologist Beatrice de Cardi and her team were the first to study the settlement at Umm Al Maa in any great detail. Among their discoveries were Indian red polished ware and glazed earthenware, which they dated to the Sasanian period (c. third century AD to seventh century AD).

The German archaeological team which carried out a preliminary survey of the area in 2008 noted that it had not found conclusive evidence of a settlement. Remnants of various stone structures were observed, but the majority were associated fire pits, prayer areas, barns and tent corrals, all of which would point towards more recent origins. The most convincing evidence of prior settlement was uncovered in the Mleiha depression near the only water well still in use, where outcroppings of old structures can be seen. However, an earthenware fragment found by the team near the well was said to be no older than 200 to 300 years, thus this area may also be associated with more recent habitation. The team theorized that the ancient cairns were likely constructed by nomads rather than settled peoples, as the climate and geography of the area discouraged a sedentary lifestyle.

== Graveyard ==
=== Discovery ===
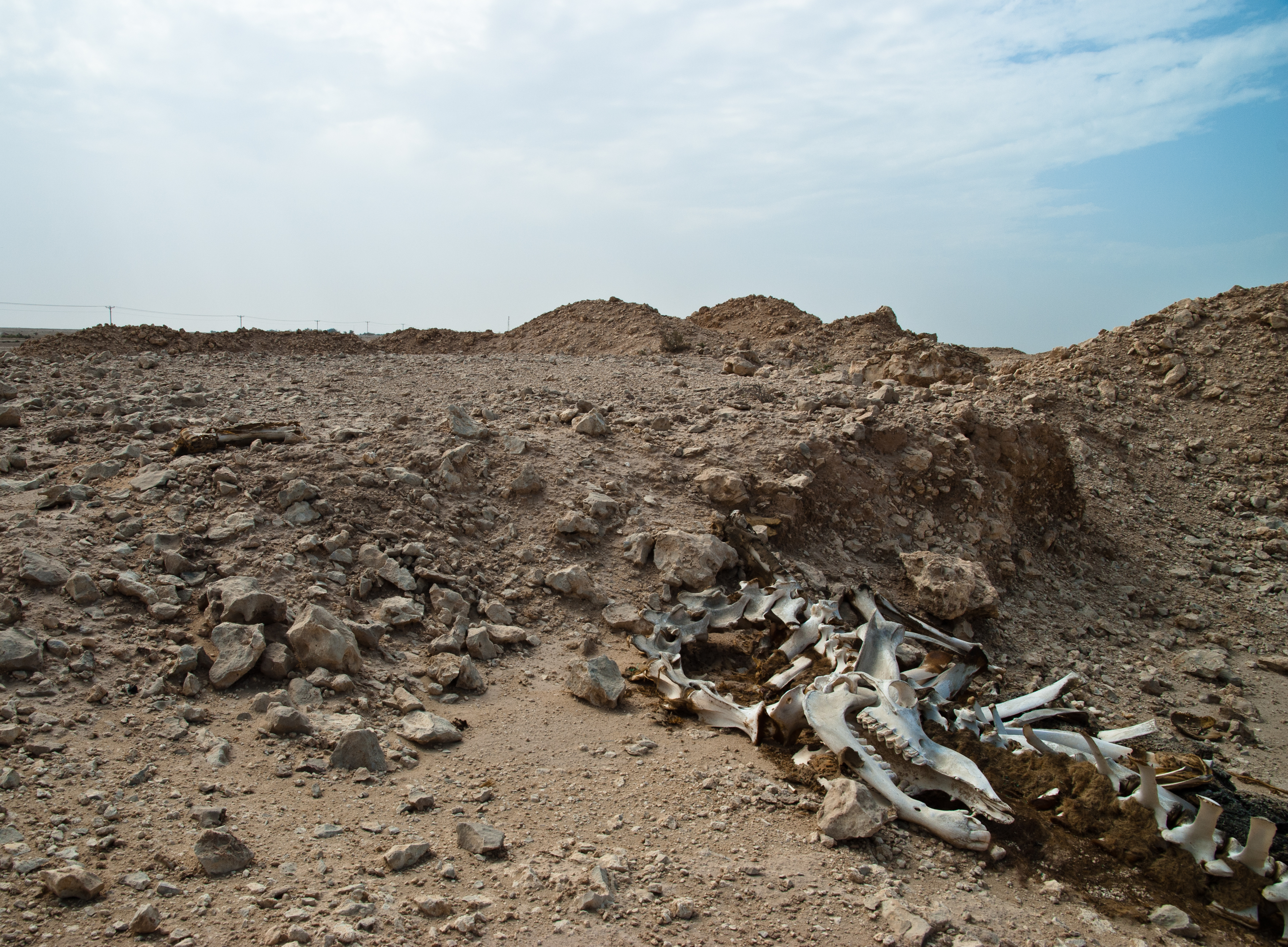
A view of some of the mounds at Umm Al Maa.

In 1957, an ancient graveyard containing 50 cairns was found here by a Danish archaeological duo consisting of Geoffrey Bibby and Peter Glob. The average cairn had a 10 m (33 ft) diameter and stood around 1 m (3.3 ft). One of the cairns uncovered by the Danes in 1957, which had a diameter of 6 m (20 ft), a height of 0.6 m (2.0 ft) and a length of 1.9 m (6.2 ft), was of particular interest. Further investigation uncovered that it had a stone cist with three roof slabs (flat rocks used to cover a grave) encompassed by smaller rocks. The cist was facing north-to-south and was fitted into the bedrock. Within the cist was a skeleton facing towards the north. As no grave products were found alongside the skeleton, the Danes were unable to date it. However, they were able to date pit fired earthenware and sherds of an alabaster bowl found in the cairns. They postulated that the cairns and pottery most likely dated to the Bronze Age (c. 3000 BC), which they concluded by comparison of similar Bronze Aged cairns found in Bahrain.

=== Japanese Archaeological Mission ===
==== First season ====
A Japanese archaeological mission composed of Masatoshi A Konishi, Takeshi Gotoh and Yoshihiko Akashi picked up where the Danes left off. They surveyed Qatar from 1988 to 1991. They released their first report on the cairns in 1989. In their second report, they referred to these sites as 'burial mounds' rather than cairns. A burial mound dubbed J-2 by the team was found in an oval arrangement measuring 3.4 by 2.5 metres (11.2 by 8.2 ft). Upon removing the roof slabs, a cist was uncovered. It was roughly 1.7 metres (5.6 ft) long and 0.3 metres (0.98 ft) wide. It comprised five or six substantial stone sections placed around the walls of a rectangular pit excavated into the bedrock. Inside the cist, a skeleton was found whose heading was roughly NNW-SSE. As the skeleton was delicate, fallen slabs had fractured its head into several pieces. The skeleton belonged to a woman who was likely in late adulthood. No grave artifacts were found alongside the skeleton.

==== Second season ====
During the second season, 1990–91, the Japanese group unearthed two burial complexes labelled J-3 and J-4, which featured a series of oval burial mounds measuring between 4 and 8 metres (13 and 26 ft) in diameter. The mounds were heaped on a thin, level layer of dark-colored sand with a depth of 4 to 8 centimetres (1.6 to 3.1 in). The mounds themselves were made mainly of light-colored sand and were slightly slanted. After the mounds were dug up, oval arrangements of intently piled stones with recessed centers were uncovered. The disturbance of some of the mounds by grave robbers was readily apparent. Both complexes contained burial chambers covered by roof slabs and heaps of pebbles. Within one of the chambers, a skeleton was discovered, but it had decayed beyond the point of recognition, and no further information could be discerned. Artifacts recovered from the chamber include a little circular bead made of dark transparent flint glass and fragments of a bronze or copper bowl.

More artifacts were discovered in the other chamber, including a cylindrical-shaped agate bead, two circular flint glass beads, pieces of bronze and copper rings, and an intact bronze and copper ring. Further items were found beneath the mound, including a stone mortar and fragments of pottery.

There was little consistency in the planning of these burial chambers and the accommodations for their inhabitants. For instance, some were built to accommodate bodies in a contracted position, while others seemed to have been built to house more than one corpse.

The Japanese team noted the similarity of the pottery and other finds to those of a Seleucid site on Failaka Island and posited a date of sometime between the first century BC and the first century AD. Archaeologist Muhammad Abdul Nayeem has stated that these burials were reminiscent of graves purportedly built by nomads in Dhahran, Saudi Arabia around the third millennium BC.
