= Umm Al Daah Khawzan =

Umm Al Daah Khawzan أم الداه خوزان
- Village
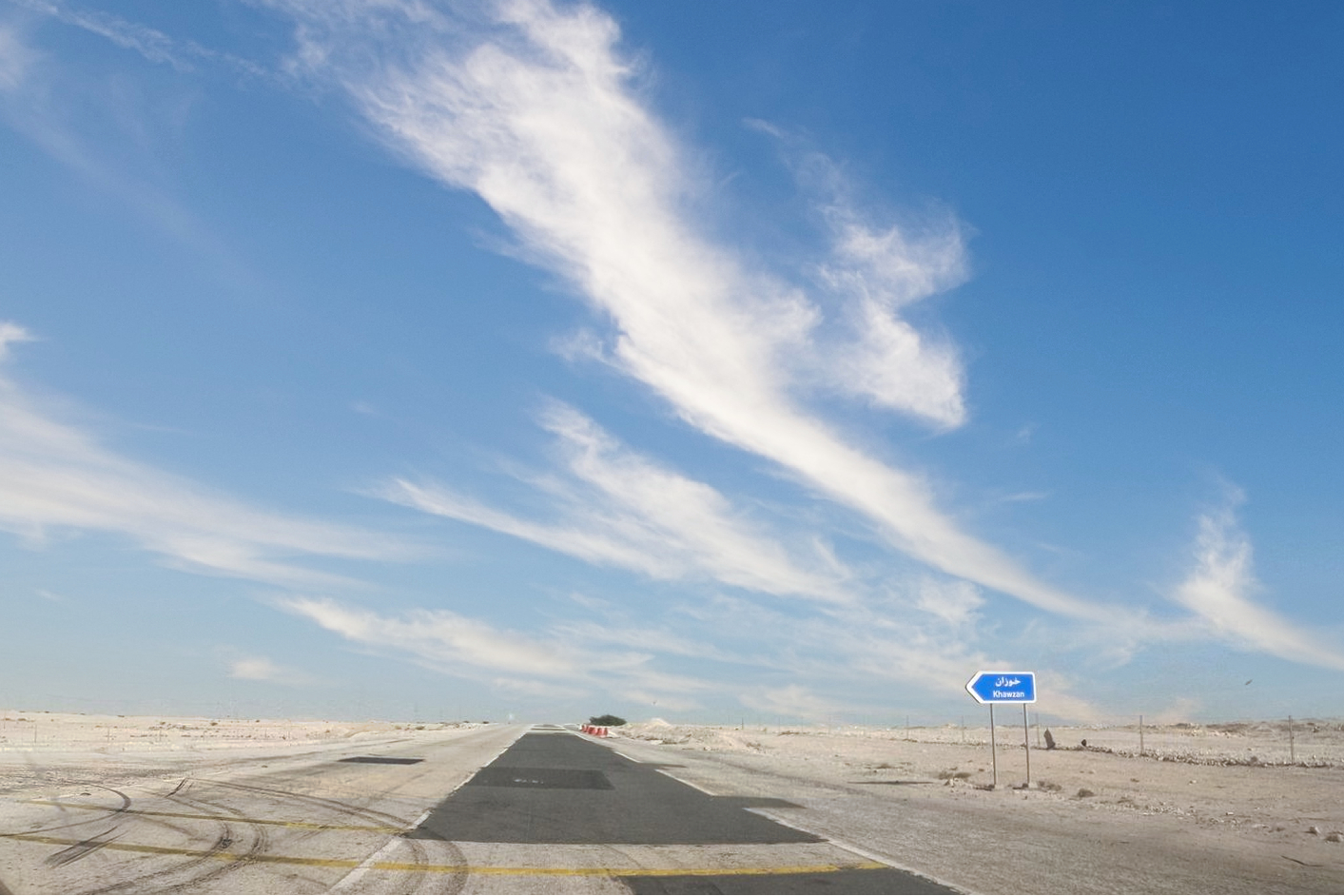
- Sign for Khawzan on Khawzan Road

- Location in Qatar
- Coordinates: 25°28′43″N 50°56′22″E
- Country: Qatar
- Municipality: Al-Shahaniya
- Zone: Zone 72
- District no.: 387

Area
  - Total: 4.9 sq mi (12.6 km^{2})

Umm Al Daah Khawzan (Arabic: أم الداه خوزان; also known simply as Khawzan) is a village in Qatar located in the municipality of Al-Shahaniya. It is accessible through Dukhan Road. The closest city is the industrial hub of Dukhan. According to the Ministry of Environment, there were about six households in the village in 2014.

== Etymology ==
The village's name consists of three elements. The first, umm, is Arabic for "mother" and is a common prefix in Qatar when attached to a geographical descriptor. Daah is the local name for a shrub (Lasiurus hirsutus) that grows abundantly in the area. Widespread throughout southern Qatar, the plant is slightly yellow in color and is consumed by grazing livestock.

Finally, the village derives the name Khawzan from a local depression known as Rawdat Khawzan. In Arabic, khazan roughly means "reservoir". The depression historically served as an important water source for nearby settlements, retaining water for several months after the rainy season.

== Geography ==
Umm Al Daah Khawzan is close to Ras Abrouq on the Zekreet Peninsula, which hosts the majority of Qatar's ostriches and is part of the Al Reem Biosphere Reserve. Ostriches have occasionally wandered into the village and harassed its residents.
