= Zone 72, Qatar =

Zone 72
- Zone
- Interactive map of Zone 72
- Coordinates: 25.497217°N 51.042504°E
- Country: Qatar
- Municipality: Al-Shahaniya
- Blocks: 58

Area
  - Total: 662.2 km^{2} (255.7 sq mi)

Population (2015)
  - Total: 1,232
  - Density: 1.860/km^{2} (4.819/sq mi)
- Time zone: UTC+03 (Arabia Standard Time)
- ISO 3166 code: QA-SH

Zone 72 is a zone in the municipality of Al-Shahaniya in the state of Qatar. The main district recorded in the 2015 population census was Al Utouriya.

Other districts which fall within its administrative boundaries are Lehsain, Qaryat Al Refaiq, Ras Abrouq, Umm Al Daah Khawzan, Umm Al Qahab Al Jadeeda, Umm Al Qahab Al Qadeema, Umm Leghab West, Wadi Laswaq, and Zekreet.

== Demographics ==
As of the 2010 census, the zone comprised 363 housing units and 123 establishments. There were 1,060 people living in the zone, of whom 72% were male and 28% were female. Out of the 1,060 inhabitants, 80% were 20 years of age or older, and 20% were under the age of 20.

Employed people made up 72% of the total population. Females accounted for 19% of the working population, while males accounted for 81% of the working population. Most of the working population is employed within the agricultural industry (356), and public administration and defense comes in second with 110 employed individuals.

Year	Population
1986	761
1997	915
2004	939
2010	1,060
2015	1,232

== Land use ==
The Ministry of Municipality and Environment (MME) breaks down land use in the zone as follows.

Area (km^{2})	Developed land (km^{2})	Undeveloped land (km^{2})	Residential (km^{2})	Commercial/ Industrial (km^{2})	Education/ Health (km^{2})	Farming/ Green areas (km^{2})	Other uses (km^{2})
662.17	15.92	646.25	0.11	0.00	0.00	10.45	5.36
