= Lehsain =

Lehsain لحصين
- Abandoned village
- Location in Qatar
- Coordinates: 25.53943°N 50.93837°E
- Country: Qatar
- Municipality: Al-Shahaniya
- Zone: Zone 72
- District no.: 193

Area
  - Total: 6.4 sq mi (16.5 km^{2})

Lehsain (Arabic: لحصين; also spelled Al-Hussayn and Al Husain) is an abandoned village in Qatar located in the municipality of Al-Shahaniya. The area is characterized by an abundance of gravel, dense clusters of trees, and wild herbs. Lehsayn encompasses the architectural ruins of a village and a fort (Qasr Lehsain), a mud depression, and remnants of wells and seasonal agricultural activities. The term "Al-Husayn" is a diminutive form of the word for "fort" in Arabic.

Lehsain is located approximately 65 kilometres (40 mi) from the capital Doha. It is roughly 3 kilometres (1.9 mi) from the coastal entry to the area referred to as Doha Al-Hussein and approximately 10 kilometres (6.2 mi) southwest of the village of Zekreet.

== History ==
In J.G. Lorimer's Gazetteer of the Persian Gulf written in the early 1900s, he makes mention of Dōhat-Al-Hasain, noting its location as "halfway down the west side of Qatar", and describes it as a large bay that runs inland in a southerly direction. He goes on to state:

"The foot of it is called Dōhat Faishshākh. It contains Jazīrat Abū Falītah, and Rās Aburūk forms the western side of its entrance. Rās-as-Sumaiyah projects into it from its eastern side. On the west side of the bay are the ruins of a fort which was built by Rahmah-bin-Jabir early in the 19th century. There are 4 or 5 masonry wells of brackish water near the site of the fort."

== Archaeology ==
Numerous Neolithic settlements have been uncovered on Qatar's west coast in the Zekreet Peninsula and Dukhan region. During the British archaeological expedition of Qatar in 1973–74 led by Beatrice de Cardi, Neolithic-era stone cutters were found in Lehsain. They closely resemble other tools belonging to the Mousterian industry, but archaeologist G. H. Smith of the British expedition suggested that this industry could be unique to Qatar.

== Qasr Lehsain ==
During the archaeological explorations conducted by the British Archaeological Mission in Qatar from late 1973 to early 1974, the team carried out a survey of the Al-Husain site. This survey uncovered remnants of a building, identified as a castle, revealing only a few collapsed walls, an entrance along the southern wall, and a semi-circular tower at the northeastern corner. The discovery of broken pottery fragments during this survey suggested that the castle was constructed in the 19th century AD.

In 2011, a subsequent British team conducted another surface examination of the site and the castle, determining that Al-Husain Castle (or Qasr Al-Husain) is situated in the eastern part of a valley. The structure is square, measuring 40 by 40 meters, and features two watchtowers positioned at the northeastern and southwestern corners. The northwestern tower was found to be circular, consistent with other towers in castles from the same period. The remains of the castle walls are composed of piles of longitudinal stone rubble, particularly evident in the central courtyard, which lacks any structural remains. Excavations in the eastern section of the castle revealed the thickest of the castle walls, a wall with a thickness of 44.1 meters and a height of less than one meter. The survey results indicated that the castle's building units were constructed directly on the ground surface without foundational digging.

== Settlement ==
Two distinct groups of building blocks are scattered around the site of Qasr Lehsain. The first group comprises three rectangular buildings outside the southern castle wall, with two positioned along the eastern and western sides and the third along the northern and southern sides. The second group, located on the western side of the valley, consists of seven rectangular buildings similar in pattern to the first group but with differing room sizes. It is believed that these structures, like the castle, date back to the 19th century.

Additionally, several mosques were found on both sides of the valley, two different cemeteries affiliated with the castle were unearthed, and several wells are found on the southern side. Farms and trees surround these wells.
