= Jebel Jassassiyeh =

Archaeological site in Qatar

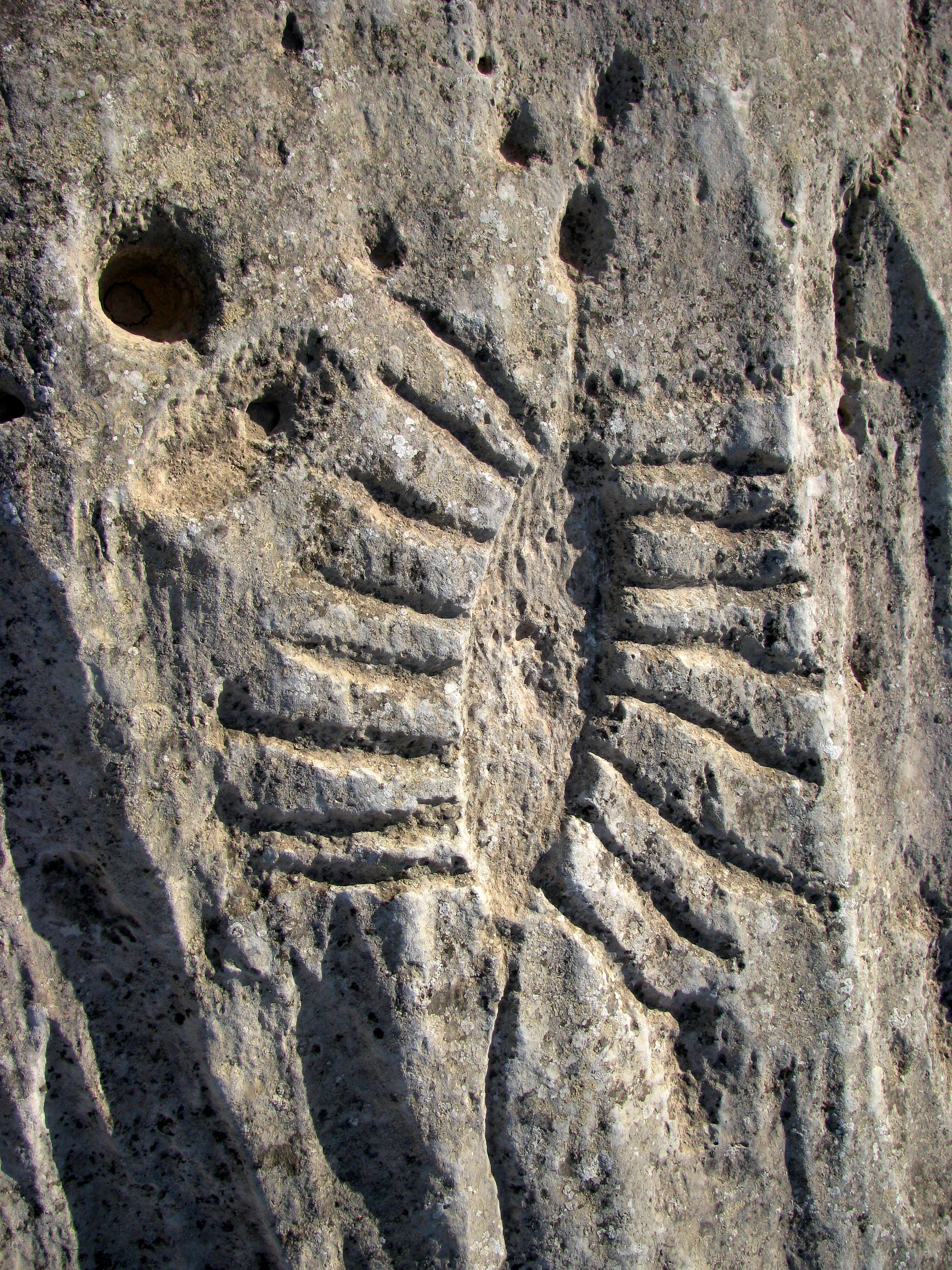
Plan drawings of a boat with oars

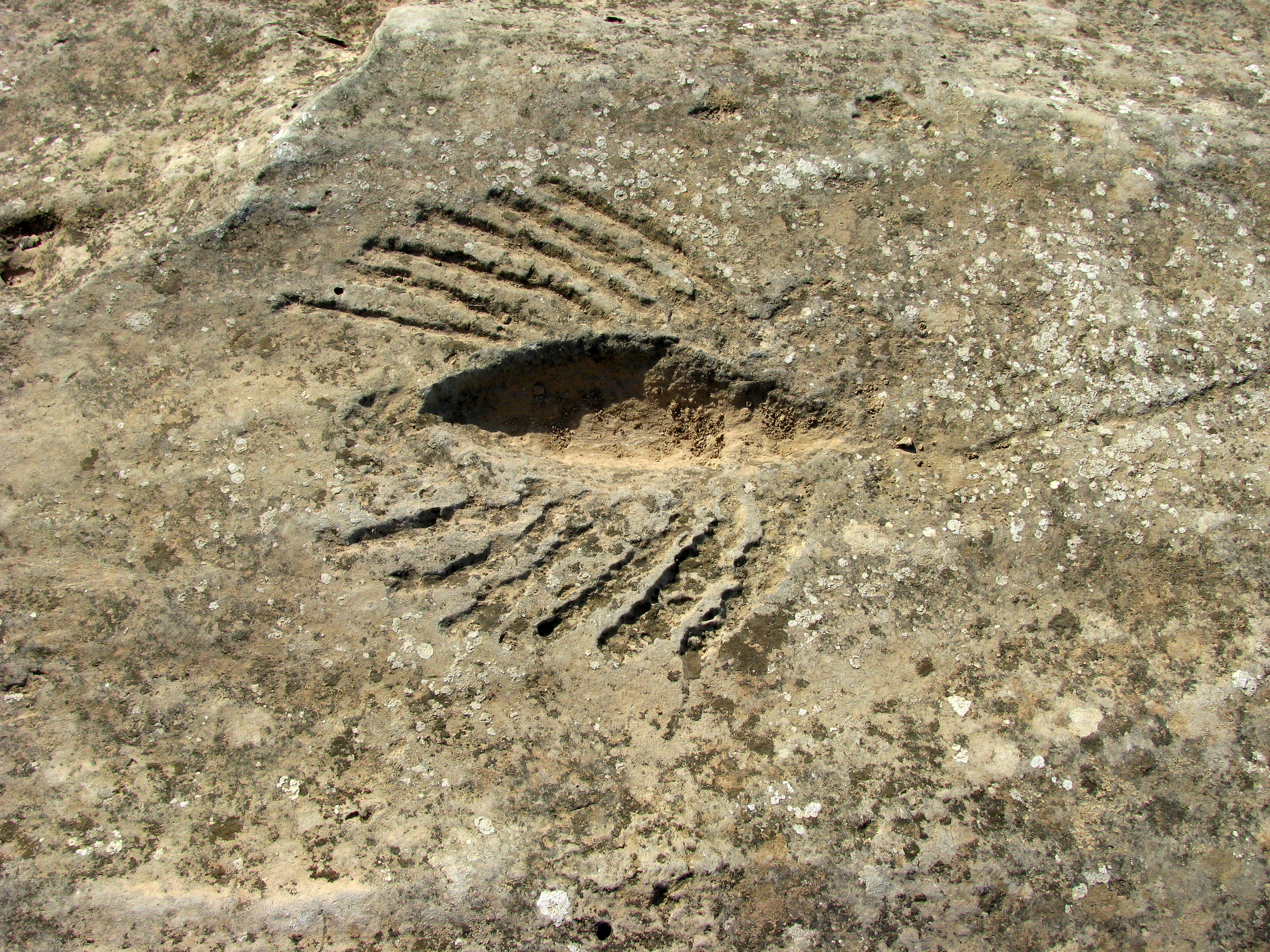
Plan drawings of a boat with oars

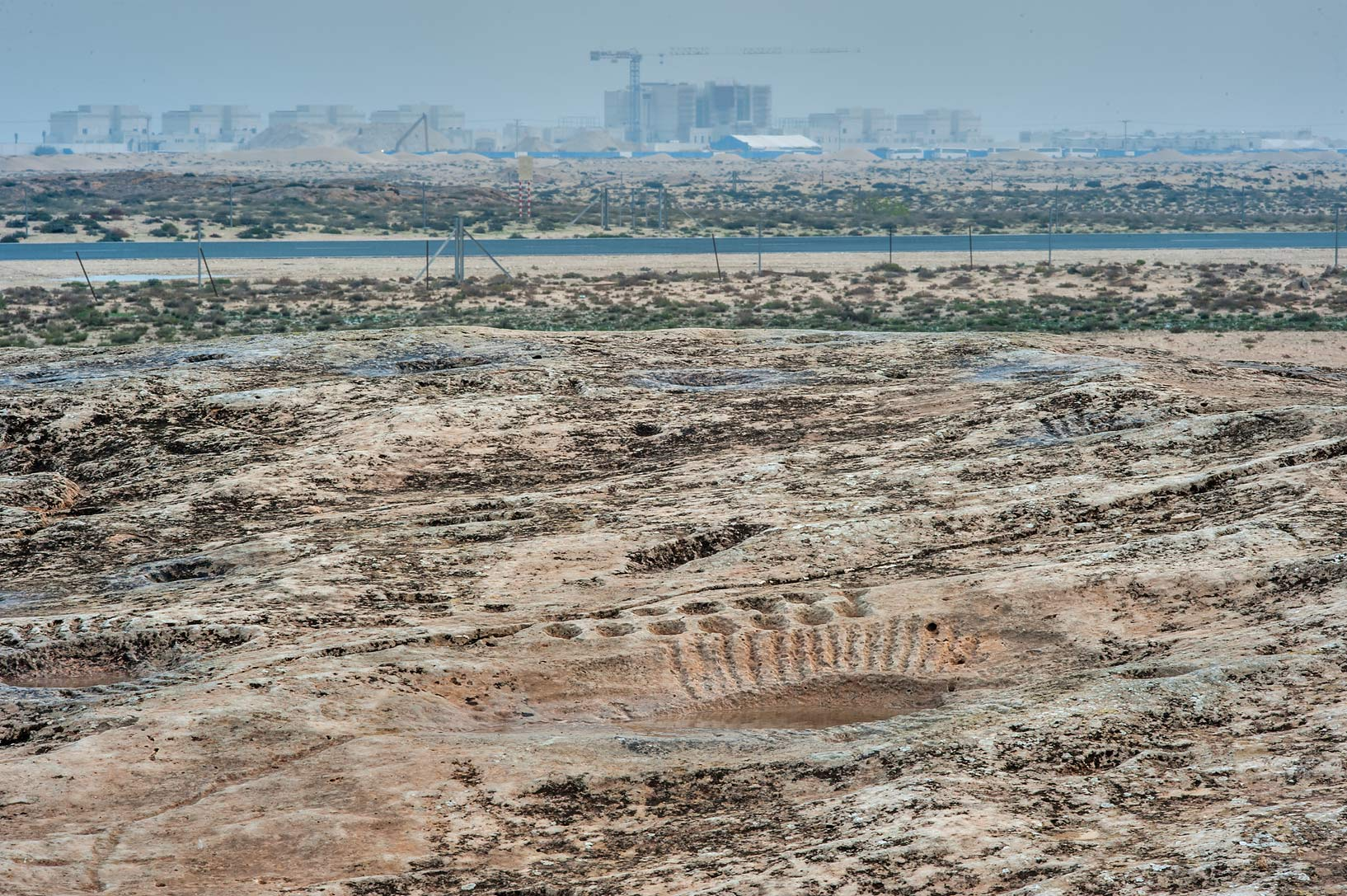
View to the east from Jebel Jassassiyeh

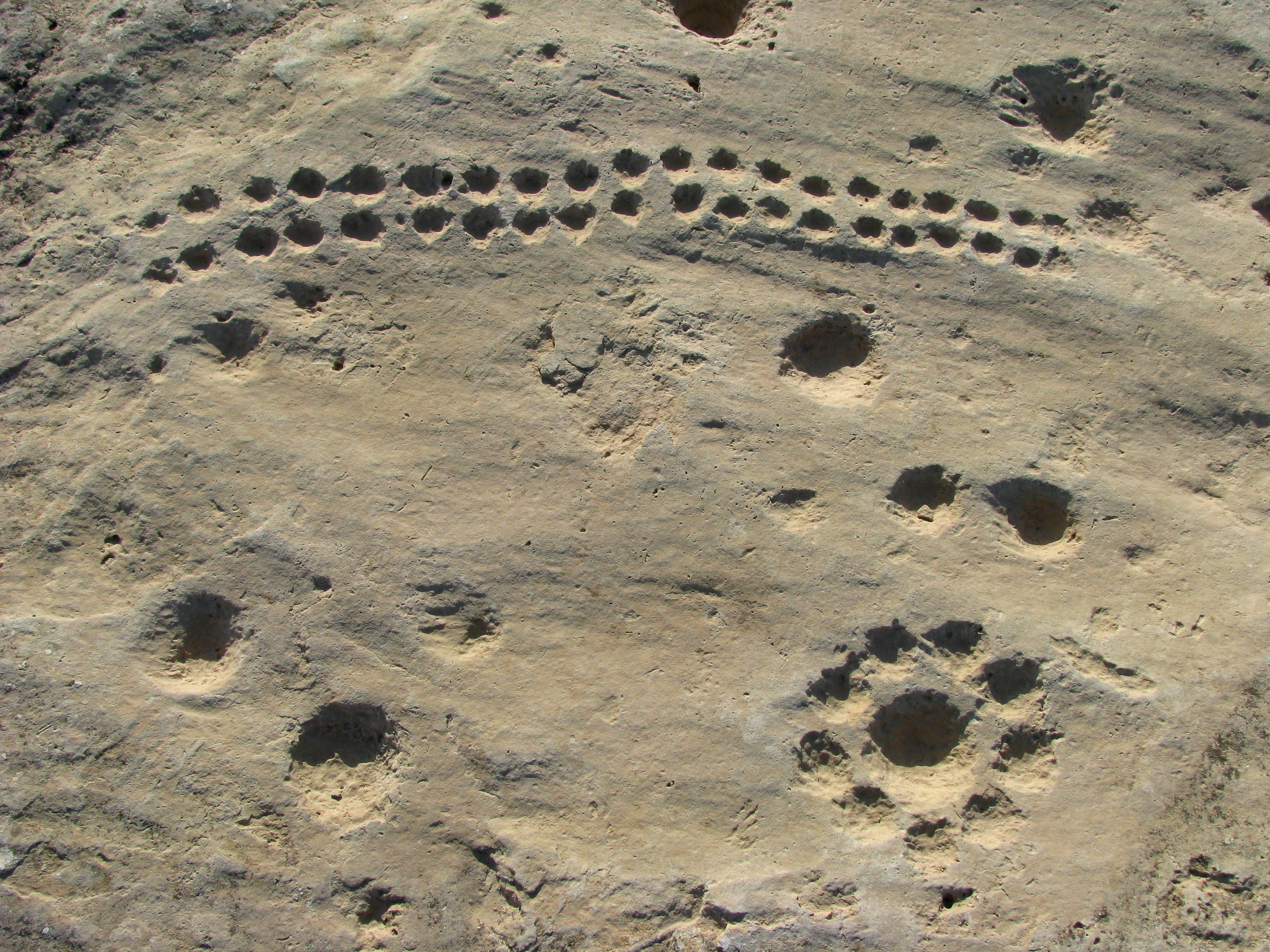
Dot carvings

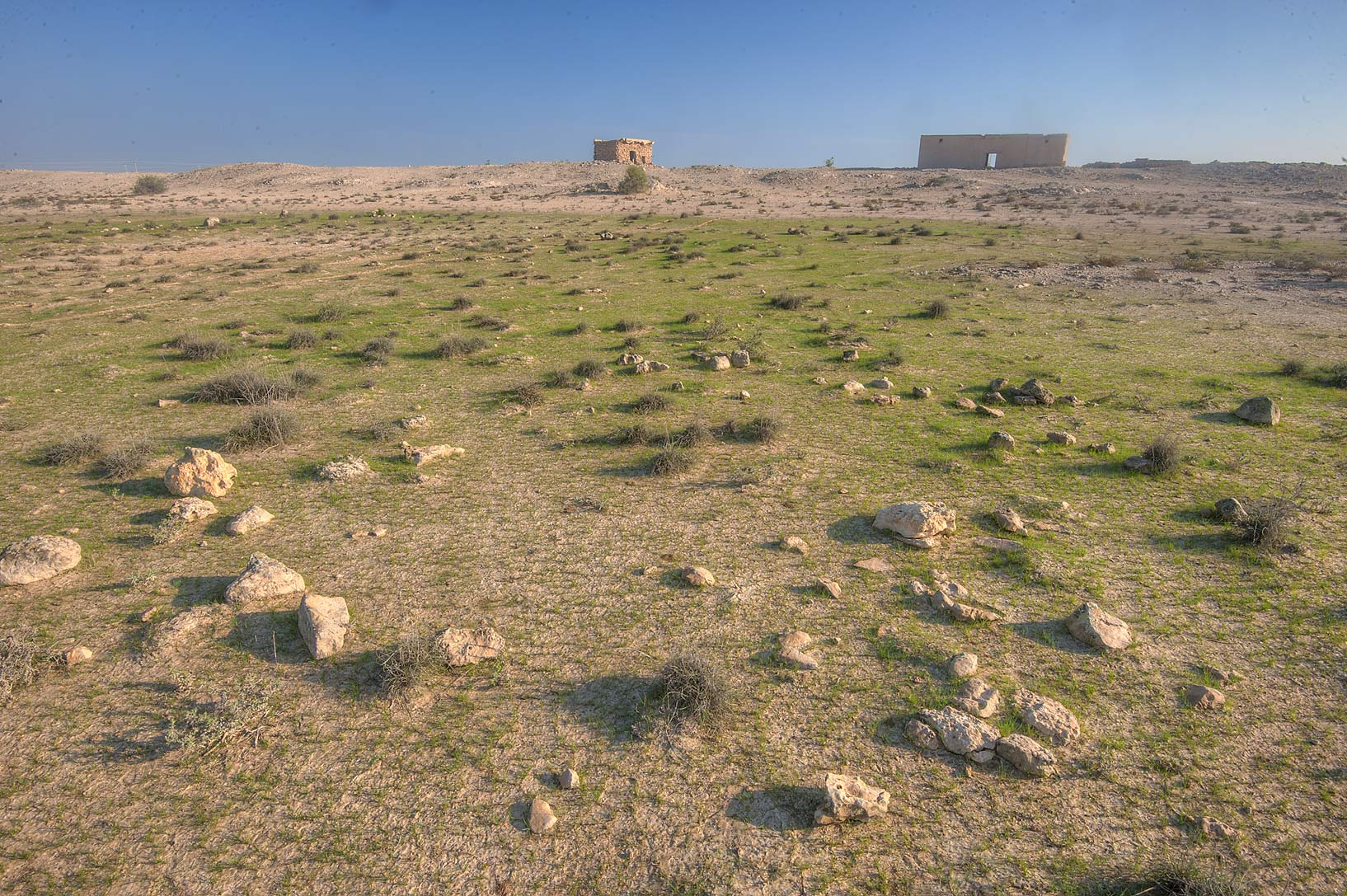
Green area behind Jebel Jassassiyeh

Jebel Jassassiyeh (Arabic: جبل الجساسية, romanized: Jabal al Jasāsīyah) is an area with early petroglyphs, residential ruins and pottery remnants (from the 15th century) in northeast Qatar. The carvings, in fossil sand dunes ("jebels"), include geometric shapes, animals and ship shapes. It is Qatar's most extensive rock art site with more than 900 carvings scattered over 580 numbered sites. They are similar to those found at the temple of Karnak in Luxor, Egypt. The area also has ruined dwellings and remains of pottery from the 15th century.

A large percentage of its coastal area is dotted with rocky hills, as hinted by its name. It is promoted as an important tourist attraction by the Qatar Tourism Authority.

== Etymology ==
In Arabic, jebel translates to "hill". The second constituent is derived from the Arabic word jassa, which means "to search". It received its name because its high elevation allows bystanders to spot oncoming ships.

== Area overview ==
Jebel Jassassiyeh is in the northeast section of Qatar, around 4.8 km (3 mi) south of Fuwayrit. Nearby settlements include Safiyaa Fuwairit, Al Marrawnah, and Al Huwailah. It consists of many prominent limestone sand dunes situated near the coastline. On average, the sand dunes are no more than 7 m (23 ft) tall with a central ridge approximately 600 m (2,000 ft) in length, making the assemblage of sand dunes one of the largest in the northeast peninsula.

== Carvings ==
The carvings were first discovered by a Danish archaeological team led by Holger Kapel in 1961. Holger's son, Hans Kapel, surveyed and recorded the carvings in the 1974. He concluded that there were approximately 900 carvings of various types.

Cup and ring marks are the most common forms of art among the carvings. Different animals are also depicted, including ostriches, turtles and fish. Jebel Jassassiyeh is the only rock art site in Qatar where boat depictions have been recorded.

=== Boat carvings ===
Two main categories, based on carving method and rendition, are used to classify the boat carvings. The first category, which accounts for 124 of the carvings, are drawn in plan. The second category accounts for only 17 of the boat carvings and consists of elevation drawings. Plan drawings are mainly found along the central ridge, whereas the elevation drawings are primarily found on the outcrops closer to the sea.

The boats are of different sizes and types, and some contain oars while others do not. Two main types of dhows are included in elevation drawings: battils and baqarahs. British archaeologist William Facey has inferred that some of the elevation drawings are meant to represent pearling crafts due to the prominence of the boats' oars. Because the battils and baqarahs contained rudders, he concludes that the elevation drawings could not have been carved earlier than 1000–1200 AD.

In later carvings, the boats appeared with sails. In some of the rock carvings, sails appear without boats. Some of the ancient carvings were modified at later periods, with devices such as ropes and anchors being added.

The earliest date of origin for the carvings is inconclusive. Archaeologist Muhammad Abdul Nayeem (1998) tentatively dated the earliest of the carvings to the third century BC, whereas William Facey (1987) dated the earliest plan and elevation drawings to the eleventh century AD. A study conducted in 2012 which tested nine samples of carvings, including boat carvings, concluded that the oldest of the samples had a minimum age of less than 300 years. The study found no evidence to support the view of the carvings dating back millenniums.

== Settlement ==
Jebel Jassassiyeh is thought to have been inhabited prior to the 18th century. The area's close proximity to the sea would have allowed for easy access for boats. The area contains clean groundwater which is close to the surface and there are several wells in the vicinity. Beatrice De Cardi's archaeological team reported in 1974 the presence of two habitation mounds and several potsherds dating to various periods, with the earliest recorded potsherds dating to the 10th or 11th century AD. William Facey notes Jebel Jassassiyeh's close proximity (6.4 km (4 mi)) of Jebel Jassassiyeh to Al Huwaila, Qatar's largest town before the ascendance of Zubarah in the 18th century. He has speculated that the area could have functioned as a lookout post and restocking station for incoming pearling boats.

== Bibliography ==
- Abdul Nayeem, Muhammad (1998). Qatar Prehistory and Protohistory from the Most Ancient Times (Ca. 1,000,000 to End of B.C. Era). Hyderabad Publishers. ISBN 978-81-85492-04-9.
