= Al Huwaila =

Al Huwaila اَلْحُوَيْلَة
- Abandoned town
- Location in Qatar
- Coordinates: 25°56′00″N 51°27′00″E
- Country: Qatar
- Municipality: Al Shamal
- Zone: Zone 77
- District no.: 326

Area
  - Total: 3.0 sq mi (7.7 km^{2})

Al Huwaila (Arabic: اَلْحُوَيْلَة, romanized: Al Ḩuwaylah; also spelled Lehwaila) is an abandoned town in Qatar in the municipality of Al Shamal. Prior to the 18th century, and as perhaps as early as the 16th century, it served as Qatar's main town before its population migrated elsewhere.

Nearby areas include Jebel Jassassiyeh to the immediate west and Ras Laffan to the east.

== Etymology ==
The town's name comes from the Arabic word tahawala, which is translated as "to divert". This name is due to the area's low elevation which allowed it to divert the flow of water from a nearby valley.

== History ==
=== Early history ===
Ottoman records make the earliest known mention of Al Huwaila in 1555. The records state that, at that time, the Qatar Peninsula was ruled by Mohammed bin Sultan bani Muslim of the Al Musallam tribe and that he had his seat of power in Al Huwaila.

Carsten Niebuhr made a map of Qatar in 1765, depicting the settlement for the first time as Huali.

Shortly after the founding of Zubarah in the 1760s by the Bani Utbah, the Al Musallam of Al Huwaila held nominal authority over that settlement and other northern settlements by taxing their residents. However, they were challenged by the Al Khalifa, who constructed Qal'at Murair in 1768 and began refusing to pay taxes. Following several successive skirmishes, the Al Khalifa launched a successful assault on Al Huwaila, leading to the flight of the Al Musallam leadership to Najd.

=== Battle of Al Huwaila ===
In the early 19th century, the settlement was the site of an internal conflict within the ruling Al Khalifa family of Bahrain. The incident, later known as the Battle of Al Huwaila, arose when three sons of Sheikh Abdullah bin Ahmad Al Khalifa (Muhammad, Ahmed, and Ali) broke from their father and took up residence in Al Huwaila. Their mother belonged to the powerful Al Bin Ali tribe, a prominent group in the region with considerable influence and resources.

With the support of their maternal relatives, the three sons sought to challenge their father's authority and assert political autonomy. Sheikh Abdullah attempted to resolve the matter peacefully, warning his sons of the dangers of rebellion; however, his appeals were rejected. In response, Sheikh Abdullah instructed his nephew, Muhammad bin Khalifa bin Salman, to organize a military expedition against the dissident faction. Around 1820, Muhammad led a naval force from Bahrain and launched an attack on Al Huwaila. Following intense fighting, Sheikh Abdullah's sons were defeated and surrendered. They later sought their father's forgiveness, which was granted, and they returned to Bahrain. The incident forced Sheikh Abdullah to abandon a planned campaign toward Qatif and contributed to the loss of strategic territories such as Saihat.

=== Later 19th century ===
In the 1820s, George Barnes Brucks carried out the first British survey of the Persian Gulf. He recorded the following notes about Al Huwaila, which he referred to as Al Owhale:

Al Owhale is a town in lat. 25° 56' 45" N., long. 51° 30' 30" E. It is defended by a small square Ghuree, and is the principal place on the coast. It is subject to Bahrein. It is inhabited by about four hundred and fifty of the Abookara [Al Kuwari] Tribe, formerly one of the most powerful in these parts, but now incorporated with the Uttoobees. It has a few boats belonging to it, contains water, and has some supplies of cattle. The people are mostly employed as fishermen, or in the coasting trade. This is one of the principal stations during the pearl fishery season.

A survey conducted by the British Hydrographic Office in 1890 reflects on Al Huwaila's drastic decline during the mid-19th century, describing the town as such:

Al Howeila is a small town and fort 6 miles W.N.W. of Ras Laffan. The coast makes a small bay here, in which the reef extends 1 1/2 miles off shore. It has a square fort visible 8 miles. The people are employed in the pearl fishery. In 1887 the place was found to be deserted. The north point of the little bay is called 'Ras al Marlina, close to the southward of which the pearl boats find shelter during a shamal.

=== 20th century ===
John Gordon Lorimer mentions Al Huwaila in his 1908 manuscript of the Gazetteer of the Persian Gulf, stating:

In English at one time known as "Owhale". A deserted town on the east coast of Qatar about midway between Dhakhirah and the extremity of the peninsula. There are numerous wells in the vicinity, 2 miles inland from the sea, but the water is of indifferent quality. Before Zubarah and Dohah rose to importance, Huwailah was the chief town of Qatar. It is believed that the inhabitants were originally Al Musallam, who were expelled by the Shaikhs of Bahrein, and that thereafter they were Al Bin 'Ali up to about 1850.

== Gallery ==
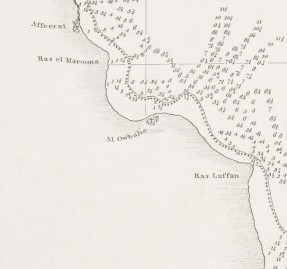
Al Huwaila (Al Owhale) in G.B. Bruck's 1824 map

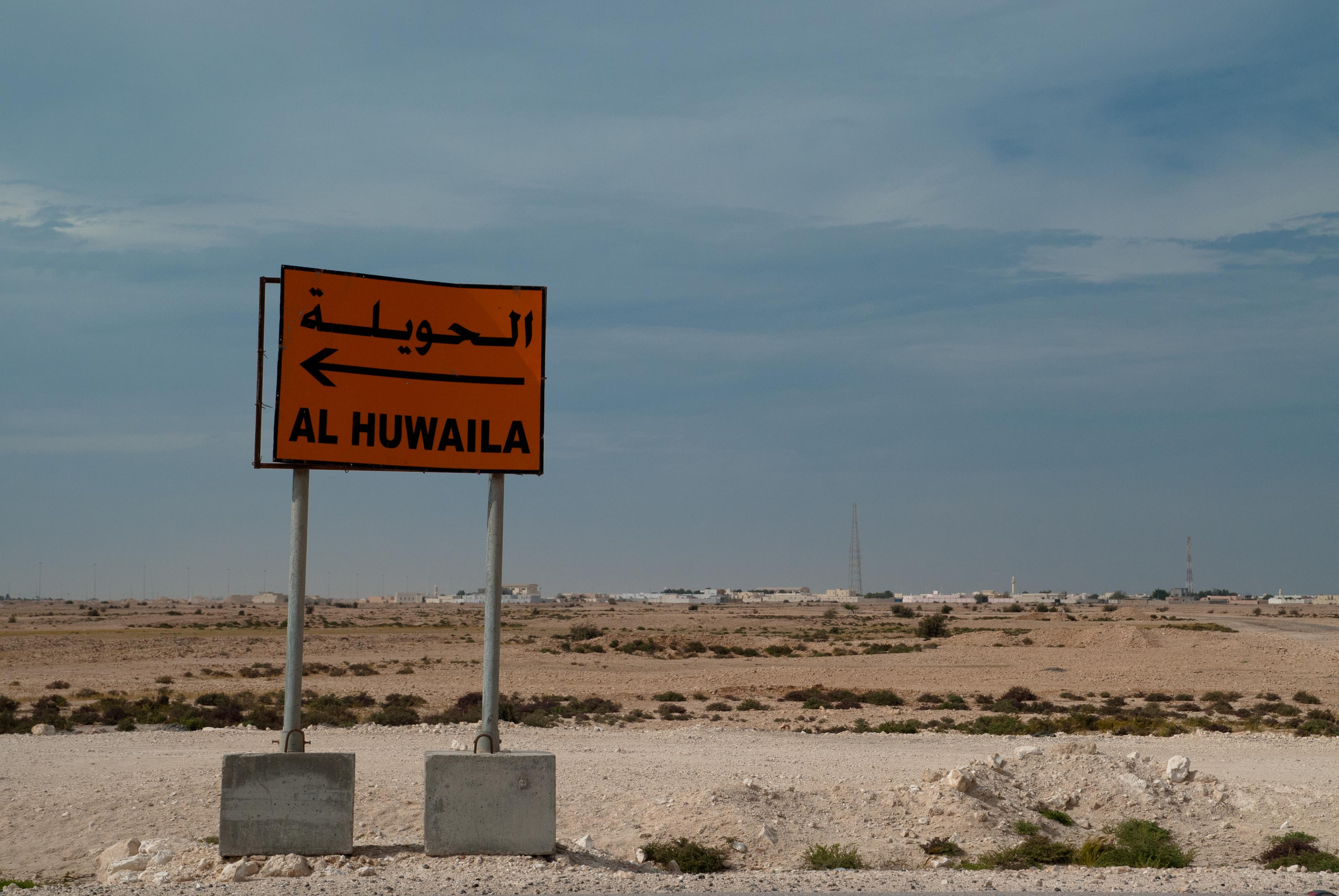
A road sign for Al Huwaila

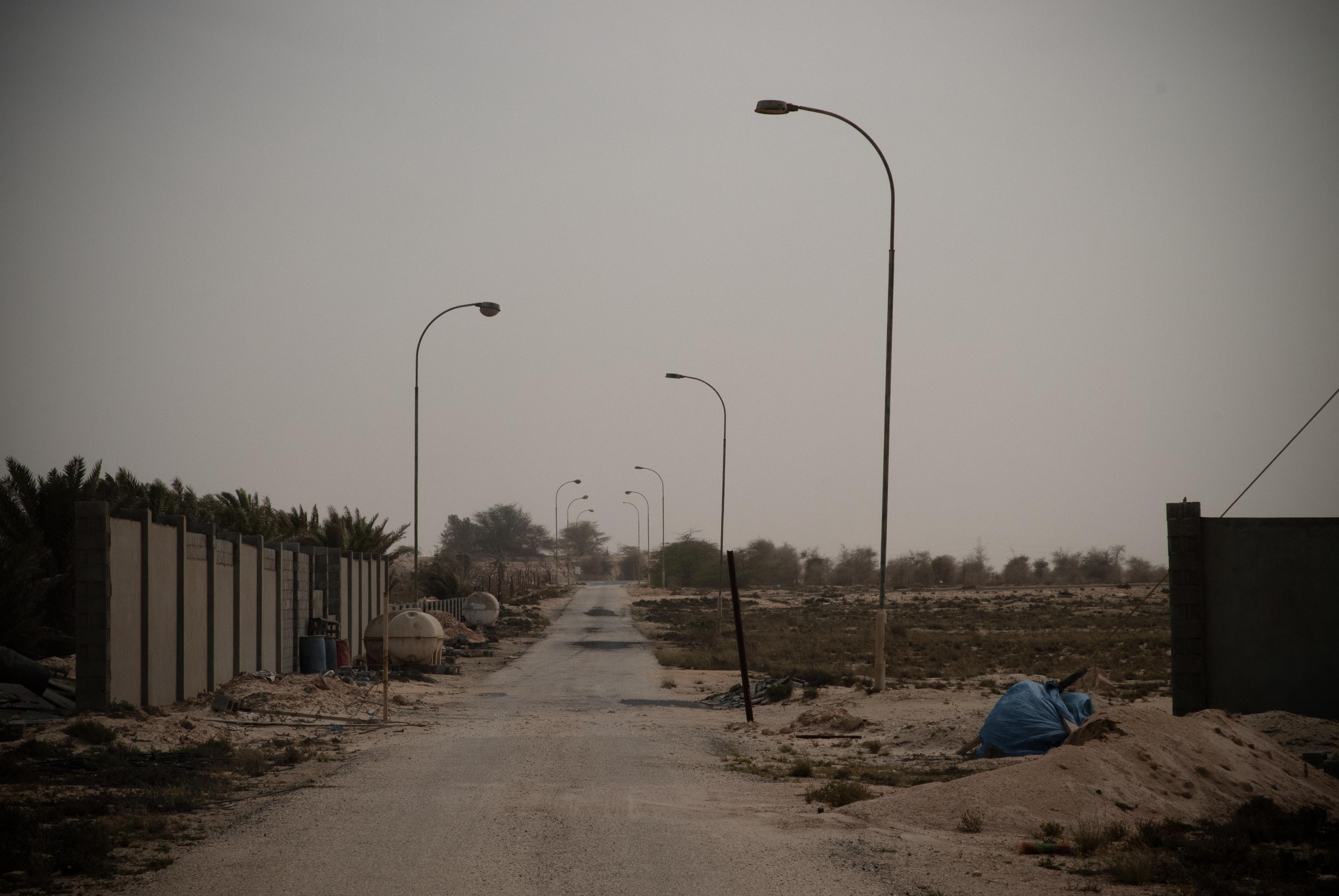
Road to Al Huwaila
