= Meryal Waterpark =

Water park in Lusail, Qatar

- Interactive map of Meryal Waterpark
- Location: Lusail, Qatar
- Coordinates: 25°25′54″N 51°31′54″E
- Owner: Qetaifan Islands

Attractions
- Total: 45
- Water rides: 52
- Website: meryalwaterpark.com

Meryal Waterpark is a water park located in Lusail, Qatar. It holds ICON Tower which is the tallest water slide structure in the world as declared by Guinness World Records, at 76.310 meters (250.36 ft).

The park hosts 45 rides and 52 slides. It is a popular tourism destination for families, particularly those with young children.

== Rig 1938 ==
The Rig 1938 is an 85 metre Iconic tower at Meryal Waterpark, proudly holding two Guinness World Records, the world tallest waterslide, standing at an impressive height of 76.310 metres, and the most waterslides from a single tower, with a total of 12 thrilling slides.

== Awards ==
- Winner:

Qatar Tourism Award in 2025.
World's Leading New Water Park 2024
Middle East's Leading New Tourist Attraction 2024

- Nominated:

Middle East's Leading Adventure Tourist Attraction 2026
Middle East's Leading Water Park 2026
Middle East's Leading Adventure Tourist Attraction 2025
Middle East's Leading Water Park 2025
