= Al Da'asa =

Archaeological site in Qatar

- دعسة (Arabic)
- Approximate location of Al Da'asa archaeological site
- 25°22′10″N 50°48′32″E
- Type: Settlement
- Periods: Neolithic period
- Cultures: Ubaid
- Location: Western Qatar

Site notes
- Excavation dates: 1961; 1978
- Archaeologists: Holger Kapel; Beatrice De Cardi

Al Da'asa (Arabic: دعسة) is an archaeological site located on the western coast of Qatar. It is the most extensive Ubaid site in the country. It was excavated by a Danish team in 1961.

The site is theorized to have accommodated a small seasonal encampment, possibly a lodging for a hunting-fishing-gathering group who made recurrent visits. This is evidenced by the discovery of nearly sixty hearths at the site, which may have been utilized to cure fish, in addition to flint tools such as scrapers, cutters, blades and arrow heads. Furthermore, many painted Ubaid potsherds and a carnelian bead were found in the fire pits, suggesting overseas connections.

In the mid-1900s, after oil was discovered to the north in Jebel Dukhan, the industrial city of Dukhan was formed to provide infrastructure and services for workers of the Dukhan oil fields. A village was established at Al Da'asa for oil workers employed in Dukhan.

== Etymology ==
According to the Ministry of Municipality and Environment, the word 'Da'asa' is an Arabic term used for footpaths, being so named for an old footpath found here.

== Archaeology ==
=== Discovery ===
Under the leadership of Danish archaeologist Holger Kapel, several flint sites in Qatar were excavated from 1960 to 1964. Al Da'asa, discovered in 1961, was the largest of these sites. A number of highly weathered potsherds were collected from the site for analysis. Shortly after, the site was revealed to a British excavation team who identified the potsherds as originating from the Ubaid period.

=== Excavations ===
In addition to the 1961 excavation led by Holger Kapel, the site was excavated again in 1978 by a team led by Beatrice de Cardi.

Quern stone fragments, hearths and Ubaid pottery were discovered during the first excavation. A carnelian bead and three fragments of red, non-Ubaid pottery, thought to originate from the Arabian coast, were also among the discoveries.

=== Occupation ===
Al Da'asa's residents are thought to have comprised fishermen or merchants from Ur. However, the stone tools uncovered are consistent with tools used elsewhere in Arabia during the Ubaid period and bear no resemblance to the tools used in southern Mesopotamia.

Postholes, meant for tents or huts, were noticed by the excavators. The large number of hearths suggests mass activity took place during its occupational period, and may be attributed to a relatively sizable population in which each family cooked in a separate fire pit. Another possibility is that the hearths were made to cure and dry large amounts of fish.

== Recent history ==
A village was established here in 1956 to provide housing for oil workers employed in the Dukhan industrial city. By 1990, the village had around 70 households. Aside from the oil industry, some of its inhabitants made their living from fishing and selling their catch in Doha.
