= Ar Rakiyat Fort =

Fort in Qatar

- قلعة الركيات
- Ar Rakiyat, Al Shamal, Qatar
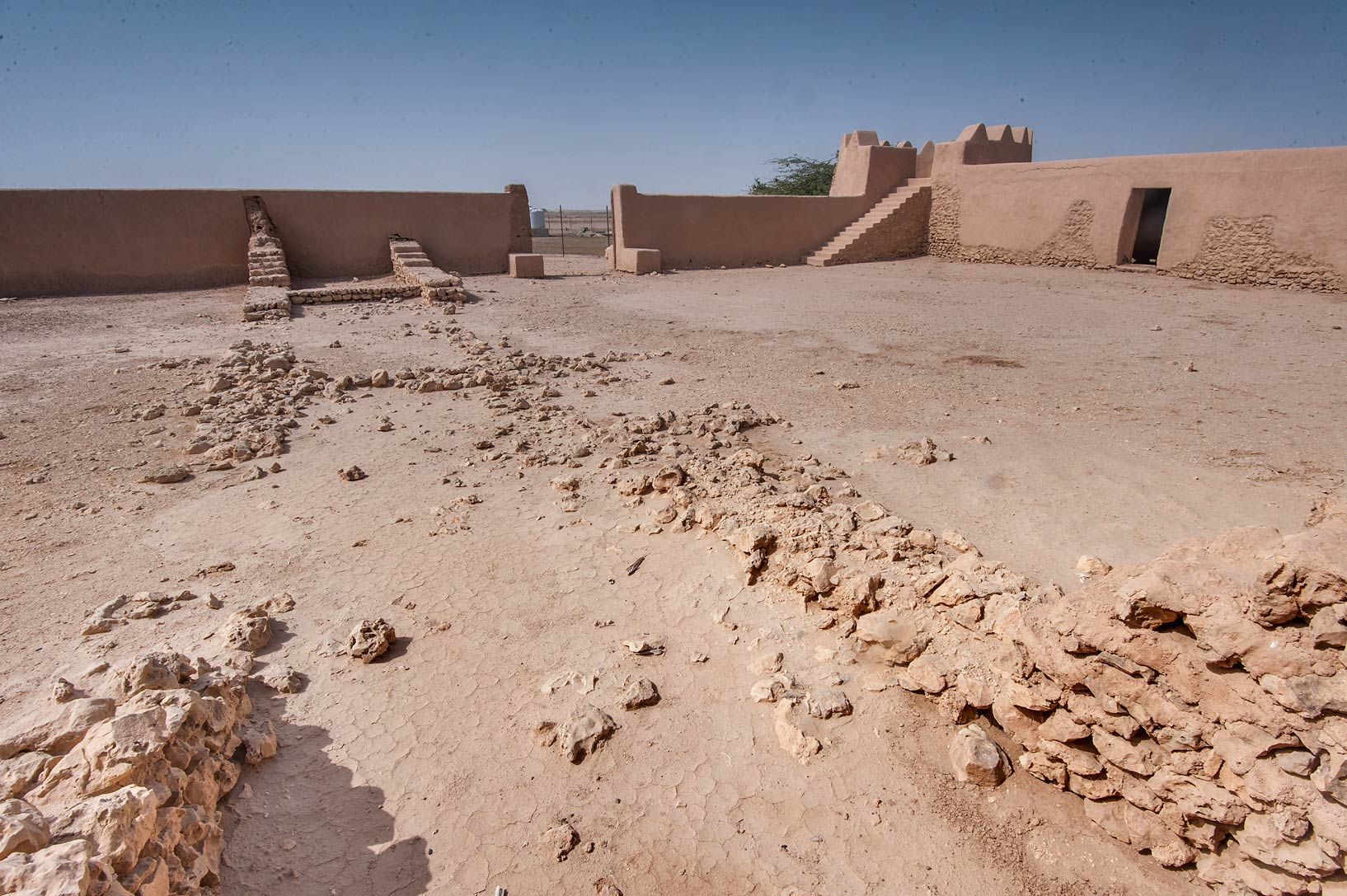
- Courtyard of Ar Rakiyat Fort

Site information
- Type: Historical fort
- Owner: Qatar Museums Authority

Location
- Coordinates: 26.03°N 51.08°E

Site history
- Built: 19th century
- In use: 19th–20th centuries

Ar Rakiyat Fort (Arabic: قلعة الركيات) is a historical fort located in north-west Qatar, in the municipality of Al Shamal. It was constructed in the 19th century near the village of Ar Rakiyat to protect water sources in the area. It was used as a defensive structure for the villagers in times of conflict. It is considered to be one of the larger forts in Qatar.

== Etymology ==
Ar Rakiyat refers to a 'well' in Arabic. It is also spelled as 'Al Rakayat' and 'Arkkiat'.

== History ==
The fort was most likely constructed during the 19th century. The main purpose of the fort was to protect the freshwater supply in the area. The abundance of water in the area is attested to by the presence of an active potable well with a depth of 5 kilometres (3.1 mi) near the fort, in addition to numerous small farms situated around the fort.

The antiquities department of Qatar Museums began excavations and restoration of the site in 1988. An Islamic coin dating to the Abbasid period, specifically between 749–846 AD, was discovered during excavations. However, Mohammed Al-Khulaifi, an employee of Qatar Museums, stated that the coin was not evidence that the fort existed during the Abbasid period.

It is thought that the fort was inhabited until the 20th century.

In 2022, the Department of Architectural Conservation of Qatar Museums completed the second restoration of the main structural building components using traditional building materials, including plastering, flooring, installation of a wooden ceiling, doors and pest control.

== Architecture ==
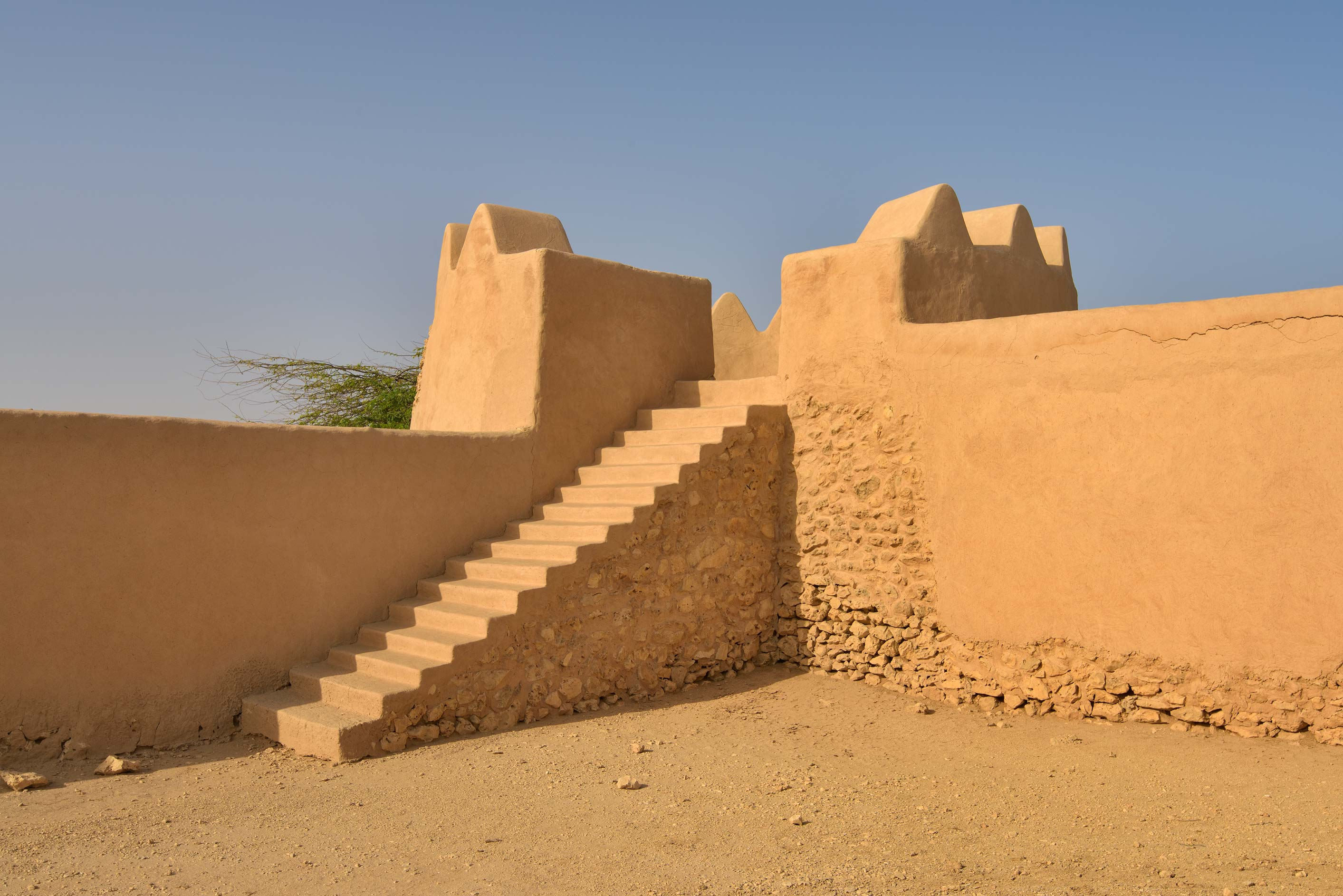
Stairway in Ar Rakiyat Fort

The overall structure of the fort is rectangular with dimensions of 22 by 38 m (72 by 125 ft). It has four towers; three rectangular and one cylindrical. The total height is at most 3 m (9.8 ft). A distinguishing characteristic of the fort is its complete absence of decorative elements. It only has one entrance, located on the southern wall, indicating its use as a defensive structure. Different materials were used in the construction of the fort. The lower portion was constructed using limestone and mud, while the top portion was constructed using lubnah (a mixture of mud and clay brick).

There are living quarters in the northern, eastern and western section of the fort. There are three stairways in the fort. The first is in the south-west portion of the courtyard and leads to the cylindrical tower. The second and third are located in the north-east and north-west corner of the fort and both lead to the roof. A date-press (madbassat) was discovered in a rectangular room in the central courtyard. A mosque is located to the immediate southwest of the fort.

== Geography ==
The fort is located in the vicinity of the abandoned village of Al Rakiyat in Al Shamal. It is 94 km (58 mi) northwest of the capital city of Doha. The ruined settlements of Al Khuwayr and Freiha are located within 5 km (3.1 mi) of the area.

== See also ==
- List of historical monuments in Qatar

== Bibliography ==
Kozah, Mario; Abu-Husayn, Abdulrahim; Al-Murikhi, Saif Shaheen; Al-Thani, Haya (2014). The Syriac Writers of Qatar in the Seventh Century (print ed.). Gorgias Press LLC. ISBN 978-1463203559.
