= Ar Rakiyat =

Ar Rakiyat الركية
- Abandoned village
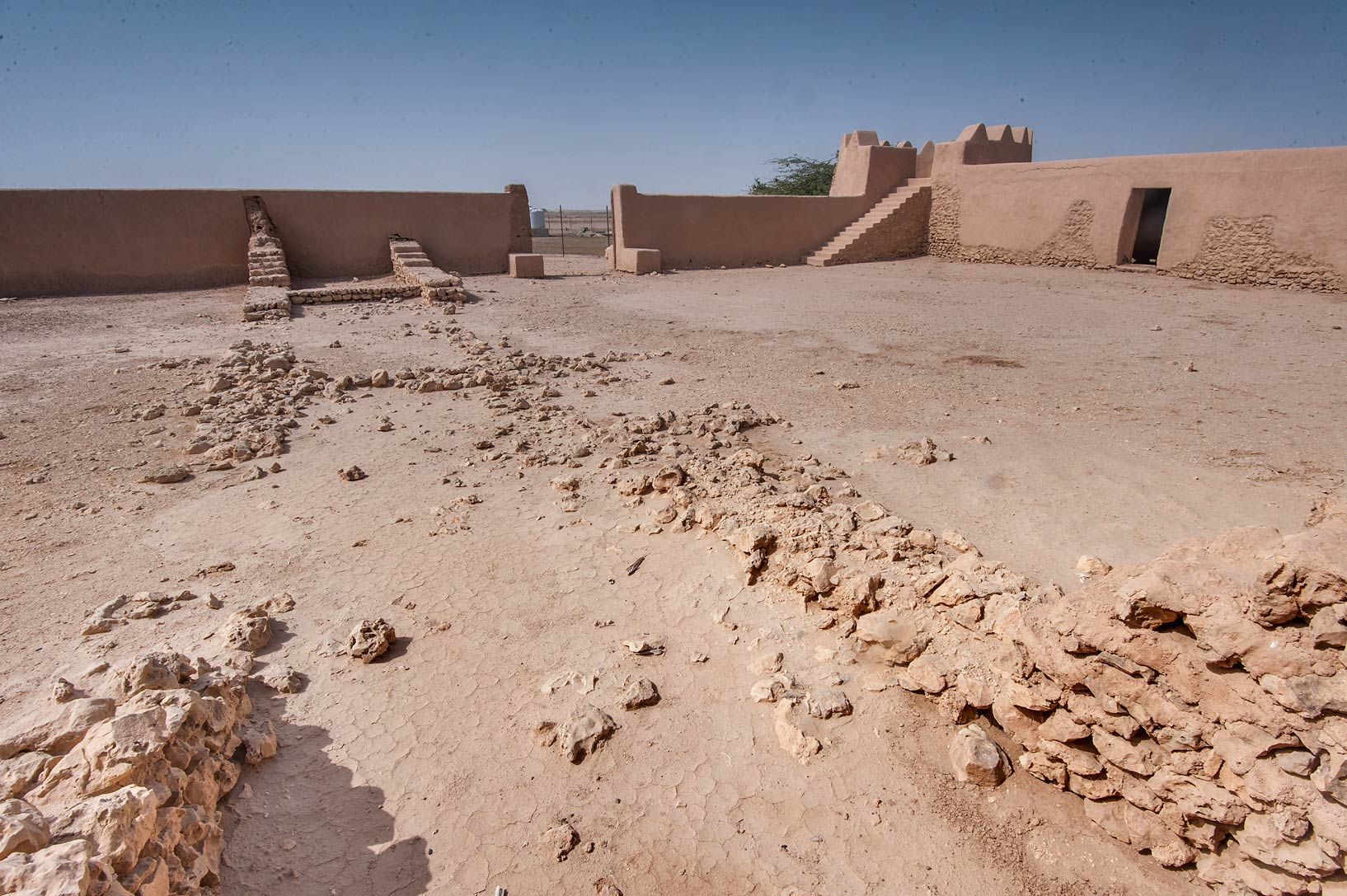
- Courtyard of Ar Rakiyat Fort

- Location in Qatar
- Coordinates: 26°3′2″N 51°7′49″E
- Country: Qatar
- Municipality: Ash Shamal

Ar Rakiyat (Arabic: الركية) is a village in Qatar, in the municipality of Ash Shamal. From the 19th to 20th centuries, the village obtained its water supply from the freshwater well in Ar Rakiyat Fort. The fort also provided refuge for its population in times of conflict.

== Etymology ==
Ar Rakiyat is an Arabic term used to denote a low area that has been excavated, typically for a well. The designation refers to the well within Ar Rakiyat Fort, from which the locality takes its name.

== History ==
In J. G. Lorimer's Gazetteer of the Persian Gulf, Ar Rakiyat is described as a settlement 5 miles (8.0 km) northwest of Zubarah and which is characterized by its ruined fort. Nearby abandoned settlements include Al Khuwayr, Al `Arish, Freiha and Ain Mohammed.

== Geography ==
Ar Rakiyat is located near the northwest coast. It forms part of the northern interior plain region. As such, the area around Ar Rakiyat is characterized by relatively flat terrain, typical of Qatar's interior regions.

== Gallery ==
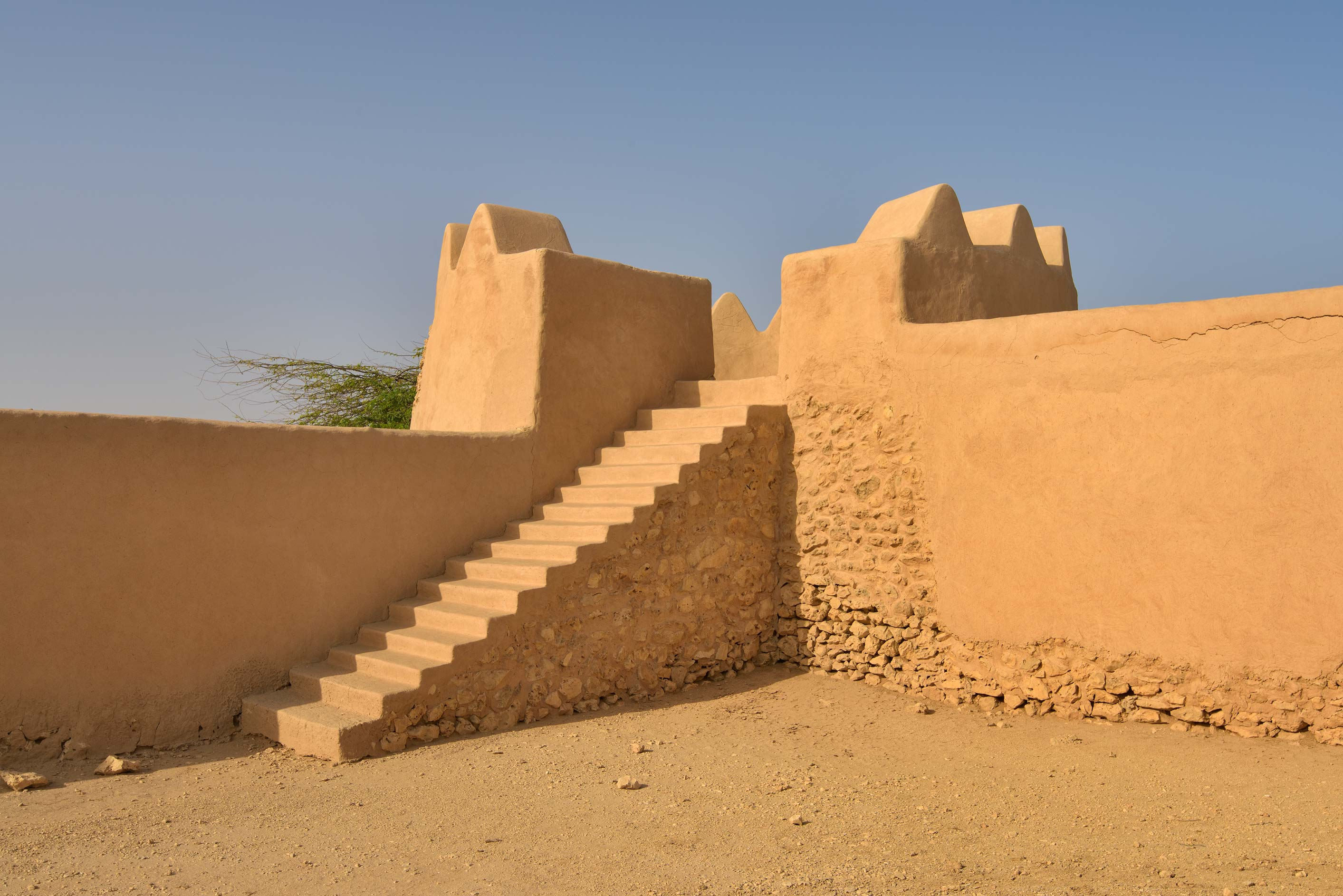
Stairway in Ar Rakiyat Fort.

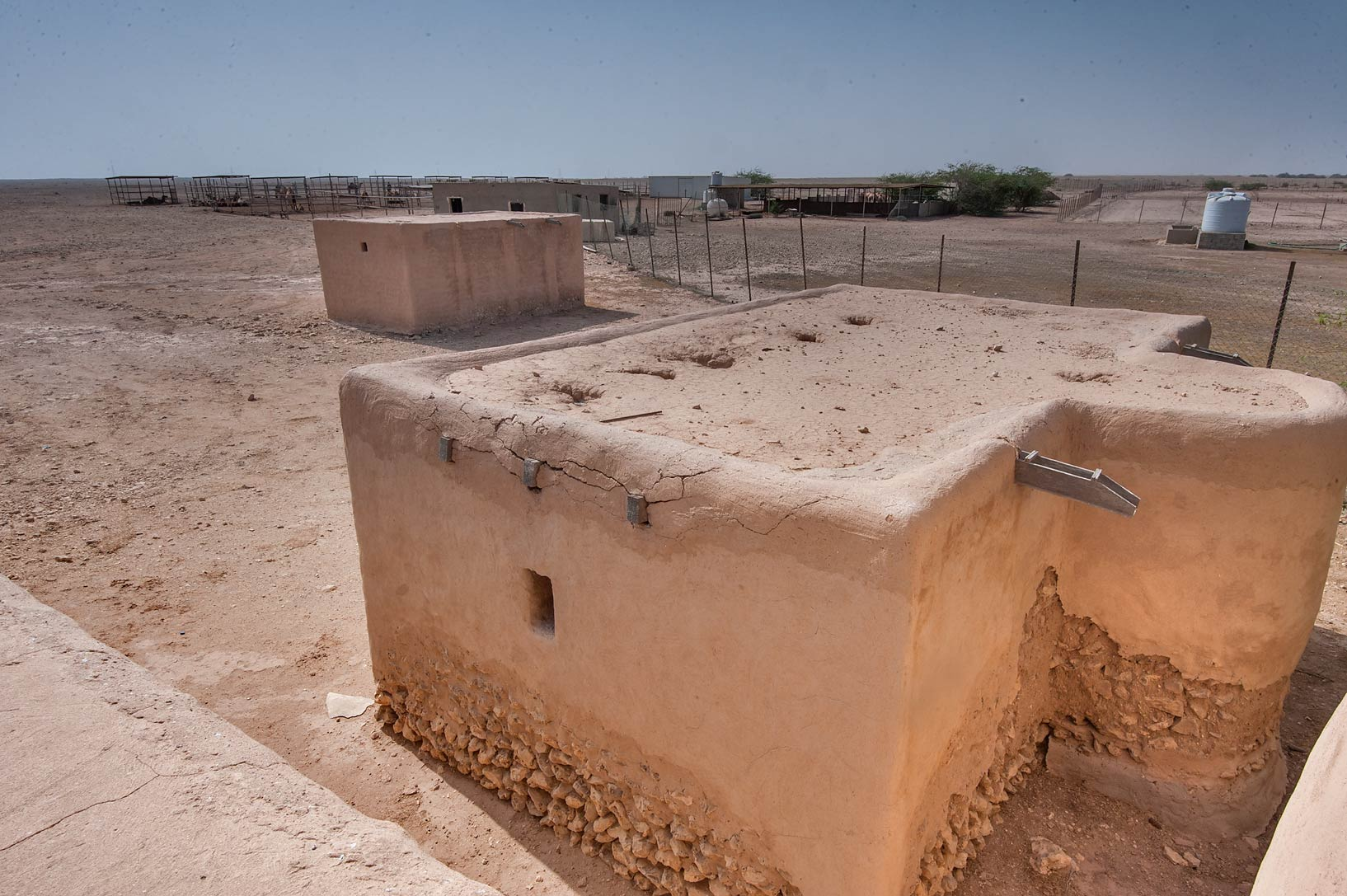
Stone mosque near Ar Rakiyat Fort.
