= Geoffrey Bibby =

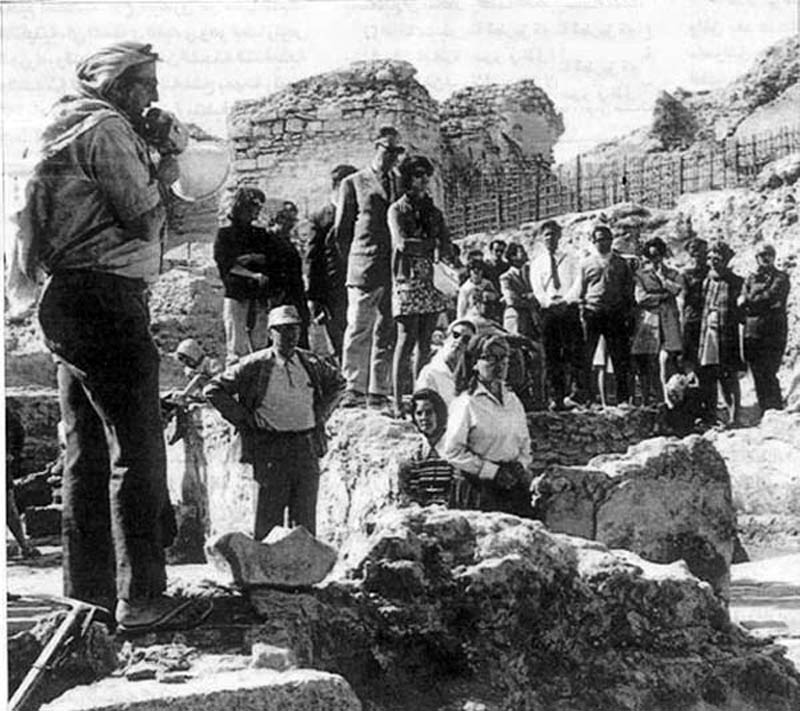
Geoffrey Bibby excavating the Bahrain Fort in the 1950s.

Thomas Geoffrey Bibby (14 October 1917 – 6 February 2001) was an English-born archaeologist. He is best known for discovering the ancient state of Dilmun, referred to in Mesopotamian mythology as a paradise. He is often considered to have been the pioneer of Arabian archaeology.

== Biography ==
Thomas Geoffrey Bibby was born on 14 October 1917, in Heversham, Westmorland, England. During the Second World War, he served the British intelligence agency. At one point, he was sent to join the Danish resistance.

He studied archaeology at Cambridge University prior to World War II, but because he could find no work in that profession after the war, he lived in Bahrain and worked for the Iraq Petroleum Company from 1947 to 1950. On a return visit to Britain he met his future wife, whom he married in 1949. Through her he met the Danish professor Peter Vilhelm Glob and so acquired a position at the University of Aarhus in Denmark.

== Excavations ==
In 1953, he and Professor Glob led a Danish team of archaeologists to Bahrain. The team focused its excavations primarily below the Qal'at al-Bahrain, originally a large stratified tell on the northern shores of the country. The site covered around 50 hectares and was dated to the Early Dilmun period, which was the first quarter of the second millennium BC. The team had initially found pottery from the pre-Early Dilmun period, dated to 2400 BC, to the Hellenic period of Bahraini history. Archaeologists have also discovered a short length of the early Second-millennium city wall and the fragmented plans of six houses in the site. The team also proceeded to excavate in Saar, Bahrain village, which led to the discovery of Saar temple which dated to the Dilmun era.

Bibby also wrote about stone and Bronze Age Europe, particularly the bog peoples of Denmark.

== Writings ==
- Bibby, Geoffrey (1956). The Testimony Of The Spade. Knopf.
- Bibby, Geoffrey (1961). Four Thousand Years Ago: A World Panorama of Life in the Second Millennium B. C. Literary Licensing. ISBN 9781258075057.
- Bibby, Phillips, Geoffrey, Carl (1961). Looking for Dilmun. Midpoint Trade Books. ISBN 9780905743905.
