= Beatrice de Cardi =

British archaeologist (1914–2016)

Beatrice de Cardi OBE FSA FBA
- Born: 5 June 1914; London, England
- Died: 5 July 2016 (aged 102); London, England
- Title: Secretary of the Council for British Archaeology (1949–73)
- Awards: Officer of the Order of the British Empire (1973); Burton Memorial Medal of the Royal Asiatic Society (1993); Gold Medal of the Society of Antiquaries of London (2014)

Academic background
- Education: St Paul's Girls' School
- Alma mater: University College London

Academic work
- Discipline: Archaeologist
- Sub-discipline: Specialist in the archeology of the Persian Gulf, Balochistan, Pakistan and Qatar

Beatrice Eileen de Cardi, OBE, FSA, FBA (5 June 1914 – 5 July 2016) was a British archaeologist, specializing in the study of the Persian Gulf and the Baluchistan region of Pakistan. She was president of the British Foundation for the Study of Arabia, and she was Secretary of the Council for British Archaeology from 1949 to 1973. At the end of her career, she was the world's oldest practising archaeologist.

== Early life and education ==
De Cardi was born in London on 5 June 1914, the second daughter of a Corsican father, Edwin de Cardi, and an American mother, Christine Berbette Wurfflein. She was educated at St Paul's Girls' School, although her schooling was interrupted by ill health. From 1933 to 1935 she studied history, Latin and economics at University College London. She also studied archaeology, under the prominent archaeologist Sir Mortimer Wheeler. She graduated with a Bachelor of Arts (BA) degree.

== Career ==
De Cardi received her earliest training as an assistant at the digs conducted by Wheeler and his wife Tessa at the Iron Age fort of Maiden Castle in southern England. Her role there involved learning to classify pottery, and led to a career-long interest. In 1936, after graduating, she was offered a position as Wheeler's secretary at the London Museum, where he held the position of Keeper. She later became his assistant.

During World War II de Cardi worked for the Allied Supplies Executive of the War Cabinet in China. She was based in Chungking but frequently visited India. She became fascinated with the region, and after the war, she became Britain's Assistant Trade Commissioner in Karachi, Delhi, and Lahore. From these locations she conducted archaeological surveys in western Baluchistan. De Cardi's work there involved collecting surface materials (including ceramic sherds, copper objects, bone and flint) from a number of sites in Jhalawan. Her expeditions were carried out with the assistance of an official from the Pakistani Archaeological Department, Sadar Din. Din had been recommended to de Cardi by Wheeler, who had taken a new position of Director General of Archaeology in India. Together, Din and de Cardi discovered 47 archaeological sites.

After an absence from the region due to political unrest, de Cardi returned to Baluchistan in 1966. She discovered distinctive pottery at sites near the Bampur River which led to a new understanding of the nature of trade links in the Persian Gulf region in the Bronze Age. She also carried out work in the Persian Gulf, and launched a number of expeditions in the United Arab Emirates that yielded the first examples of Ubaid pottery in the region. In this time she also discovered more than 20 tombs from the second millennium B.C.

In 1973, the government of Qatar appointed de Cardi to lead an archaeological expedition aiming to illustrate Qatar's history for its new national museum. Her team discovered domestic tools and pottery which suggested that Qatar had traded with other regions much longer ago than previously thought.

After working in Qatar, de Cardi continued to work in Oman and the United Arab Emirates. At around the age of 93 she ceased fieldwork and began to focus on writing and categorising her work.

Of her fieldwork generally, de Cardi stated in 2008, "I have never had any difficulties [...] I am not a woman or a man when I am working in the Gulf or anywhere else. I am a professional and they have always accepted that."

=== Honours ===
From 1949 to 1973, de Cardi served as assistant secretary, and then secretary, of the Council for British Archaeology. The Council founded an annual talk, the Beatrice de Cardi Lecture, in her honour in 1976. Later, the Council renamed its headquarters Beatrice de Cardi House.

In 1973, she was appointed Officer of the Order of the British Empire (OBE) for services to archaeology.

In 1989 de Cardi received the Al Qasimi Medal, presented to her for archaeological services to the United Arab Emirates state of Ras Al Khaimah. She was the first woman to receive the medal. In 1993 she received the Burton Memorial Medal from the Royal Asiatic Society. From 1995 de Cardi was an Honorary Fellow at University College London. In June 2014 she turned 100, and was awarded the Gold Medal of the Society of Antiquaries of London "for distinguished services to archaeology".

== Personal life ==
De Cardi's first fiancé died in World War II. Her second fiancé died in a riding accident in Qatar while working there with her.

De Cardi died in the Chelsea and Westminster Hospital on 5 July 2016 from complications from a fall that she had suffered almost six weeks earlier.

== Publications ==
- De Cardi, Beatrice. Excavations at Bampur, a Third Millennium Settlement in Persian Baluchistan, 1966. New York: American Museum of Natural History, 1970.
- De Cardi, Beatrice, and D. Brian Doe. Archaeological Survey in the Northern Trucial States. Rome, 1971.
- De Cardi, Beatrice, Qatar Archaeological Report. Qatar: Qatar National Museum, 1978.
- De Cardi, Beatrice. Archaeological Surveys in Baluchistan, 1948 and 1957. London: Institute of Archaeology, 1983.
- Phillips, C. S., Daniel T. Potts, Sarah Searight, and Beatrice De Cardi (eds.). Arabia and its neighbours: essays on prehistorical and historical developments presented in honour of Beatrice de Cardi. Turnhout: Brepols, 1998.
- De Cardi, Beatrice. The De Cardi Family in Britain. London, 2006.
- De Cardi, Beatrice. "Exploring the Lower Gulf, 1947–2007" in Antiquity: A Quarterly Review of World Archaeology, Vol. 82, no. 315, p. 165-77.
