= Zone 78, Qatar =

Zone 78
- Zone
- Interactive map of Zone 78
- Coordinates: 25.986091°N 51.096329°E
- Country: Qatar
- Municipality: Al Shamal
- Blocks: 53

Area
  - Total: 427.2 km^{2} (164.9 sq mi)

Population
  - Total: 1,660 (2,015)
- Time zone: UTC+03 (Arabia Standard Time)
- ISO 3166 code: QA-MS

Zone 78 is a zone of the municipality of Al Shamal in the state of Qatar. The main districts recorded in the 2015 population census were Abu Dhalouf and Zubarah.

Other districts which fall within its administrative boundaries are Ain Al Nuaman, Ain Mohammed, Al `Arish, Al Jumail, Al Khuwayr, Al Nabaah, Ar Rakiyat, Ath Thaqab, Freiha, Ghaf Makin, Khidaj, Lisha, Murwab, Ruwayda, Sidriyat Makin, Umm Al Hawa'ir, Umm Al Kilab, Umm al Qubur, Umm Jasim, Yusufiyah.

== Demographics ==
Year	Population
1986	663
1997	621
2004	579
2010	1,009
2015	1,660

== Land use ==
The Ministry of Municipality and Environment (MME) breaks down land use in the zone as follows.

Area (km^{2})	Developed land (km^{2})	Undeveloped land (km^{2})	Residential (km^{2})	Commercial/ Industrial (km^{2})	Education/ Health (km^{2})	Farming/ Green areas (km^{2})	Other uses (km^{2})
427.24	21.88	405.36	0.32	0.00	0.00	8.78	12.78
