= Zone 79, Qatar =

Zone 79
- Zone
- Interactive map of Zone 79
- Coordinates: 26.100915°N 51.272929°E
- Country: Qatar
- Municipality: Al Shamal
- Blocks: 78

Area
  - Total: 166.6 km^{2} (64.3 sq mi)

Population (2015)
  - Total: 5,407
- Time zone: UTC+03 (Arabia Standard Time)
- ISO 3166 code: QA-MS

Zone 79 is a zone of the municipality of Al Shamal in Qatar. The main districts recorded in the 2015 population census were Madinat ash Shamal, the municipal seat, and Ar Ru'ays.

Other districts which fall within its administrative boundaries of the municipality are Al `Adhbah, Al Ghariyah, Al Khasooma, Al Mafjar, Al Qa`abiyah, Al Zeghab, and Ras Al Shindwie.

== Demographics ==
Year	Population
1986	2,712
1997	2,456
2004	2,951
2010	4,996
2015	5,407

== Land use ==
The Ministry of Municipality and Environment (MME) breaks down land use in the zone as follows.

Area (km^{2})	Developed land (km^{2})	Undeveloped land (km^{2})	Residential (km^{2})	Commercial/ Industrial (km^{2})	Education/ Health (km^{2})	Farming/ Green areas (km^{2})	Other uses (km^{2})
166.63	15.88	150.75	1.59	0.18	0.23	5.58	8.3
