= Al Shamal =

Municipality in Qatar

Al Shamal ٱلشَّمَال (Arabic)
- Municipality
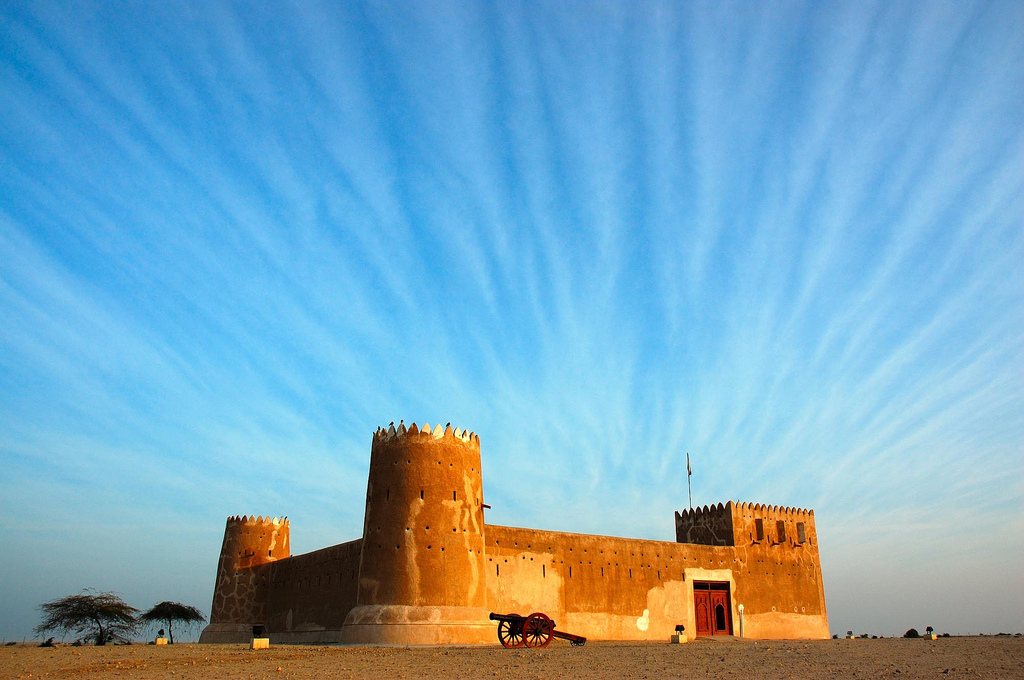
- Al Zubara Fort
- Interactive map of Al Shamal
- Coordinates (Madinat ash Shamal): 26.07°N 51.13°E
- Country: Qatar
- Capital: Madinat ash Shamal
- Zones: 3

Government
  - Mayor: Hamad Jumaa Al Mannai

Area
  - Total: 859.8 km^{2} (332.0 sq mi)

Population (2015)
  - Total: 8,794
  - Density: 10.23/km^{2} (26.49/sq mi)
- Time zone: UTC+03 (East Africa Time)
- ISO 3166 code: QA-MS

Al Shamal (Arabic: ٱلشَّمَال, romanized: Ash Shamāl, lit. 'the north') is a municipality in Qatar. Its seat is Madinat ash Shamal and it is considered to be one of the major cities in Qatar, although its population is barely over 7,000. The seat's name translates to "city of the north".

Ras Rakan, the Qatar Peninsula's northernmost point, is included in the municipality, and is surrounded by the Persian Gulf in all directions except for the south. It borders the municipality of Al Khor. The municipality is divided into three primary zones.

== History ==
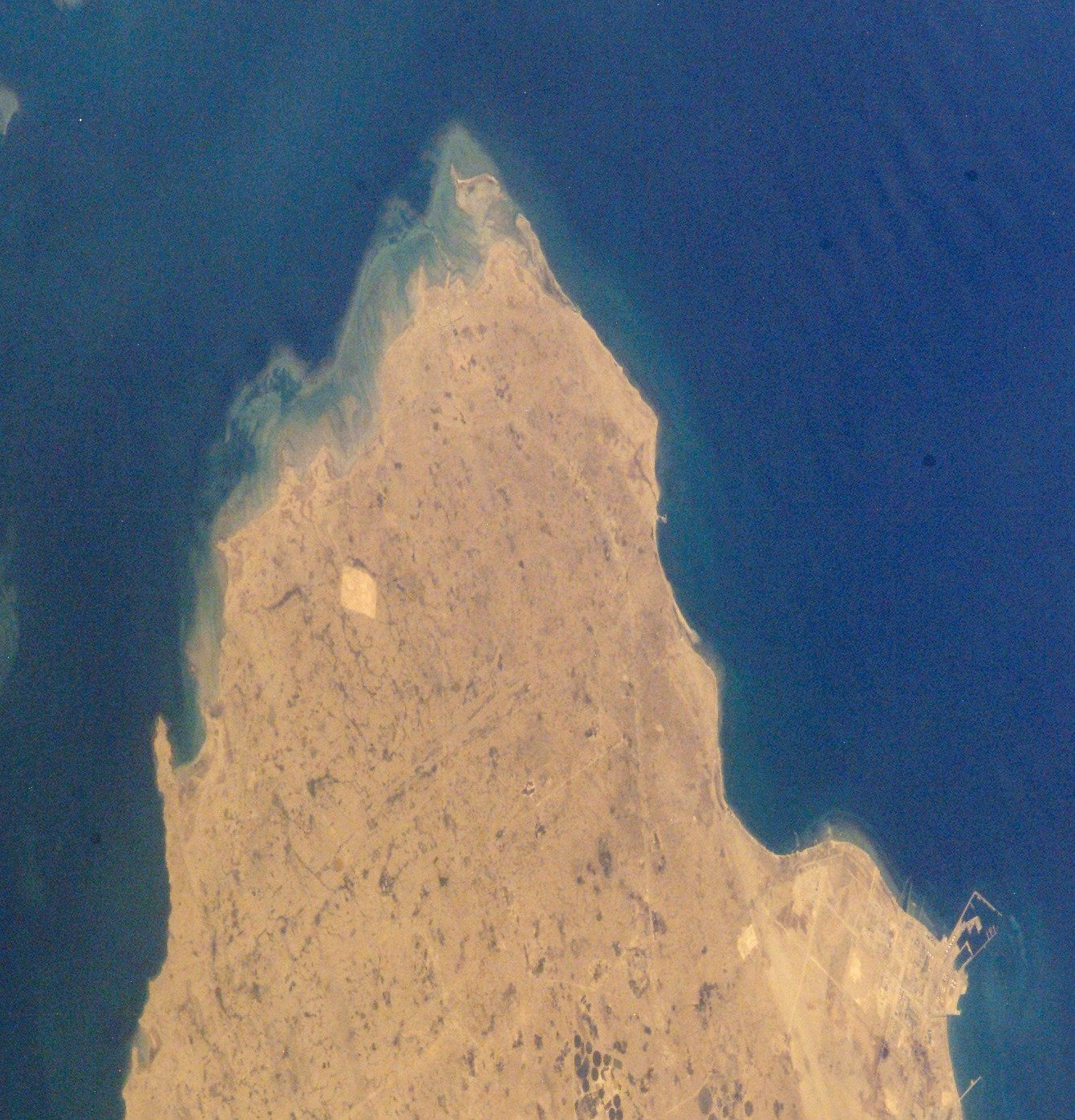
Satellite imagery of the northern Qatar Peninsula.

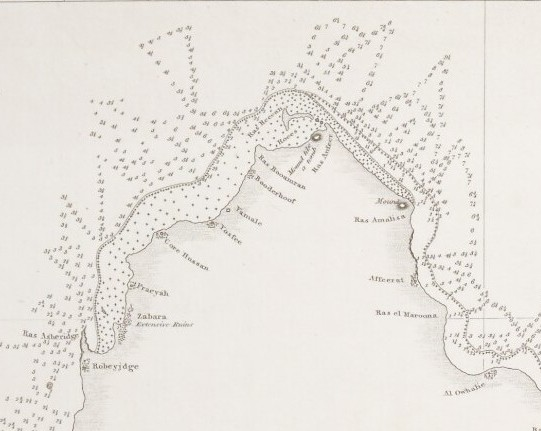
Map of the northern Qatar Peninsula in 1824 denoting the most important settlements, all of which currently fall within municipal boundaries.

Al Shamal Municipality was established in July 1972 alongside Qatar's four other initial municipalities.

Accommodating less than 9,000 inhabitants, Al Shamal is the least populous municipality in the country. As it comprises the northernmost portion of the country, its historic importance is attributed to its more moderate weather and close proximity to Bahrain.

The traditional mainstay of its inhabitants was fishing and pearling. As early as the 16th century, Al Huwaila, located on the east coast of Al Shamal, served as Qatar's chief town. It was eventually overtaken by Al Zubarah, a town located in the western section of the municipality, which grew to be the largest and most important settlement in Qatar during the 18th century. A survey conducted by the British Hydrographic Office in 1890 reflects on the subsequent abandonment of Al Zubarah and also provides details of the surrounding area's geography:

"Ras Ashiraj [Ras Ushayriq] is a low rocky point, 16 miles S.W. of Ras Rakkin, to the eastward of which is a bay 1½ miles deep, but shallow. On the east side of this bay stands the once important town of Zubara, of which extensive ruins are still to be seen; it is now abandoned, and the inhabitants have removed to Moreyr [Murair]. Vessels from Bahrain to Zubara generally sight Ras Rakkin, and then skirt the shore reef in 4 or 5 fathoms, till Khor Hassan tower is sighted. The large fort at Moreyr should then be seen; it is situated on slightly rising ground, about 1½ miles inland, between Zubara and Fariha."

A unique partnership between coastal and inland villages was historically prevalent. Groundwater was very difficult to obtain from settlements located directly on the coast due to the intrusion of seawater. Thus, coastal villages would trade marine resources such as fish in exchange for resources obtainable only from inland areas such as freshwater and crops. Examples of these historical partnerships include the Fuwayrit–Zarqa partnership and the Al Ghariyah–Al `Adhbah partnership. Another way settlements obtained freshwater was by excavating depressions to create small reservoirs that would fill during the rainy season.

Proceeding the discovery of oil, most of Al Shamal's population migrated to the capital Doha. In the mid-20th century, the region once again experienced significant population outflow due to upper aquifer salinization resulting from the overuse of diesel-powered water pumps. Nonetheless, once Qatar began reaping profits from its oil extraction activities, many northern settlements became repopulated as it became feasible to transport water over longer distances.

== Geography ==
Accounting for roughly 7% of Qatar's overall landmass, Al Shamal is the northernmost municipality, its outermost point being Ras Rakan. It has around 80 km (50 mi) of coastline. According to the Ministry of Municipality and Environment, the municipality has 101 depressions, 41 wadis, 51 streams, 77 plains, 13 hills, three highlands, 12 sabkhas, 12 capes, one bay, and three coral reefs. Three islands are found off its shores: Jazirat Al Khuwayr, Jazirat Umm Tais, and the northern extremity of Jazirat Ras Rakan.

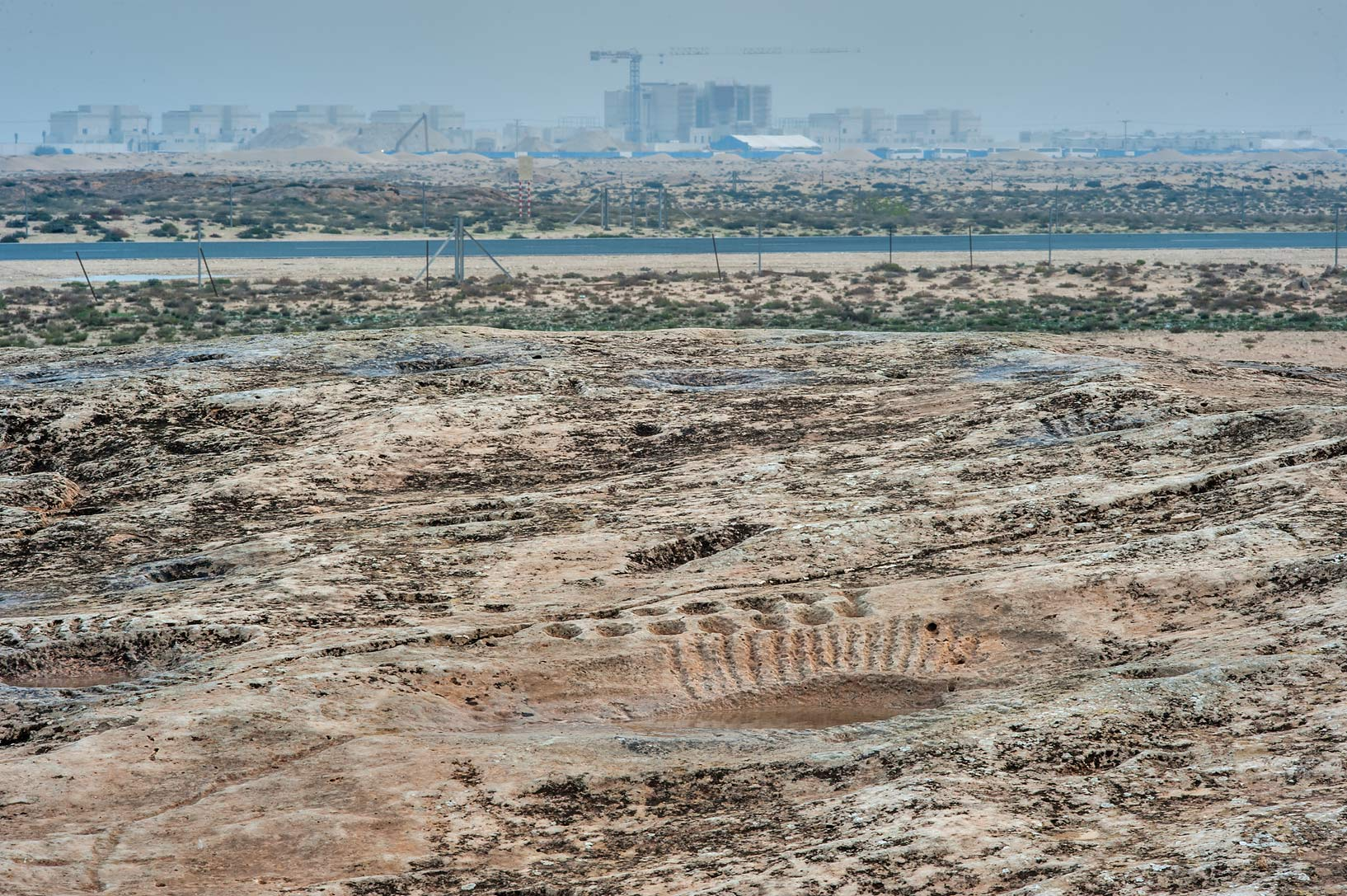
View to the east from Jebel Jassassiyeh on the north-east coast.

Abu Dhalouf and Ar Ru'ays were the largest villages on the northern coastline until the 1970s, when the Qatari government enacted a plan to establish Madinat ash Shamal between these two villages. Throughout the 1970s, a road system and a port were built to connect the three villages. Development of Madinat ash Shamal continued through the 1980s and 1990s, whereas urban developments were carried out on the adjacent settlements of Abu Dhalouf and Ar Ru'ays in the 2000s. At present, these three villages are the commercial and administrative centers of the municipality.

The majority of Al Shamal's settlements are rural, consisting mainly of small villages and farms. Most of Qatar's archaeological sites, abandoned villages and protected areas can be found in the municipality. Development is mainly oriented towards the three adjacent villages of Madinat ash Shamal, Abu Dhalouf and Ar Ru'ays, and the village of Ain Sinan, with the bulk of development occurring in Madinat ash Shamal.

=== Climate ===
The following is climate data for the town of Ar Ru'ays on the northern coast.

Climate data for Ar Ru'ays
Month	Jan	Feb	Mar	Apr	May	Jun	Jul	Aug	Sep	Oct	Nov	Dec	Year
Mean daily maximum °C (°F)	22 (72)	24 (75)	28 (82)	34 (93)	39 (102)	42 (108)	43 (109)	43 (109)	40 (104)	35 (95)	30 (86)	25 (77)	34 (93)
Mean daily minimum °C (°F)	13 (55)	14 (57)	17 (63)	22 (72)	27 (81)	30 (86)	31 (88)	32 (90)	29 (84)	26 (79)	18 (64)	14 (57)	23 (73)
Average precipitation mm (inches)	13 (0.5)	2 (0.1)	2 (0.1)	5.5 (0.22)	1 (0.0)	0 (0)	0 (0)	0 (0)	0 (0)	0.5 (0.02)	15 (0.6)	23 (0.9)	62 (2.44)
Average relative humidity (%)	77	71	57	52	41	40	43	53	58	61	70	83	59
Source: Qatar Statistics Authority

== Administration ==
The municipality is divided into 3 zones which are then divided into 162 blocks. According to municipal officials, there are approximately 28 rural settlements of varying sizes situated outside the Madinat ash Shamal area. The majority of these settlements are nestled along Al Shamal Road. There is also a high propensity of abandoned villages scattered throughout the municipality.

=== Administrative zones ===
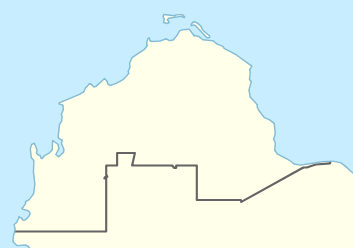
Approximate locations of the census districts of Al Shamal.

The following zones were recorded in the 2015 population census:

Zone no.	Census districts	Area	Population (2015)
77	Ain Sinan; Madinat Al Kaaban; Fuwayrit	266 km^{2} (103 sq mi)	1,727
78	Abu Dhalouf; Zubarah	427.2 km^{2} (164.9 sq mi)	1,660
79	Madinat ash Shamal; Ar Ru'ays	166.6 km^{2} (64.3 sq mi)	5,407
Municipality		859.8 km^{2} (332.0 sq mi)	8,794

=== Other settlements ===
Other settlements, abandoned villages and sites of interest in Al Shamal include:

- Ain Al Nuaman – village near the municipality's south-west coast.
- Ain Mohammed – abandoned village near the municipality's north-west coast. Hosts the Ain Mohammed Fort.
- Al `Adhbah – village near the municipality's north-east coast.
- Al `Arish – abandoned fishing village near the municipality's north-west coast.
- Al Ghariyah – village near the municipality's north-east coast.
- Al Ghashamiya – village near the municipality's east coast.
- Al Huwaila – abandoned village near the municipality's south-east coast. Previously served as Qatar's main town before the emergence of Zubarah and Fuwayrit.
- Al Jumail – abandoned fishing village near the municipality's north-west coast.
- Al Khasooma – coastal area near the municipality's north coast, east of Ar Ru'ays.
- Al Khuwayr – abandoned fishing village near the municipality's north-west coast.
- Al Mafjar – abandoned village near the municipality's north-east coast.
- Al Marroona – village near the municipality's south-east coast.
- Al Nabaah – abandoned village near the municipality's north-west coast.
- Al Qa`abiyah – village near the north-center of Al Shamal.
- Al Zeghab – village on the outskirts of Madinat ash Shamal.
- Ar Rakiyat – village near the municipality's north-west coast.
- Ath Thaqab – village near the municipality's north-west coast.
- Freiha – abandoned village near the municipality's south-west coast. It is closely associated with the historic town of Zubarah.
- Ghaf Makin – village near the municipality's north-west coast.
- Jebel Jassassiyeh – abandoned village near the municipality's north-east coast.
- Khidaj – abandoned village near the municipality's north-west coast.
- Lejthaya – village near the municipality's south-east coast.
- Lisha – village near the municipality's east coast.
- Murwab – abandoned village near the municipality's south-west coast. It constitutes one of Qatar's largest Islamic-era settlements.
- Ras Al Shindwie – village near the municipality's northern tip.
- Ruwayda – abandoned village near the municipality's north-west coast. It constitutes one of Qatar's largest archaeological sites.
- Safya – village near the municipality's east coast, to the immediate south of the original village of Fuwayrit.
- Sidriyat Makin – village near the municipality's north-west coast.
- Umm Al Ghaylam – village near the north-center of Al Shamal.
- Umm Al Hawa'ir – village near the municipality's north-east coast.
- Umm Al Kilab – village near the center of Al Shamal.
- Umm al Qubur – abandoned village near the municipality's south-west coast.
- Umm Al Shuwail – abandoned site containing a fort located 1.1 km east of Zubarah.
- Umm Jasim – village near the municipality's north-west coast.
- Yoghbi – abandoned village near the municipality's south-west coast. It accommodates the earliest known Islamic-era settlement in Qatar.
- Yusufiyah – abandoned village near the municipality's north-west coast.
- Zarqa – village near the municipality's north-east coast.

=== Organizational structure ===
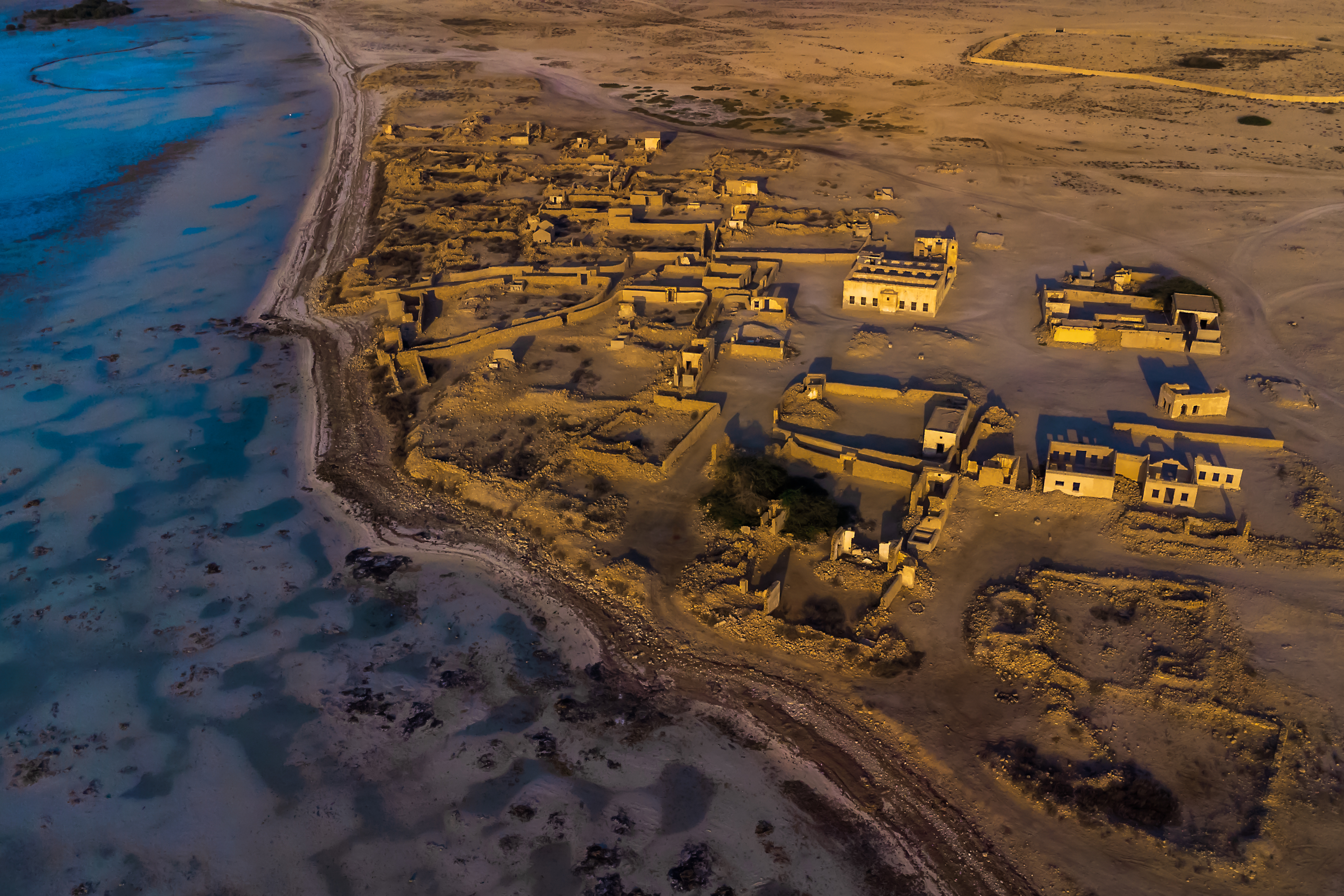
Ruins of Al Jumail fishing village near the northern tip

Ash-Shamal Municipality comprises four principal departments headed and managed by Hamad Jumaa Al Mannai, mayor of ash-Shamal Municipality as of 2016.

The director's office, heading the director's assistants and the heads of the following departments:

- Municipal Control Department
- Services Department
- Public Affairs Department
- Technical Affairs Department

== Infrastructure ==
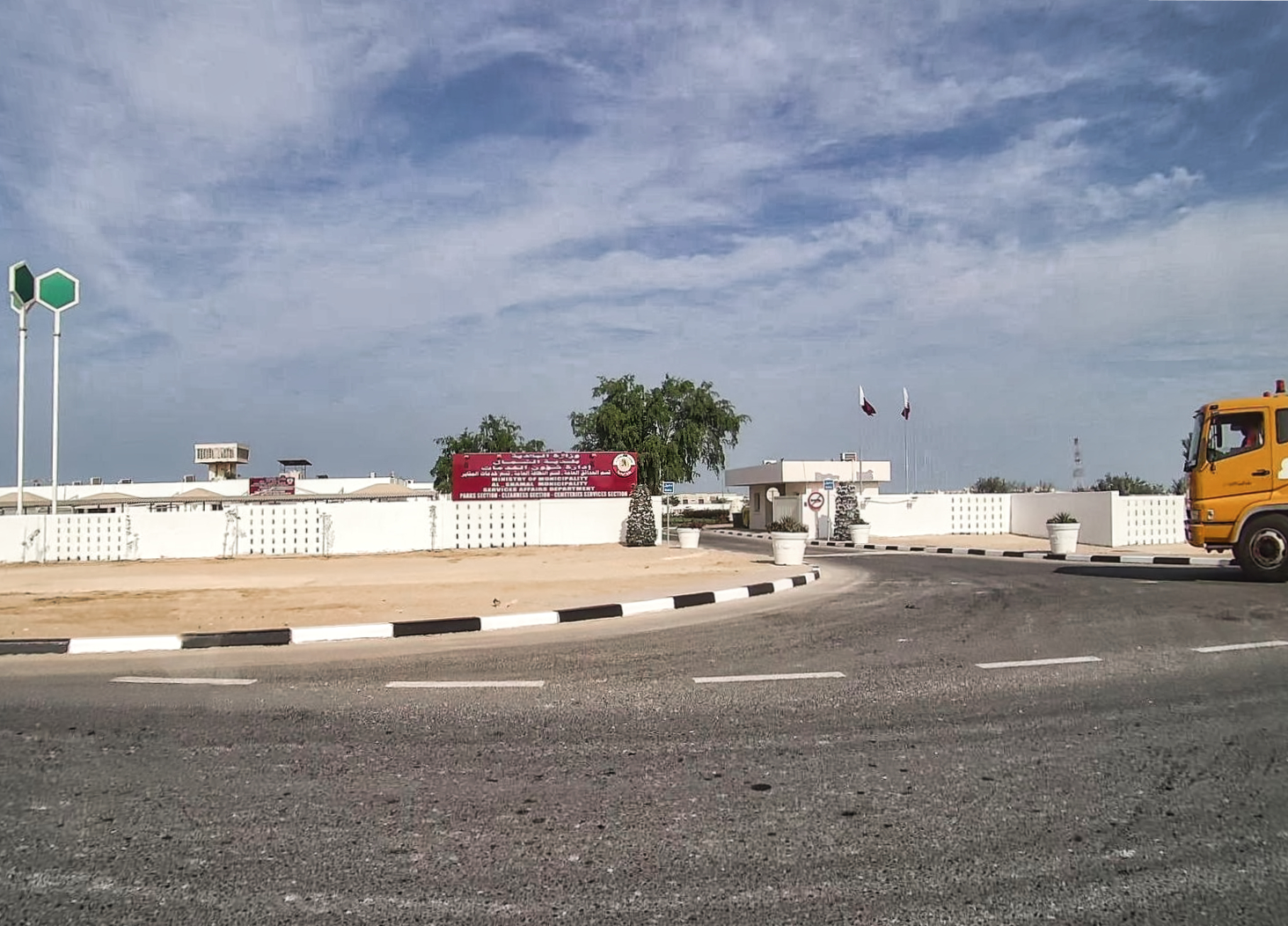
Outside view of Al Shamal Health Centre.

=== Education ===
Government statistics indicate that in 2015 the municipality accommodated 8 schools. The majority of these schools are located in the northern portion of the municipality.

Madinat ash Shamal joined the UNESCO Global Network of Learning Cities in 2019.

=== Healthcare ===
There is one primary healthcare center in the municipality, located in Madinat ash Shamal. Residents in Al Shamal's eastern section, including Ain Sinan, are served by healthcare centers in Al Khor.

=== Development projects ===
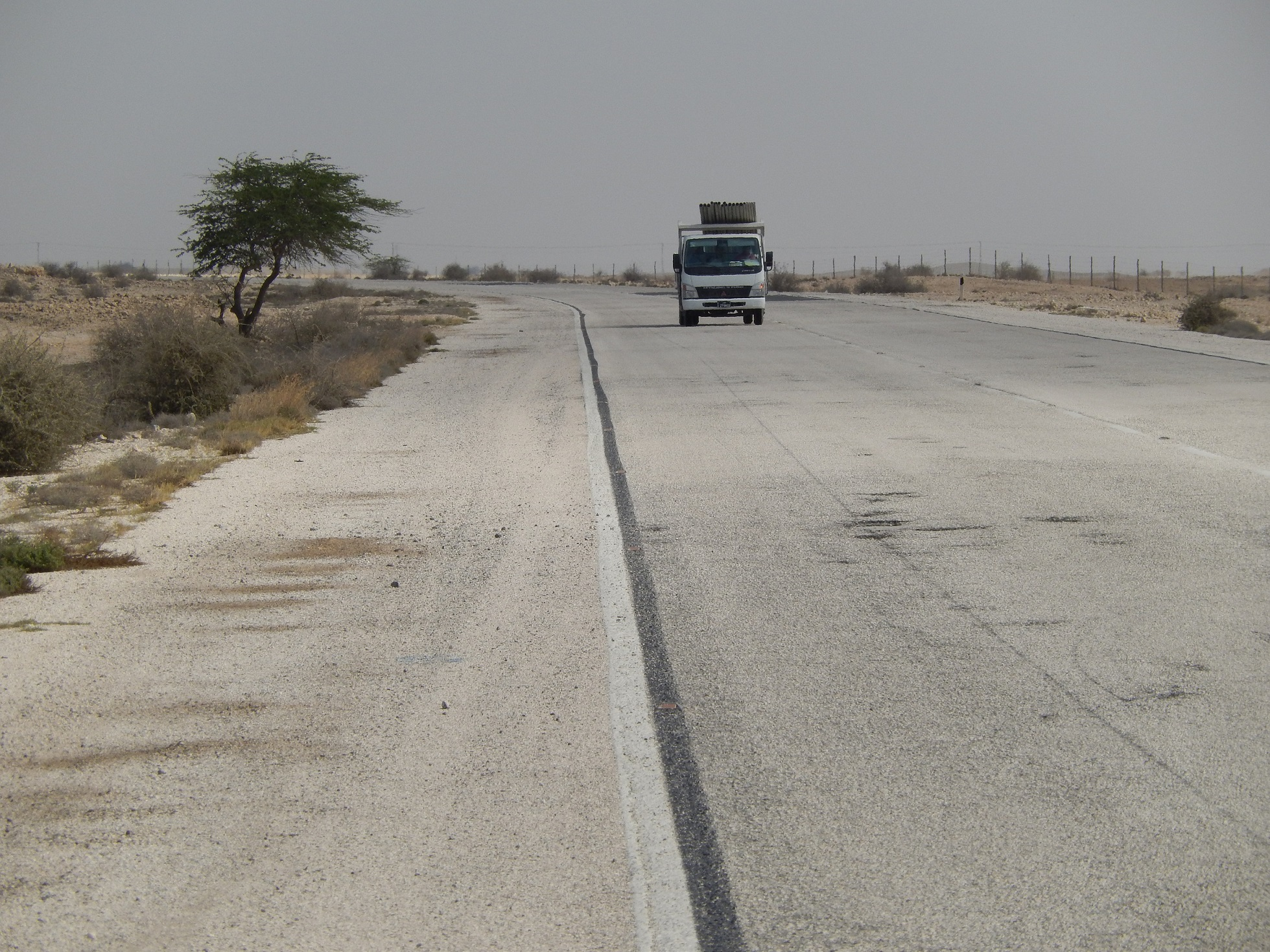
Road from Zubarah to Al Khor Municipality.

Commercial fishing activities and cargo transport take place primarily at Ar Ru'ays Port, one of the three primary ports of Qatar. Starting in 2010, the Public Works Authority (Ashghal) in Qatar carried out development on the port. The development included construction of a basin, deepening the channel at 2900 meter length, passenger jetty, commercial crew jetty, protection wall, storage areas, government offices, workshops, and passenger terminal building. Ar Ru'ays Port Development Project, which has the stated aim of "transforming Ar Ru'ays Port into northern Qatar's pathway to the world", was launched in January 2015.

North of Fuwayrit, a major desalination plant is under development, while an expansion of a sewage treatment situated south of Madinat ash Shamal will supply local farmers with treated sewage effluent for agricultural use.

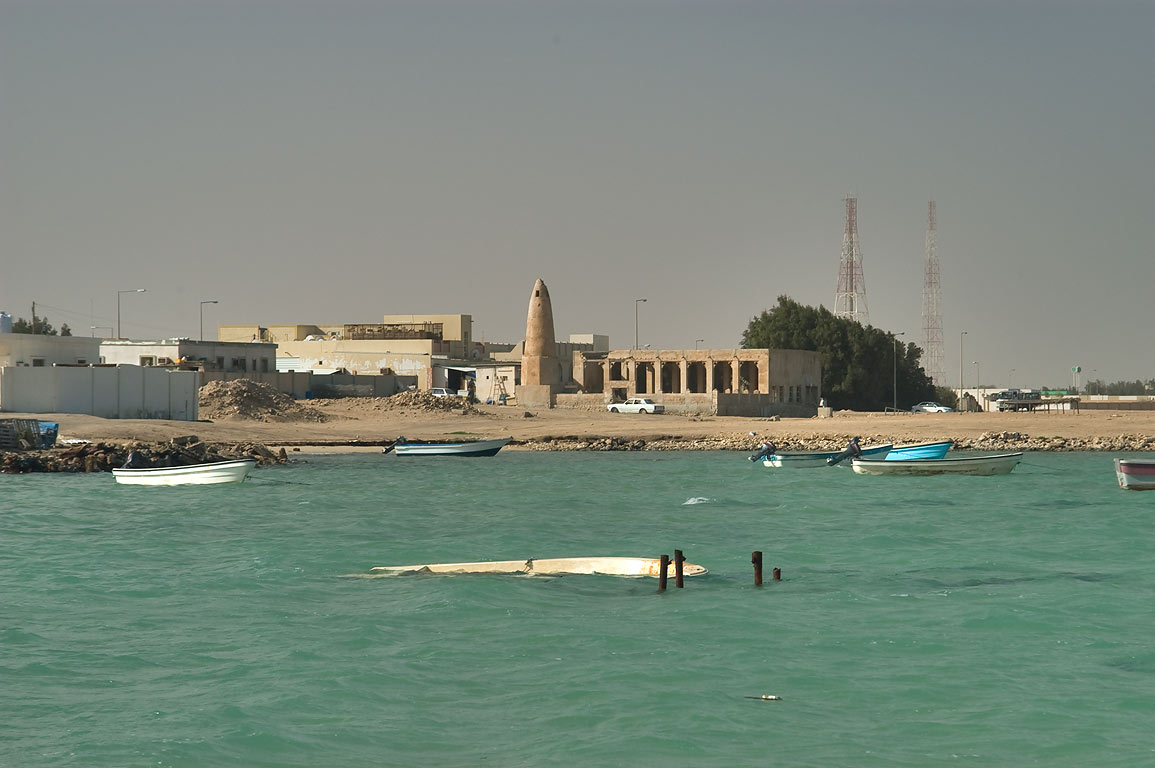
Beach in Ar Ru'ays.

The Public Works Authority (Ashghal) unveiled in October 2017 that they had begun the process of implementing more than 20 construction projects in the municipality at a cost exceeding QR 2.2 billion with a planned completion date of 2022. Roughly 60% of the total budget was to be spent on improving already-existing infrastructure while the remainder would be spent on funding new projects.

As part of the plan, the municipality's transport system would see major improvements with its 73 km (45 mi) road system being renovated and the construction of 12 new intersections, 28 km (17 mi) of sidewalks, 8,000 parking spaces and 3,680 light poles. Most of these renovations and additions are set to take place near the municipality's major cities on its northern tip and its eastern section, near Al Huwailah. Also in the works was a 91 km (57 mi) sewage network. Most major sanitation facilities are to be located near Madinat ash Shamal and Ar Ru'ays. In Madinat ash Shamal, a 25,000 m^{2} (270,000 sq ft) healthcare facility and six educational institutes are to be constructed as part of this project. Furthermore, several of the construction projects are intended to supplement the Ar Ru'ays Port.

=== Transport ===
Al Shamal Road is the major highway facilitating travel to the capital Doha, as well as between many villages within the municipality. Another important road is Al Zubarah Road, which links Zubarah to the Al Khor Municipality. The Qatar–Bahrain Causeway was a major development project which would provide a causeway between Qatar and Bahrain near the town of Zubarah, however, after several postponements, it is unclear if the project is still underway.

== Economy ==
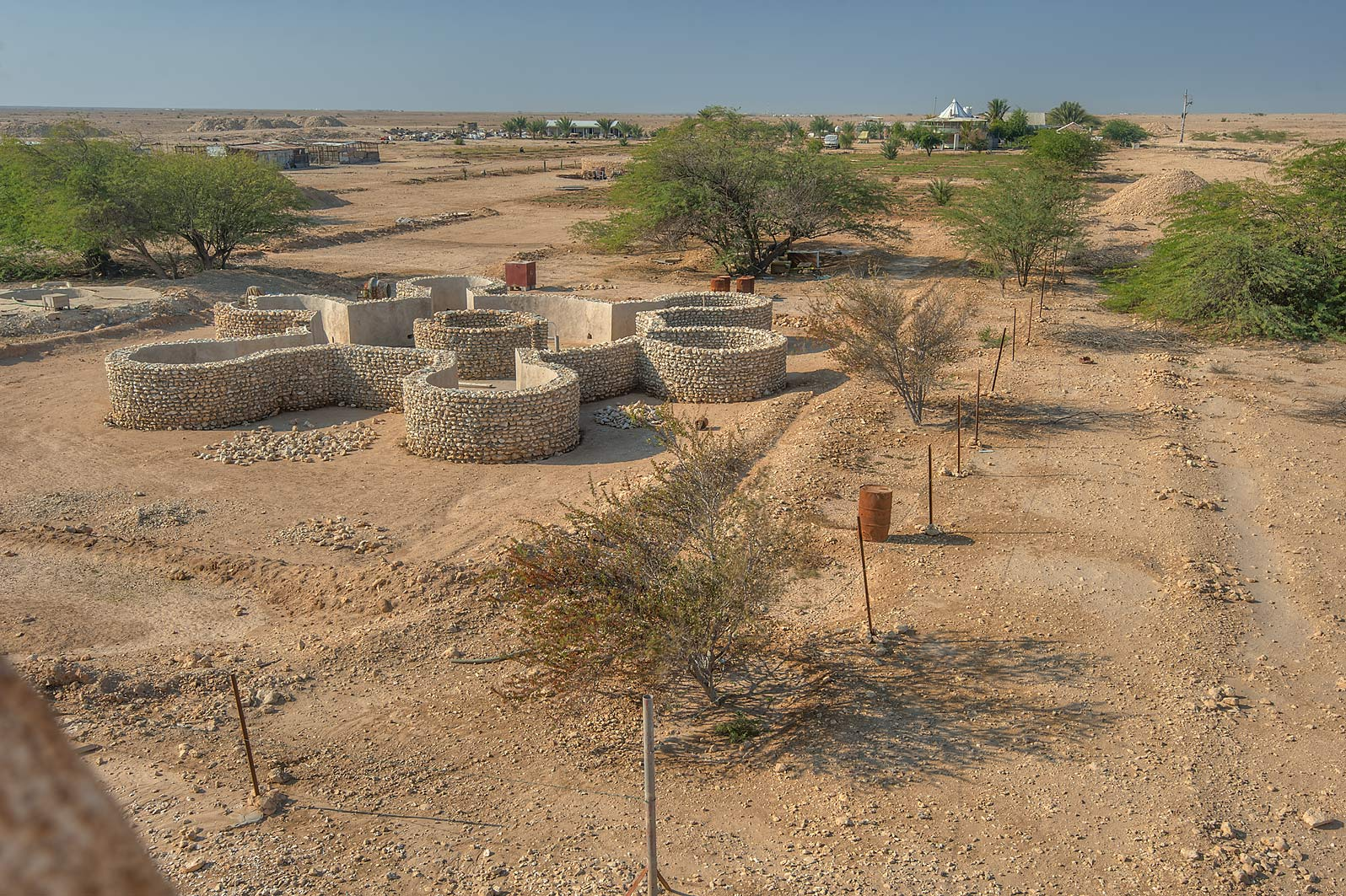
Farmland in Ath Thaqab.

=== Industry ===
Al Shamal Industrial Area is the region's industrial hub. The municipality's long-term development plan suggests that the area will cater to light and medium industries such as manufacturing, construction and logistics, benefiting both Ar Ru'ays Port and the urban development of its principal towns.

=== Agriculture ===
Around 14 sizable farming regions exist in the municipality, in the settlements of Ain Al Nuaman, Murwab, Zubarah, Lisha, Al `Arish, Ath Thaqab, Ar Ru'ays, Abu Dhalouf and Al Jumail in the west, and Al Mafjar, Athba Al Shamaliyya, Ain Sinan, Madinat Al Kaaban, and Al Jethay in the east.

In 2010, the municipality recorded 115 farms spanning its area while the Ministry of Municipality & Urban Planning documented 125 farms, constituting about 12% of all of Qatar's farms at that time. Most of the farms were based in the eastern section, with Madinat Al Kaaban having the highest concentration.

Qatar's inaugural privately owned large-scale fishing project was launched in the Al Shamal Industrial Area in October 2017. Up to 2,000 tonnes of fish will be supplied every year for domestic consumption by the fish farm.

== Sports ==
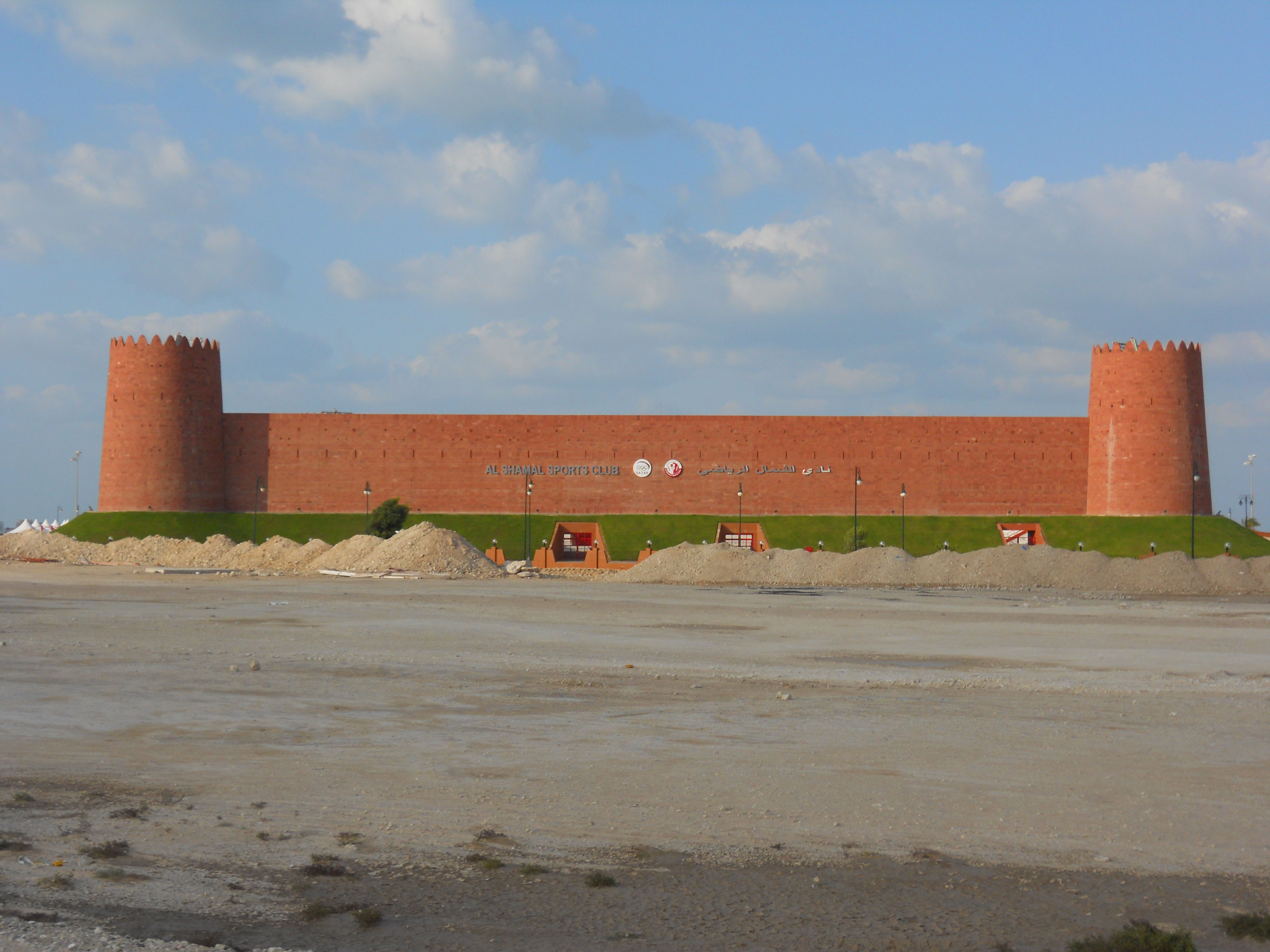
Outside view of Al-Shamal SC Stadium.

Al-Shamal SC, a sports club most notable for its football team which competes in the Qatargas League, is situated in the city. Their home games are played at Al-Shamal SC Stadium in Madinat ash Shamal.

Al-Shamal Stadium was a proposed 45,120 capacity multi-purpose stadium to be built for the 2022 FIFA World Cup and was set to host group stage matches. It was one of five proposed 2022 World Cup stadiums which were never built. The biggest factor in its cancellation was its massive distance of over 110 kilometres (68 mi) from Doha, where the majority of other World Cup stadiums and accommodations were located. Furthermore, the indefinite postponement of the proposed Qatar–Bahrain Causeway and the suspension of ties between Qatar and Bahrain in 2017 also contributed to its cancellation.

== Visitor attractions ==
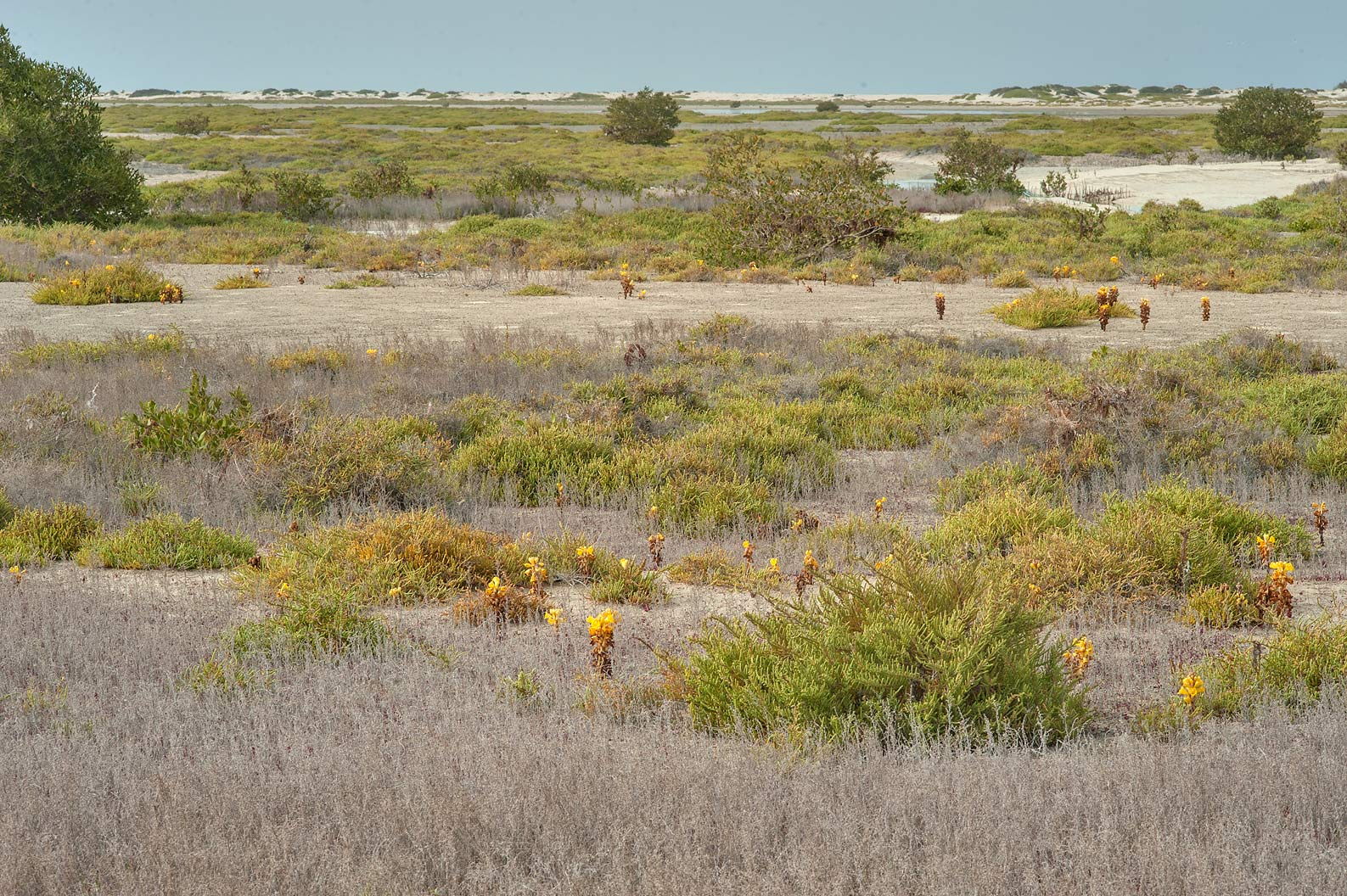
Salt marshes in Umm Tais.

The Qatar Tourism Authority (QTA) is in the process of developing Al Shamal's historic villages, archaeological sites and natural areas into tourist attractions. As the municipality currently has the highest annual precipitation rate in the country and a large coastline area, the QTA has prioritized the establishment of eco-reserves in certain areas. Islands such as Ras Rakan and Umm Tais have been developed as nature reserves in order to boost eco-tourism.

The Al Reem Biosphere Reserve is a protected area in western Al Shamal measuring 1,189 km^{2} (459 sq mi). This area encompasses the archaeological site of Zubarah and the Al Ishriq Wildlife Breeding Center. Several reintroduced species are found in this area such as sand gazelles and ostriches, in addition to native species such as dugongs, spiny-tailed lizards and red foxes.

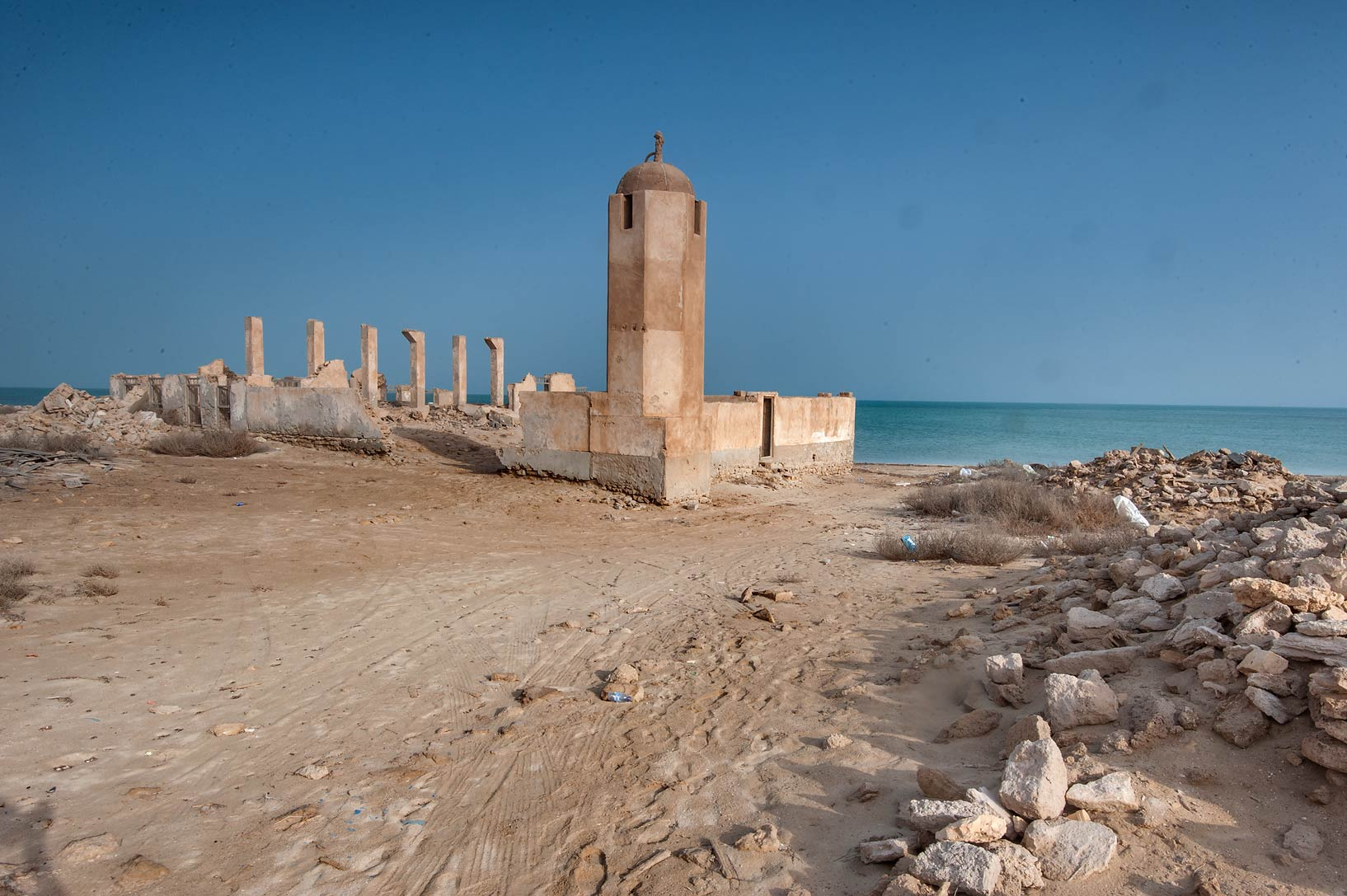
A ruined mosque in Al Khuwayr.

Ar Ru'ays' coastal area is a popular destination due to its lush vegetation. In recent years, the Ministry of Municipality and Environment have embarked on campaigns to restore the mangroves that grow abundantly on its coast. Also located along the coast of Ar Ru'ays is the Al Shamal Corniche, a seafront promenade with a length of 2,570 m (8,430 ft). In 2017 it was announced that Qatar's largest health resort, due to cover 250,000 m^{2} (2,700,000 sq ft), will be built in Khasooma, east of Ar Ru'ays.

Abandoned villages are being restored and converted into tourist attractions. Jumail, a fishing village abandoned in the 1970s and located 5 km (3.1 mi) away from Ar Ru'ays, is one example. After being partially reconstructed in 2009, the government announced its plans in late 2015 to convert the village into a museum. Containing no less than 60 crumbled structure, Jumail is thought to date back to the 19th century and had a close connection to Ruwayda, another ruined village situated 1 km (0.62 mi) away which accommodates the remains of what is possibly the largest fort in Qatar.

According to statistics made available by the Ministry of Municipality and Environment, the municipality was said to accommodate 5 parks in 2018.

=== Forts ===
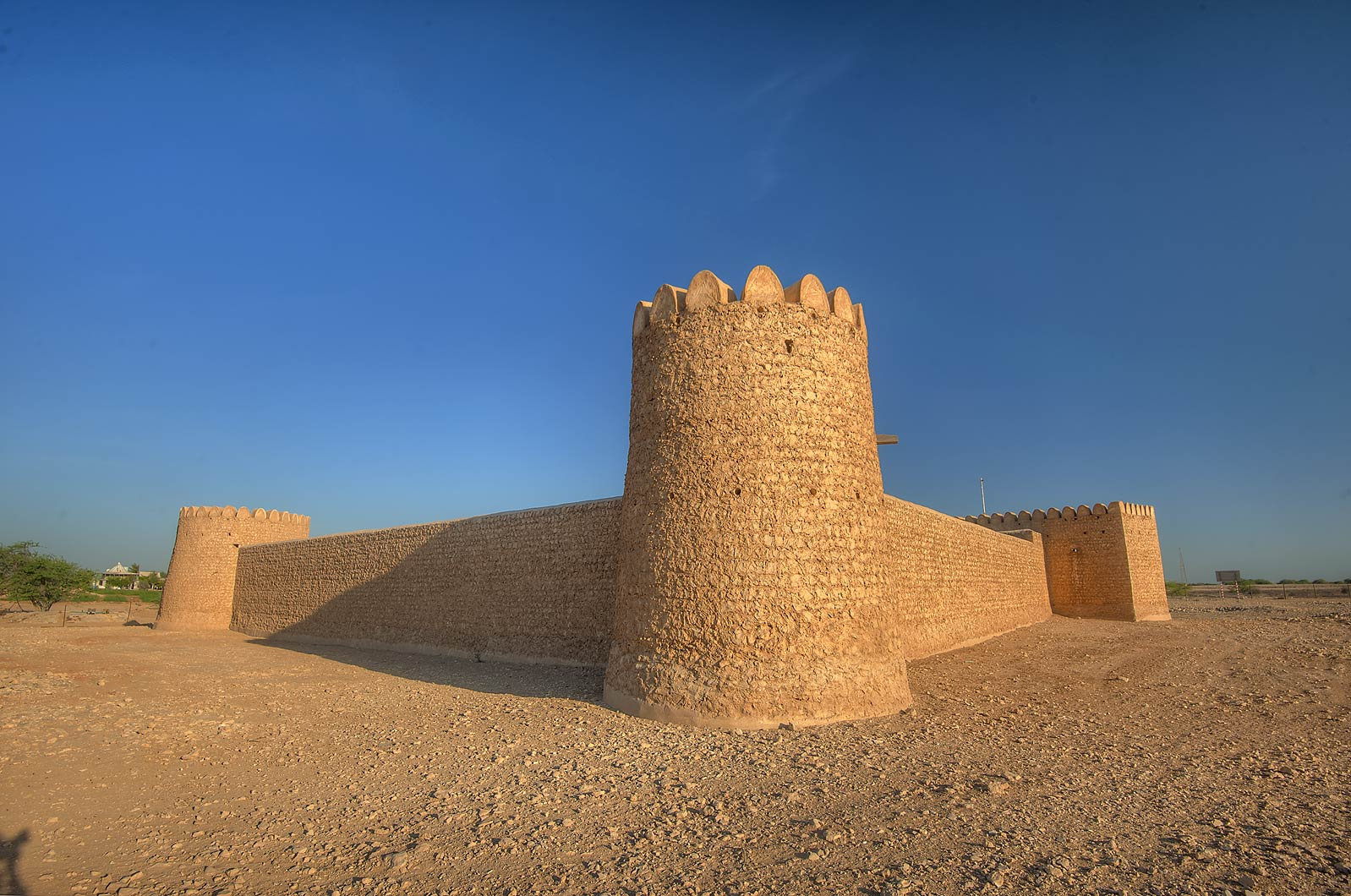
Ath Thaqab Fort, outside view.

As a result of the gradual urbanization of the various nomadic Qatari tribes in Al Shamal's past, numerous historic forts are found throughout the municipality. Many of these forts were built to protect scarce water resources, while others were to protect from invasions by neighboring tribes. Most prominent is the historic Zubarah Fort, built in 1938 and converted to a museum in 1987. This fort was built as a coast guard station and is now the center of the Zubarah archaeological site. A short distance away from Zubarah Fort is Qal'at Murair, which was built to defend Zubarah's inland wells.

The multi-purpose Ar Rakiyat Fort is approximately 8 km (5.0 mi) northeast of Zubarah Fort. It was constructed around the 19th century to protect the water supply of Ar Rakiyat and to fend off invasions, and was restored by Qatar Museums in 1988. An older fort is found 2 km (1.2 mi) away from Ar Rakiyat, near the abandoned village of Ath Thaqab. Like most other Qatari forts, Ath Thaqab fort is rectangular in shape and has four main towers. It dates to somewhere between the 17th and 19th centuries.

Umm Al Maa Fort, also near Zubarah, dates to the 19th century and only its base structure has been preserved. Similarly, Yusufiya Fort is dated to the 19th century and has only retained its base structure. Artifacts dating to the 13th century have been discovered at this fort.

=== Archaeological sites ===
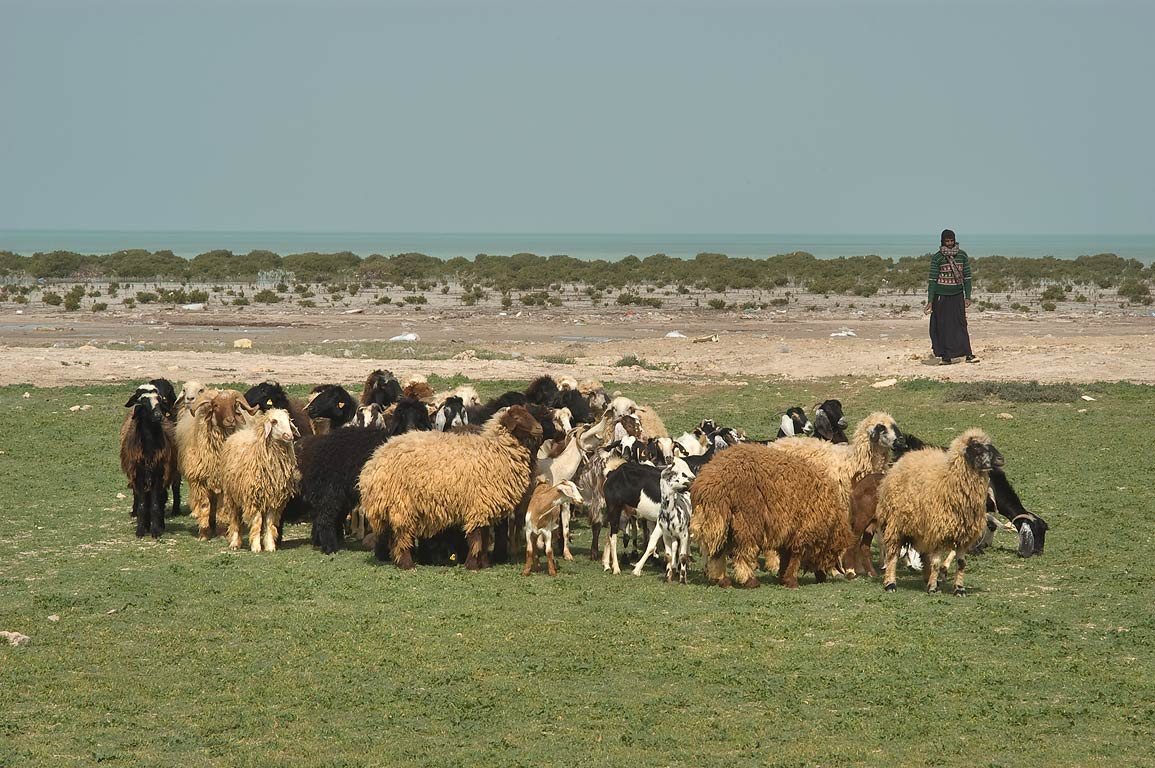
Bedouin grazing his sheep near Ruwayda archaeological site.

A cluster of Abbasid-period (750–1253) archaeological sites are found near the north-west coast and include Ar Rakiyat, Umm Al Kilab, Ghaf Makin, Mussaykah, Murwab, and Al-Haddiyah. Structures that were excavated at these sites were roughly aligned with Mecca. All of the sites are situated next to depressions, ensuring a reliable water supply.

== Demographics ==
Historical population
Year	Pop.	±%
1986	4,380	—
1997	4,059	−7.3%
2004	4,915	+21.1%
2010	7,975	+62.3%
2015	8,794	+10.3%
c-census; e-estimate

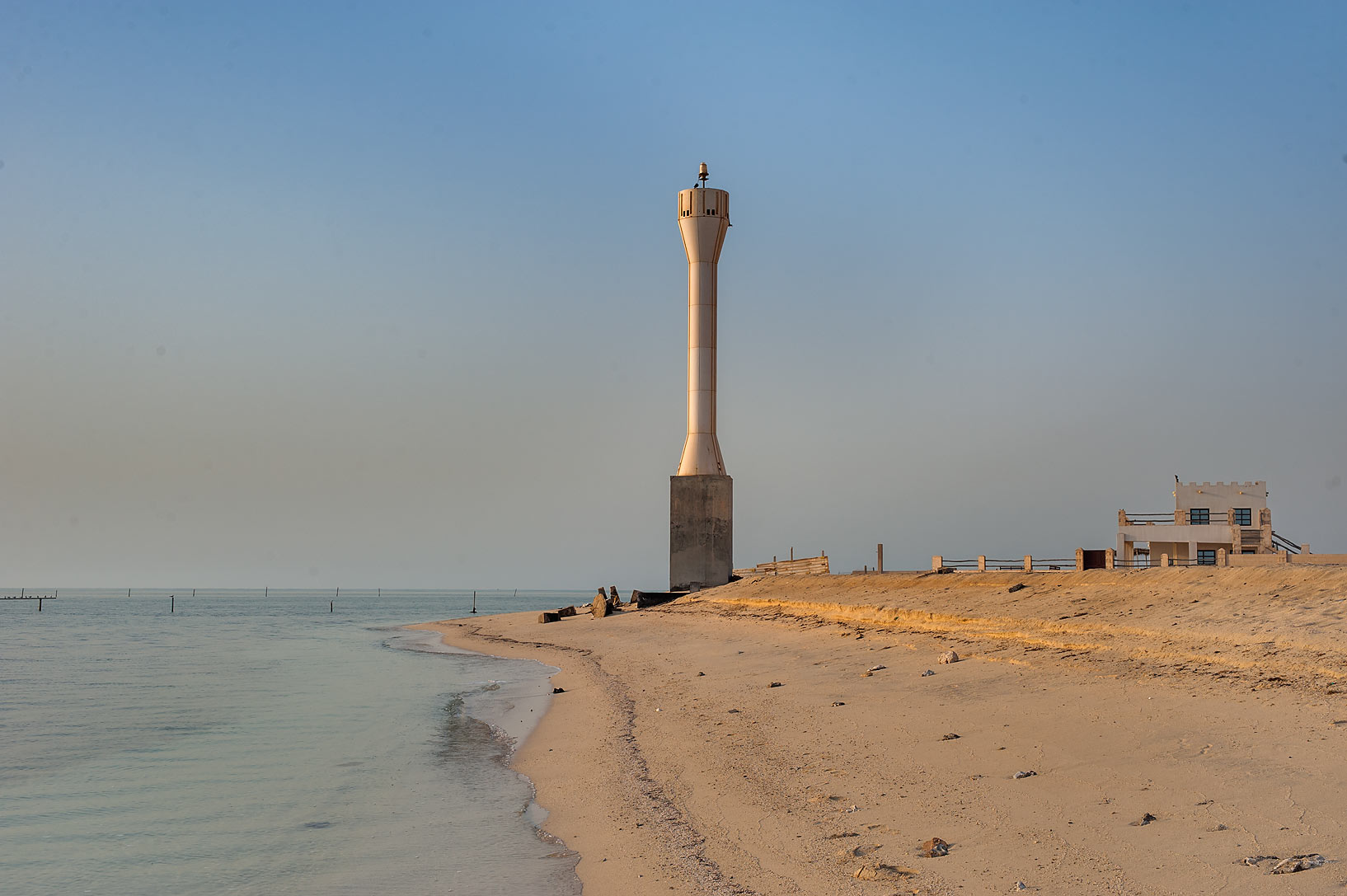
Ra's Umm Hasah Lighthouse on Al Ghariyah's coastline.

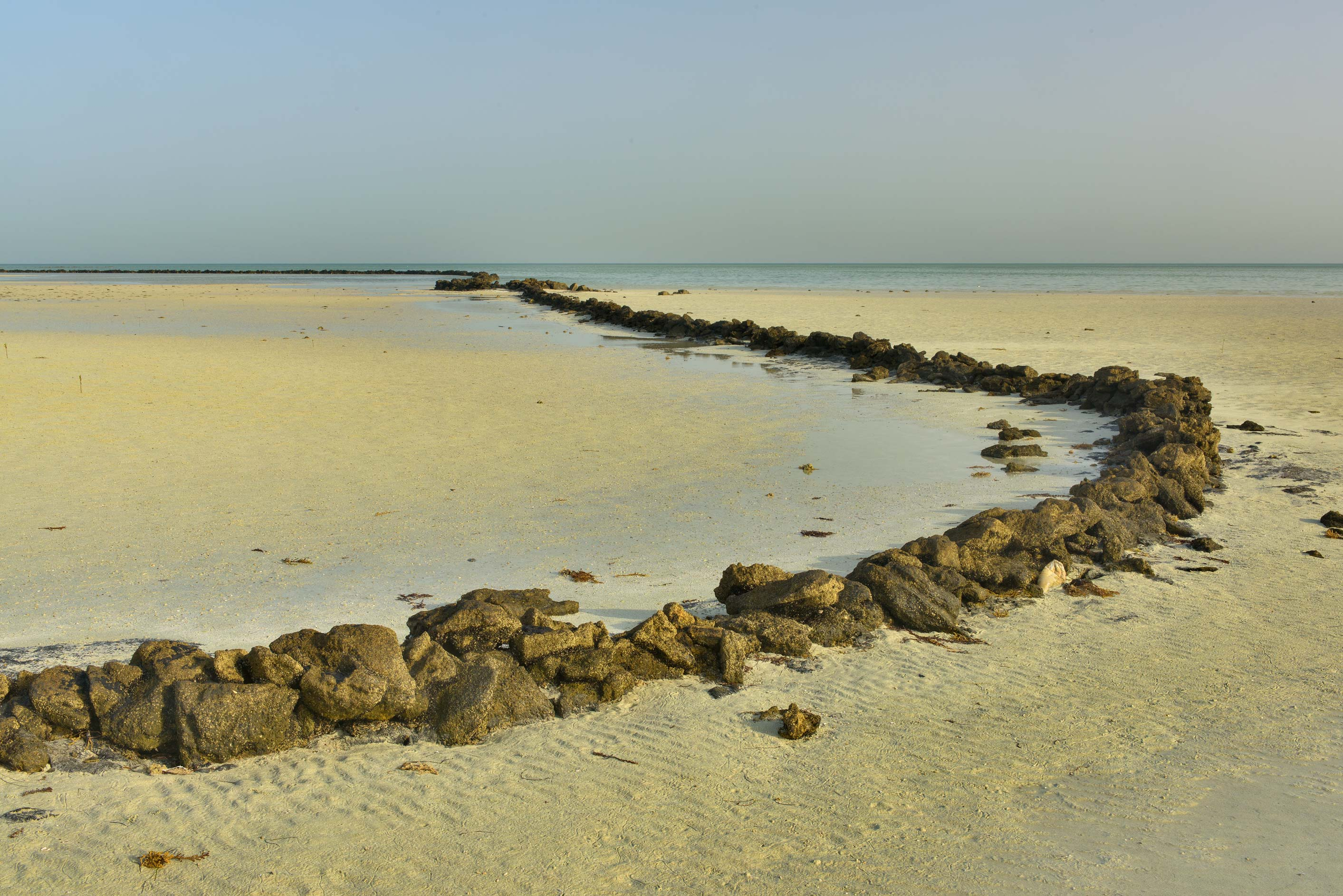
Fish traps at Al `Arish.

The following table is a breakdown of registered live births by nationality and sex for Al Shamal. Places of birth are based on the home municipality of the mother at birth.

Registered live births by nationality and sex
Year	Qatari			Non-Qatari			Total		
Year	M	F	Total	M	F	Total	M	F	Total
1984	27	27	54	18	25	43	45	52	97
1985	38	31	69	23	21	44	61	52	113
1986	21	21	42	24	18	42	45	39	84
1987	20	27	47	21	20	41	41	47	88
1988	27	25	52	25	14	39	52	39	91
1989	37	32	69	23	22	45	60	54	114
1990	21	26	47	20	17	37	41	43	84
1991	30	32	62	18	17	35	48	49	97
1992	27	40	67	14	26	40	41	66	107
1993	29	29	58	19	16	35	48	45	93
1994	N/A								
1995	24	28	52	17	14	31	41	42	83
1996	30	33	63	16	8	24	46	41	87
1997	21	27	48	19	12	31	40	39	79
1998	34	29	63	12	9	21	46	38	84
1999	38	34	72	15	7	22	53	41	94
2000	29	34	63	9	9	18	38	43	81
2001	19	32	51	9	12	21	28	44	72
2002	27	30	57	11	16	27	38	46	84
2003	29	37	66	17	18	35	46	55	101
2004	7	8	15	3	4	7	10	12	22
2005	36	47	83	14	12	26	50	59	109
2006	46	33	79	19	15	34	65	48	113
2007	36	42	78	18	19	37	54	61	115
2008	29	26	55	23	29	52	52	55	107
2009	26	31	57	9	15	24	35	46	81
