= Zone 77, Qatar =

Zone 77
- Zone
- Interactive map of Zone 77
- Coordinates: 25.964633°N 51.331263°E
- Country: Qatar
- Municipality: Al Shamal
- Blocks: 31

Area
  - Total: 266 km^{2} (103 sq mi)

Population
  - Total: 1,727 (2,015)
- Time zone: UTC+03 (Arabia Standard Time)
- ISO 3166 code: QA-MS

Zone 77 is a zone of the municipality of Al Shamal in the state of Qatar. The main districts recorded in the 2015 population census were Ain Sinan, Fuwayrit and Madinat Al Kaaban, all of which are situated in the eastern section of the municipality.

Other districts which fall within its administrative boundaries are Al Ghashamiya, Al Huwaila, Al Marroona, Jebel Jassassiyeh, Lejthaya, Umm Al Ghaylam, and Zarqa.

== Demographics ==
Year	Population
1986	964
1997	484
2004	558
2010	771
2015	1,727

== Land use ==
The Ministry of Municipality and Environment (MME) breaks down land use in the zone as follows.

Area (km^{2})	Developed land (km^{2})	Undeveloped land (km^{2})	Residential (km^{2})	Commercial/ Industrial (km^{2})	Education/ Health (km^{2})	Farming/ Green areas (km^{2})	Other uses (km^{2})
266.02	17.03	248.99	1.52	0.09	0.01	14.26	1.15
