= Ain Sinan =

Ain Sinan عين سنان
- Village
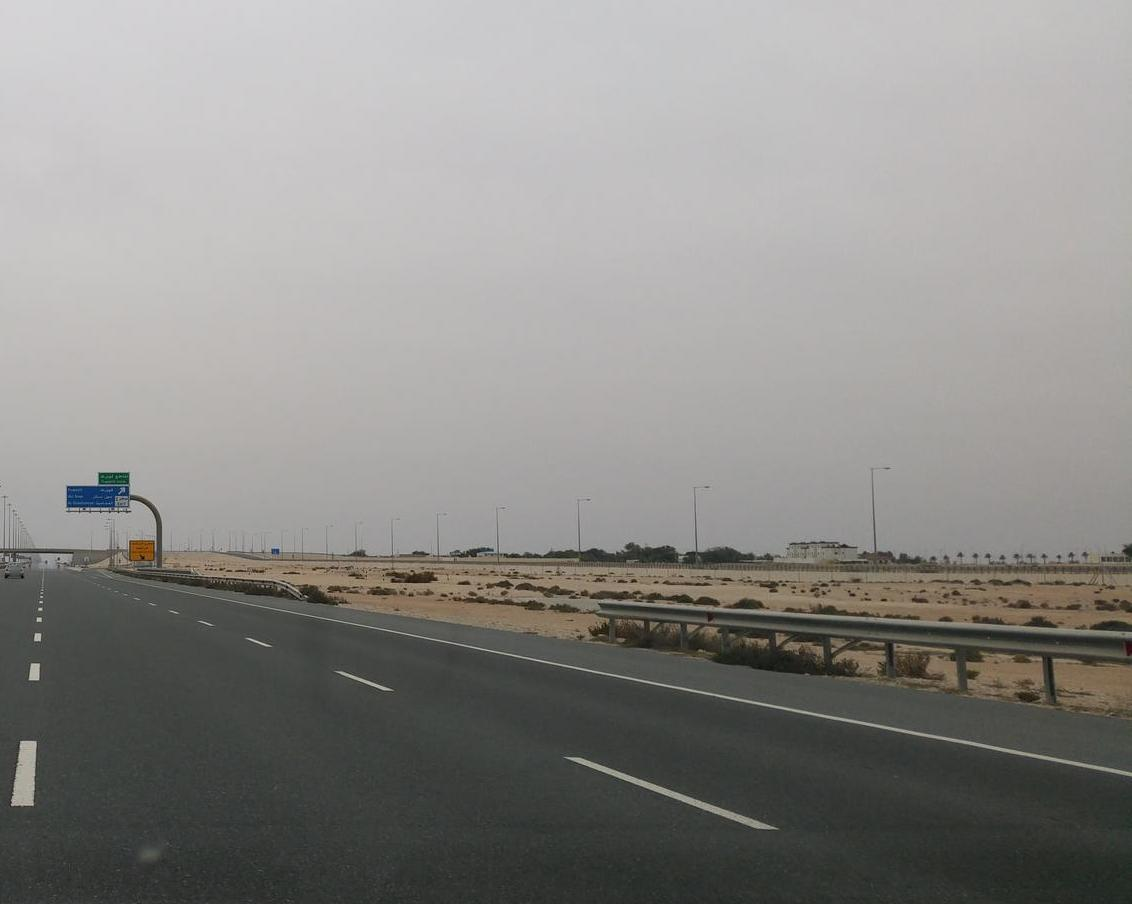
- View of Ain Sinan off Al Shamal Road

- Ain Sinan
- Coordinates: 26°01′00″N 51°20′00″E
- Country: Qatar
- Municipality: Al Shamal
- Zone: Zone 77
- District no.: 366

Area
  - Total: 3.5 km^{2} (1.4 sq mi)

Ain Sinan (Arabic: عين سنان, romanized: ‘Ayn Sinān) is a village on the northern coast of Qatar, in the municipality of Al Shamal. Historically, the village has been mainly inhabited by the Al-Rashed tribe.

== Etymology ==
The first part of the name, ʿayn refers to a naturally occurring water spring at the ground surface, and is defined in the Arabic dictionary Lisān al-ʿArab as "a source of running underground water". The second component, Sinan, is the name of the individual credited with constructing a well in the area. The village derives its name from this well, which once served as a vital water source for the region.

== History ==
According to oral tradition, Ain Sinan is the ancestral homeland of the Al Rashid tribe.

In J. G. Lorimer's Gazetteer of the Persian Gulf, Ain Sinan was described as a village 4 miles (6.4 km) southwest of Fuwayrit which contained a fort with a 35 feet (11 m) deep masonry well. The fort was said to have been built by the Al-Maadeed tribe. After the Al Maadeed abandoned the area, the fort was held by the Bu Kuwara tribe of Fuwayrit as a means to secure its water supply.

The village was demarcated in 1992.

== Geography ==
Ain Sinan is situated near the north-eastern tip of Qatar, about 70 km (43 mi) away from the capital Doha. The village of Al Zarqaa is nearby.

In the past, villages situated directly on the coast such as Al Ghariyah and Fuwayrit experienced water shortages because seawater prevented direct access to the groundwater. Additionally, the water that could be obtained was of poor quality. Therefore, Ain Sinan would establish a trade relationship with these villages in which it would receive sea goods such as fish and pearls in exchange for its potable water.

== Infrastructure ==
The nearest health center is 15 km (9.3 mi) away in Madinat Al Kaaban. There is no secondary school in the village; high school students typically commute to Madinat ash Shamal, 25 km (16 mi) away.

Ain Sinan Park was opened in 2013, and covers an area of 5,152 m^{2} (55,460 sq ft). It has a children's play area, a cafeteria, and features 15 different species of trees and shrubs.

Ain Sinan Mosque was built in 1940 and is considered a local historic landmark and has undergone renovation by Qatar Museums.
