= Yoghbi =

Yoghbi اليغبي
- Abandoned village
- Location in Qatar
- Coordinates: 25.850099°N 51.001824°E
- Country: Qatar
- Municipality: Al Shamal

Yoghbi (Arabic: اليغبي) is an abandoned village in north-west Qatar located in the municipality of Al Shamal. It accommodates the earliest yet-discovered Islamic-era settlement on the Qatar Peninsula.

It is about 3 kilometres (1.9 mi) to the north of Umm Al Maa and 2 kilometres (1.2 mi) to the southwest of Murwab, two other historic Islamic-period sites.

== Etymology ==
In Arabic, yaghbi is a term that roughly translates to "inconspicuous". This name was derived from its low elevation and partial concealment by stands of trees.

== Geography ==
Yoghbi is in the hinterland of Zubarah and is near to Al Haddayah and Umm Al Maa. The site is situated in a rawda (depression). Large clusters of still-active wells are found here, as well as small dam structures built to encourage the formation of reservoirs.

== Archaeology ==
In March 2019, the joint archaeological mission of Qatar Museums and the University College London Qatar (UCL-Q) discovered the oldest known settlement in Qatar dating to the Islamic period, which began in c. 628 CE. The settlement discovered here is thought to have been founded during the Sasanian period, between 538 and 670 CE. However, habitation continued well into the Umayyad period, with some ruins bearing features that indicate they were built sometime between 661 and 750 CE.

Jose Carvajal Lopez, the lead archaeologist for UCL-Q, stated that this finding is of some significance because it suggests that habitation of Qatar's north coast was not dependent on trade generated by the formation of Baghdad in 762 or the emergence of Siraf around 800.
