= Al Mafjar =

Al Mafjar المفجر
- Abandoned village
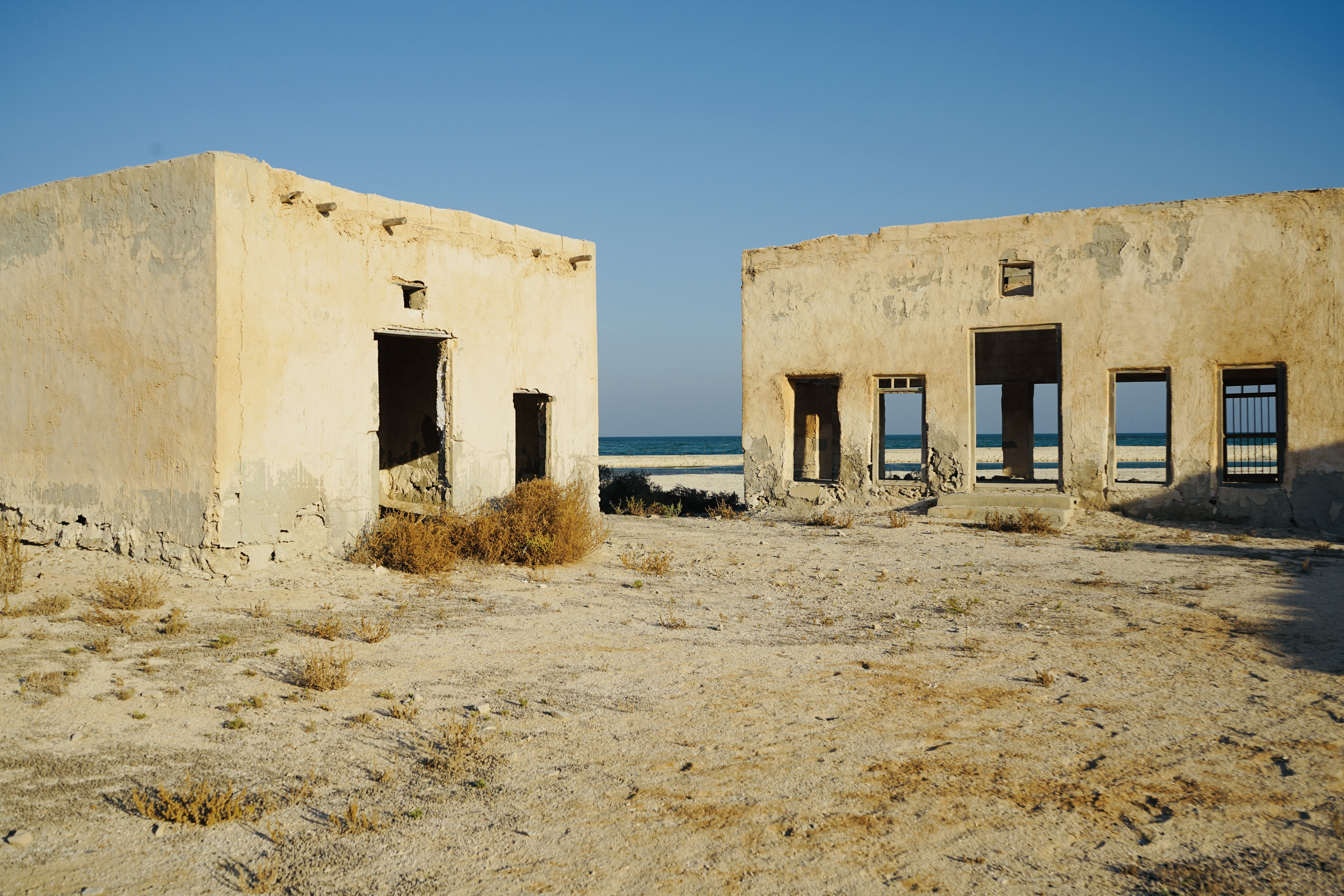
- Ruins in Al Mafjar

- Location in Qatar
- Coordinates: 26°8′0″N 51°18′1″E
- Country: Qatar
- Municipality: Ash Shamal

Al Mafjar (Arabic: المفجر) is an abandoned village in Qatar, located in the municipality of Ash Shamal in the north. There are plans to redevelop ruins of the ancient village as a tourist attraction. Umm Tais National Park and Ar Ru'ays are nearby.

== Etymology ==
In Arabic, mafjar roughly translates to "bomber". There is a high ground to the north of the village which has long prevented seawater from washing in, but when sea levels rose unexpectedly, the seawater "exploded" and spread around the village, thus giving it the name Al Mafjar.

== Geography ==
Al Mafjar is located on the eastern side of Qatar's northern coast. The line connecting Al Mafjar and Abu Dhalouf serves as a demarcation between the coastal plain areas to the north and the interior plains to the south, the latter area being characterized by a gradual widening to the south of this line.

== Gallery ==
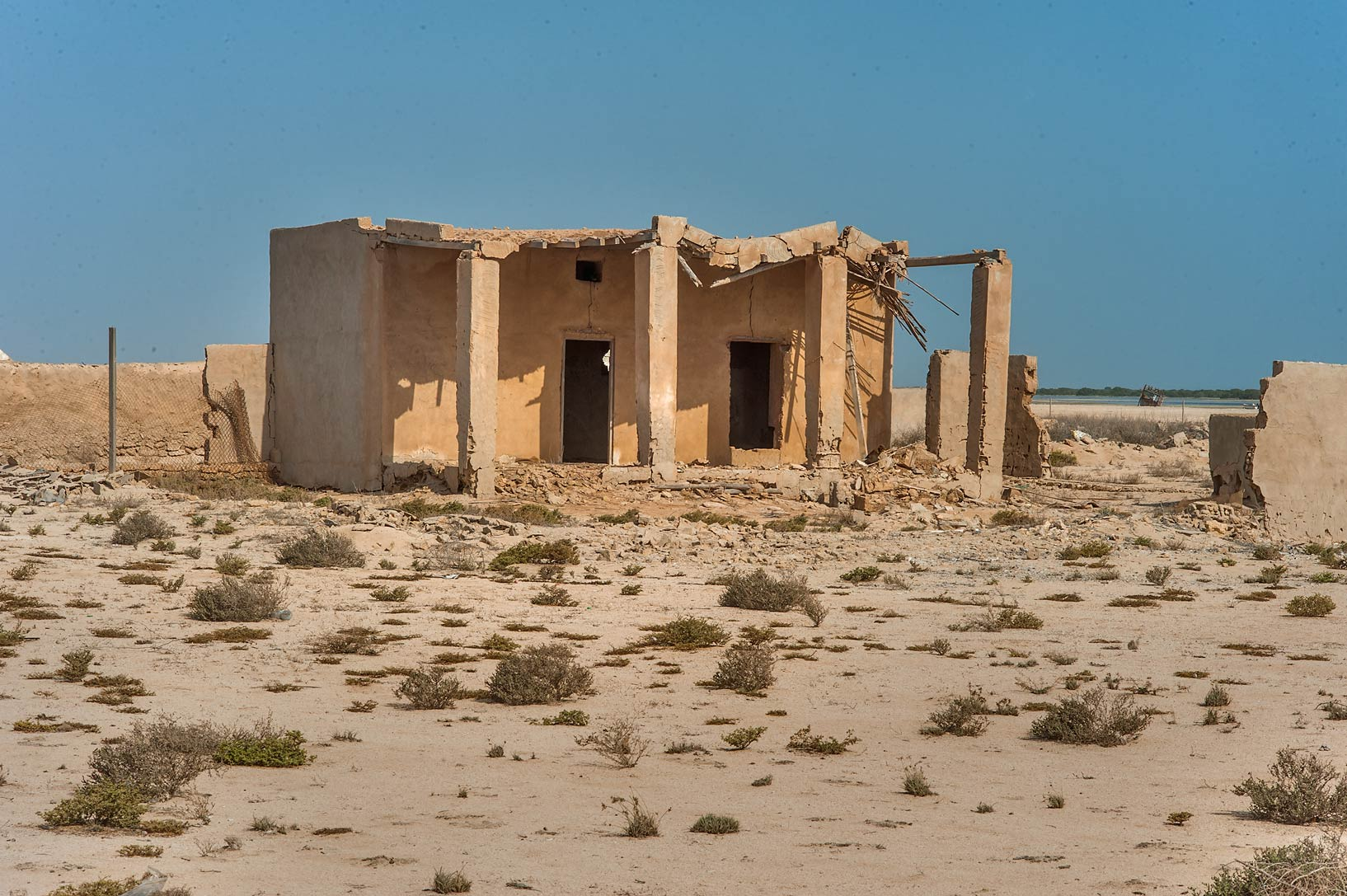
Ruined building in Al Mafjar

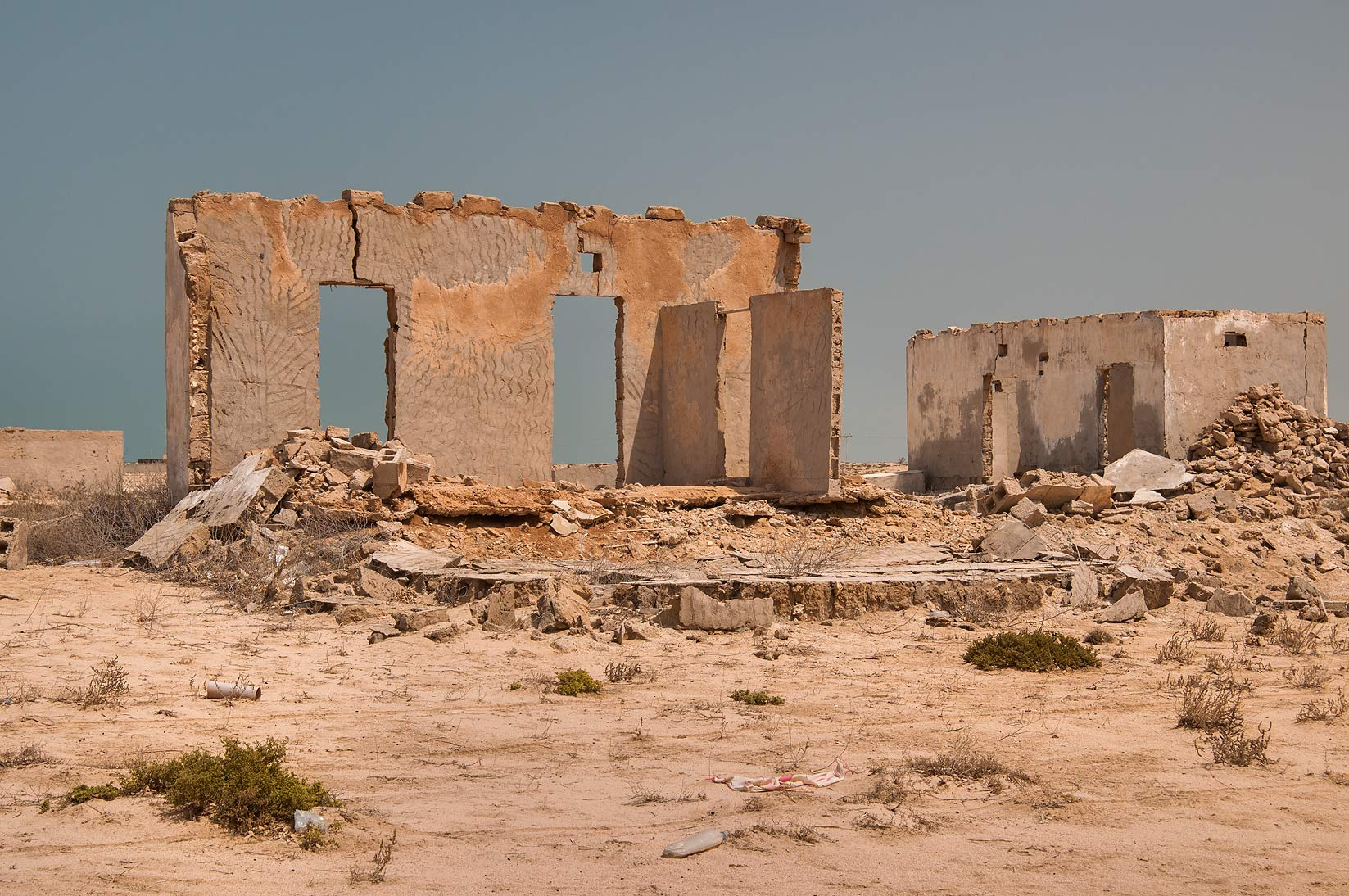
Stone wall remnants in Al Mafjar

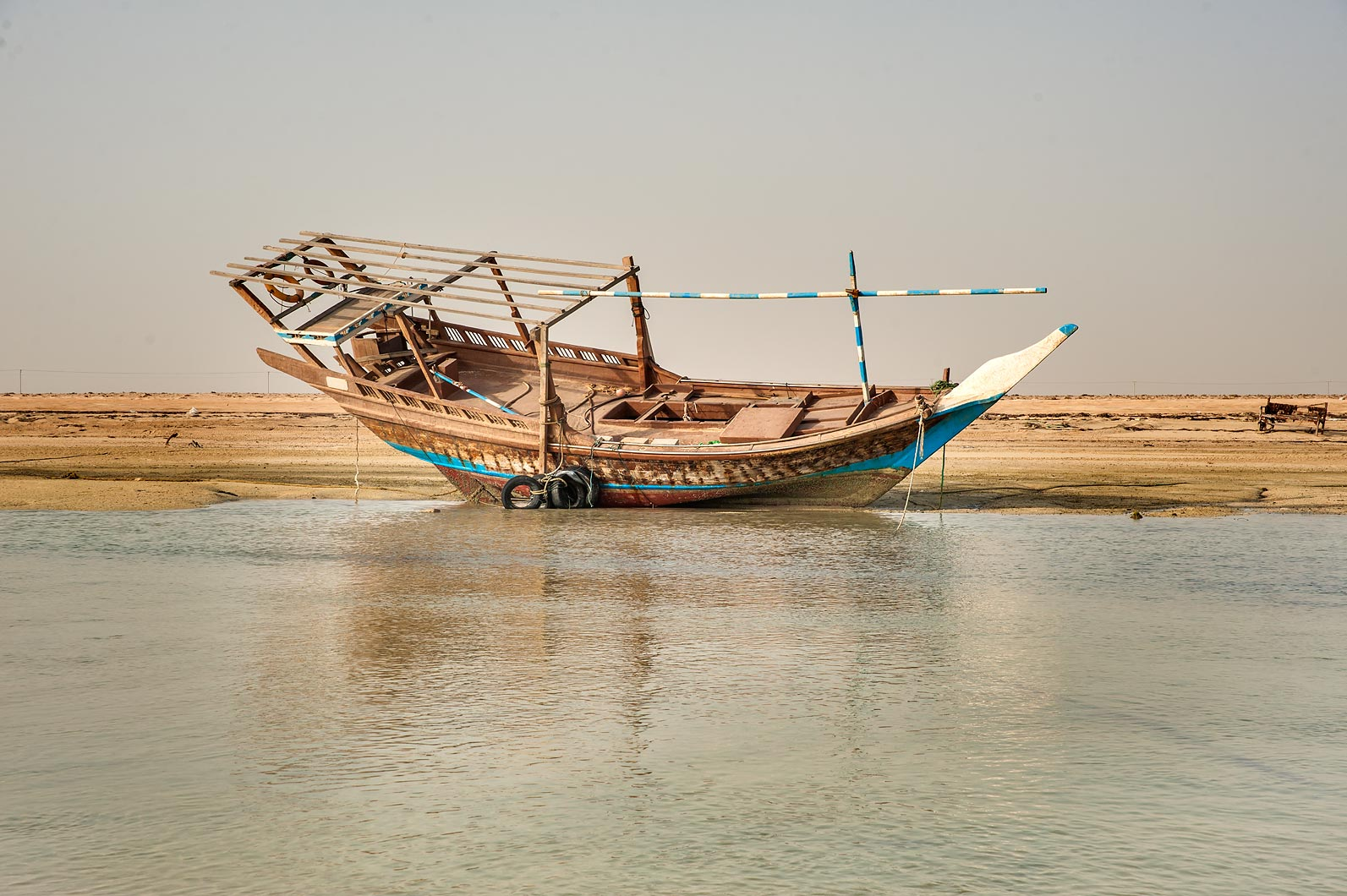
Traditional dhow on Al Mafjar beach

== See also ==
- Natural areas of Qatar
