= Al-ʽArish, Qatar =

Al-ʽArish العريش
- Abandoned village
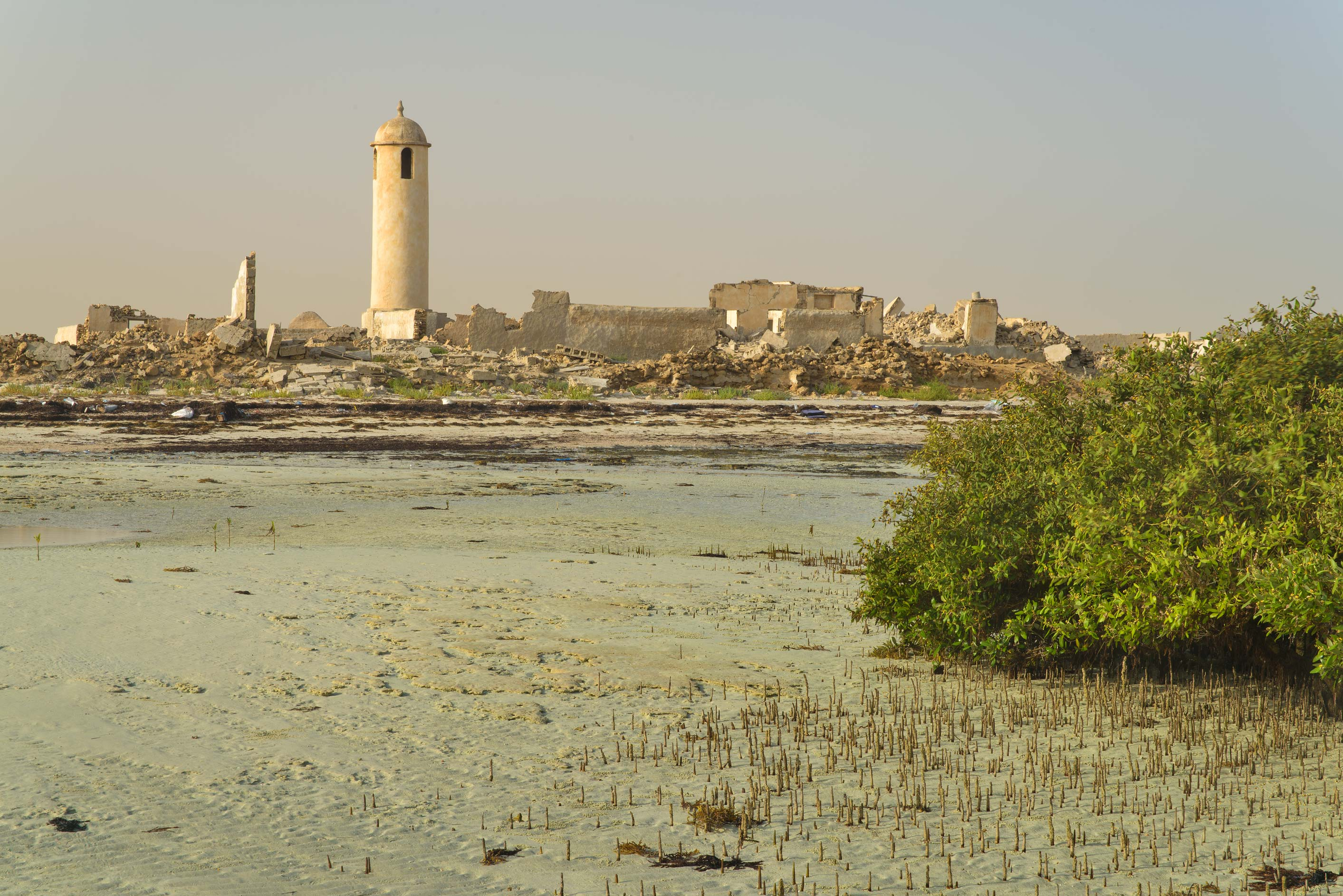

- Location in Qatar
- Coordinates: 26°3′3″N 51°3′24″E
- Country: Qatar
- Municipality: Ash Shamal
- Zone: Zone 78
- District no.: 393

Area
  - Total: 5.5 sq mi (14.2 km^{2})

Al-ʽArish (Arabic: العريش) is an abandoned village in Qatar, in the municipality of Al Shamal. It lies one mile south-west of the coastal village of Al Khuwayr.

== Etymology ==
Arish is an Arabic term that refers to "palm trees"; it was named so after palm trees growing in the area which shaded the entire village.

== History ==
Al Arish was among the villages occupied by Abdullah bin Jassim Al Thani's forces in July 1937 during the 1937 Qatari–Bahraini conflict, in which he led a military expedition against the Al Jabor faction of the Al Naim tribe of Zubarah and its supporters, whom he considered to be defectors to Bahrain.

== Geography ==
To the south-west is Sabkhat Al-Arish, a sabkha (a type of salt-flat) whose elevation is close to sea level. Due to the high level of salinity, few trees grow there.

== Power station ==
Inaugurated in 1975 with a power production capacity of 8.5 megawatts, the Al Arish Power Station was constructed to serve as an energy source for Qatar's northern area.

== Gallery ==
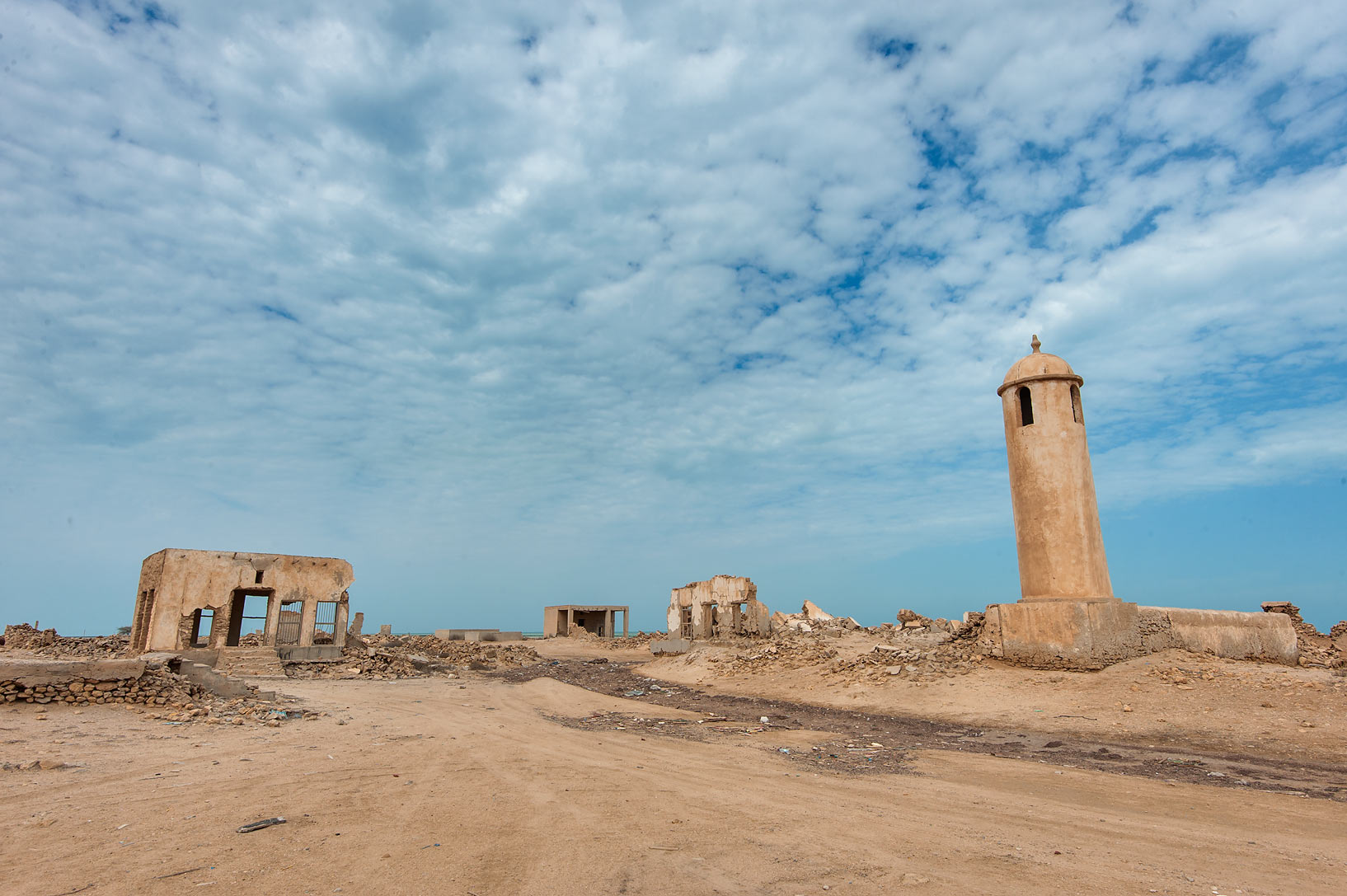
Old central square of Al Arish

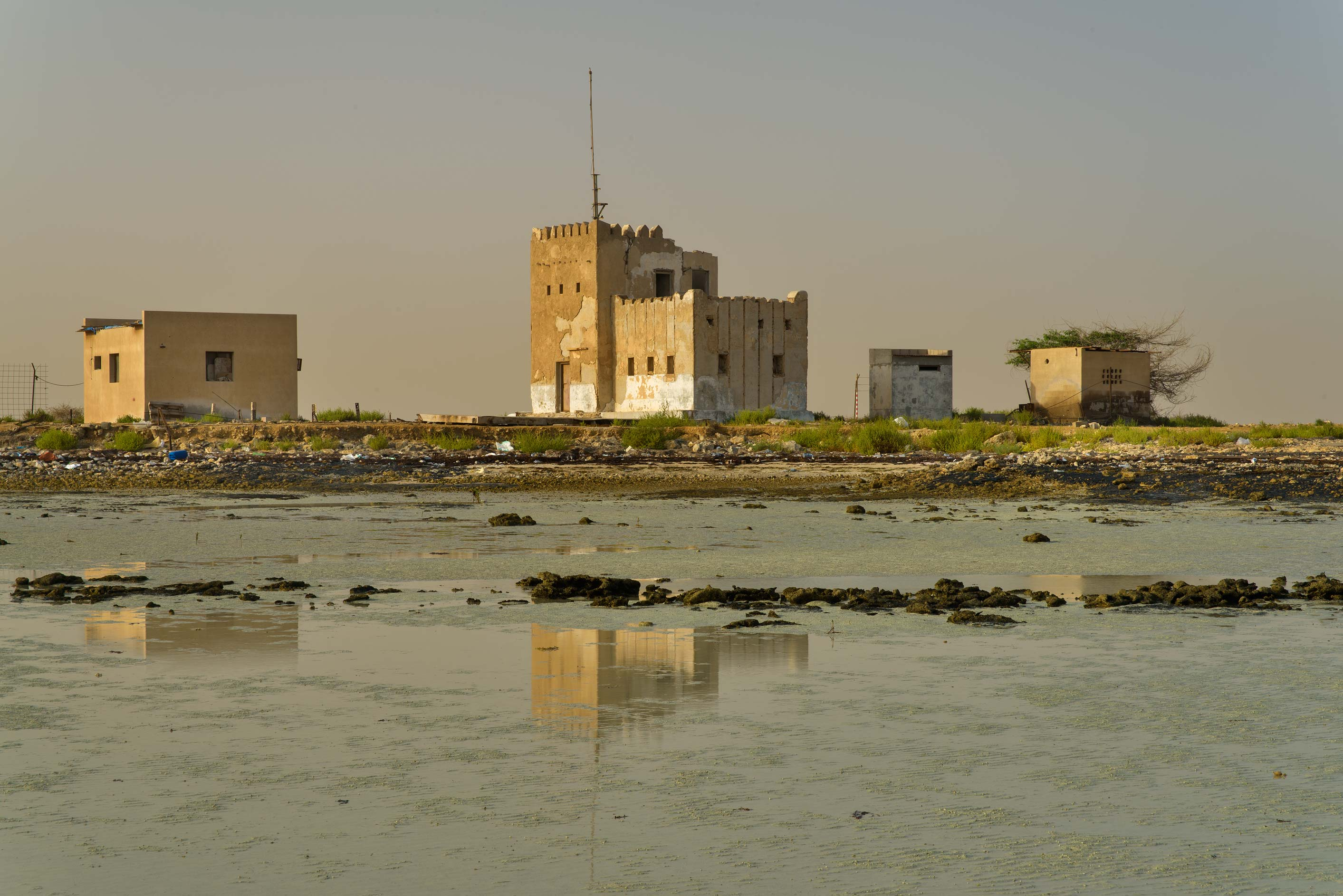
Old Al Arish Police Station

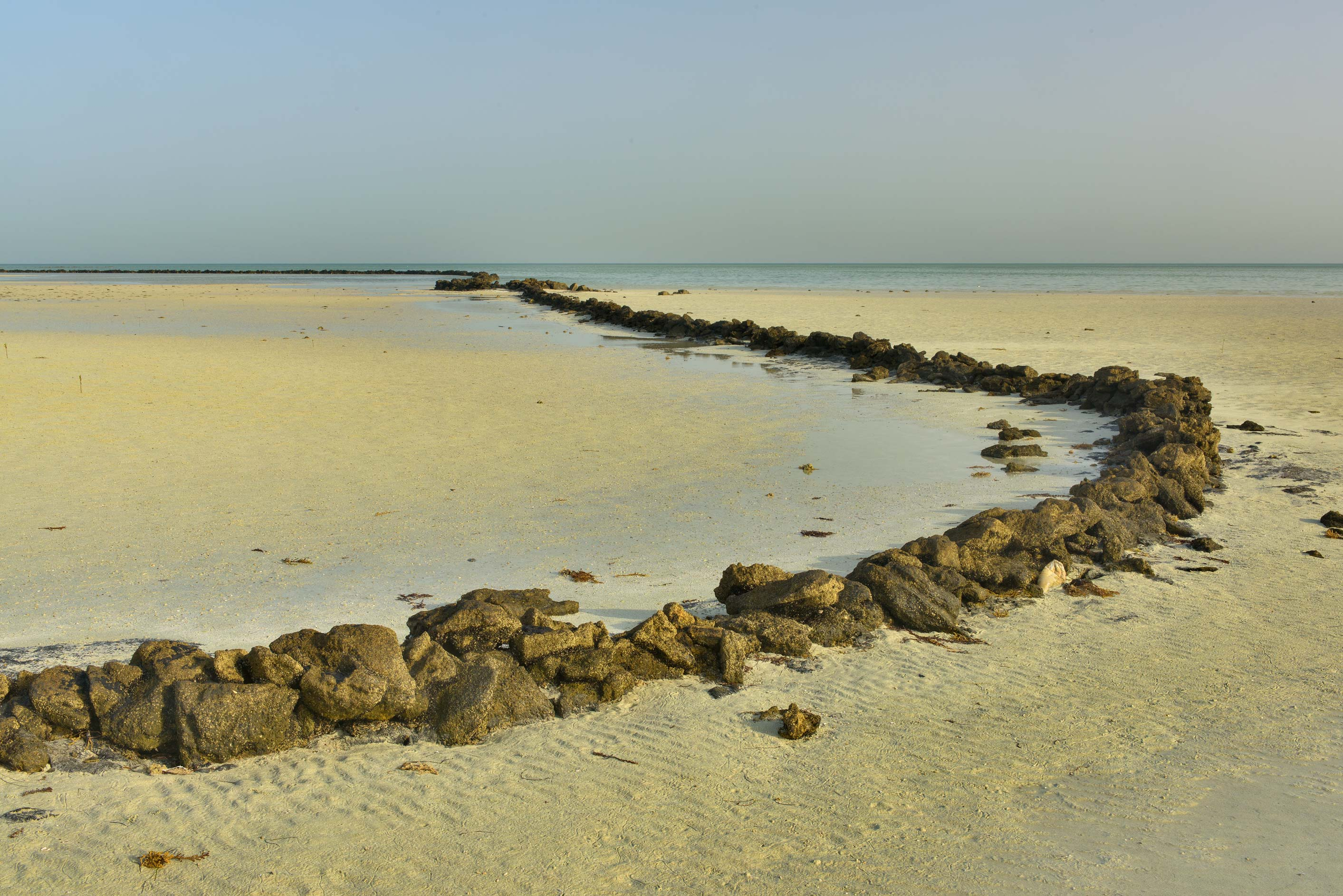
Intertidal stone fish traps at Al Arish
