= Sidriyat Makin =

Coordinates: 26°02′N 51°10′E

Sidriyat Makin (Arabic: سِدْرِيَّة مَكِين) is a settlement in Qatar, located in the municipality of Ash Shamal, about 100 kilometers north of Doha.

== Etymology ==
The 'Sidriyat' portion of the settlement's name refers to the sidra trees which grow in the area. 'Makin' is the name of a nearby settlement which it was named after.
