= Umm Tais National Park =

National park in Qatar

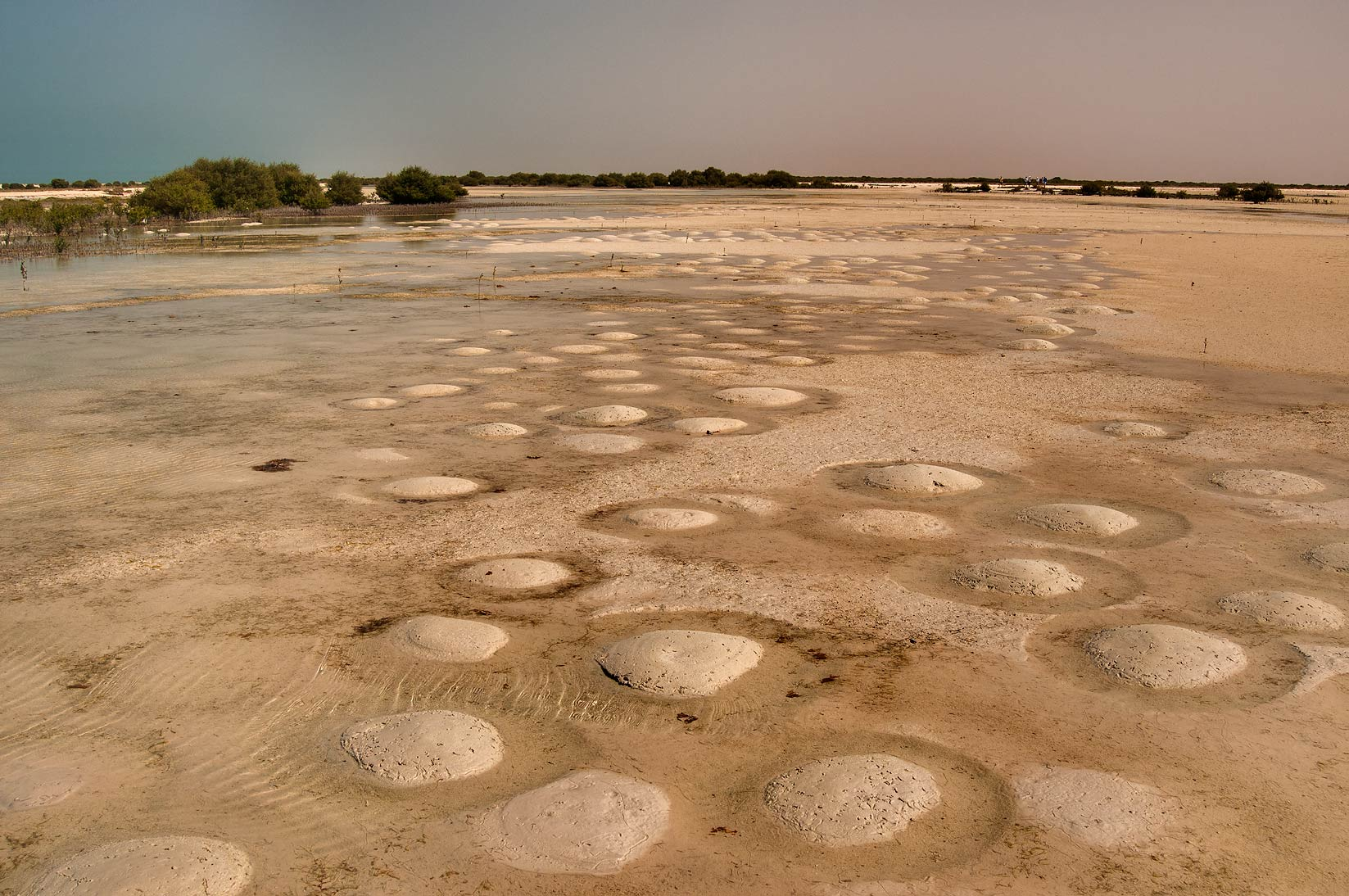
Sand mounds in a salt marsh in Umm Tais

Umm Tais National Park is on an uninhabited island on the northern tip of Qatar. It includes sand bars and small islets with mangroves. A number of migratory bird species also inhabit the island. It was established in 2006 during the 15th Asian Games. Ruins of an ancient village known as Al Mafjar are nearby and there are plans to develop it as a tourist attraction. It is also within 6.4 km (4 mi) of the town of Ar-Ruʼays.

== Wildlife ==
Umm Tais is one of the main hawksbill sea turtle nesting sites in Qatar.

== See also ==
- Natural areas of Qatar
