= Madinat Al Kaaban =

Madinat Al Kaaban مدينة الكعبان
- Village
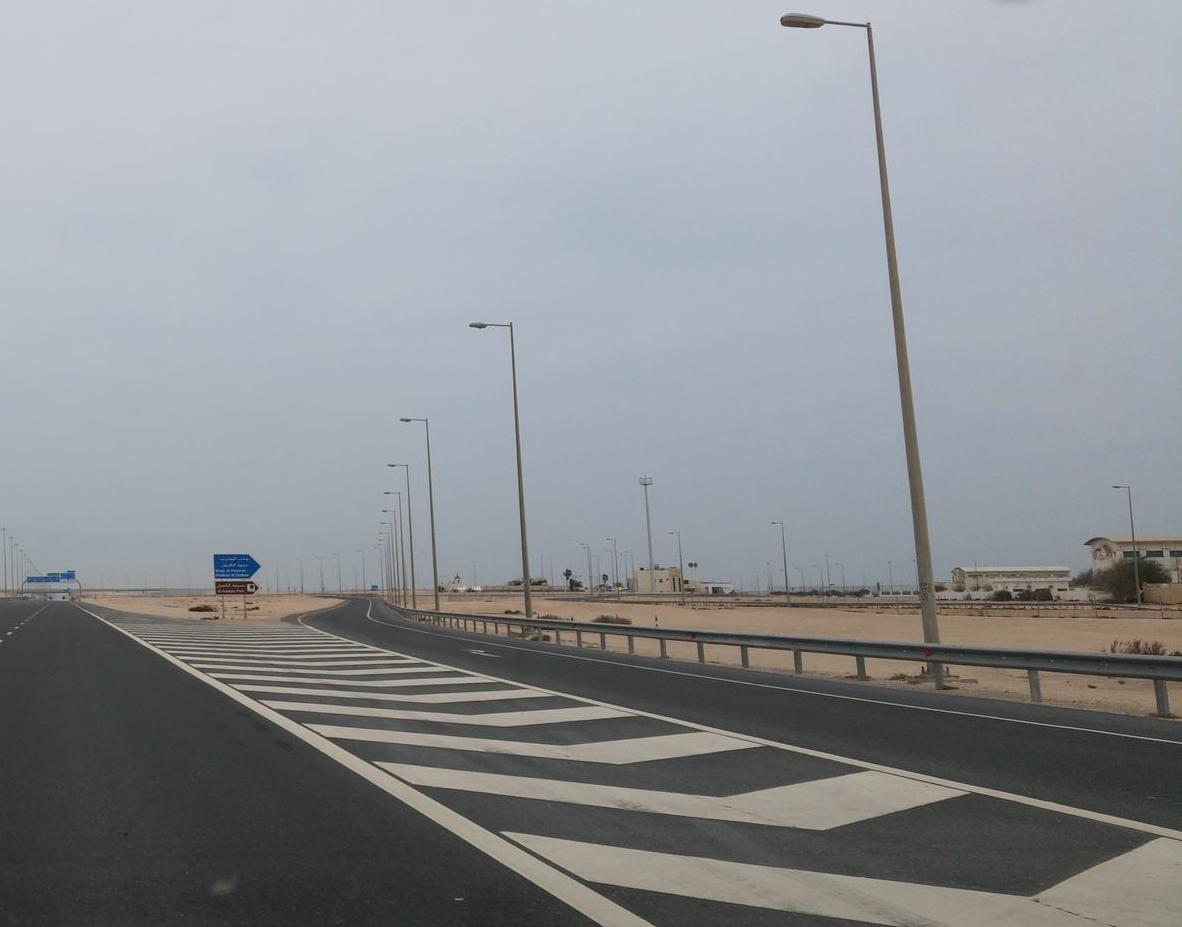
- Turn off to Madinat Al Kaaban on Al Shamal Road

- Location in Qatar
- Coordinates: 25°52′26″N 51°21′12″E
- Country: Qatar
- Municipality: Al Khor and Al Thakhira
- Zone no.: 77
- District no.: 361

Area
  - Total: 2.2 sq mi (5.6 km^{2})

Population (2021)
  - Total: 591

Madinat Al Kaaban (Arabic: مدينة الكعبان, romanized: Madīnat al Ka‘bān) is a village in Qatar, located in the municipality of Al Khor and Al Thakhira. It lies close to the border with Al Shamal Municipality.

== Etymology ==
The first component of the name, madinat, is Arabic for "city". The second part, Kaaban, refers to the Al-Kaabi tribe, who founded the village.

== Geography ==
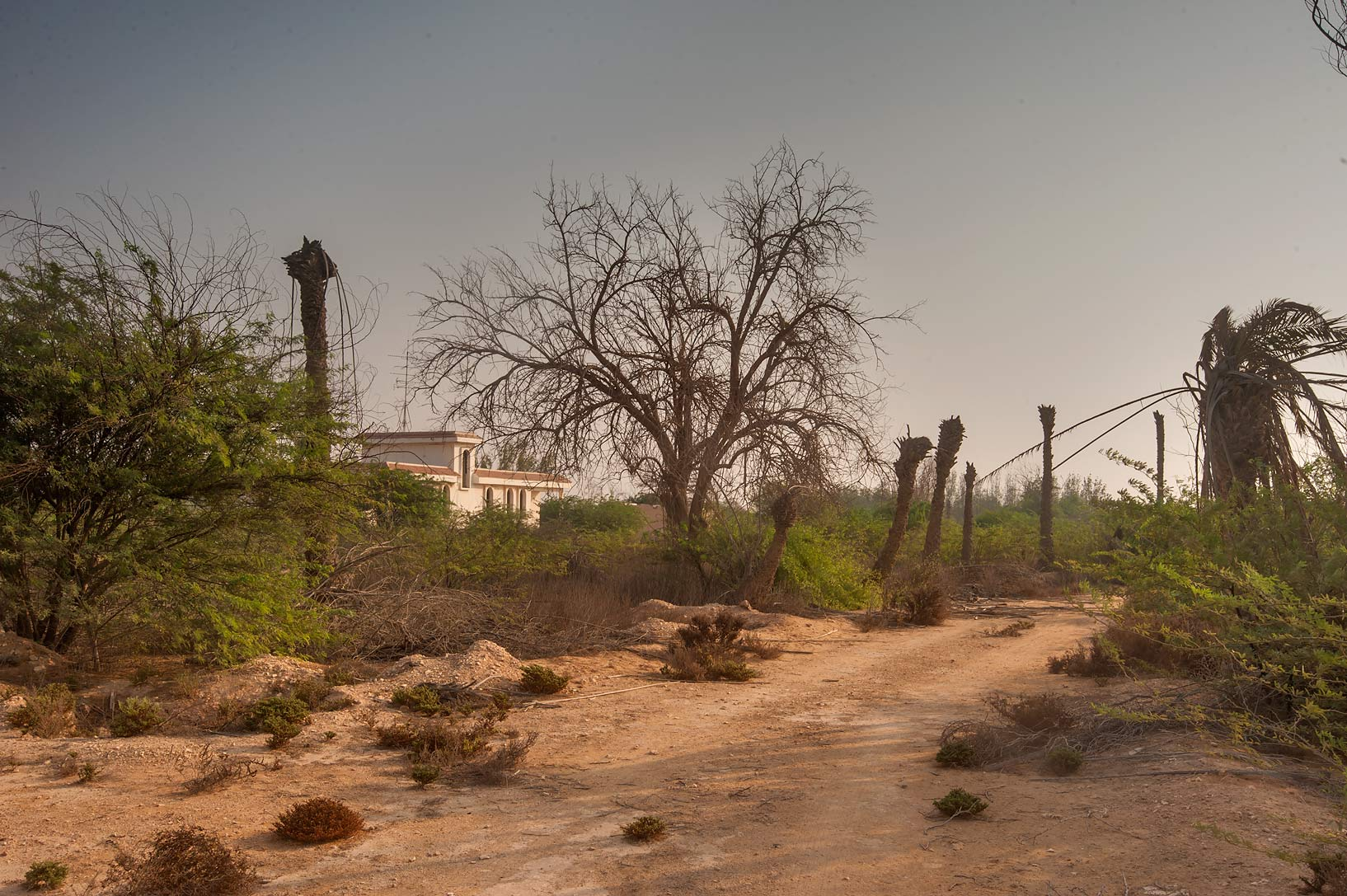
Old garden in Waab Al Mashrab, near Madinat Al Kaaban.

Madinat Al Kaaban has historically been inhabited by the Al-Kaabi tribe. To the north-east of the village is Waab Al Mashrab, a now-abandoned village. Waab Al Mashrab was likely built around the 1950s and was also mainly inhabited by the Al-Kaabi tribe, but the village was abandoned in 1976 amidst the government's efforts to resettle rural Qataris to urban areas. Some of its inhabitants moved to Madinat Al Kaaban. Now in ruins, Waab Al Mashrab has approximately 50 houses, a mosque, a school and several farms.

Qatar's capital city, Doha, is about 65 km south from the village while Madinat ash Shamal is roughly 35 km to the north-west.

== Infrastructure ==
After Qatar started to receive substantial profits from its oil extraction activities in the 1960s and 1970s, the government launched several housing projects for its citizens. As part of this initiative, 50 houses were built in Madinat Al Kaaban by 1976.

Madinat Al Kaaban has a youth center which was officially inaugurated in November 2008. Nearby communities are also served by the center. Activities that take place at the center include charity festivals, children's festivals, girls' art workshops, and religious lectures.

== Visitor attractions ==
Madinat Al Kaaban Park was built in 2001 and is spread over 12,000 square meters. Many varieties of trees and shrubs can be observed at the park, including palm trees, Tecomas, and Cassias.

== Education ==
The following school is located in Madinat Al Kaaban:

Name of School	Curriculum	Grade	Genders	Official Website	Ref
Al Kaaban Boys School	Independent	Primary – Secondary	Male-only	N/A	
