= Umm Al Qubur =

Umm al Qubur القبور
- Abandoned village
- Location in Qatar
- Coordinates: 25°52′19″N 51°4′22″E
- Country: Qatar
- Municipality: Ash Shamal

Umm Al Qubur (Arabic: القبور) is an abandoned village in Qatar, located in the municipality of Ash Shamal. Archaeological excavations have been carried out on the site.

== Etymology ==
In Arabic, umm means "mother" and is commonly attached as a prefix to geographic features. The second word, qubur, is the local term for "graves".

== History ==
Based on field work carried out by anthropologist Henry Field in the 1950s, the main tribe in the area of Umm Al Qubur were the Al Jafali tribe.
