= Umm al Kilab =

Coordinates: 26°02′N 51°12′E

Umm al Kilab is a settlement in Qatar, in the municipality of Ash Shamal. Owing to its propensity for vegetation, various farms are based in the area.

In the past, its inhabitants excavated sections of its depressed terrain to create small reservoirs that would fill during rainy season.

== Etymology ==
As a depression where rainwater collects, the area is relatively rich in vegetation. In Arabic, umm translates to "mother" and is used at the beginning of place names to describe an area with a particular quality. The kilab portion of its name is the plural form of kalb, the Arabic word for dog. It was named in memory of a number of dogs that died in the area.

== Archaeology ==
The University of Copenhagen has worked with the Qatar Museums Authority to report on the Islamic Archaeology and heritage of Qatar.

An archaeological site dating back to the Abbasid period with a length of 410 m (1,350 ft) lies on the fringes of a depression in Umm Al Kilab. Trees, wells and remnants of old structures can be found here. Aforementioned structures are aligned with Mecca.

Numerous gastropod shells from Conus are found in the ruined village, despite being 6 km (3.7 mi) inland, and a shell mound is found at the north-east end. The purpose of these shells are unknown. Modern research has shown that some Conus shells are toxic to humans while others have potential for pain relief.
