= Ghaf Makin =

Settlement in Qatar

Coordinates: 25.983335°N 51.183329°E

Ghaf Makin is an abandoned settlement in Qatar, in the municipality of Ash Shamal. In 1917, it was described as a Bedouin camping ground with 6 wells yielding good water. It was also mentioned that a ruined fort was located in its confines.

The landscape of Ghaf Makin is typified by its depressions. As such, the low elevation ensured that the area would flood during the wet season and aid in the development of the freshwater lens, which is attested to by the relative abundance of grasses and trees.
