= Umm al-Ḥawaʼir =

Coordinates: 26°03′N 51°18′E

Umm al-Ḥawaʼir (Arabic: أُمّ اَلْحَوَائِر, romanized: Umm al Ḩawā'ir) is a settlement in northern Qatar, located in the municipality of Ash Shamal.

== Etymology ==
In Arabic, umm translates to mother and is used at the beginning of place names to ascribe an area with a particular geographic feature. "Hawa'ir" is derived from the Arabic term hawaya, roughly translating to "to consist of". This name was bestowed on it due to the area consisting of numerous geographic features, such as a rawda (depression), a well and several hills.
