= Al-Qaʽabiyah =

Coordinates: 26.0672°N 51.2586°E

Al-Qaʽabiyah (Arabic: لقعابية; also spelled Legaabiya) is a settlement in Qatar, located in the municipality of Ash Shamal. It is located 8 miles south-east of the city of Ar Ru'ays and is 7 miles from the coast. J.G. Lorimer mentioned Al Qa`abiyah in 1908 in his Gazetteer of the Persian Gulf, remarking on the presence of a masonry well yielding good water.
