= Natural areas of Qatar =

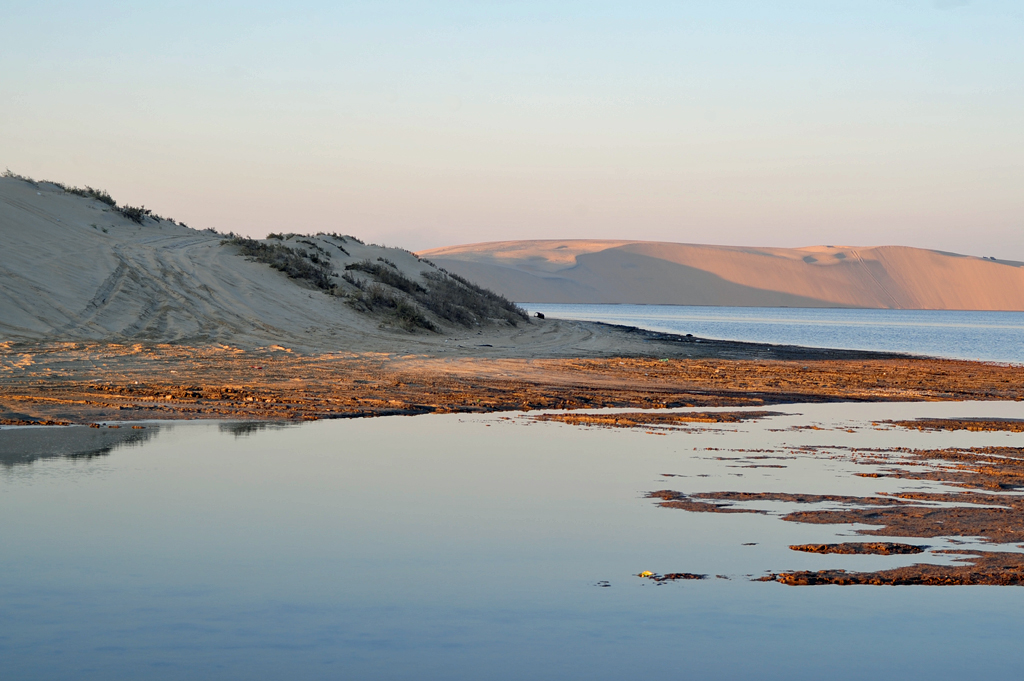
Desert landscape of Khor Al Adaid in southern Qatar

Protected areas of Qatar include:

- Al Reem Biosphere Preserve (designated in 2007, part of the World Network of Biosphere Reserves in the Arab States) in northwest Qatar
- Al Thakira Nature Reserve in Al Thakhira
- Al Wabra Wildlife Preservation in Al-Shahaniya
- Dahl Al Hamam Park, a sinkhole in the Dahl Al Hamam district of Doha (entrance to the hole is now closed to the public)
- Dahl Al Misfir in Rawdat Rashed
- Khor Al Adaid Reserve in Khor Al Adaid
- Khor Al Adaid Fish Sanctuary in Khor Al Adaid
- Mudhlem Cave in Mukaynis
- Ras Abrouq Nature Reserve (also known as Bir Zekreet and Zekreet Beach) in Ras Abrouq
- Ras Ushairij Gazelle Conservation Park in Ras Ushairij
- Umm Tais National Park in Umm Tais
