= Al-ʽAdhbah =

Al-ʽAdhbah عذبة
- Village
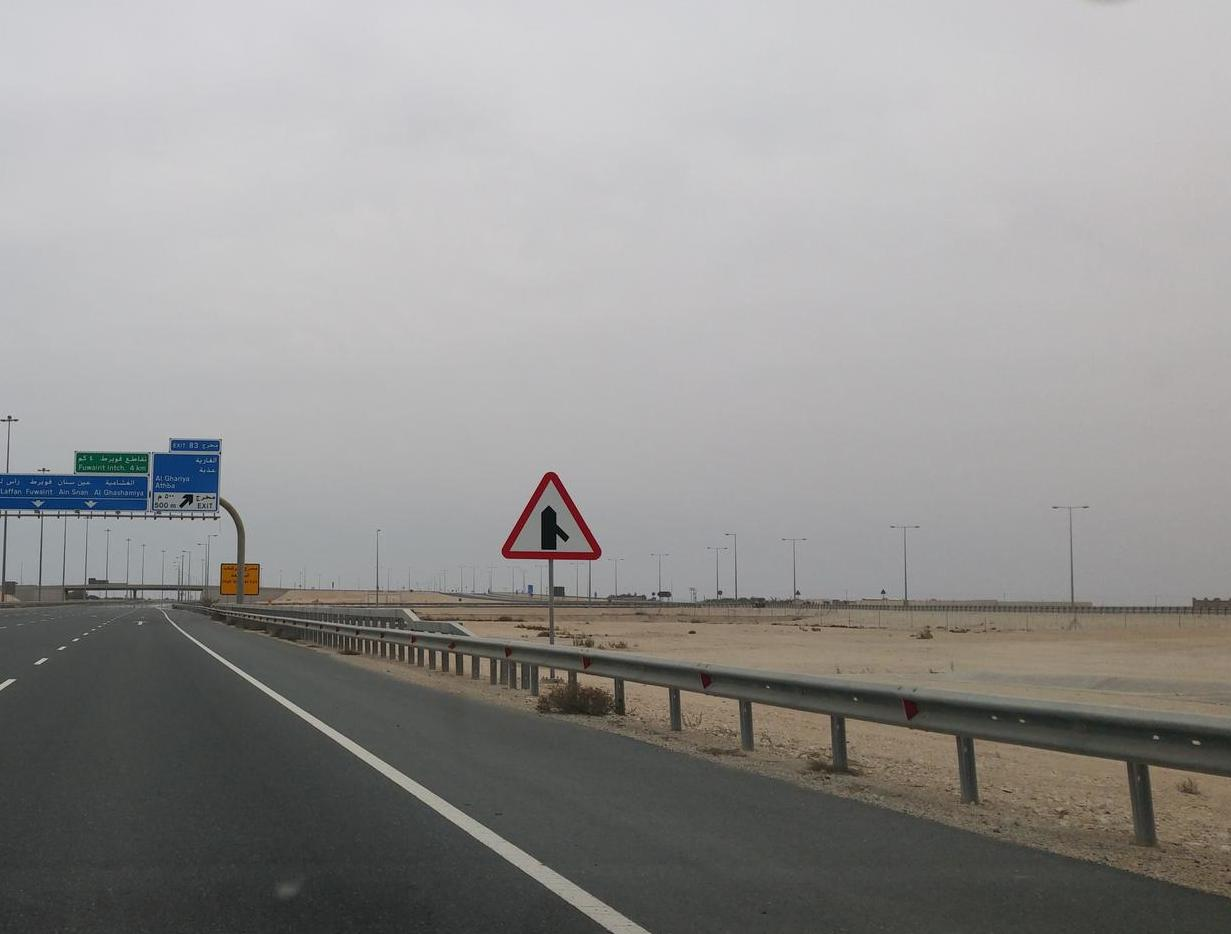
- Al Adhbah exit on Al Shamal Road

- Location in Qatar
- Coordinates: 26°3′6″N 51°19′19″E
- Country: Qatar
- Municipality: Ash Shamal

Al-ʽAdhbah (Arabic: عذبة; also spelled as Al Athbah) is a village in Qatar, located in the municipality of Ash Shamal. It previously served as Bedouin camping ground and had 5 masonry wells in the early 1900s.

== Etymology ==
In Arabic, ʽadhbah translates to "sweet". It was given this name because its fresh water was of good quality, with little salinity.

== Geography ==
Al Adhbah is located near the northeast coast. It forms part of the northern interior plain region. As such, the area around Al Adhbah is characterized by relatively flat terrain, typical of Qatar's interior regions.

Historically, the main villages situated directly on the coast such as Al Ghariyah and Fuwayrit often experienced water shortages because saltwater intrusion restricted direct access to the groundwater. Furthermore, the water that could be obtained was highly saline. As a result, Al Adhbah established a trade relationship with these villages in which it would receive maritime goods such as fish and pearls in exchange for its potable water.
