= Umm al Ghaylam =

Coordinates: 26°01′N 51°17′E

Umm al Ghayl Am (أم الـغـيـلام; also spelt Umm al Ghaylam) is a farming settlement in Qatar, located in the municipality of Ash Shamal.

== Etymology ==
In Arabic, umm translates to mother and is used at the beginning of place names to describe an area with a particular quality. The second constituent, ghaylam, is the name of a type of fish found in a well near the settlement.
