= Murwab =

Archaeological site in Qatar

- مروب (Arabic)
- Location within Qatar
- 25.859714°N 51.019597°E
- Type: Settlement
- Periods: Abbasid Period
- Location: Northwest Qatar

Site notes
- Excavation dates: 1984; 2009
- Archaeologists: C. Hardy-Guilbert; Alexandrine Guérin

Murwab (Arabic: مروب) is an archaeological site in northwest Qatar. A sizable village at one point, it was occupied from the beginning of the Abbasid Period until being abandoned in the late ninth century at the start of the Qarmatian Revolution. The site consists of 250 ruined houses, a fort and two mosques. Burial sites have been discovered near several of the houses.

== Etymology ==
Deriving its name from the Arabic term rhoub, which refers to a milk-based product formed with curds and whey, the area was so named due to rhoub being produced en masse by the shepherds to grazed their goats here.

== Location ==
Murwab is situated in northwest Qatar; 4 km (2.5 mi) off the coastline and 15 km (9.3 mi) north of the closest city, Dukhan. It is close to the archaeological site of Umm Al Maa.

== Discovery and excavations ==
Murwab was discovered by a Danish archaeological team headed by Geoffrey Bibby in 1959. A French team led by C. Hardy-Guilbert excavated the site in 1984. This was followed by an archaeological team led by Alexandrine Guérin in 2009.

== Findings ==
=== Wares ===
Excavators discovered 6,948 potsherds at the site. Most of the potsherds dated to 805–885 AD and were divided into groups of glazed wares and common wares. Common wares comprised 4,697 of the sherds and glazed wares accounted for the other 2,251 sherds. A study conducted by Faisal Al-Nuaimi and Alexandrine Guérin hypothesizes that the villagers were sold the wares in exchange for their pearls.

Most common wares are characteristically defined by their round shapes. At least 18% of the common ceramics carried traces of attempted repair. Scattered hearths containing bitumen traces found in ruined houses indicate that they were repaired on site.

Al-Nuaimi and Guerin contrasted the glazed wares –varying in design and color– with those found at the archaeological site of Susa in present-day Iran. They hypothesized that a portion of the glazed wares may have been imported directly from Susa. They further remarked that some of the glazed wares dating to the eighth and ninth centuries may have been derived from Basra and Samarra. The study noted the absence of Chinese wares, which are commonly found in other archaeological sites in Qatar.

=== Fort ===
Murwab fort is the oldest known fort in the country and was built over the ruins of a previous fort which was destroyed by fire. It is rectangular in shape and is thought to have served as a palatial residence. The structure is similar to other palatial residences dating to the Abbasid period elsewhere in the Middle East. A large courtyard with doors leading to twelve different rectangular rooms is in the center of the fort. The entrance, located on the north side, is 1.4 m (4.6 ft) wide. Construction materials used for the wall were rocks and mud.
