= Madinat ash Shamal =

Madinat ash Shamal الشمال
- City
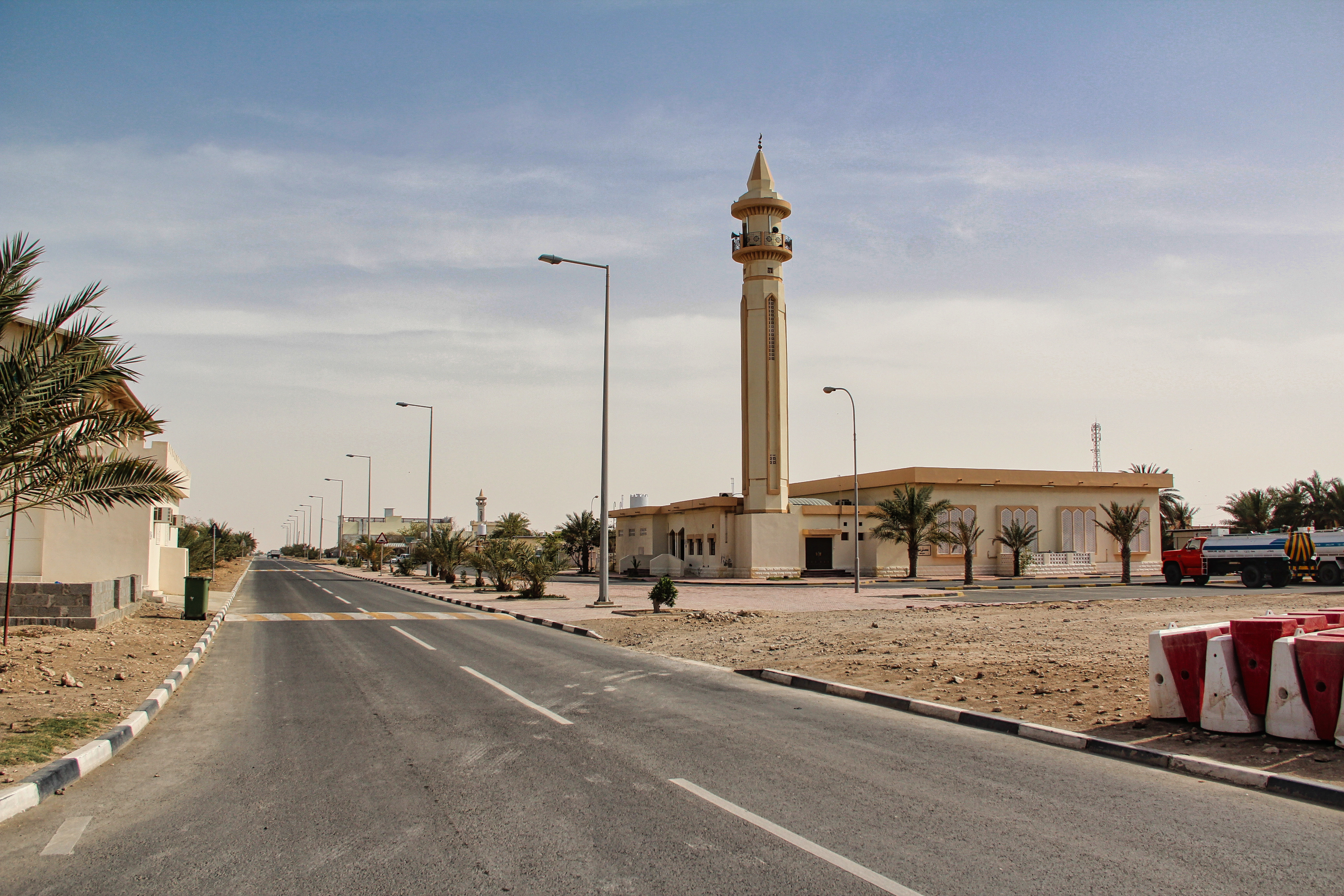
- Al Emam Malik Mosque on Al Baratha Street in Madinat Ash Shamal

- Madinat ash Shamal (الشمال)
- Coordinates: 26°07′00″N 51°13′00″E
- Country: Qatar
- Municipality: Al Shamal
- Zone no.: 79

Area
  - Total: 4.91 km^{2} (1.90 sq mi)

Madinat ash Shamal (Arabic: الشمال, romanized: Madīnat ash Shamāl) is the capital city of Al Shamal Municipality in Qatar. Located more than 100 kilometres (62 mi) north of Qatar's capital Doha, the city was founded in the 1970s, shortly after the country gained independence. It was delimited in 1988 and shares its boundaries with Ar-Ruʼays to the east and Abu Dhalouf to the west.

Madinat ash Shamal's creation came in an attempt to consolidate northern Qatar's industries and services into one main area. As a result, the city has several government offices in the Al Shamal Government Center and hosts the industrial hub of the municipality – Al Shamal Industrial Area.

== Etymology ==
The city's name "Madinat ash Shamal" is Arabic for "city of the north".

== History ==
Throughout most of the 20th century, Abu Dhalouf and Ar-Ruʼays were the largest villages on the northern coast. In the early 1970s, the Qatari government enacted a plan to establish Madinat ash Shamal between these two villages to serve as an administrative center for the north, in line with its policy of centralizing regional infrastructure and services into one main urban center. Throughout the 1970s, a road system and a port were built to connect the three villages.

Many of its early residents migrated from nearby rural villages such as Al Ghariyah and Al Arish due to the availability of basic infrastructure and services in Madinat ash Shamal. As part of a government housing project, 50 houses had been built in Madinat ash Shamal by 1976. Large-scale development of Madinat ash Shamal continued through the 1980s and 1990s.

The city joined the UNESCO Global Network of Learning Cities in November 2019, becoming the second city in the country to do so after Al Wakrah.

== Geography ==
Madinat ash Shamal is over 100 km (62 mi) from the capital Doha.

It is the main area of the two main habitation zones for the ghaf tree (Prosopis cineraria), the other being in Rawdat Rashed in central Qatar. According to a field study, there are over a dozen ghaf trees in Madinat ash Shamal that are over 100 years old. The tree, growing in sandy soils, is primarily used as fodder and firewood. Shrubs of qurdi (Ochradenus baccatus) are also found in the area.

== Visitor attractions ==
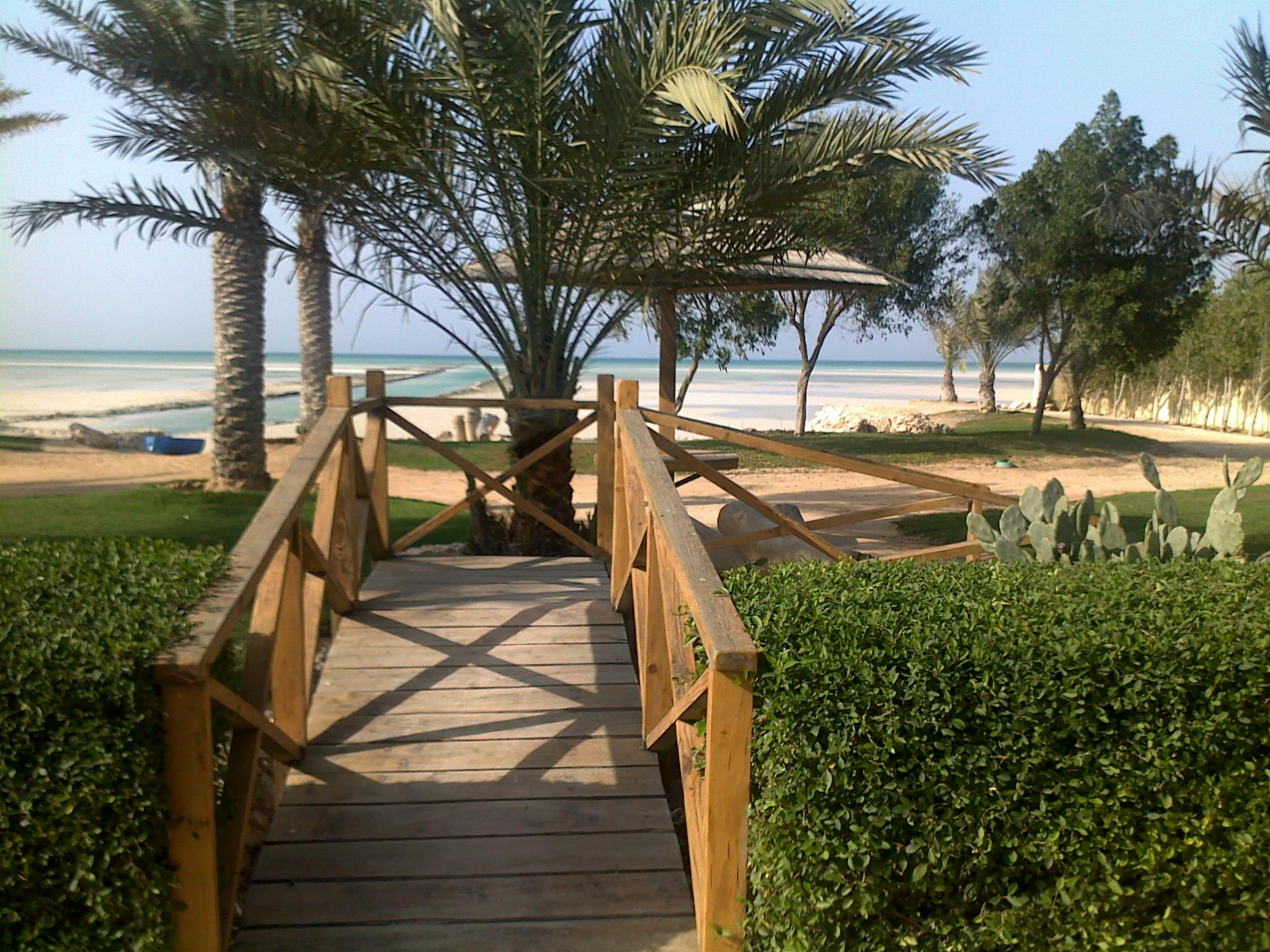
Madinat ash Shamal Park in 2010

=== Madinat ash Shamal Park ===
Situated next to the Al Shamal Municipality headquarters is Madinat ash Shamal Park. One of Qatar's larger parks, it occupies an area of 56,000 m^{2} (600,000 sq ft). Facilities in the park include a restaurant, café, bathrooms and a children's play area. Water features are present in the park, as well as an irrigation system to sustain its various plants.

=== Al Shamal Beach ===
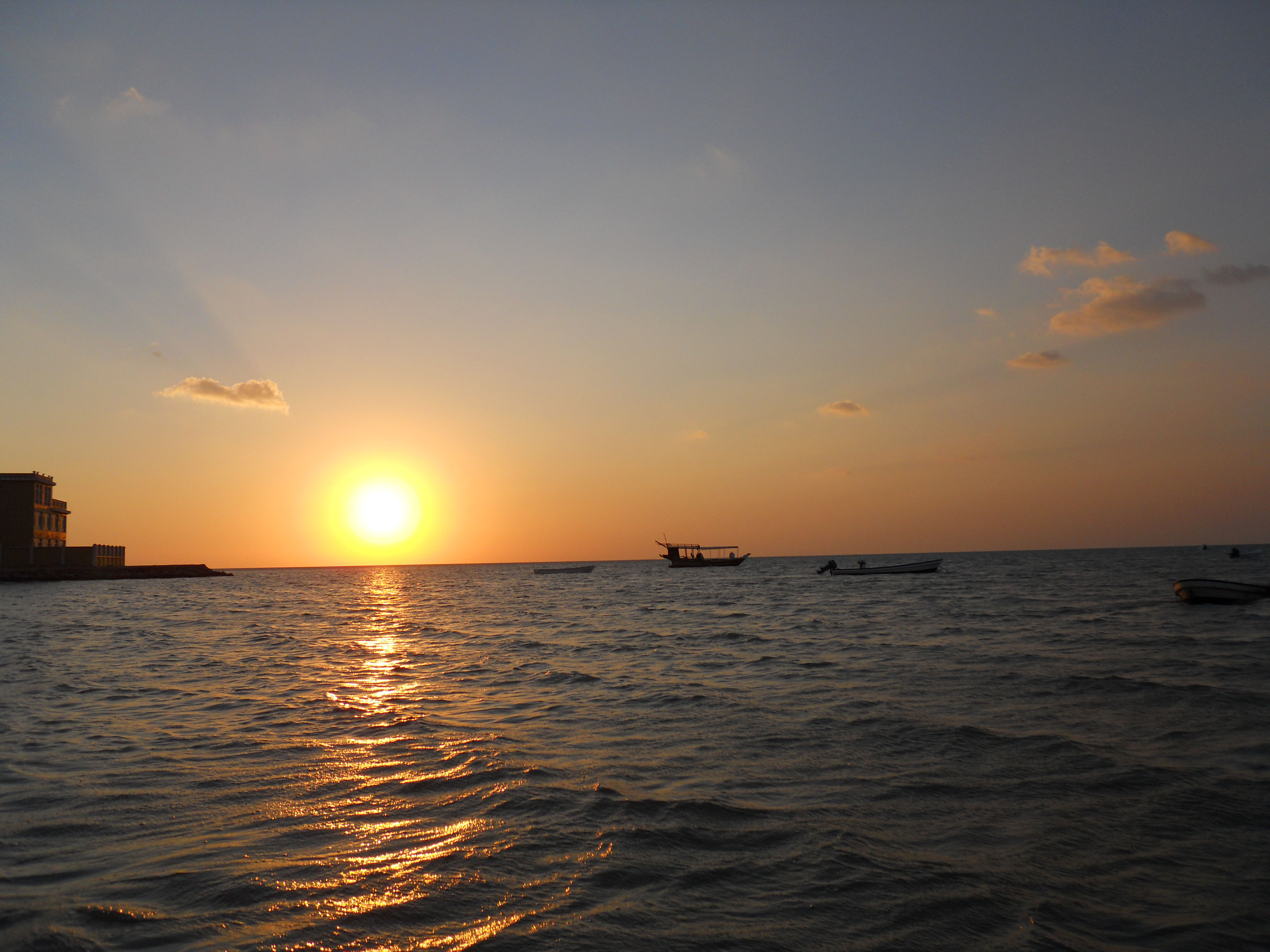
Sunset at Al Shamal Beach

Al Shamal Beach, encircled by the Al Shamal Corniche, is a popular tourist attraction in northern Qatar. A suitable beach for families with view of mangroves, the beach is popular because of the shallow depth of its waters, shading cover and its proximity to several archaeological sites and ghost towns.

=== Al Shamal Corniche ===
Shared with neighboring Abu Dhalouf and Ar-Ruʼays, among the features of Al Shamal Corniche are a pedestrian walkway stretching for 2,570 metres (8,430 ft), 450 trees, dozens of seats and shaded areas, and a playground. Ashghal completed a major redevelopment project of the corniche in 2018.

=== Al Shamal Mosque ===
Built around the 1950s, the Al Shamal Mosque was built using traditional construction methods, consisting of a mixture of clay, wood and stone. The roof, fashioned from mangrove sticks, forms a mesh atop sun-dried plaster and mud bricks. The mosque's minaret, standing 10 to 15 m (33 to 49 ft) tall, and has a cylindrical shape and octagonal base. It is detached from the main structure, and likely served both religious and defensive purposes, offering a vantage point for calls to prayer and surveillance of the surrounding desert. The mosque has undergone extensive restoration by the Ministry of Awqaf and Islamic Affairs. Modern amenities such as lighting and air conditioning were installed, while structural reinforcements addressed cracks and weather-induced damage, ensuring the preservation of the mosque.

== Infrastructure ==
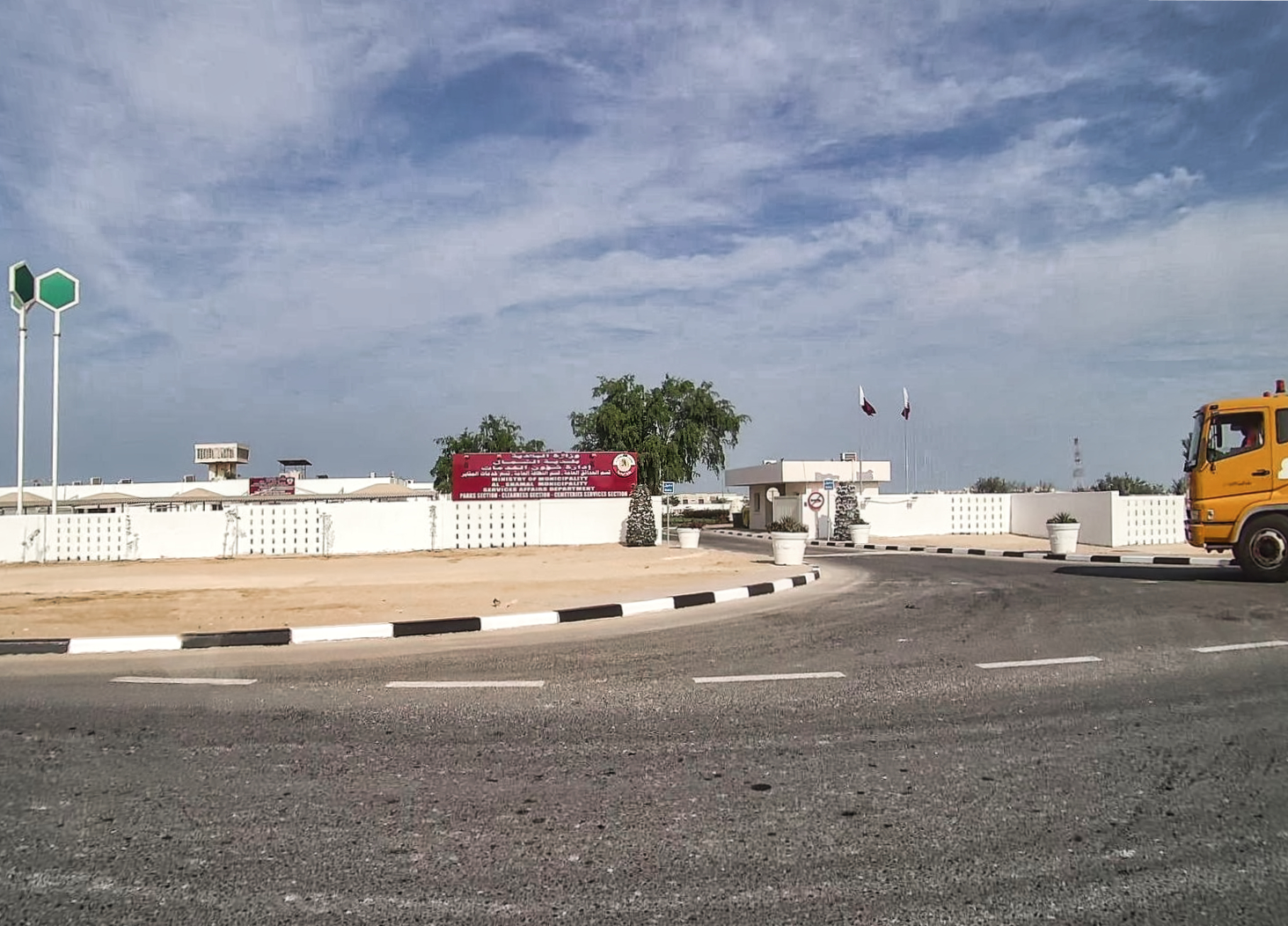
Outside view of Al Shamal Health Centre

The city's first public library was opened in 1979.

By 1976 the city had its first hospital, with 16 beds. At present, one of the only healthcare centers in the region is hosted by the city.

== Sports ==
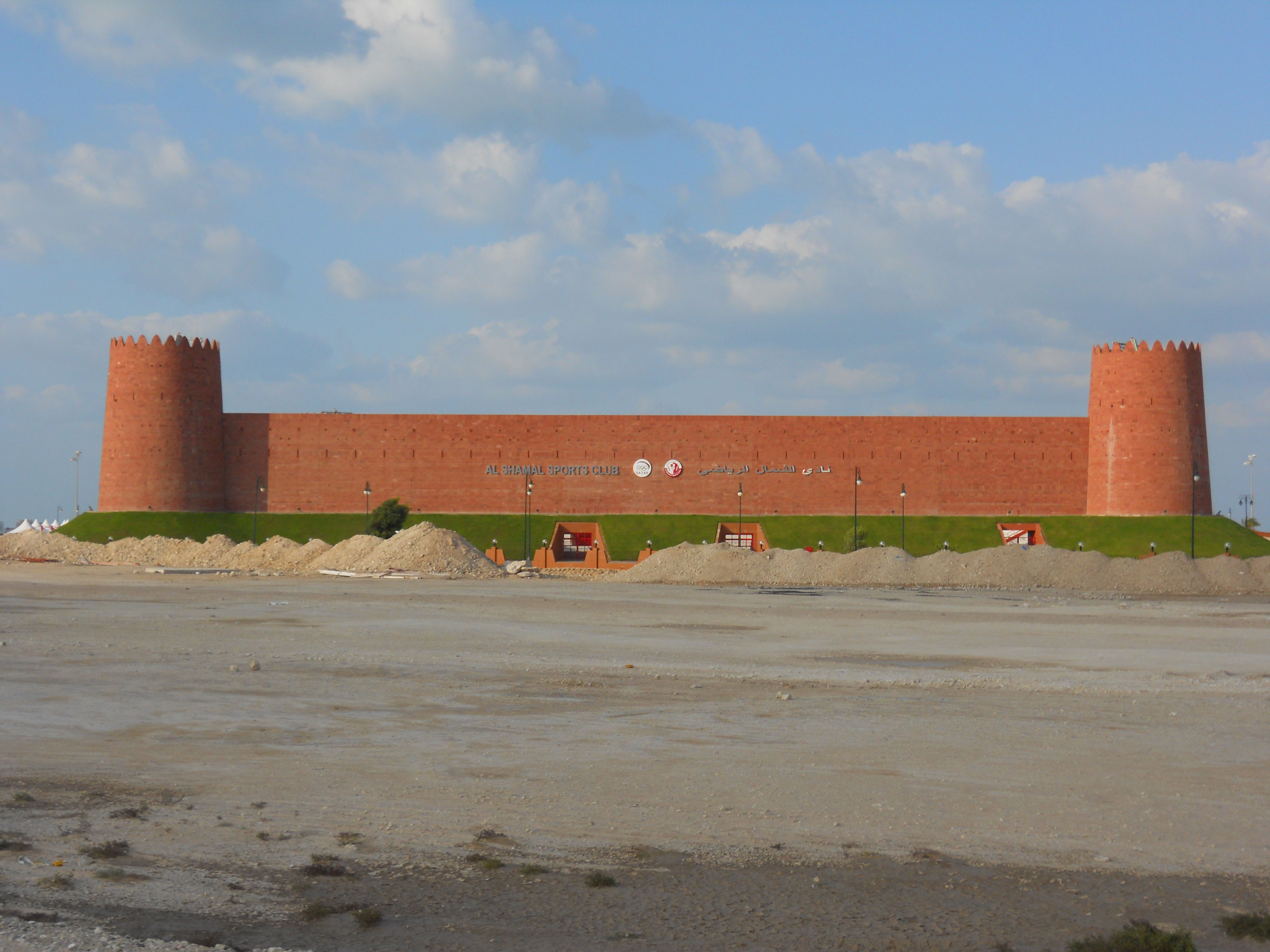
Al-Shamal SC Stadium

Multi-sports club Al Shamal SC is based in the city. They play their home games at Al-Shamal SC Stadium, which is fashioned after a traditional fort.

== Central Municipal Council ==
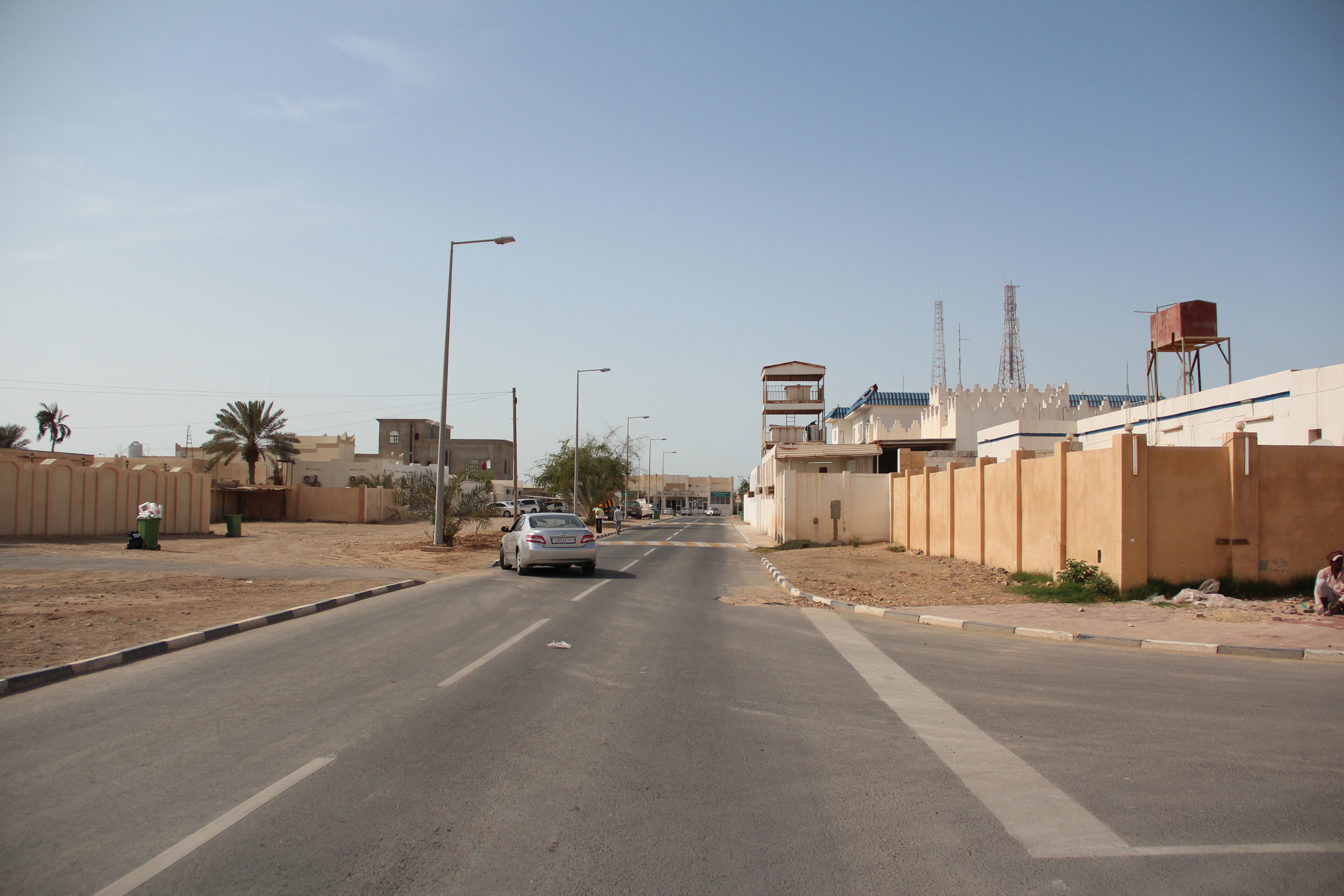
Looking towards the Al Meera Supercenter on Mesaika Street from Al Baratha Street

When free elections of the Central Municipal Council first took place in Qatar during 1999, Madinat ash Shamal was designated the seat of constituency no. 28. It would remain the headquarters of constituency no. 28 for the next three consecutive elections until the fifth municipal elections in 2015, when it was moved to constituency no. 29 and the seat was shared by Madinat ash Shamal and Ar Ru'ays. Also included in its constituency is Abu Dhalouf, Al Jumail, Zubarah, Ain Mohammed and Al-ʽArish.

In the inaugural municipal elections in 1999, Saad Ali Al Nuaimi won the elections, receiving 33.3%, or 64 votes. The runner-up candidate was Hussain Ibrahim Al Fadhalah, whose share of the votes was 18.2%, or 35 votes. Voter turnout was 87.7% Al Nuaimi retained his seat in the 2002, 2007 and 2011 elections. In the 2015 elections, Nasser Hassan Al-Kubaisi was elected constituency representative.

== Qatar National Master Plan ==
The Qatar National Master Plan (QNMP) is described as a "spatial representation of the Qatar National Vision 2030". As part of the QNMP's Urban Centre plan, which aims to implement development strategies in 28 central hubs that will serve their surrounding communities, Madinat ash Shamal has been designated a Town Centre, which is the third-highest designation. It is the only Urban Centre in the municipality.

Al Shamal Town Centre will be located at the midpoint of Madinat ash Shamal and its two neighboring settlements of Abu Dhalouf and Al Ruwais. The plan will focus on upgrading Al Ruwais Port, increasing tourism to the area, and preserving the coastal ecosystem. New mixed-use developments will be constructed to meet the commercial needs of the residents of the aforementioned settlements. Some of the planned buildings include a post office, a 123,965 m^{2} (1,334,350 sq ft) botanical garden, a theme park, a ladies club, a social centre, a new municipal office, and three new schools.
