= Al-Shamal SC Stadium =

Football stadium in Qatar

Coordinates: 26°07′04.9″N 51°13′15.7″E

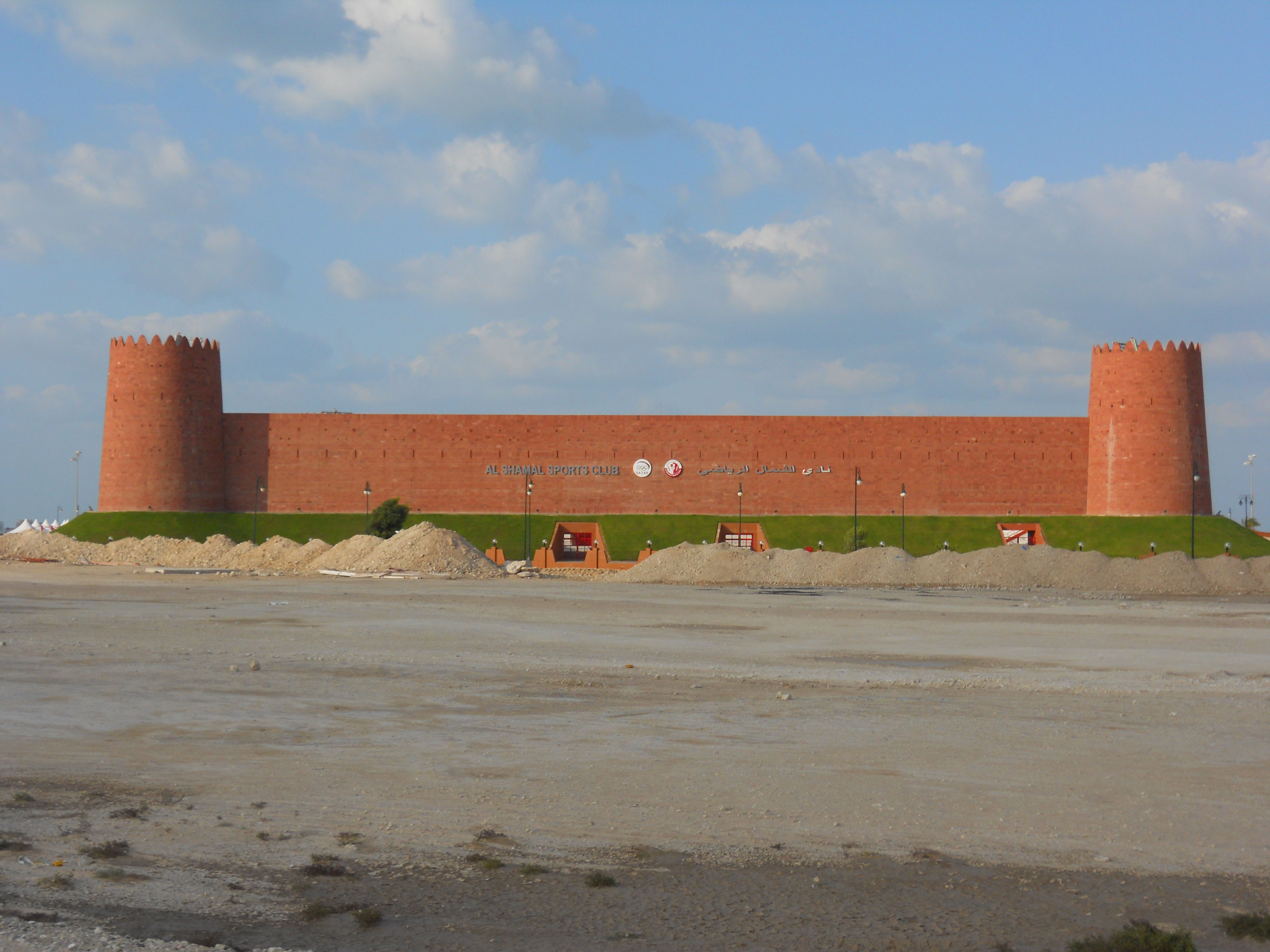
- Interactive map of Al-Shamal SC Stadium
- Location: Madinat ash Shamal, Qatar
- Capacity: 5,000
- Surface: Grass

Construction
- Built: 2008–2011
- Opened: 2011

Tenant
- Al-Shamal SC

Al-Shamal SC Stadium is a football stadium in Madinat ash Shamal, in northern Qatar. It is the home venue of Qatar Stars League team Al-Shamal SC. The stadium holds a capacity of 5,000 people. It was opened in 2011.

The stadium was designed after the historic Zubarah Fort, its red bricks being imported from India.

== History ==
During the 2022 FIFA World Cup held in Qatar, the Germany national team was based at Zulal Wellness Resort in nearby Ar Ru'ays and used the stadium in its training and preparation for World Cup matches.

== See also ==
- Al-Shamal Stadium
