= Yusufiyah (Qatar) =

Yusufiyah يُوسُفِيَّة Yūsufīyah
- Abandoned town
- Location in Qatar
- Coordinates: 26°06′46″N 51°09′01″E
- Country: Qatar
- Municipality: Al Shamal

Yusufiyah (Arabic: يُوسُفِيَّة, romanized: Yūsufīyah) is an abandoned village in Qatar located in the municipality of Al Shamal. It was previously one of the most important towns on Qatar's north coast. An old stone fort, Qalaat Yusufiyeh, is found here.

Nearby settlements include Al Jumail to the south and Abu Dhalouf to the immediate east.

== Etymology ==
There is some uncertainty regarding the origin of Yusufiyah's name. According to the Ministry of Municipality, the village's name is credited to the Yusifiyeh tribe who, in the past, resided here. This theory is disputed by the Al Mannai tribe, who claim that the name was chosen after the settlement of Yusufiyah in their ancestral homeland, Iraq.

== History ==
According to family tradition, the Al Mannai tribe was one of the earliest tribes to settle the area, doing so in the 17th century after being displaced from Iraq. Historical documents state that in 1671, the settlement was ruled by Saleh bin Damahm Al-Mannai. In 1738, Qalaat Yusufiyah was built to defend the village from sea raids. The village was later abandoned by the Al Mannai in favor of Abu Dhalouf to the east.

In the 18th century, according to contemporary Arabic sources, there were about 1,500 members of the Al Bu Hussein tribe residing here. Carsten Niebuhr, an 18th-century German explorer who visited the Arabian Peninsula, created one of the first maps to depict the settlements of Qatar in 1765 in which Yusufiyah was among the few included.

Major Colebrook, a British official, compiled a brief report on the towns in Qatar on 10 September, 1820. In it he states:

Ul Yusvee (Al Yusufiyah) and Roes (Ruwais) are two villages to the west of Ras Rekkan (Rakkan), the inhabitants of which had latterly removed to Bahrein. Limel (Al Jumail), Yusvee and Roes, have khoors or back waters, which are shallow. Batils can enter at high tide, but at low water they are quite dry, and the sea coast very shallow. Yusvee has a square Ghurry and fresh water.

In the 1820s, George Barnes Brucks was tasked with preparing the first British survey of the Persian Gulf. He wrote down the following notes about Yusufiyah, referring to it as Yossfee:

"Yossfee, in lat. 26° 5' N., long. 51° 14' E., is a small village, with a fort, belonging to Bahrein. It has about fifty inhabitants, of mixed tribes, all fishermen."
