= Ar-Ruʼays =

Ar-Ruʼays اَلرُّؤَيْس
- Town
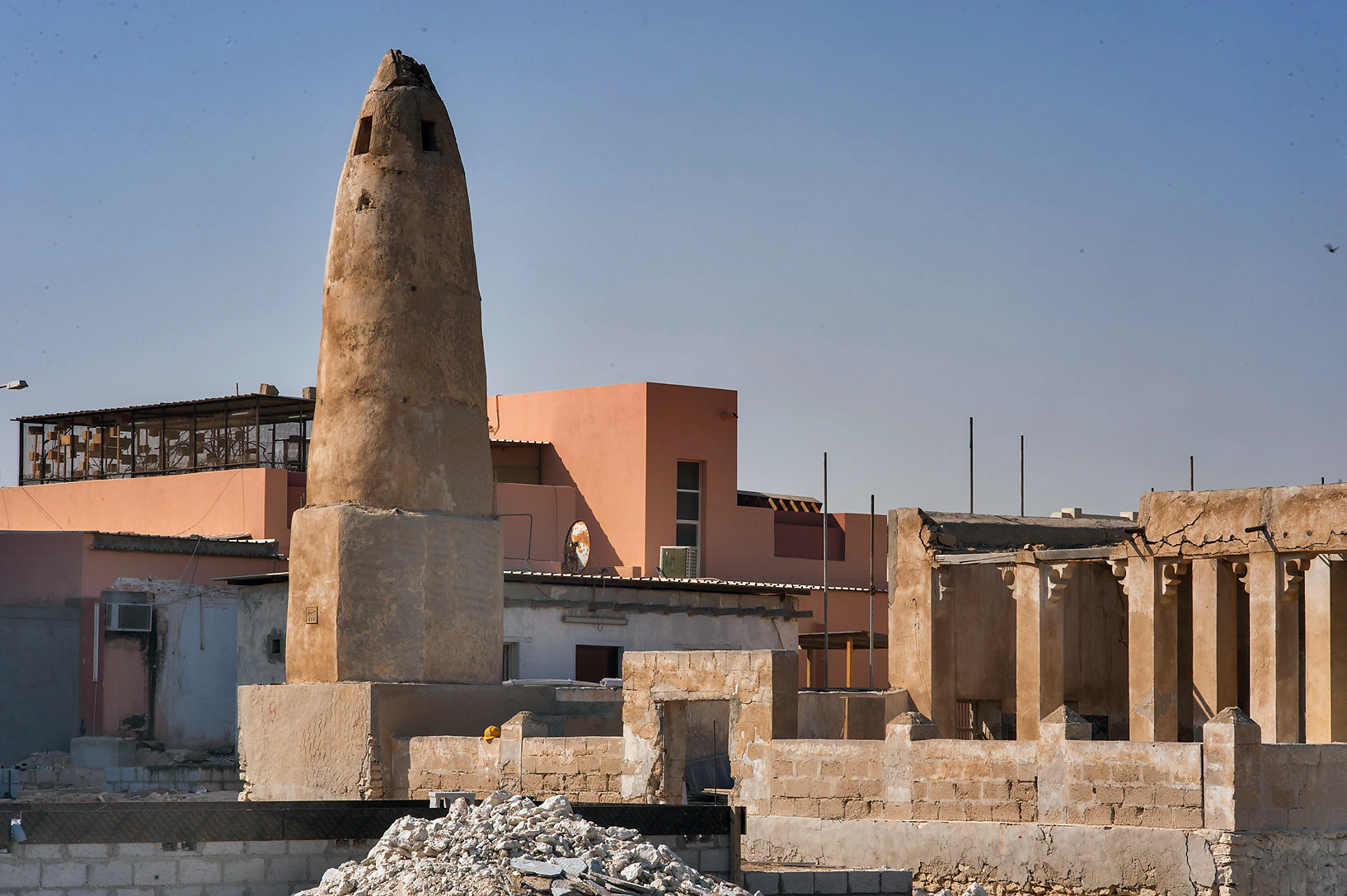
- A close-up of the historic Al Ruwais Mosque

- Ar Ru'ays
- Coordinates: 26°08′00″N 51°13′00″E
- Country: Qatar
- Municipality: Ash Shamal
- Zone no.: 79
- District no.: 423

Area
  - Total: 3.5 km^{2} (1.4 sq mi)

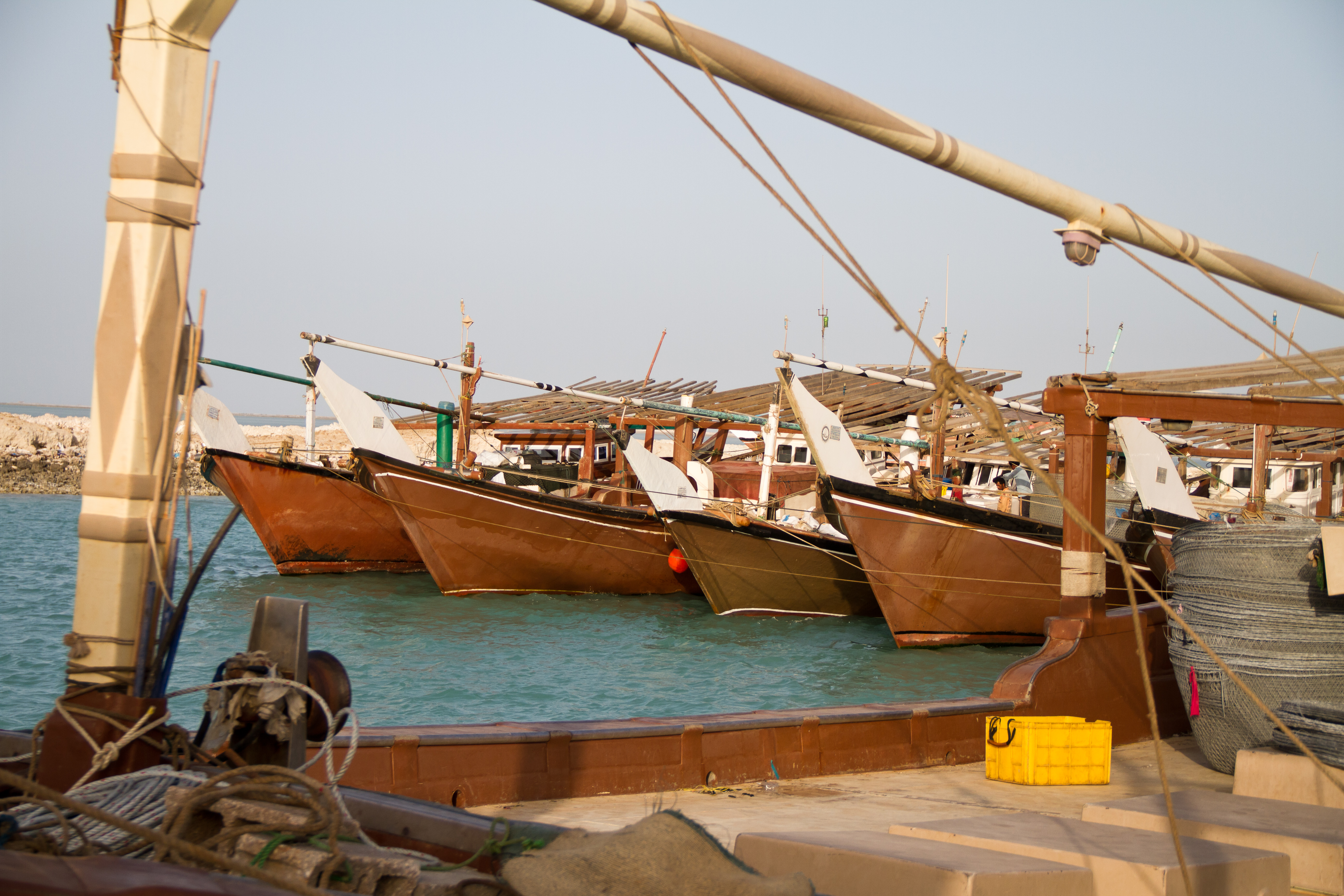
Dhows in Al Ruwais Port

Ar-Ruʼays (Arabic: اَلرُّؤَيْس), also spelled Al Ruwais, is a port town in the Qatari municipality of Al Shamal. It is located on the northern tip of Qatar, approximately 127 km (79 miles) north of the capital Doha. Before the country's economic landscape was transformed by oil extraction, Al Ruwais was one of the most important fishing centers on the peninsula.

The town is best known for the Al Ruwais Port, the second-most important port in Qatar. It is also known for accommodating what is thought to be the earliest-constructed surviving mosque in Qatar. The northernmost point of Qatar, Ras Rakan, is located 2.5 miles (4.0 km) to the northwest.

== Etymology ==
Ar Ru'ays translates to "small head" in Arabic. It was so named because the town juts out into the sea relative to the land surrounding it.

== History ==
=== 18th century ===
Family tradition states that Al Ruwais was one of the initial destinations that the Al Thani moved to before settling in Fuwayrit in the late 1700s. At the time, it was considered to be the capital of the Al Jalahma tribe, who were one of the Bani Utbah clans who migrated from Kuwait in the mid-18th century.

=== 19th century ===
In the 1820s, George Barnes Brucks carried out the first British survey of the Persian Gulf. He recorded the following notes about Al Ruwais, which he referred to as Rooes:

"The centre tower of Rooese is in lat. 26° 8' 25" N., long. 51° 18' 50" E. It is a small town, much in ruins, situated on a shallow backwater, into which the boats belonging to this part of the coast enter at high-water. The inhabitants are about one hundred, of the Abookara [Al Kuwari] and Uttoobee [Bani Utbah] Tribes, subject to Bahrein; they are mostly fishermen."

A survey conducted by the British Hydrographic Office in 1890 describes Al Ruwais as "a small town on the mainland, 2 ½ miles south of Ras Rakan; it has four towers on the fort, which is the first thing seen from the northward when making the land. They have many boats, which run in over the reef, and anchor in shelter close to the beach. The fort is visible 6 or 7 miles".

For defensive purposes, in the 1890s sheikh Jassim bin Mohammed Al Thani ordered all of Qatar's northernmost settlements, including Al Ruwais, to be evacuated and its inhabitants moved to Al Bidda, Al Wakrah and Khor Al Shaqiq.

=== 20th century ===
At the start of the 20th century, Al Ruwais was described as such in J.G. Lorimer's Gazetteer of the Persian Gulf:

A village of Qatar, the nearest to the top of the promontory, about 2 ½ miles south of Ras Rakan. It is inhabited by about 70 families of the Sadah tribe who own 18 pearl boats, 2 other sea-going vessels and 10 fishing boats; they also have 4 horses and 20 camels. There is a reef in front of the village within which the boats belonging to it anchor. The place is protected by a small fort with four towers, and drinking water is fetched from the Umm Dha'an well, 1 ½ miles inland south of Ruwais.

In a 1904 transcript of Lorimer's Gazetteer, he remarks that, before 1856, roughly 100 inhabitants of the Bu Kuwara and Utub tribes resided in Al Ruwais, reiterating the details in G.B. Bruck's earlier survey.

=== Modernization ===
Al Ruwais became the second settlement outside of the capital Doha to construct a formal school in 1954. Based on field work carried out by anthropologists in Qatar in the 1950s, the main tribe in the area of Al Ruwais were the Al Sadah tribe. Throughout the 20th century it was considered the educational nucleus of northern Qatar.

In the late 1960s, Al Ruwais was among the northern Qatari towns designated to benefit from the initial phase of a state housing program. Completed in 1969, the program provided modern residences and basic utilities to local families as part of a national project to improve living standards.

After Qatar earned its independence in 1971, Sheikh Khalifa bin Hamad Al Thani assumed control of the newly-found state in February 1972. One of his main policies was the decentralization of Qatar's housing and major infrastructure projects. To promote growth in the northern settlements, he designated Al Ruwais a 'township' and launched several projects in it, including in 1972 the construction of the Al Ruwais Port.

In a 1987 article in the local Arabic newspaper Al Raya, Al Ruwais was described as a town of about 1,000 residents with old homes stretching along the coast. Known for its beautiful beaches, Al Ruwais was noted as being historically significant as a hub for fishing and pearling activities. Despite a rapidly growing population, the town faced issues such as unpaved roads, and lack of signage at its entrance, making it difficult for visitors to locate the town.

Residents of Al Ruwais recalled traveling to Doha by foot or on camels. Al Ruwais had essential services, including a health center, post office, schools (elementary, middle, and high), a consumer cooperative, telephone services, a police station, and a bank. The community had also established numerous supermarkets and tailor shops, as well as a library. It had a thriving sports culture, particularly in football, with the Al Shamal Sports Club playing a significant role. Al Ruwais was historically inhabited by tribes such as the Bu Kuwara, Al Sada, Al Ka'ban, and Al Dawasir, with the majority then being Al Sada. Other residents had relocated from villages like Ain Mohammed, Al Khuwayr, Al Jumail, Al Mafjar, Al Tuwim, and Al Ghariyah.

== Geography ==
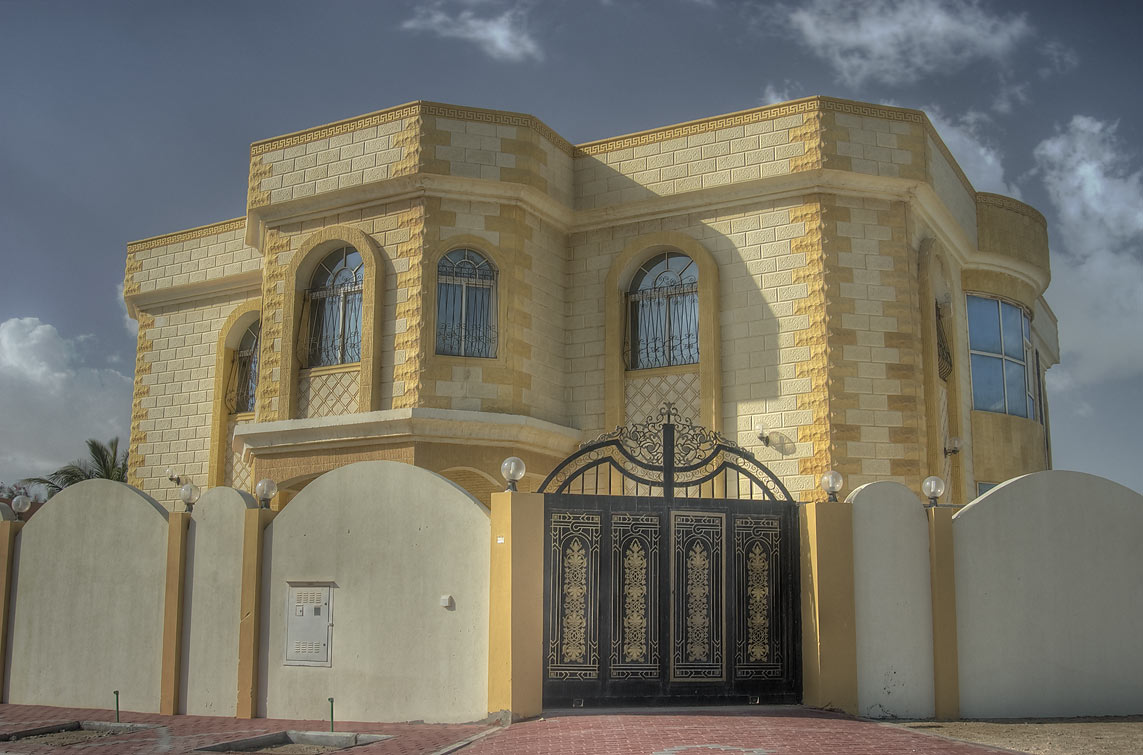
Yellow stone house

Situated along the northern coastline, Al Ruwais is bordered by the villages of Madinat ash Shamal and Abu Dhalouf to the immediate west. It is roughly 127 km (79 miles) northwest of the capital Doha, 25 km (16 miles) northwest of Fuwayrit, 28 km (17 miles) northeast of Zubarah, and 77 km (48 miles) northwest of Al Khor.

The area around Al Ruwais is generally characterized by a flat surface, lacking significant topographical complexities. This resembles much of the northern side of Qatar's coastal plain region, of which Al Ruwais is the northernmost extension. Between Al Jumail and Al Ruwais, the coastline features several indentations.

Al Ruwais' coastal area is a popular destination due to its lush vegetation. In January 1986, at a cost of nearly QR 1,000,000, the Permanent Committee for Environmental Protection completed a thorough elimination of any oil- and construction-related wastes on the Al Ruwais Beach and other beaches in Al Shamal. Since its establishment, the Ministry of Municipality and Environment has embarked on campaigns to restore the mangroves that grow abundantly on its coast. Roughly 13 hectares of coastal mangroves are found in Al Ruwais.

=== Climate ===
The following is climate data for Ar Ru'ays obtained from Qatar Meteorology Department.

Climate data for Ar Ru'ays (1992-2021)
| Month | Jan | Feb | Mar | Apr | May | Jun | Jul | Aug | Sep | Oct | Nov | Dec | Year |
|---|---|---|---|---|---|---|---|---|---|---|---|---|---|
| Mean daily maximum °C (°F) | 20.5 (68.9) | 21.4 (70.5) | 24.2 (75.6) | 28.5 (83.3) | 33.0 (91.4) | 34.9 (94.8) | 36.6 (97.9) | 37.1 (98.8) | 35.5 (95.9) | 32.3 (90.1) | 27.4 (81.3) | 22.8 (73.0) | 29.5 (85.1) |
| Daily mean °C (°F) | 18.3 (64.9) | 18.9 (66.0) | 21.4 (70.5) | 25.5 (77.9) | 30.1 (86.2) | 32.6 (90.7) | 34.2 (93.6) | 34.5 (94.1) | 32.9 (91.2) | 29.8 (85.6) | 25.1 (77.2) | 20.8 (69.4) | 27.0 (80.6) |
| Mean daily minimum °C (°F) | 16.0 (60.8) | 16.6 (61.9) | 18.8 (65.8) | 22.6 (72.7) | 27.2 (81.0) | 29.8 (85.6) | 31.3 (88.3) | 31.5 (88.7) | 29.6 (85.3) | 26.6 (79.9) | 22.6 (72.7) | 18.6 (65.5) | 24.3 (75.7) |
| Average precipitation mm (inches) | 16.5 (0.65) | 13.6 (0.54) | 12.4 (0.49) | 6.9 (0.27) | 0.9 (0.04) | 0 (0) | 0 (0) | 0 (0) | 0.7 (0.03) | 1.3 (0.05) | 15.8 (0.62) | 15.8 (0.62) | 83.9 (3.31) |
| Average relative humidity (%) | 74 | 72 | 70 | 66 | 64 | 66 | 69 | 72 | 70 | 71 | 71 | 76 | 70 |
Source: https://www.qweather.gov.qa/CAA/ClimateNormals.aspx

== Historic architecture ==
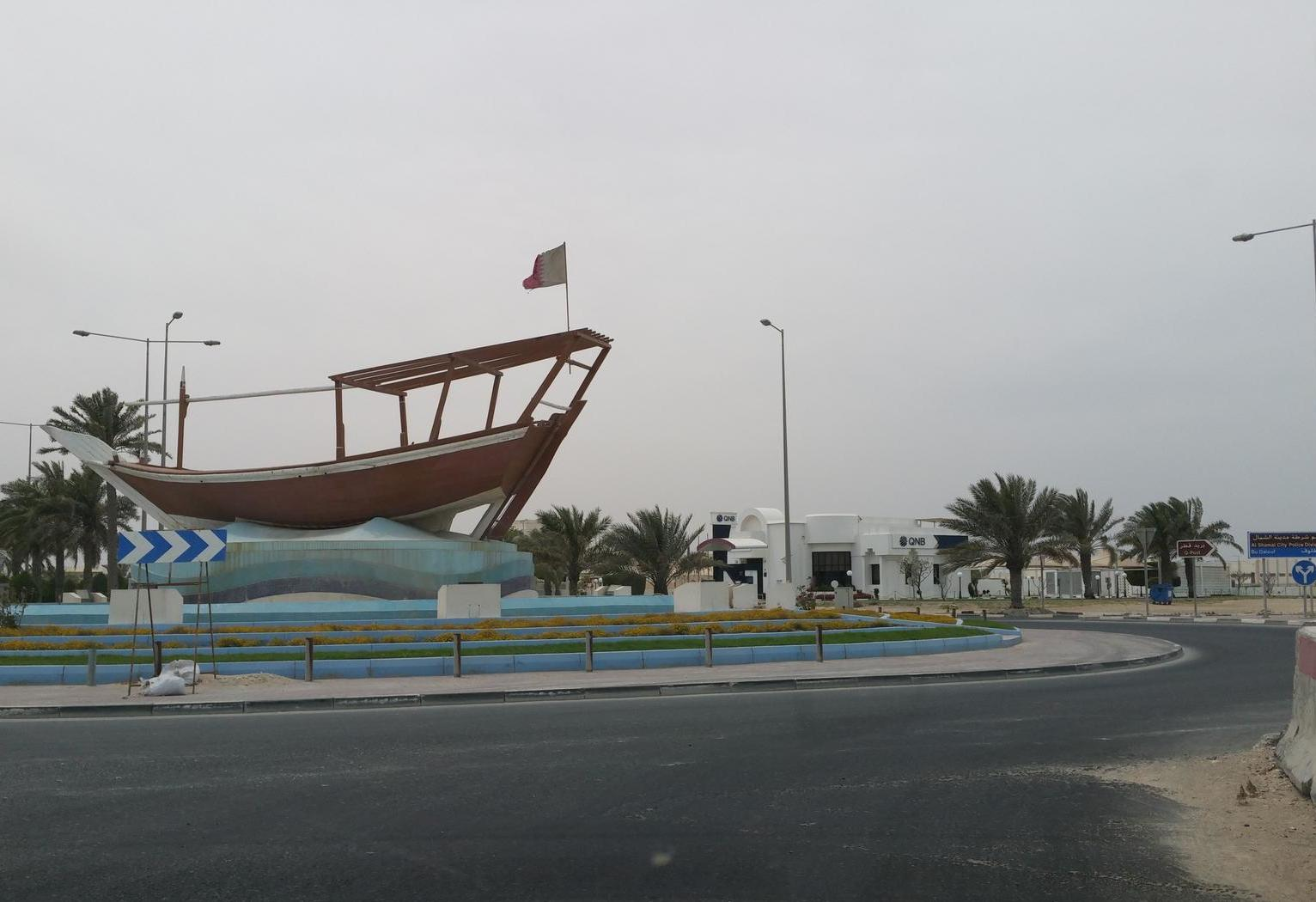
Dhow Roundabout in Al Ruwais provides access to both the Al Ruwais Police Station and the Al Ruwais Port.

=== Al Ruwais Mosque ===
One of the earliest harbor towns in Qatar, Al Ruwais accommodates what is believed to be the oldest surviving mosque in Qatar. Initially built around the 17th century, Ruwais Mosque was reconstructed in the 1940s. According to local tradition, the mosque was constructed at the behest of Ahmed Ezz el-Din bin Kassab Al-Sadah. After being struck by lightning in 1970, the minaret wall was reconstructed using seashell brick. As a result of the mosque's worsening exterior condition, the Qatar Museums Authority launched a restoration project in 2014. From December 2014 to January 2015, archaeologists from the Qatar Museums Authority also excavated the eastern portion of the mosque, unearthing pottery shards, animal bones and coins. It is rectangular in shape, with an open courtyard, and can hold around 100 worshipers. The Ministry of Tourism and Al Shamal Municipality are coordinating to preserve the mosque and to promote it as a tourist attraction.

=== Al Ruwais Police Station ===
Erected in 1955 on a vacant partially isolated plot of land, the Al Ruwais Police Station previously served the city and its port. Besides enforcing laws and local ordinances, the police also served as a customs security for the port, of which it was in close proximity to. At present, the police station has been repurposed into a museum for finds from the nearby archaeological site of Ruwayda.

== Visitor attractions ==
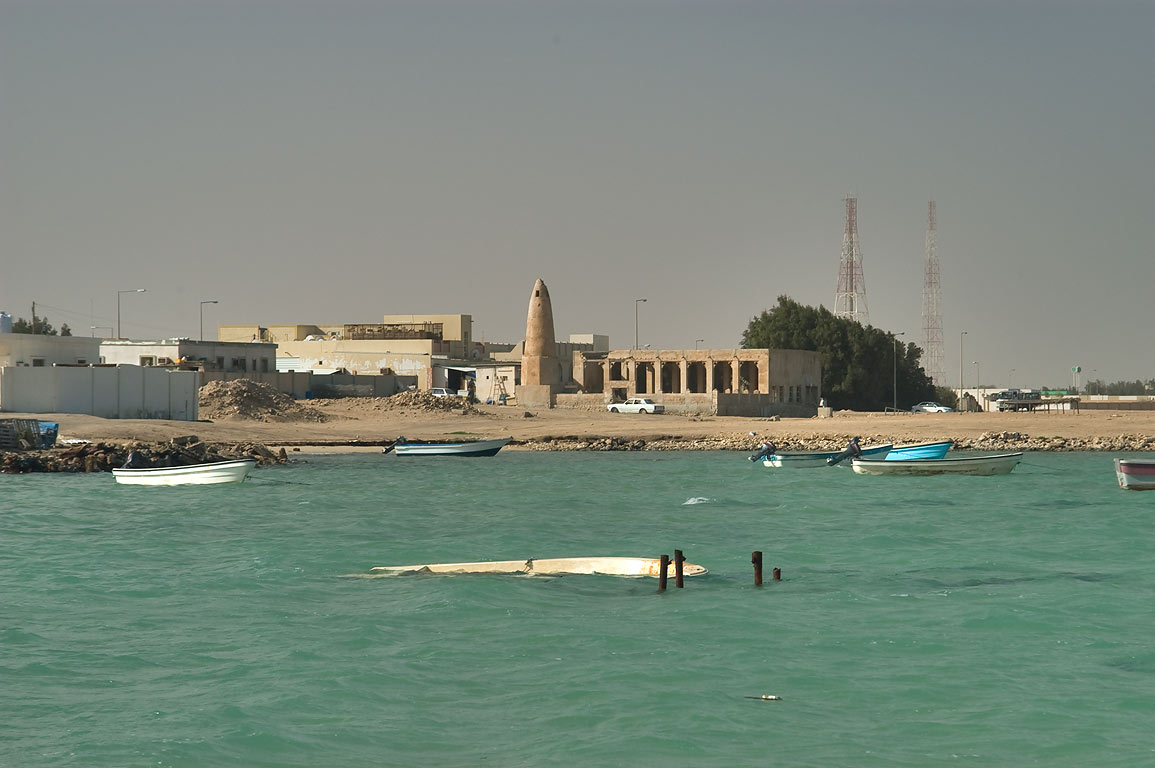
Beach, with the historical Al Ruwais Masjid in center background.

Al Ruwais is a popular birdwatching spot.

A sculpture of a family of dugongs by Ahmed Albahrani was installed on Al Ruwais beach in 2022. It was installed as part of a nation-wide public art campaign by Qatar Museums.

In May 2018, the Al Shamal Corniche was inaugurated in Al Ruwais. It features a 2,570 m (8,430 ft)-long promenade, 120 parking spots and 450 trees. Still to be developed facilities include a children's play area spanning 2,000 m (1.2 miles).

== Infrastructure ==
A government complex housing a Ministry of Justice office was opened in Al Ruwais in July 2014.

=== Al Ruwais Port ===
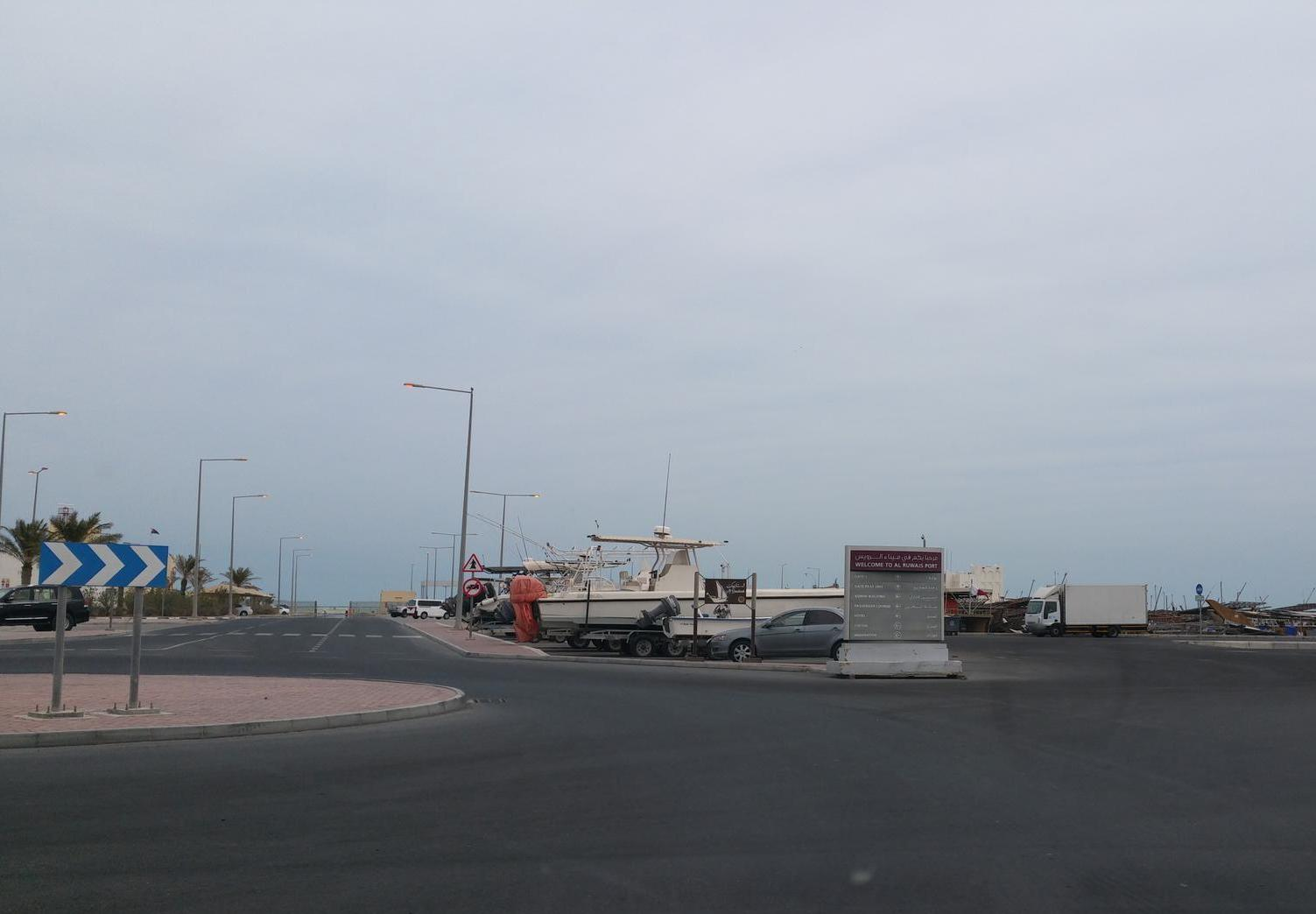
Entrance sign for Al Ruwais Port.

Al Ruwais Port is a shallow-water port and can host small vessels up to 100 m LOA with a maximum draft of 4.8 m. In the late 20th century, the port began passenger ferries between Qatar and Bahrain.

Ashghal (The Public Works Authority) announced in April 2009 that it would be accepting bids from contractors for three stages of construction on Al Ruwais Port, which would include a 10,000 m^{2} built up area. Another initiative to develop port infrastructure was the Al Ruwais Port development project, which had the stated aim of transforming Al Ruwais Port into northern Qatar's pathway to the world and was formally launched in January 2015 by Prime Minister Abdullah bin Nasser Al Thani. It was reported that, in June 2017, Al Ruwais Port had 57 ships with an overall capacity reaching 10,745 tons.

Mwani Qatar, the authority overseeing the port, established a 77,000 m^{2} truck parking lot with 285 spaces near Al Ruwais Port. It became fully operational in March 2018.

In December 2018, Mwani, the port authority, officially launched the second phase of the development project started four years prior. As part of this phase, it will undergo a 156,000 m^{2} expansion, nearly tripling its capacity. It was announced that after the completion of the first phase, Al Ruwais Port was capable of exchanging up to 20,000 containers per year, up from 1,000 containers per year prior to the phase's completion. It was expected that by 2020 the port would have 300 additional berths.

=== Libraries ===
Qatari writer and researcher Ali Abdullah Al Fayedh opened his library in Ruwais in 2017. Located in a small 360-square-meter villa, the library contains over 21,000 Arabic-language books, mostly about Qatar-related topics, particularly its cultural history.

The Ali Bin Hussein Al-Sada Library was opened in May 2021. The library mainly features Arabic-language Islamic literature but also contains books related to science, poetry, and language.
