= Al-Shamal Stadium =

- Interactive map of Al-Shamal Stadium
- Location: Ash-Shamal, Qatar
- Coordinates: 26°08′N 51°13′E
- Owner: Qatar Football Association
- Capacity: 45,120 (proposed)
- Surface: Grass

Construction
- Architect: Albert Speer & Partner GmbH

Al-Shamal Stadium (Arabic: ملعب الشمال) was a proposed football stadium in Ash-Shamal, Qatar. It was proposed as part of the Qatar 2022 FIFA World Cup bid, and would have had a capacity of 45,120. After the World Cup, the stadium would have been downsized to 25,000. The stadium was not built, and other venues would host games at Qatar 2022.

== Plans ==
The design was created by a renowned German architect and urban planner Albert Speer & Partners, and was derived from the traditional dhow a traditional type of sailling vessel, the local fishing boats commonly used in Arab States of the Persian Gulf.

== See also ==
- Al-Shamal SC Stadium - 5,000 seater stadium located nearby, home to Al-Shamal SC
