= Al Jumail =

Al Jumail اَلْجُمَيْل
- Abandoned town
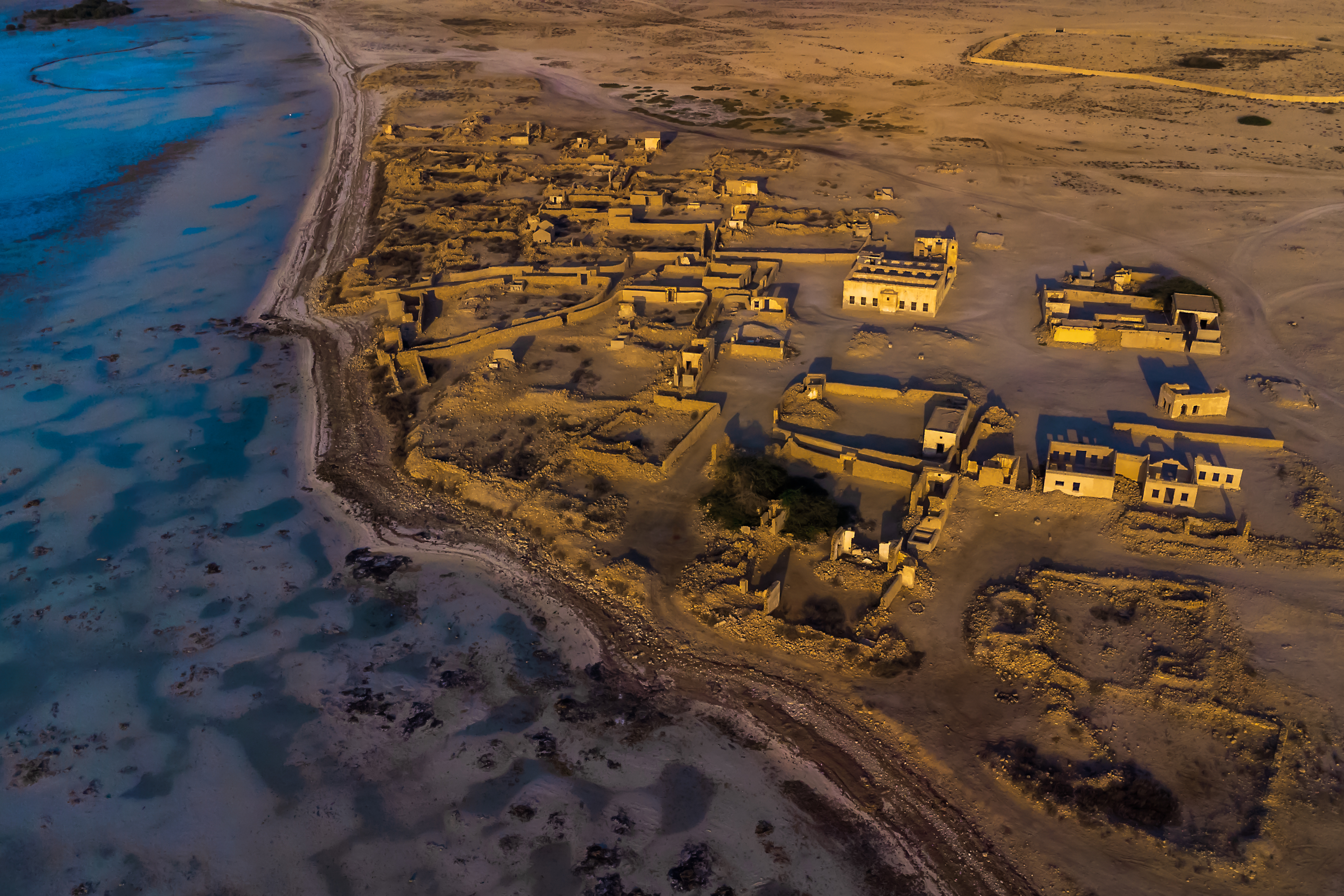
- Aerial view of Al Jumail

- Location in Qatar
- Coordinates: 26°05′59″N 51°09′40″E
- Country: Qatar
- Municipality: Al Shamal
- Zone: Zone 78
- District no.: 395

Area
  - Total: 2.3 sq mi (6.0 km^{2})

Al Jumail (Arabic: اَلْجُمَيْل) is an abandoned village in north-east Qatar located in the municipality of Al Shamal. It was an important town in the northern peninsula prior to the 21st century.

Nearby settlements include Ruwayda to the south-west and Yusufiyah and Abu Dhalouf to the north.

== Etymology ==
Two main explanations exist for the town's name. The first states that the name comes from the Arabic word jameel, which means "beautiful"; a reference to the trees that grow in the area year-round. The other theory states that the name is diminutive of the Arabic word for "camel".

Various alternative transliterations of the name are used, such as Al Jemail, Al Jamil, Lumail, and Yamail.

== History ==
According to tradition, members of the Al Hassan branch of the Al Muhannadi tribal confederation settled in Al Jumail in the mid 18th century. Before settling in Al Jumail, the Al Hassan clan and other branches of the Al Muhannadi confederation had initially established themselves in Al Khor. Over time, the group relocated north to Al Jumail, where they built homes and a defensive wall around the village. Several other families accompanied them, including Musnad bin Saad, ancestor of the Al Musnad family, as well as Mohammed bin Amir Al Humaidi and Salih bin Amir. These families established stone fish traps (locally known as masakir) along the coastline.

The foundations of the wall built by Isa bin Salman Al Hassan Al Muhannadi remain standing to this day. He is also credited with constructing a large masakir in Al Jumail as an act of religious charity. After an unspecified period, the Al Hassan family returned to Al Khor.

In the 1820s, George Barnes Brucks was tasked with preparing the first British survey of the Persian Gulf. He documented Al Jumail in this survey, referring to it as "Yamale" and concisely stating that "Yamale, in lat. 26° 5' 40" N., long. 51° 14' E., is a small village."

In J.G. Lorimer's Gazetteer of the Persian Gulf written in 1908, he makes mention of Jumail, noting its location as "midway between Abu Dhalouf and Khor Hassan", and states that it is also called Yamail or Lumail. He goes on to state that there are remains of houses and a fort.

== Geography ==
Al Jumail is situated along Qatar's northern region. The coastline near Al Jumail includes various water inlets, both circular and elongated in shape. The area between Al Jumail and Ar Ru'ays is characterized by a narrowing of the coastal strip, contrasting with the wider coastal areas to the east. As part of the northern coastal plain region of Qatar, the surrounding area is notable for its flat terrain and lacks complex topographical features.

== Gallery ==
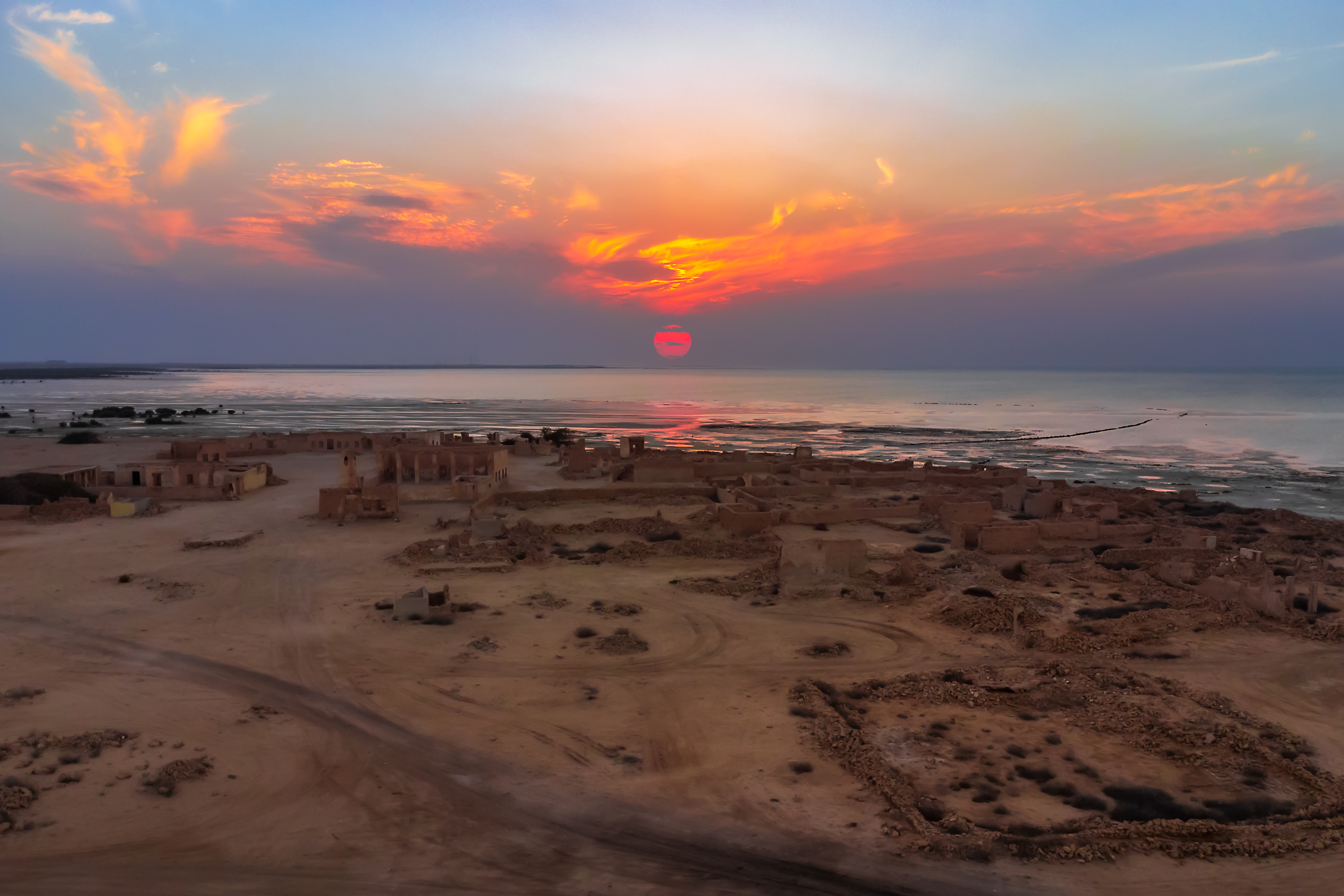
Aerial view of the village, looking west

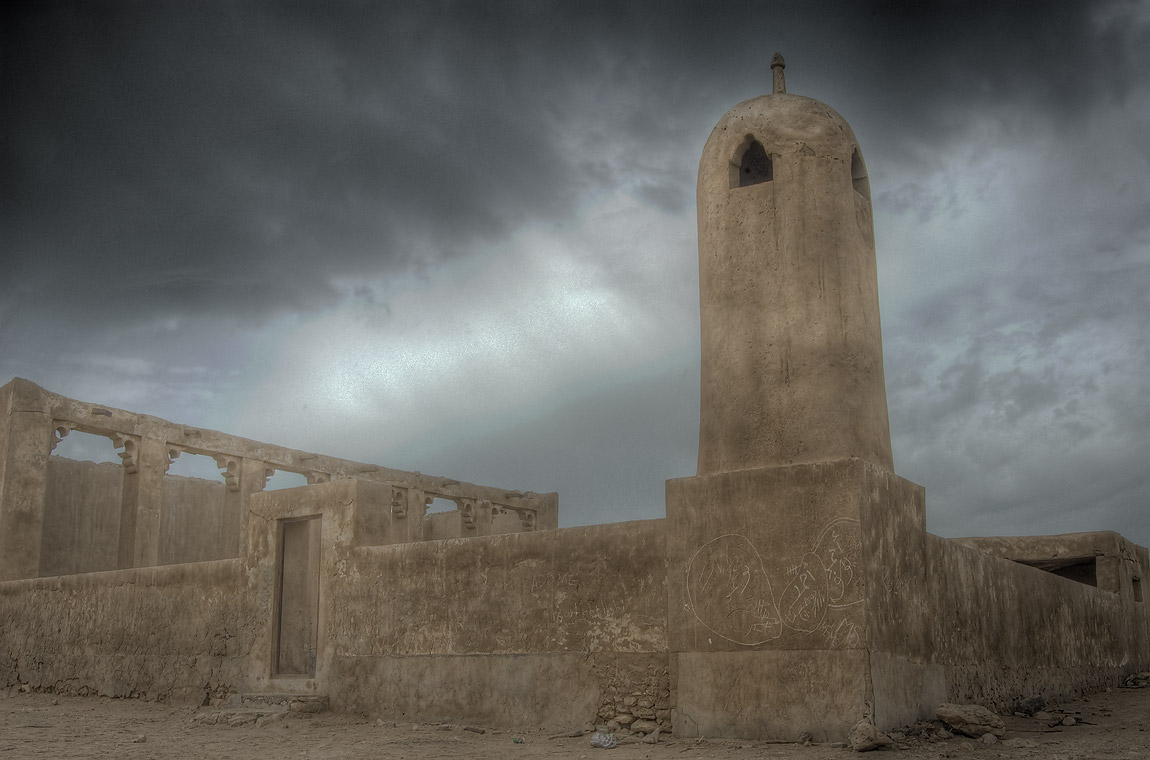
Al Hussein Mosque in Al Jumail overlooked by dark clouds.

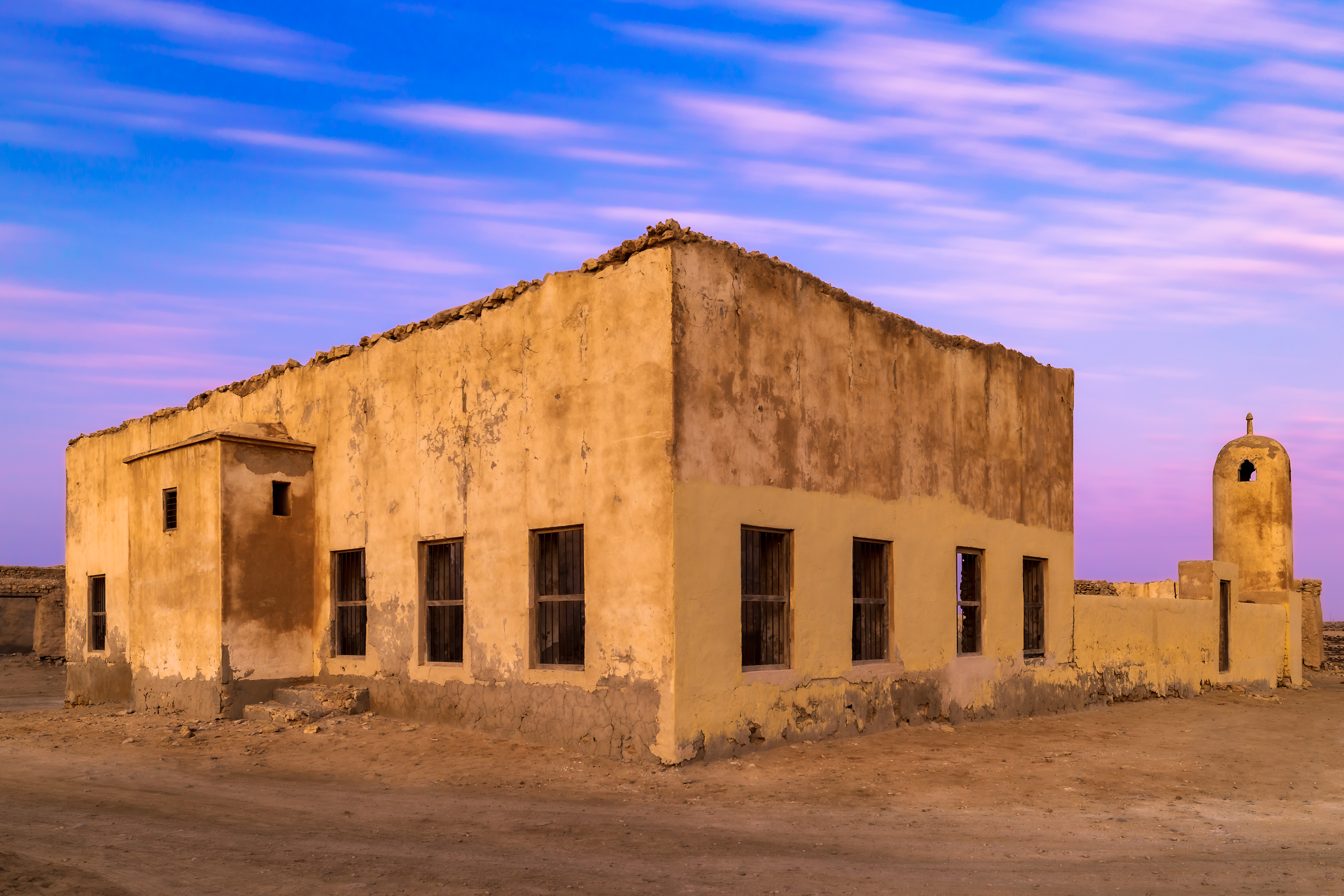
The area around Al Hussein Mosque.
