= Ruwayda =

Archaeological site in Qatar

Coordinates: 26.079098°N 51.143284°E

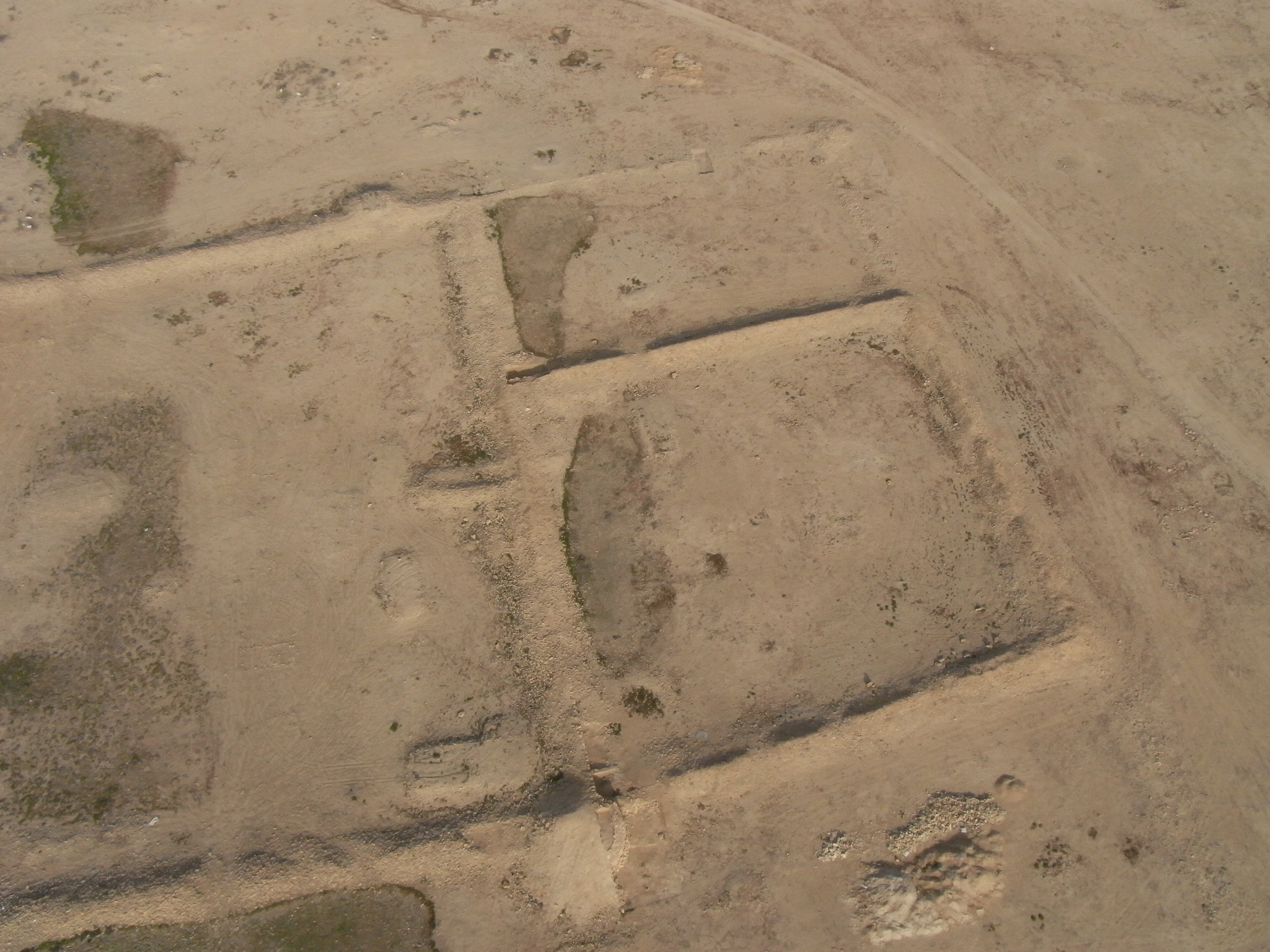
Archaeological site of Ruwayda

Ruwayda (Arabic: الرويضة) is a ruined town in northern Qatar. Extending over a length of 2.5 km along the coastline, it constitutes one of Qatar's largest archaeological sites as well as containing its largest fort. The town was likely inhabited from the 1500s to the late 1700s.

Ruwayda's early history is largely unknown. A map dating to 1563 created by Portuguese cartographer Lázaro Luís depicts Sidade de Catar, the earliest depiction of any specific settlement in Qatar. Some historians believe that it refers to Ruwayda due to the apparent Portuguese architectural style of its fort, though there remains much ambiguity as to the location's true identity.

== Etymology ==
"Ruwayda" originates from the Arabic term rawda, which refers to a depression that is rich in vegetation due to the accumulative collection of rainfall and sediment run-off. It may have been given this name due to the presence of a large garden in the town square, although, as this garden was established only after the town's initial founding, this hypothesis raises questions of the town's original name.

== Location ==
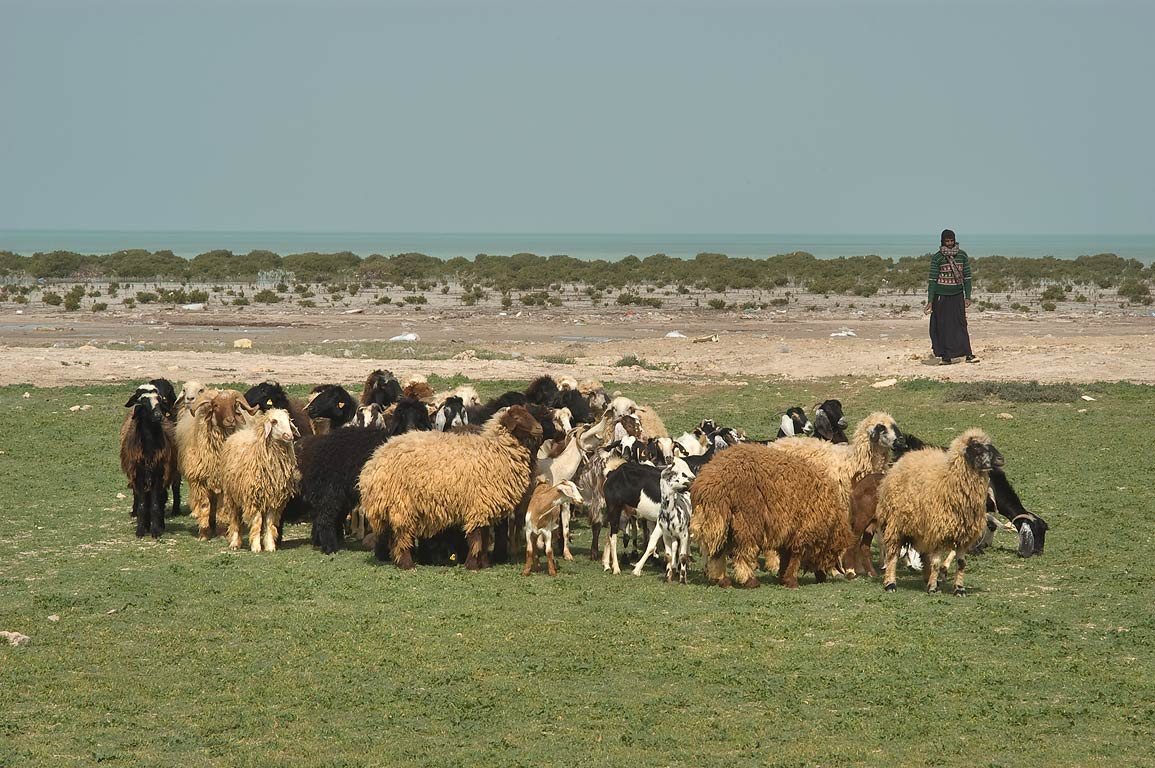
Bedouin grazing his sheep near Ruwayda archaeological site

Positioned near the north-western coastline of Qatar, the town of Ar Ru'ays is 10 km to the northeast and the abandoned village of Al Jumail is to the east. Fresh water was most likely available in the area, its extraction having been assisted by the shallow depth of the water table. The coastal waters surrounding the site are very shallow and host a plethora of white mangroves. These mangroves are considerably larger than most others found throughout the peninsula; this lends credence to the availability of fresh water.

== Written records ==
Historical accounts of Ruwayda are scarce, with only two definitively identified accounts being known. The first is a manuscript dating to the 1800s called Lam al-Shihab, which, according to Kuwaiti writer and historian Abu Hakima, refers to Ruwayda as being among the towns which were raided by the Wahhabis of Nejd in 1790. John Gordon Lorimer's 1908 encyclopedia Gazetteer of the Persian Gulf, Oman and Central Arabia is the other source which makes mention of Ruwayda, describing it as an abandoned village located 3 miles north of Al Khuwayr. He reported that, according to local sources, it was deserted around the 1760s when its inhabitants migrated to the newly founded town of Zubarah.

== Excavation history ==
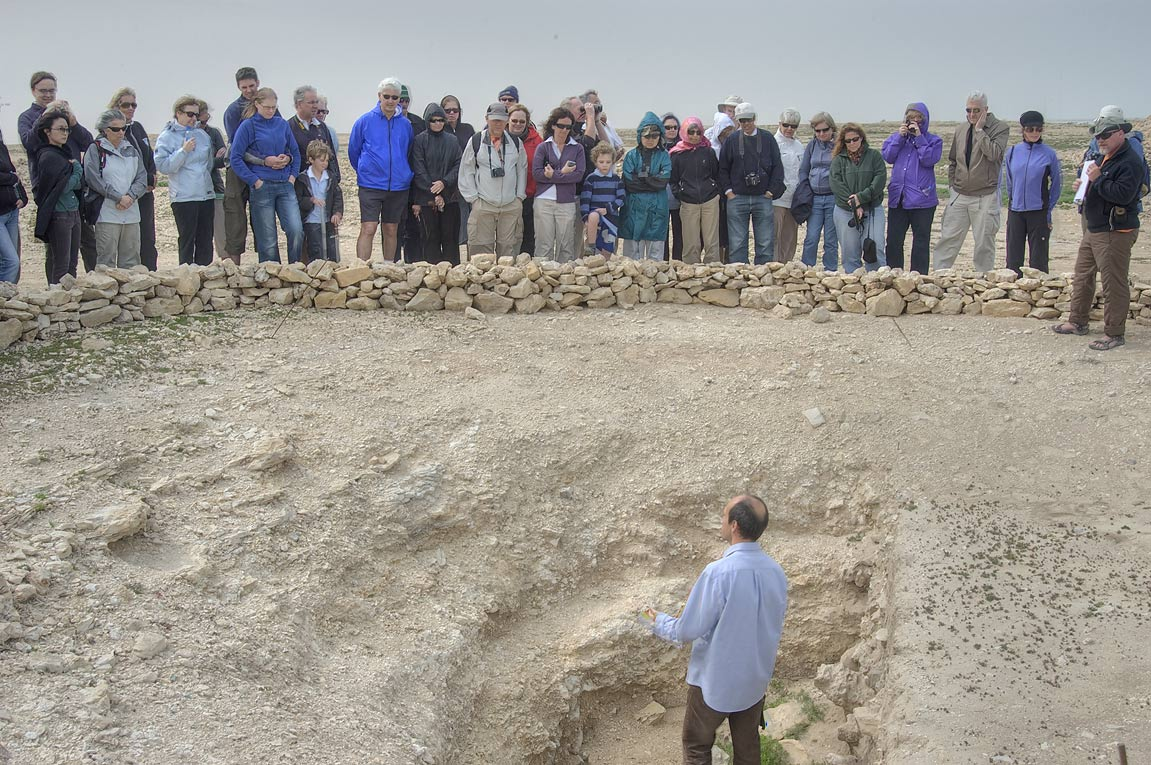
A guided tour of the excavated site by Dr Petersen, the project director of Ruwayda archaeological site, in 2010

Due to a lack of standing structures and a dearth of documentation in historical texts, Ruwayda was overlooked by the earliest archaeological expeditions launched in Qatar. It was not until 1973 that the British archaeological mission led by Beatrice De Cardi discovered the site. In her 1978 report, she noted the presence of a fort and two zones of settlement. She also claimed that she and her team unearthed artifacts dating to the 10th century, although to date no archaeologists who have excavated the site have reported similar findings.

The Qatar Museums Authority sought help from the University of Wales Trinity Saint David to make an assessment of the site in January 2009. Various artifacts and structural remnants were found, prompting the authority to direct large-scale excavations of the site from 2011 to 2014.

== Site ==
=== Fort ===
By far the most visible structure of the site is its centrally-placed fort. The fort is square in shape and has a rounded tower. It has two complexes and an outer wall covering an area of 2.25 hectares. The joint Qatar Museums Authority-University of Wales Trinity Saint David Archaeological Mission ascribed three phases of construction to the fort. Phase 1 marked the fort's original construction. It was likely deserted for a brief period of time before phase 2 witnessed the reconstruction of the fort, marking the peak of the fort's area. In phase 3, the fort was significantly downgraded.

A residential quarter, a garden, two wells and a section containing the remains of what was likely an animal pen are found in the two complexes. Some of these features were added in phase 2.

Dating back to the 16th century, there is debate over who constructed the fort, with the two main contenders being the Portuguese and the Ottomans. Construction methods of the fort appear to resemble Portuguese forts at the time, bearing little resemblance to Ottoman forts. Archaeologist Andrew Petersen, who was a key figure in the excavation team from 2011 to 2014, also speculated that it was the Portuguese who were responsible for building the fort. Petersen alluded to the lavish and grandiose scale of the fort, pointing out its functional limitations which were not present in Ottoman forts of that period. He also hypothesized that, after being abandoned by the Portuguese, it was rediscovered by Kuwaiti Bedouin tribes in the 1700s who refurbished the fort to protect them from attacks.

=== Artifacts ===
In 2013, researchers supported by Qatar Museums unveiled a sculpted plaque measuring around 5 centimeters long and crafted from bone. The plaque depicts a full Arabian oryx, which is currently a protected species and the national animal of Qatar. Experts have determined that the creation of this carving dates back approximately 300 years. Notably, a fastening at the rear suggests its potential dual use as either a brooch or furniture ornamentation.

=== Mosques ===
Situated on the seafront north of the fort is a mosque, which was uncovered from 2011 to 2013. This mosque is thought to have been built in the 1700s. Another structure west of the fort that is yet to be excavated is also purported to be a mosque.

=== Warehouse ===
A structure dubbed the warehouse comprises eight adjacent rooms. Few artifacts were recovered from the premises, although a date press (madbasa) was uncovered.

=== Tomb ===
Roughly 500 meters eastward from the fort is a tomb. Originally, the site accommodated a midden, but this midden was eventually converted into a raised entrance once a small rectangular building was built next to it. Structural evidence indicates that it is likely this building did not have a roof. It is not known who was buried in the tomb.

=== Workshop ===
Large quantities of bitumen, pottery, glass, metalwork and marine shells have been found in an excavated structure known as the workshop. A tentative description of this structure offered by the joint Qatar Museums Authority-University of Wales Trinity Saint David team is that it previously served as a boat repair shop.

== Bibliography ==
- Andrew Petersen; Faisal Abdullah Al-Naimi; Tony Grey; Ifan Edwards; Austin Hill; Hannah Russ; Dee Williams (2016). "Ruwayda: an historic urban settlement in north Qatar". Post-Medieval Archaeology. 50 (2): 321–349. doi:10.1080/00794236.2016.1229093.
