= Abu Dhalouf =

Abu Dhalouf أبو ظلوف
- Town
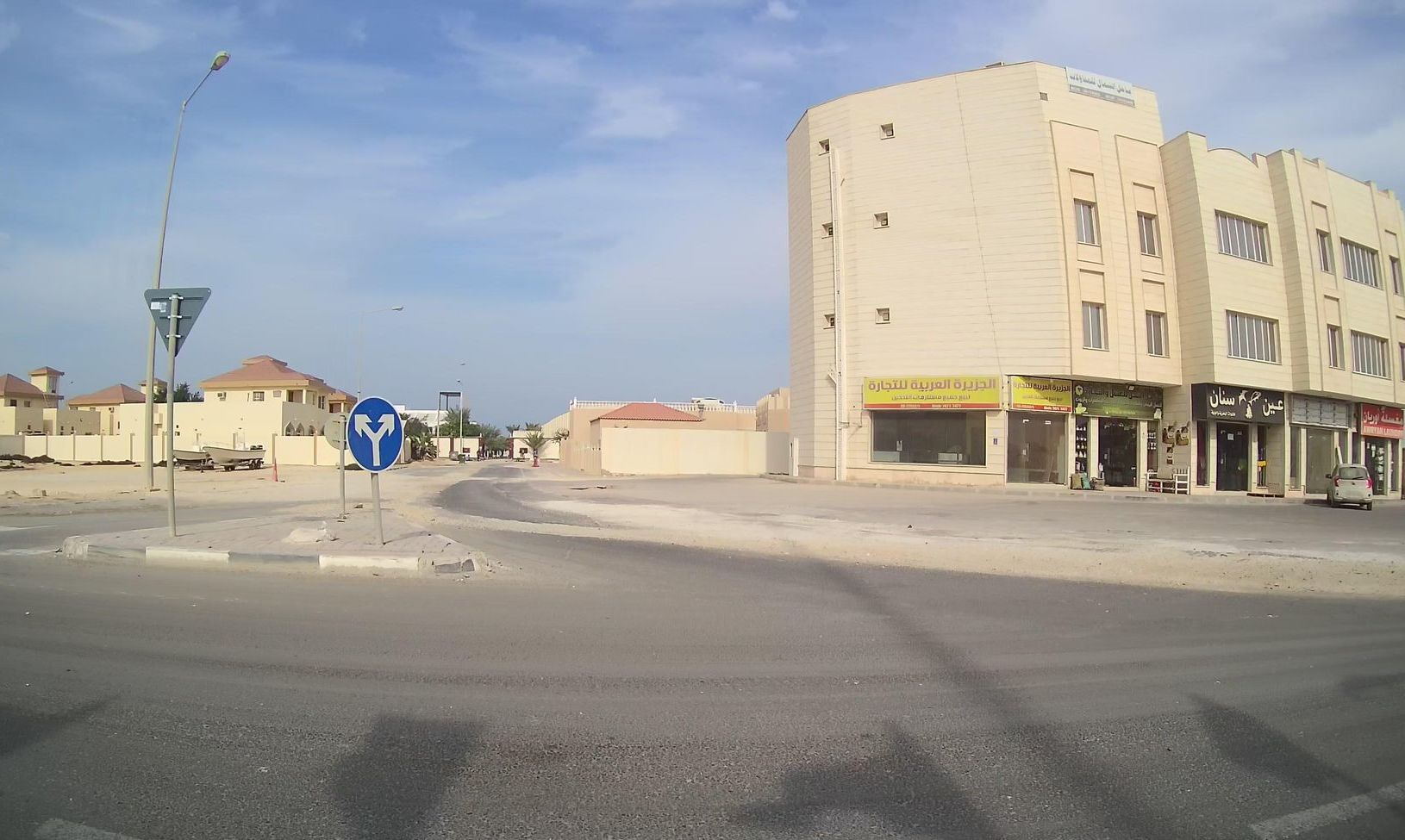
- Aba Dalouf Street in Abu Dhalouf

- Location in Qatar
- Coordinates: 26°7′25″N 51°10′0″E
- Country: Qatar
- Municipality: Al Shamal
- Zone: Zone 78
- District no.: 396

Area
  - Total: 2.0 sq mi (5.2 km^{2})

Abu Dhalouf (Arabic: أبو ظلوف, romanized: Abū Ḑalūf) is a town on the north coast of Qatar, in the municipality of Al Shamal. It was demarcated in 1988 and is bounded by Madinat ash Shamal to the immediate east, with Ar-Ruʼays to the immediate east of Madinat ash Shamal.

== Etymology ==
In Arabic, abu means "father" and, in this context, is used to describe an area with a distinct feature. "Dhalouf" is derived from the Arabic term dhalfa, which refers to the curved ends of saddles used for camel riding. The area was said to be named thus because of a prominent hill that resembled the end of a saddle.

Alternative transliterations of the name are Abu Dhaluf, Abū Ḑalūf, Abu Dhuluf, and Abū Z̧ulūf.

== History ==
=== Establishment ===
According to oral traditions, Abu Dhalouf was settled by the Al Mannai tribe after they left the nearby settlement of Yusufiyah, where they had earlier constructed a fortress known as Qal'at Al Yusufiyah. That fort, built in 1738, was located west of Ar Ru'ays and featured four towers, three round and one rectangular, according to archaeological traces. It was used for protection against both land and sea raids.

Upon relocating to Abu Dhalouf, the Al Mannai constructed a new defensive fort, commonly referred to as Qal'at Abu Dhalouf or Qal'at Al Mannai. The fort was positioned on the southwestern edge of the village and had four prominent towers, one on each corner. According to oral testimony, the fort included a large central chamber used as a shelter for the women of the Al Mannai during times of attack, while the men took defensive positions in the towers. The fort had two gates, one facing north and the other south. By the mid-20th century, the fort had begun to fall into disrepair. Archaeological remnants of the northern gate reportedly survived into the 1970s.

=== 19th century ===
In the 1820s, George Barnes Brucks was tasked with preparing the first British survey of the Persian Gulf. He wrote down the following notes about Abu Dhalouf, which he referred to as Boodeshoof:

"Boodeshoof, in lat. 26° 7' 50' N., long. 51° 16' E., is on the point nearly opposite Ras Reccan, and is subject to Bahrein, having about fifty men of the Abookara Tribe, mostly fishermen."

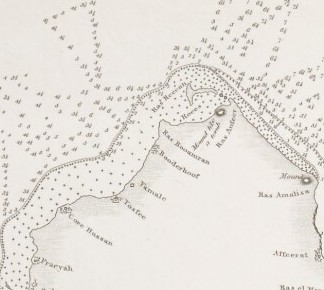
Abu Dhalouf as Boodeshoof in an 1824 map of the Qatar Peninsula based upon Brucks' research.

=== 20th century ===
Captain Francis Prideaux, who was the British political resident in Bahrain, remarked in 1906 that, although Al Bidda was firmly under Al Thani-rule, the tribes of northern settlements, including Abu Dhalouf, did not pay tribute to the sheikh Jassim bin Mohammed Al Thani, nor did they consider themselves subjects of his. After investigating an act of piracy that took place off Abu Dhalouf, Prideaux learned the tribespeople of the village pledged their allegiance to the sheikh of Bahrain instead, as stated 80 years earlier by Brucks.

J. G. Lorimer's Gazetteer of the Persian Gulf gives an account of Abu Dhalouf in 1908:

A village on the north-west coast of the Qatar Promontory, near its tip and 1 or 2 miles south-west of Ar Ru'ays. It is difficult of approach from seaward being fronted by a reef 2 1/2 miles broad which is nearly dry at low water. The inhabitants are about 70 families of the Manan'ah [Al Mannai] tribe owning 20 pearl boats [manned by 200 men], 5 other sea-going vessels and 10 fishing boats. Their drinking water is from the well of Umm Dha'an, about 1 1/2 miles inland. Camels here number 30.

Reiterating details present in G. B. Brucks' earlier report, Lorimer also stated that prior to 1856, the village was inhabited by about 50 men of the Bu Kuwara (Kuwari) tribe.

During anthropological fieldwork conducted in 1950, an estimated 200 tents belonging to the Al Mannai tribe were recorded in the area.

== Geography ==
Abu Dhalouf is on the western side of Qatar's northern coast. The line connecting Abu Dhalouf and Al Mafjar serves as a demarcation between the coastal plain areas to the north and the interior plains to the south, the latter area being characterized by a gradual widening to the south of this line.

== Landmarks ==
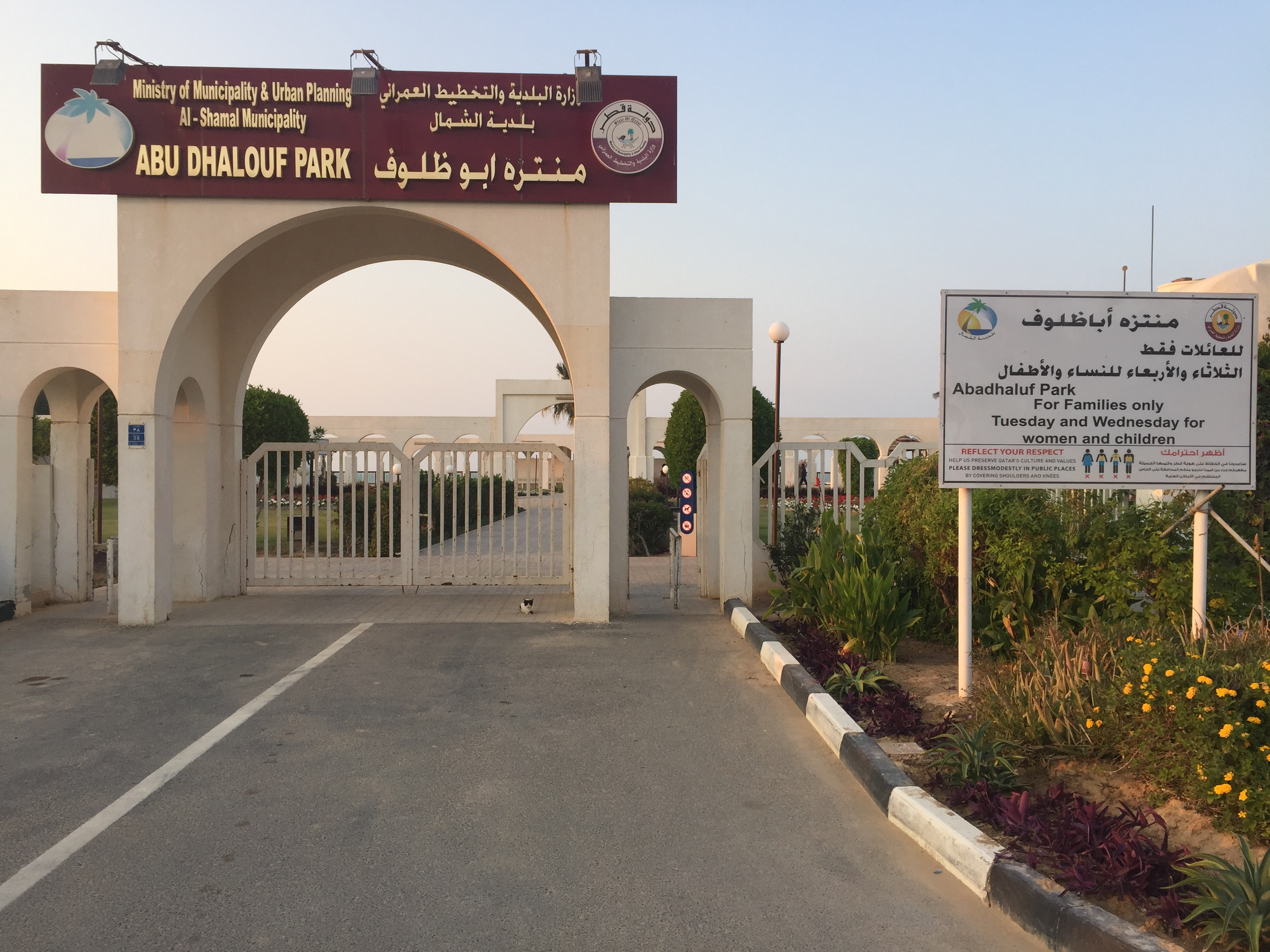
Entrance to Abu Dhalouf Park

Many historic mosques exist in the town. Among them is Bahar Mosque, which was opened in 1940 and has since been restored by Qatar Museums.

One of the most popular attractions in the town is Abu Dhalouf Park. It is situated along the Abu Dhalouf Beach, providing a vantage point of the Persian Gulf, and is also near the town center. The park draws thousands of visitors every year from elsewhere in the north and from Doha. In 2016, it was reported that several locals had lodged complaints stating that the park had fallen into disrepair. They claimed that the landscaping and children's playground equipment were deteriorating, and that the park lacked suitable lighting at night. Thus, in April 2016, the Ministry of Municipality and Environment began a QR 12.5 million renovation that spanned the park's 17,000 m^{2} (180,000 sq ft) area.

== Education ==
The settlement's first formal school was opened in 1957.
