= Al Mannai =

Arab tribe

The Al Mannai (Arabic: المناعي) tribe (plural: Al Mananea, AlMannaei (Arabic: المنانعة)) is an Arab tribe, based primarily in the Arab states of the Persian Gulf tribe. In Bahrain, the traditional home of the tribe has been Galali village. Al Mannai family in Bahrain are known to be involved in natural pearl trade. The history of the Al-Mannai Family in the field of trading goes back to 1824 when Mr. Salem Bin Darwish Al Mannai, the head of the dam family established the pearl trading business in Bahrain.

Al Mannai tribes are located in the whole Persian Gulf area, especially in Qatar and Bahrain. This is demonstrated by the establishment of one of the largest corporations in Qatar, the Mannai Corporation, is involved in several industries. Its subsidiary entities are extended worldwide and has bases in international locations.

Al Mannai today has many known tribes, such as:

- Al-Binhindi
- Al-Badeed
- Al-Binejmy
- Al-Hashel
- Al-Salam
- Al-Bughadeer
- Al-Ibrahim
- Al-Najam
- Al-Salah
- Al-Hamad
- Al-Khamis
- Al-Najim
- Al-Rumul

The Mannai family brought out other family names such as Attiyah (Arabic: عطية).

The mother of Hamad bin Khalifa Al Thani, the former Emir of Qatar, is from the Attiyah family.

In Qatar, the Al Mannai were historically based in the village of Abu Dhalouf. J. G. Lorimer, a British historian, stated that in 1908 the village was inhabited by 70 families of the Al Mannai tribe. It was remarked by the British Political Resident 1939 that Emir Abdullah bin Jassim Al Thani's first wife was from the tribe, and that the section in Qatar had 70 to 80 fighting men and was led by Nasser bin Abdullah Al Attiyah.
