= Ras Rakan =

Northernmost point of Qatar

Coordinates: 26°11′1″N 51°12′56″E

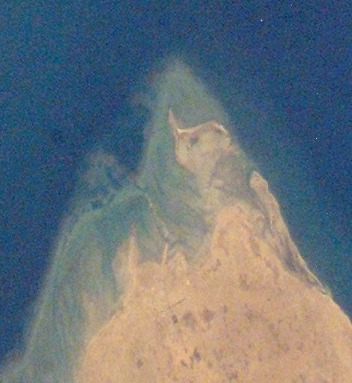
Satellite imagery of Ras Rakan in 2007

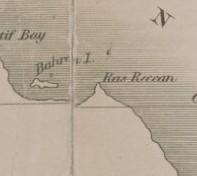
One of the earliest depictions of Ras Rakan on an 1829 map by James Silk Buckingham.

Ras Rakan (Arabic: رأس راكان) is the northernmost point in the Qatari Peninsula and is located in Al Shamal. It is the north-western point of an islet called Jazirat Ras Rakan, but as the channel between this islet and the mainland is not passable for boats, Jazirat Ras Rakan may be regarded as forming the northern extremity of the promontory.

== Location ==
The islet is nearly 2.4 km (1.5 mi) from the shore, and may be reached by wading through low water. The northernmost town of Qatar, Ar-Ruʼays, lies 4.0 km (2.5 mi) miles south-east from the islet. If approached from a northward direction, Ar-Ruʼays becomes visible before Ras Rakan is spotted.

== Description ==
Jazirat Ras Rakan is a very low, T-shaped islet, with tufts of grass on it. There are some small mangroves on the southern side of it. It is nearly 3.2 km (2 mi) in length east to west, and extremely narrow. The T-head, at its western end, is 1.6 km (1 mi) long.

== Hydrology ==
In a 2010 survey of Ras Rakan's coastal waters conducted by the Qatar Statistics Authority, it was found that its average depth was 3.5 meters (11 ft) and its average pH was 7.74. The waters had a salinity of 48.18 psu, an average temperature of 19.61 °C (67.30 °F) and 4.86 mg/L of dissolved oxygen.

== Wildlife ==
Ras Rakan is one of the main hawksbill sea turtle nesting sites in Qatar.
