= Ain Mohammed =

Ain Mohammed عين محمد
- Abandoned village
- Location in Qatar
- Coordinates: 26.003756°N 51.054056°E
- Country: Qatar
- Municipality: Al Shamal
- Zone: Zone 78
- District no.: 410

Area
  - Total: 3.7 sq mi (9.6 km^{2})

Ain Mohammed (Arabic: عين محمد) is an abandoned village in northern Qatar, located in the municipality of Ash Shamal. It lies about 1.5 km southwest of the abandoned village of Freiha. To the north is a series of small hills known as Al Jebailat. The site comprises 24 structures in total, among which are two mosques and a fort.

== Etymology ==
Named after a local well, the first constituent of the village's name, ʿayn, refers to a natural source of water in Arabic. The second element, Mohammed, was the name of the individual who built the well which supplied water to the village.

== History ==
In 1908, J.G. Lorimer recorded Ain Mohammed in his Gazetteer of the Persian Gulf, giving its location as "2 miles north-east of Zubarah". He makes note of a masonry well, 3 fathoms deep, yielding indifferent water, and a ruined fort.

Based on field work carried out by anthropologists in Qatar in the 1950s, the main tribe in the area of Ain Mohammed were the Al Mujedem branch of the Al Naim tribe.

Archaeologists have concluded that, due to the building materials used and subtle structural differences, the village was originally constructed in three distinct phases.

== Archaeology ==
Rock carvings have been discovered at Ain Mohammed.

== Gallery ==
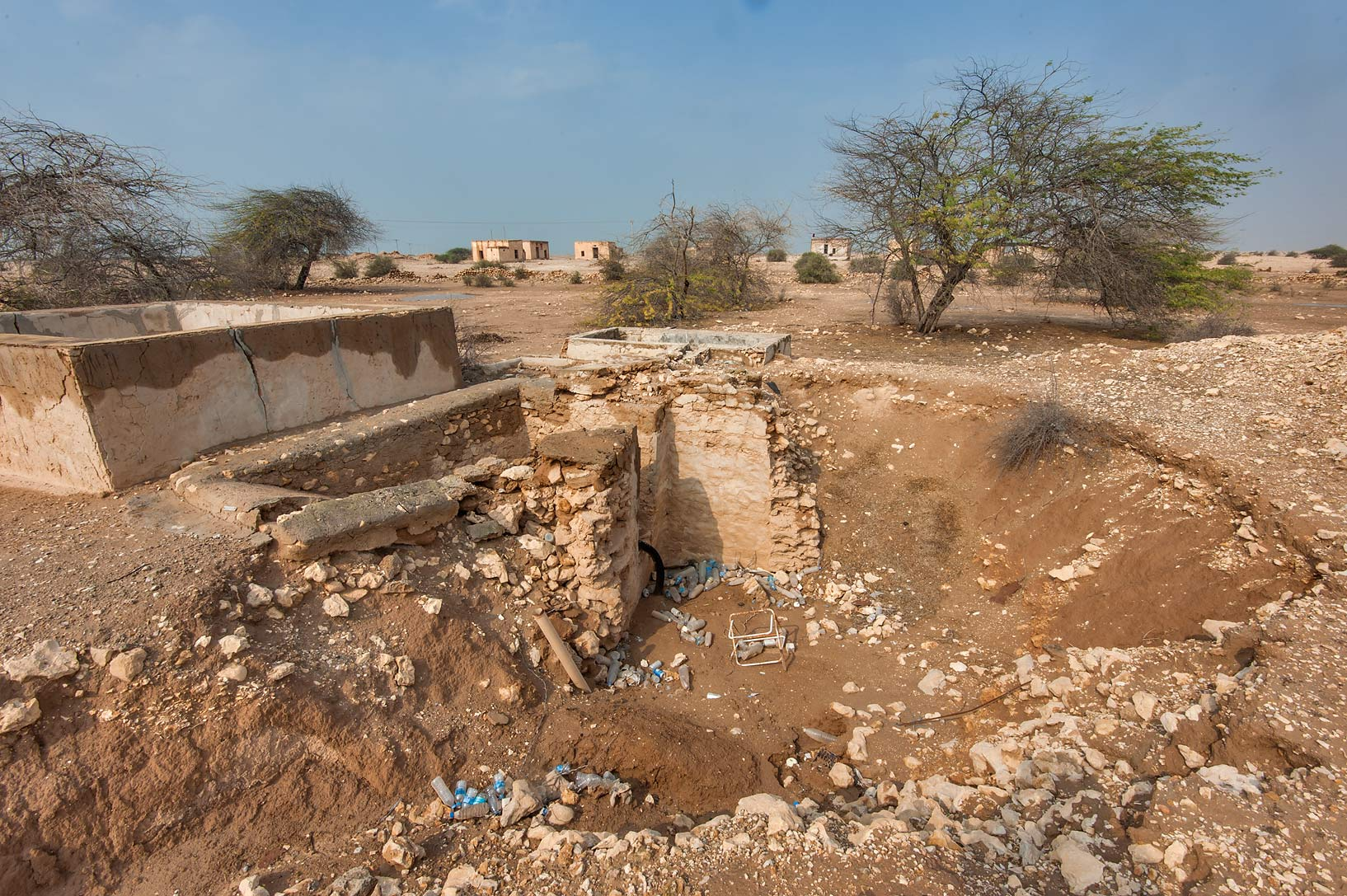
Site of the Ain Mohammed well which the village was named after

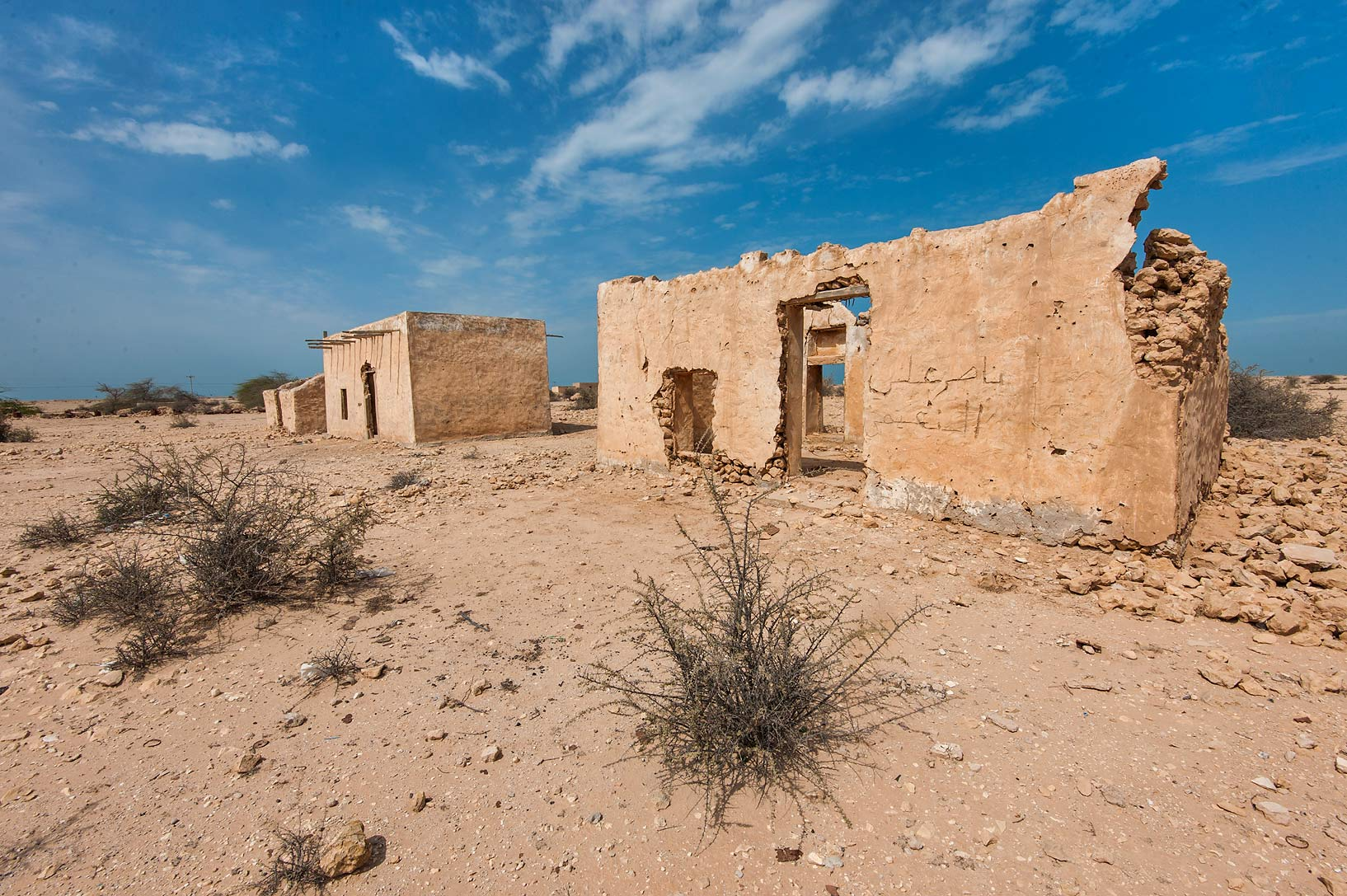
Ruined houses in Ain Mohammed

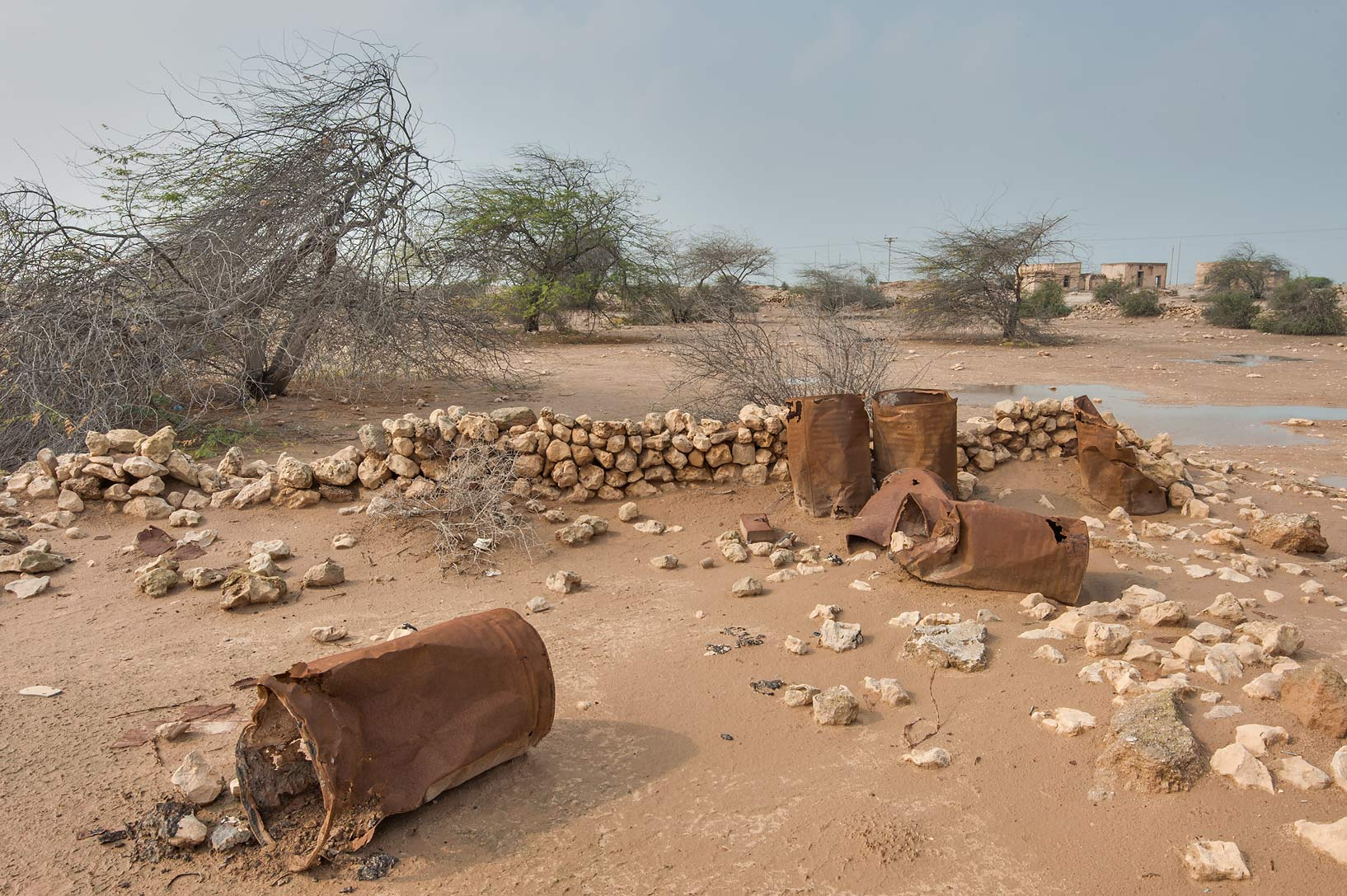
Remains of an oildrum fence for a farm in a depression in Ain Mohammed

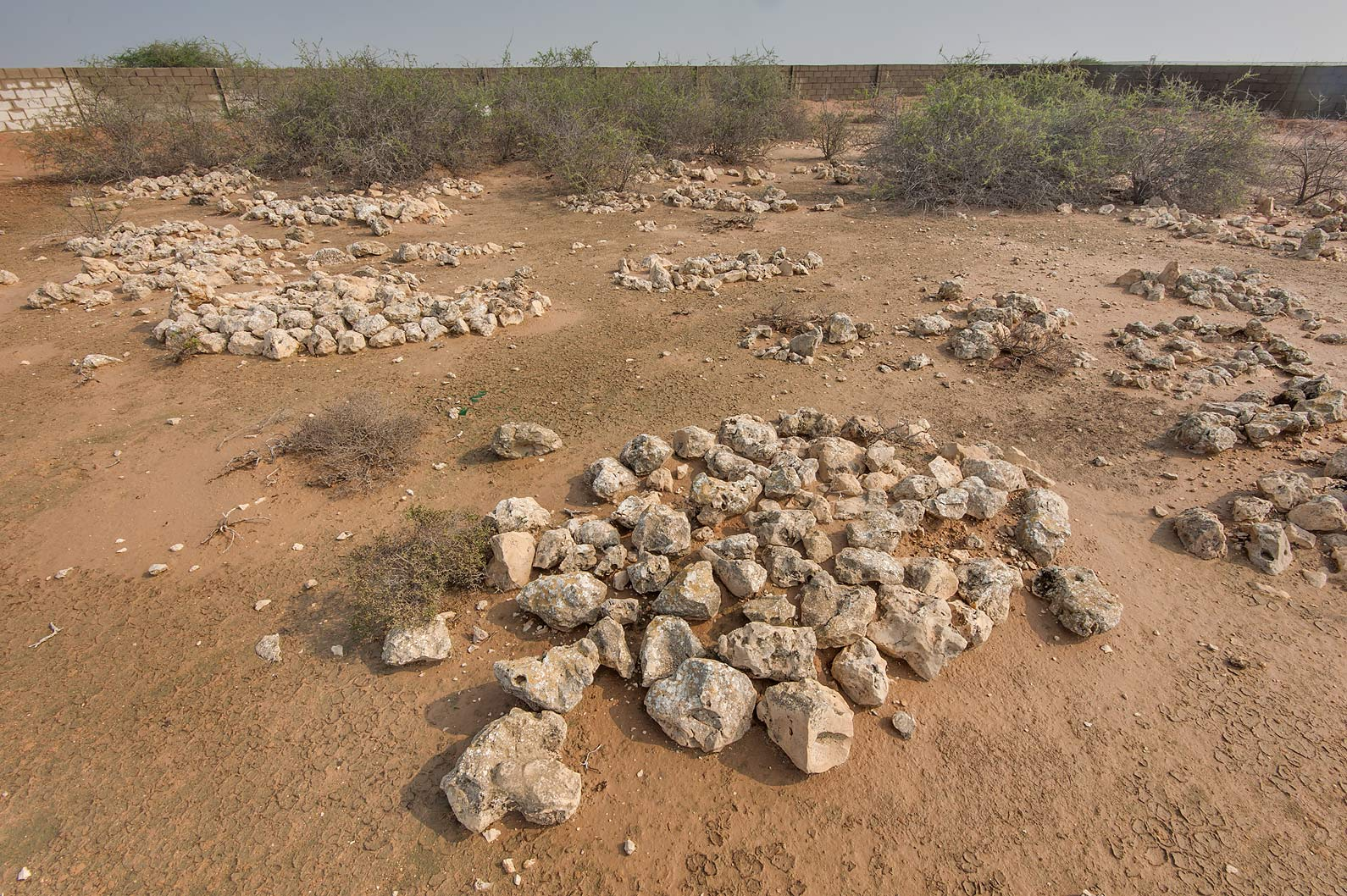
Old Ain Mohammed Cemetery.
