= List of beaches in Qatar =

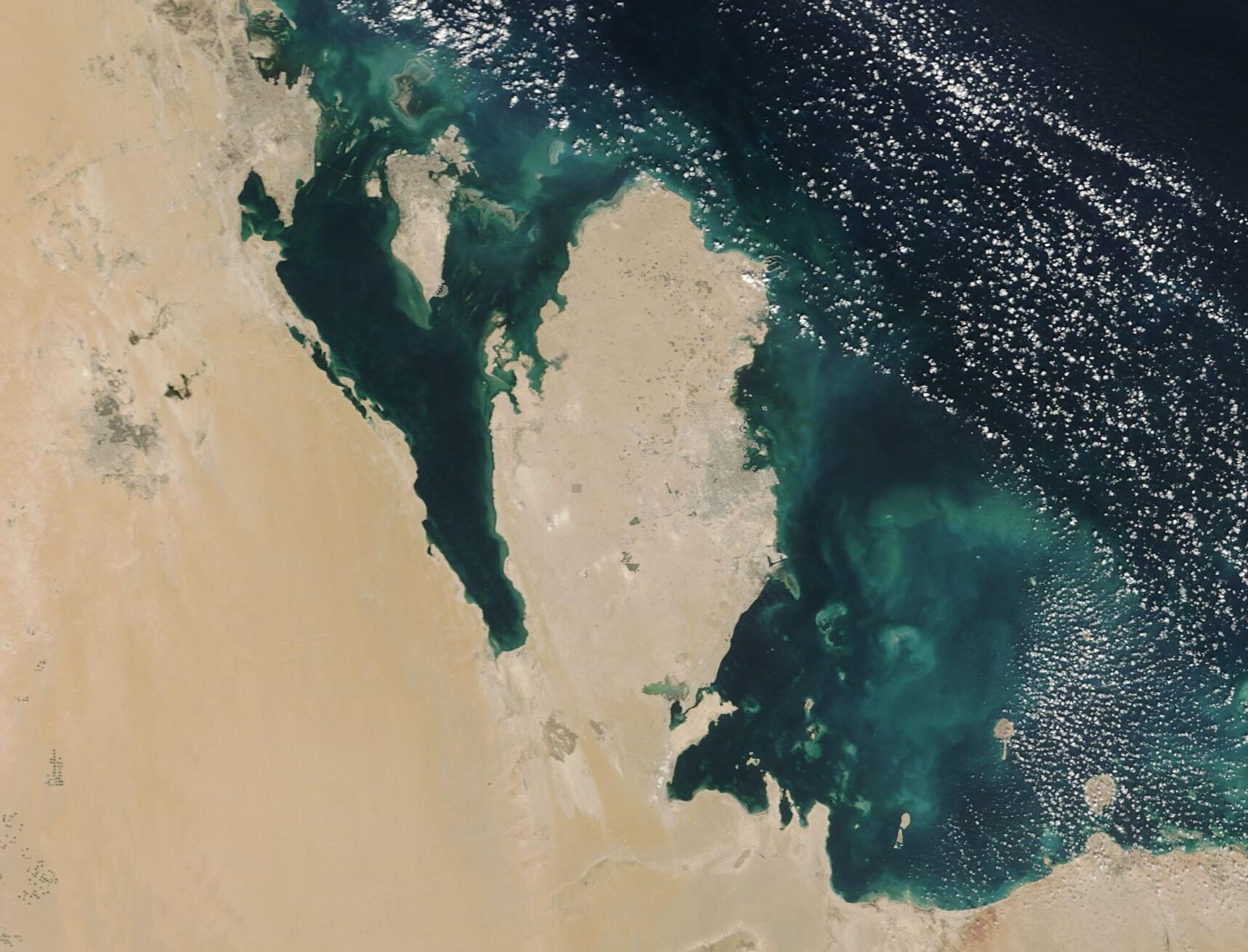
Satellite image of Qatar taken in 2022

Qatar is a peninsula with a 563 kilometre-long coastline, numerous small islets, sandbars, and reefs. It is a popular destination with tourists in the Gulf Cooperation Council.

This is a list of beaches in Qatar.

== Al Ghariya beach ==
Al Ghariyah beach is located 80 km north of Doha.

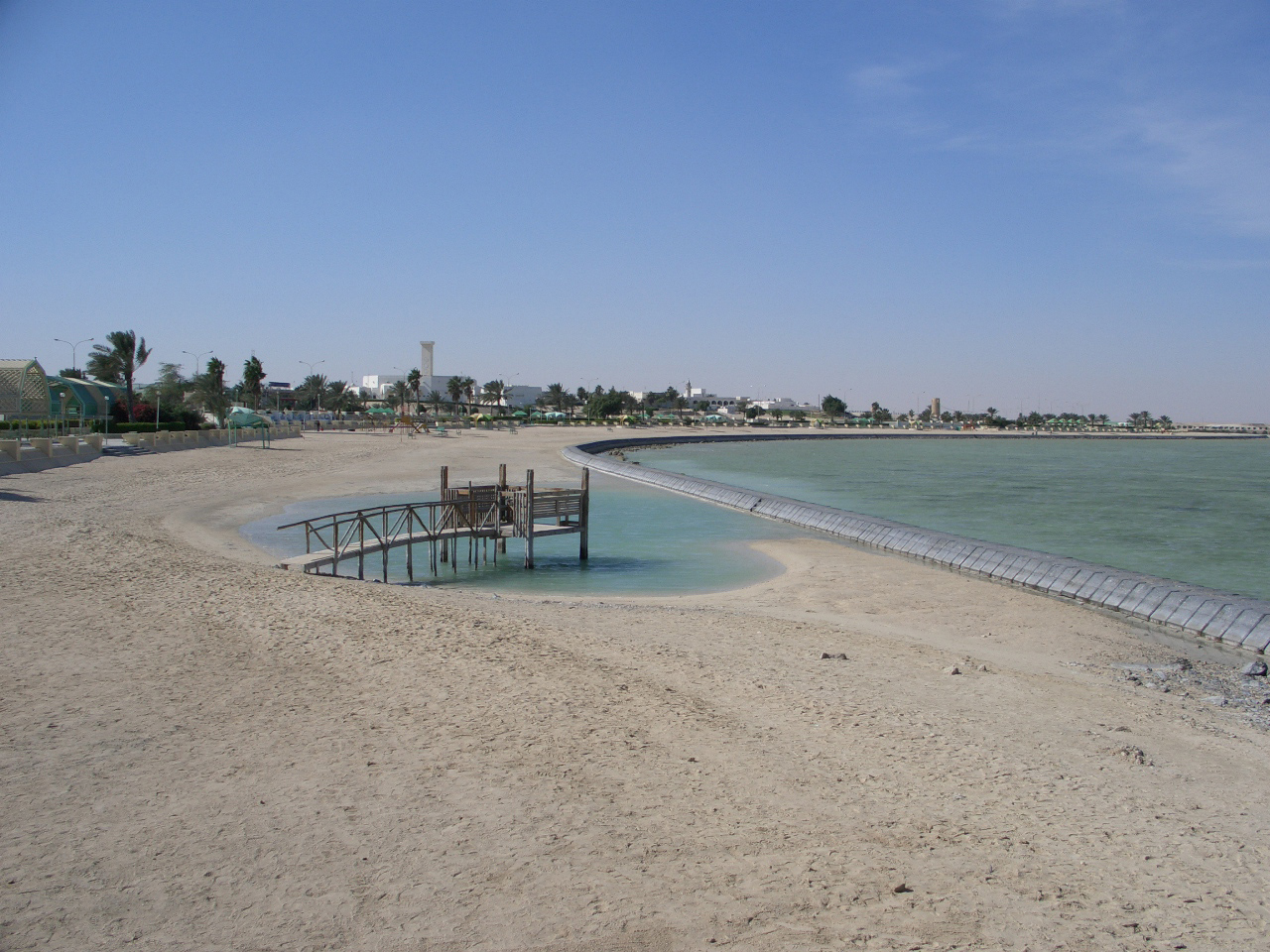
Al Farkiya Beach in Al Khor

== Khor Al Adaid ==
Khor Al Adaid is located near the Qatar–Saudi Arabia border. It is one of the most popular domestic attractions in the country.

== Dukhan beach ==
80 km West of Doha, Dukhan is the centre of Qatar’s onshore oil industry and at the beginning of the 20th century had the only aircraft landing strip in the country.

== Fuwairit beach ==
Located 80 km north of Doha, Fuwairit beach has cliffs bordering a fine sandy bay with strange shapes in the rock face.

== Zubarah beach ==
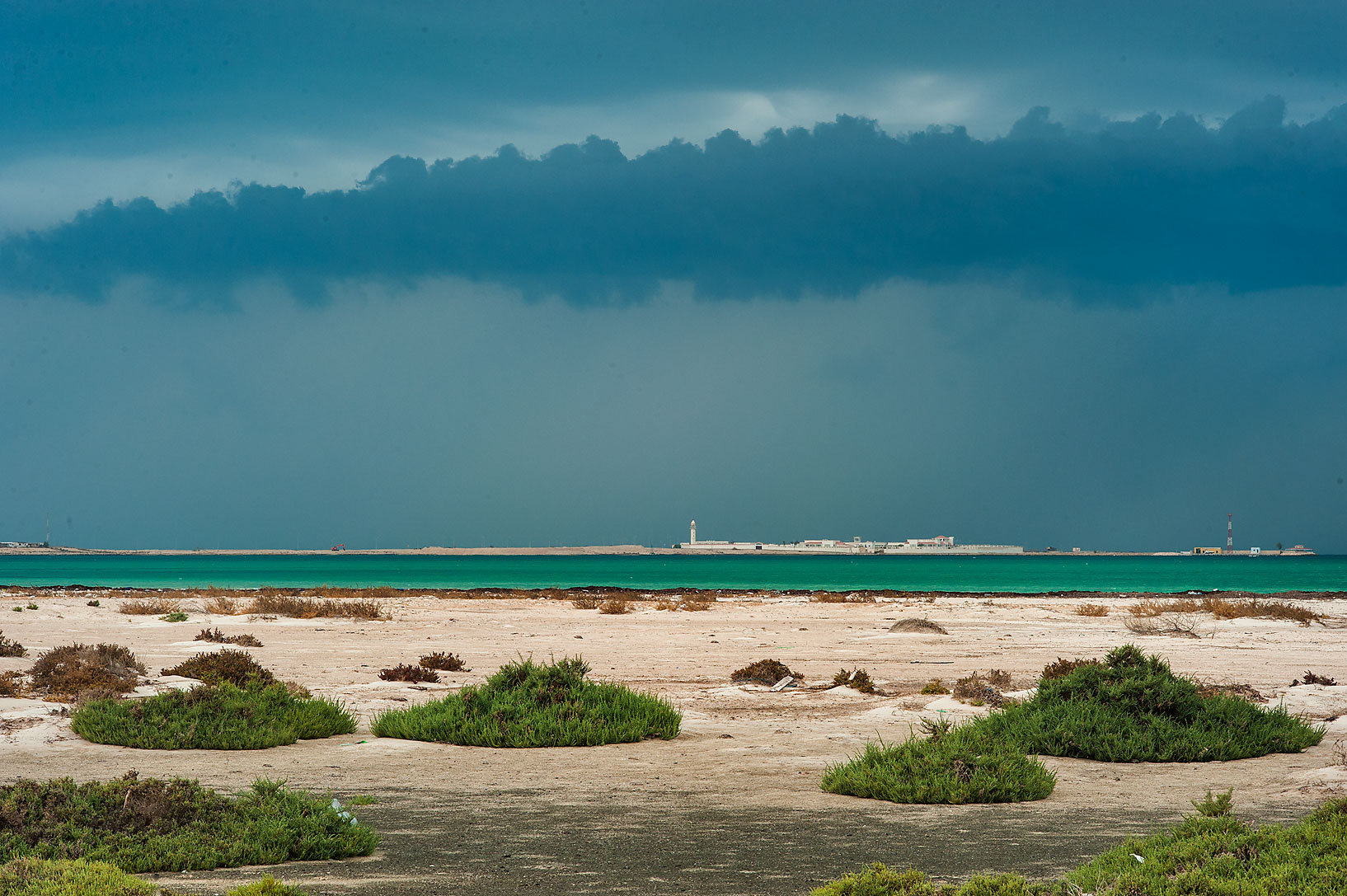
Zubarah Beach on a cloudy day

Zubarah beach is located near the Zubarah archaeological site, but is open only to those on guided tours.

== Ras Abrouq beach ==
The road to the Ras Abrouq beach is 70 km west of Doha. Ras Abrouq is also known as (Bir Zekreet), it is a favourite beach spot for weekend campers in Qatar.

== Umm Bab beach ==
90 km west of Doha, Umm Bab beach is also known as “Al Kharaij Beach” and “Palm Tree Beach” because of the small cluster of palms at the end of the road alongside the small breakwater.

== Maroona beach ==
Maroona beach is located 80 km north of Doha.

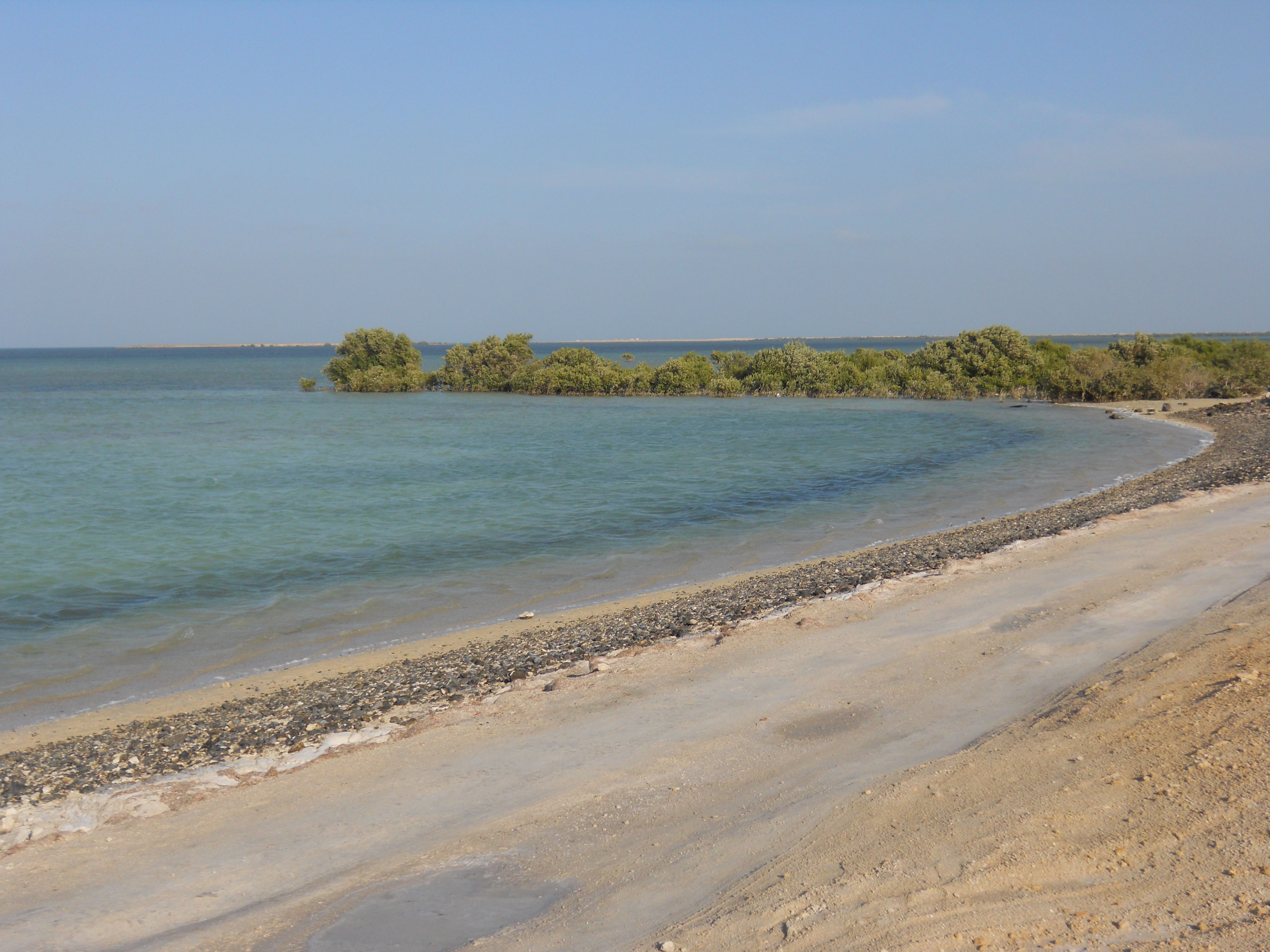
Al Thakhira beach

== Al Thakhira beach ==
Al Thakhira is town with a nearby beach and island with mangroves.

== Al Farkiya Beach ==
Al Farkiya Beach is located on Al Khor Town Road in Al Khor and offers many facilities for visitors, including a garden.

== Simaisma Family Beach ==
As its name suggests, the Simaisma Family Beach in Simaisma beach is family-oriented. It is located in the north side of Doha.

== Al Wakra Beach ==
Al Wakra, the village is situated 10 km south of Doha, and the beach is about 15 km southeast of the village center. The family beach is known for mangroves and little fishes.

== Sealine Beach ==
Sealine Beach is located in Mesaieed, approximately 36 kilometres south of the capital, Doha. Sealine Beach is a popular spot for fishing and camping, especially during the winter season.

== Dukhan Beach ==
Dukhan Beach is located in Dukhan, approximately 80 kilometres west of the capital, Doha. Dukhan Beach is known for surfing, swimming and for spotting marine life.

== Katara Beach ==
Katara Beach is located in Katara Cultural Village in Doha. Katara beach offers a selection of watersport activities. On weekdays, the beach is open from 9:30 am to sunset, while on the weekend it is open till 9:30pm.

== See also ==
- List of protected areas of Qatar
- List of beaches
- List of beaches in Bahrain
