= Jassim bin Mohammed Al Thani =

Emir of Qatar from 1878 to 1913

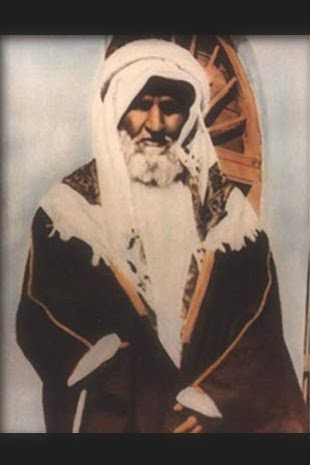
- 1882 portrait

Emir of Qatar
- Reign: 18 December 1878 – 17 July 1913
- Predecessor: Mohammed bin Thani
- Successor: Ahmed bin Muhammed Al Thani (Note: Ahmed ruled from his brother's abdication to his death (1898–1905)); Abdullah bin Jassim Al Thani (from 1913)
- Born: c. 1825; Fuwayrit, Qatar
- Died: 17 July 1913 (aged 87–88); Lusail, Qatar
- Burial: Lusail Cemetery
- Issue: Abdullah bin Jassim Al Thani
- House: Thani
- Father: Mohammed bin Thani
- Religion: Islam

Styles of The Emir of Qatar
- Reference style: His Highness
- Spoken style: Your Highness
- Alternative style: Sheikh

Jassim bin Mohammed Al Thani (Arabic: جاسم بن محمد آل ثاني; also known as "The Founder"; c. 1825 – 17 July 1913), was the founder of the State of Qatar.

== Early life ==
Jassim bin Mohammed Al Thani was born around 1825. Raised in Fuwayrit, Qatar, Jassim claimed to be descended from the Tamim tribe, as he was the eldest son of Mohammed bin Thani. Al Thani acquired full capability in the management of the country's affairs during his youth and guided its policies and steered the country during a period that saw major events and changes. Jassim, as a result of engaging in politics while serving as deputy to his father, acquired political experience. He later moved to Al Bidda with his father when he was around twenty-one years old, where he emerged as a young leader.

== Governance of Qatar: 1878–1913 ==
At the local level, Al Thani sought to turn Qatar into a single unified and independent entity. Under his leadership, Qatar emerged as a coherent and stable country. He adopted policies dealing with the two major powers competing to dominate the Persian Gulf and its territories, namely the British Empire, which had started to extend its influence through the Government of India, and the Ottoman Empire, which was seeking to retain its control of the region following the demise of the Portuguese influence in the 16th century.

To address the widespread illiteracy prevalent at the time, Al Thani established traditional schools known as kuttabs. These institutions taught children reading, writing, arithmetic, and the Quran. In a related effort, Al Thani procured numerous seminal books from Egypt and India. He also funded the printing of many Islamic texts. For instance, in 1892, he provided financing to print 100 copies of Mahmud al-Alusi's book Fathul Mannan: Completion of Laying the Foundation and Response to Brothers Reconciliation and then donated those copies to Muslim academics and students. He also wrote poetry, some of which was the inspiration for a mural by Fatma Al Sharshani.

=== Battle of Mesaimeer ===
Jassim bin Mohammed played a significant role in the Battle of Mesaimeer, an armed conflict that occurred in Qatar from 2 to 4 June, 1851. The battle pitted Qatari forces, led by Mohammed bin Thani and Jassim, against the army of Faisal bin Turki, Imam of the Emirate of Nejd, during his attempt at invading Bahrain by way of Qatar. Bahraini forces under Ali bin Khalifa, though nominally allied with Qatar, remained largely uninvolved in the actual fighting and later retreated.

On 3 June –which saw the most intense fighting– Jassim led the Qatari forces into battle and launched a decisive attack against Faisal's army who was encamped in Mesaimeer. The engagement involved both cavalry and infantry, with Jassim reportedly demonstrating considerable personal bravery. According to local accounts, he engaged in single combat with one of Faisal's chief lieutenants, Fares Al Otaibi, ultimately defeating him. Faisal's forces reportedly suffered another defeat on 4 June, forcing them to retreat to their camp. Shortly after the final day of battle, Jassim's father, Mohammed bin Thani sent a letter to Faisal bin Turki's camp requesting peace and agreeing to be his subject, to which Faisal obliged. This act was seen as a betrayal on the part of the Bahrainis. After negotiations between the Wahhabis and Bahrainis the next month, Faisal bin Turki agreed to return dominion over Qatar to Bahrain in exchange for an annual zakat to be paid by Ali bin Khalifa.

Many years after the battle, Jassim wrote a poem commemorating the battle:

أرى مـن صروف الدهـر ما كدر الصفا وجفـن سـهر مهـوب بالنـوم ذايـل
حميـناك ـمن دوالت اإلـمام فيـصل جمـوع يقديهـا طـرى الفعايـل
نطحـنا الـسبايا ـيوم ـكرت ورودـها والشـيخ فـي مثنـاة جمعـه يخايـل
نطحـنا الـسبايا بالـسبايا ودـبرت
ودم لعتيبـي فـوق رمحـي وشـايل

— Jassim bin Mohammed Al Thani
Translation:

I see from the vicissitudes of time what has troubled the serenity,
And an eyelid, sleepless, fearful of slumber, withering.
We protected you from the changes of Imam Faisal,
Crowds led by fresh deeds.
We confronted the invaders on the day of their attack,
And the Sheikh, in the midst of his people, stands tall.
We confronted their troops and planned our moves,
And the blood of an Otaibi stained my spear, carried high.

=== Qatari–Bahraini War ===
In 1867, Bahrain launched a war against Qatar following the "Al Wakrah Incident". In the preceding incident, the Bahraini representative in Qatar confiscated property from members of the Na'im tribe. When the tribesmen protested, the agent had them arrested and imprisoned. The tribal elders appealed to Jassim bin Mohammed Al Thani for assistance, recognizing his growing influence and reputation for justice. Jassim mobilized a general levy of Qatari forces and marched on Al Wakrah. This action resulted in the expulsion of the Bahraini deputy amir, Ahmed bin Mohammed Al Khalifa, who fled by sea to northern Qatar. Al Khalifa then lured Jassim to visit Bahrain, assuring him that no ill will was harbored towards him. However, upon his arrival, he was imprisoned. Following this, Muhammad bin Khalifa assembled a naval fleet to raid Qatar, sparking the war.

Bahrain succeeded in gaining support from Abu Dhabi, as Doha and Al Wakrah have long been harbors of refuge for Omani seceders, to launch attacks on major Qatari cities in what became known as the Qatari–Bahraini War, causing significant damage. In retaliation, Qatar attacked Bahrain in 1868 in what was known as the Battle of Al Damsah, resulting in the deaths of a thousand men and the sinking of sixty ships. The aftermath of the Battle of Damsah saw the Qatari forces execute a strategic withdrawal, prompting a pursuit by Bahraini troops to the settlement of Al Wakrah. At this location, the Qatari contingent mounted a defense, successfully encircling the Bahraini forces and capturing two of their commanders. The engagement concluded with a negotiated exchange of prisoners, following which Jassim bin Mohammed returned to his seat of power in Doha.

Following the war and subsequent British mediation, Qatar was officially recognized as an independent political entity in September 1868 with the signing of a treaty between Jassim's father, Mohammed bin Thani and the British representative Lewis Pelly. Jassim wrote poems about the events leading to his imprisonment.

Despite himself being imprisoned by Muhammad bin Khalifa, Jassim lobbied for Muhammad's release from prison when British authorities arrested him following the war. He wrote to the new ruler of Bahrain, Isa bin Ali, promising to pay him a ransom for Muhammad's release: a thousand of the finest camels and ninety of the noblest horses. In one of his poems, he said:

فـــال يــا عيــال العــم فكــوا محمـــد
مــن الحبــس ال ترضــون لــه بــذالل
فعندي لكم من الخيل تسعين سابق
وألـف مـن الهجـن النجـاب اجالل
علــ ّّي يمـــين اللــه إنـــي أســوقـــها
لعــــل عـــــثرات الكــريم ُت

— Jassim bin Mohammed Al Thani
Translation:

O cousins, release Mohammed from prison
Do not be content with his humiliation
I have for you ninety racing horses
And a thousand of the finest, purebred camels
I swear by God that I will drive them
Perhaps the stumbles of the noble will be forgiven

=== Conflicts with the Ottoman Empire ===
In April 1871, the expedition sent by Midhat Pasha, the Ottoman governor of Baghdad, to Eastern Arabia arrived. In an attempt to secure a landing for Ottoman troops, the Ottomans sent an envoy bearing an Ottoman flag to Sheikh Jassim. He accepted and flew the flag, and by December of that year had authorized the Ottomans to send military equipment and 100 troops to Al Bidda. In January 1872, Qatar was formally incorporated into the Ottoman Empire as a province in Najd with Sheikh Jassim being appointed its kaymakam (sub-governor).

Sheikh Jassim took power on 18 December 1878. It was also the inception of the modern State of Qatar, achieved as a result of Sheikh Jassim's efforts that led to gaining full recognition by both powers of Qatar's independence.

Despite the disapproval of local tribes, Al Thani continued supporting Ottoman rule. However, Qatari-Ottoman relations soon stagnated, and in 1882 they suffered further setbacks when the Ottomans refused to aid Al Thani in his expedition of Abu Dhabi-occupied Khor Al Adaid. Al Thani fell out of favor with the Ottomans after they received complaints from Qataris regarding his oppressions from 1885 to 1886. In a further blow to relations, the Ottomans supported the Ottoman subject Mohammed bin Abdul Wahab who attempted to supplant Al Thani as kaymakam of Qatar in 1888.

Sheikh Jassim soon became a leading figure in the opposition against the Ottoman Empire's attempts to increase its influence in Qatar through its appointment of administrative personnel in Zubarah, Doha, Al Wakrah and Khawr al Udayd, establishment of a customs office and reinforcement of the Ottoman garrison. In early 1892, he resigned as kaymakam of Qatar and stopped paying taxes to the Ottoman Empire in August of that year.

=== Conflicts with the British Empire ===
Aside from being opposed to the Ottoman Empire's influence, Sheikh Jassim was also opposed to similar pressures from the British Empire. In 1882, in addition to closing their shops, he expelled British Indian pearl traders from Doha. He renounced his jurisdiction of Doha the same year, and members of the Bani Hajer tribe attacked the pearl traders shortly after, resulting in the merchants' withdrawal from the country and the forfeiting of their profits during that period.

At the request of Sheikh Jassim, several members of the Al Bin Ali, an Utub tribe, relocated from Bahrain to Zubarah in 1895 after renouncing their allegiance to the Bahraini emir. The Bahraini emir, fearful that Sheikh Jassim was preparing to launch an invasion, issued a warning to him and informed the political resident in Bahrain of the dispute. Upon being made aware of the proceedings, the British requested the Ottomans, who had been acting in concert with Sheikh Jassim, to abort the settlement. Much to the indignation of the Ottomans, the British sent a naval ship to Zubarah shortly after and seized seven of the Al Bin Ali's boats after the tribe's leader refused to comply with their directive. The Ottoman governor of Zubarah, under the belief that the British were infringing on Ottoman dominion, relayed the events to the Ottoman Porte, who began assembling a large army near Qatif. Sheikh Jassim also congregated a large number of boats near the coast. Subsequently, the governor of Zubarah declared Bahrain as Ottoman territory and threatened that the Porte would provide military support to Qatari tribes who were preparing to launch a naval invasion. This invoked a harsh reprisal from Britain, who, after issuing a written notice, opened fire on Zubarah's port, destroying 44 dhows. The incursion and subsequent Ottoman retreat prompted Sheikh Jassim and his army to surrender on unfavorable terms, in which he was instructed to hoist the Trucial flag at Zubarah. He was also ordered to pay 30,000 rupees.

=== Conflicts with Abu Dhabi ===
During Jassim bin Mohammed Al Thani's rule, Qatar experienced significant tensions with the neighboring Emirate of Abu Dhabi, rooted in long-standing territorial disputes and tribal rivalries along their shared border and exacerbated by the complex interplay of Ottoman and British imperial interests in the Gulf region.

Throughout the 1880s, a series of raids and counter-raids escalated tensions between Qatar and Abu Dhabi, starting with the Baynunah, Suwaihan and Al-Marsaf battles in 1881. In 1887, Jassim led an expedition into Khor Al Adaid in southern Qatar, accompanied by Ottoman troops, to assert his claim over the disputed territory. This action prompted strong British diplomatic protests and threats of military intervention from the British Political Resident, Edward Ross.

Hostilities intensified in 1888, following a series of incidents involving tribal defections and retaliatory raids. In March 1888, Jassim launched a substantial offensive against Abu Dhabi territory, resulting in significant material losses for Abu Dhabi, including the destruction of 20 villages and the capture of livestock and inhabitants. In August 1888, Abu Dhabi forces retaliated with an attack on Doha, resulting in significant Qatari casualties, including the death of Jassim's son, Ali bin Jassim (known as Jo'aan).

These events led to the Battle of Khannour in January 1889. Jassim assembled a force of between 500 and 1,000 men, supported by limited Ottoman assistance. The Qatari forces advanced into Abu Dhabi territory, capturing the strategic Khannour Fort after a twenty-day siege. Following this victory, Qatari forces conducted extensive raids across Abu Dhabi territory, reaching as far as Al Ain and Al Buraimi.

The battle and subsequent raids had significant implications for the regional balance of power. Although exact casualty figures are disputed, reports suggest that over 500 men from Abu Dhabi's forces were killed. The conflict drew the attention of British authorities and other Gulf rulers, leading to attempts at mediation by the British Political Resident in October 1889.

The aftermath of the Battle of Khannour led to further skirmishes and diplomatic maneuvering between Qatar and Abu Dhabi. In April 1889, Sheikh Zayed bin Khalifa Al Nahyan of Abu Dhabi, assisted by the rulers of Dubai and Muscat and Oman, launched a retaliatory offensive along the Qatari Peninsula and Al-Ahsa, but withdrew after warnings from Ottoman representatives in Qatar. The conflict was eventually resolved in 1893 through an agreement jointly brokered by the British and Ottomans.

=== Battle of Al Wajbah ===
In October 1892, an Ottoman army comprising approximately 200 men led by the governor of Basra, Mehmed Hafiz Pasha, was sent to Qatar in response to Sheikh Jassim's refusal to yield to the demands made by the Ottomans, including refusal to pay tax. They arrived in February 1893, with further reinforcements en route from Kuwait. Sheikh Jassim, fearing that he would face death or imprisonment, fled first to Al Daayen, and then to Al Wajbah Fort (16 km (10 mi) west of Doha) where he was accompanied by several Qatari tribes.

Mehmed sent a letter to Sheikh Jassim demanding that he disband his troops and pledge loyalty to the Ottomans. Sheikh Jassim remained adamant in his refusal to comply with Ottoman authority, and refused to meet with Mehmed himself on the basis of ill health. Instead, he appointed his brother, Ahmed bin Mohammed Al Thani, as his emissary. In March, after a month of back-and-forth parleying, Mehmed lost patience and imprisoned Ahmed and between 13 and 16 prominent Qatari tribal leaders on the Ottoman corvette Merrikh.

As a result, a military confrontation followed in March 1893 and a crucial battle broke out between the Qataris, led by Sheikh Jassim and the Ottoman soldiers. He and his troops, who were composed of several Qatari tribes, fought a major battle in which they inflicted defeat on the Ottoman troops and achieved victory. The victory was decisive, leaving the Turks no choice but to free the Qatari captives in exchange for Sheikh Jassim permitting the captured Turkish cavalry free passage by land to Hofuf, Saudi Arabia.

The battle was a turning point in Qatar's history, making it one of the most important battles in Qatar's development towards independence. The fort that Sheikh Jassim used to fend off the Ottoman soldiers in the main battle of Al Wajbah was the Al Wajbah Fort, found in the municipality of Al Rayyan.

== Abdication and later reign ==
The British attempted to intervene in the dispute between the Turkish soldiers and the Qatari tribes but found themselves unable to take up Jassim's offer to place Qatar under British protection. The Turks made their peace with Sheikh Jassim and he moved to live peacefully at Lusail, leaving the running of the country to his brother, Sheikh Ahmed bin Mohammed Al Thani. Since as early as May 1884, Shaikh Jassim had been writing to the British government that he had "resigned the government of Al Bidda", to which his brother Ahmed took charge of.

He died on the afternoon of 17 July 1913 and was buried in Lusail, a village 24 km (15 mi) north of Doha, which is found in the municipality of Al Daayen.

== Children ==
He had a total of 19 sons.

No.	Name	Position	Year of birth	Year of death
1	Fahad bin Jassim Al Thani I	None	Unknown	Died whilst young
2	Khalifa bin Jassim Al Thani	None	1851	1931
3	Thani bin Jassim Al Thani	Sheikh of Al Gharrafa	1856	1943
4	Abdulrahman bin Jassim Al Thani	Sheikh of Al Wakrah	1871	1930
5	Abdullah bin Jassim bin Mohammed Al Thani	Former Sheikh of Al Rayyan, Ruler of Qatar (1914–1940, 1948–1949)	1880	1957
6	Ali bin Jassim Al Thani I	None	Unknown	Died whilst young
7	Mohammed bin Jassim bin Mohammed Al Thani	Sheikh of Umm Salal Mohammed	1881	1971
8	Ghanim bin Jassim Al Thani	Unknown	Unknown	Unknown
9	Ali bin Jassim Al Thani II	Sheikh of Umm Salal Ali	1893	1972
10	Fahad bin Jassim Al Thani II	None	Unknown	Died whilst young
11	Fahad bin Jassim Al Thani III	Sheikh of Al Kheesa, Lusail, Rumeilah and Adba	1895	c. 1980
12	Abdulaziz bin Jassim Al Thani	Sheikh of Al Markhiya	1896	1985
13	Salman bin Jassim Al Thani	None	Unknown	Died while he was born
14	Idris bin Jassim Al Thani	None	Unknown	Died while he was born
15	Mubarak bin Jassim Al Thani	None	Unknown	Died while he was born
16	Salman bin Jassim Al Thani II	Sheikh of Dukhan	1899	1984
17	Nasser bin Jassim Al Thani	Sheikh of Nasiriya	Unknown	1978
18	Sultan bin Jassim Al Thani	Sheikh of Umm Al Amad	Unknown	1976
19	Ahmed bin Jassim Al Thani	Sheikh of Al Khor	Unknown	1995

== Notes ==
Jassim bin Mohammed Al Thani House of Thani Born: c. 1825 Died: 17 July 1913
Regnal titles
Preceded by Mohammed bin Thani	Emir of Qatar; 1878–1913	Succeeded by Abdullah bin Jassim Al Thani
