= Al Ghariyah =

Al Ghariyah الغارية
- Village
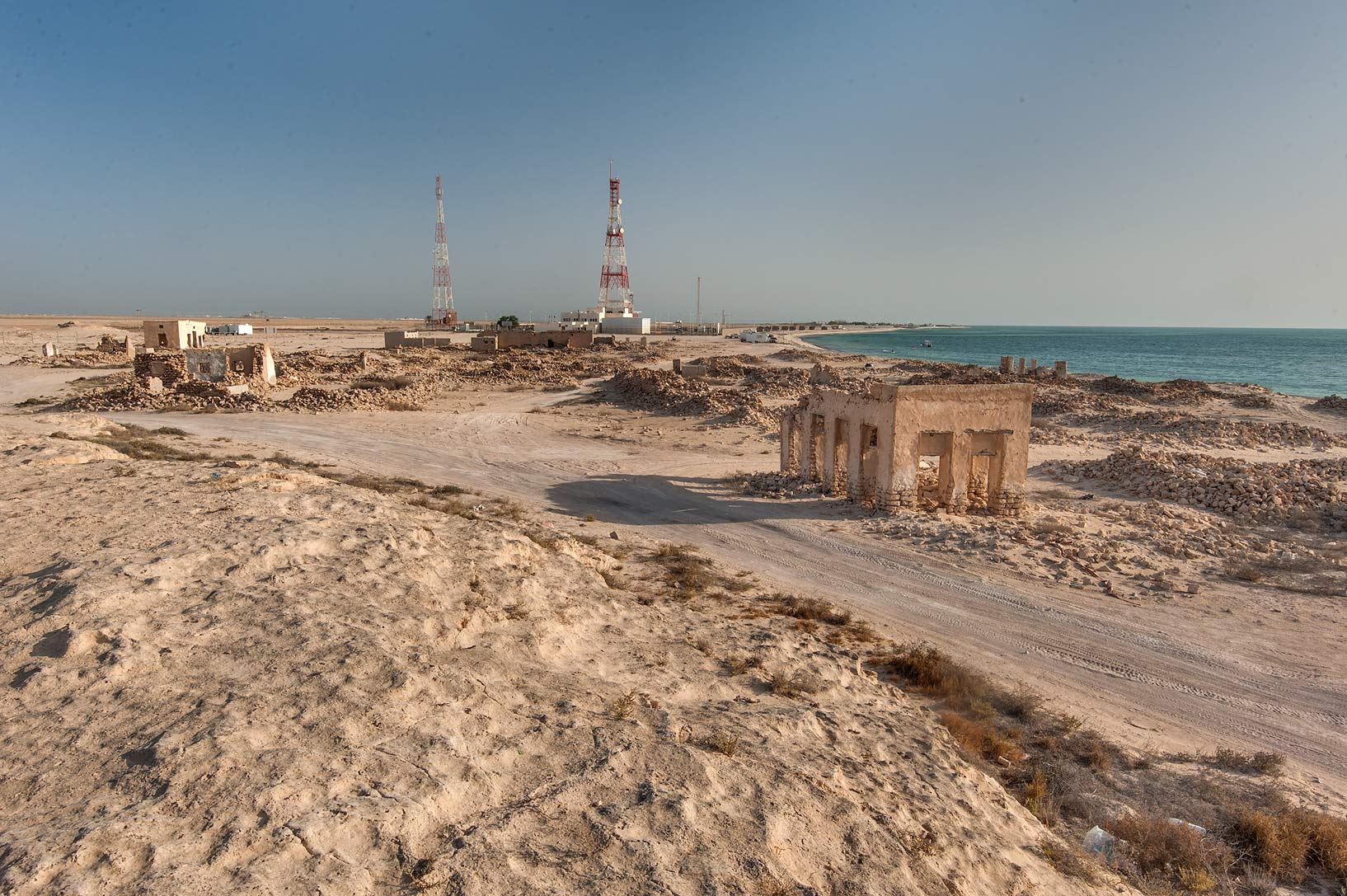
- View from Jebel Ghariyah of ruined buildings in the old village of Al Ghariyah

- Location in Qatar
- Coordinates: 26°4′41″N 51°21′42″E
- Country: Qatar
- Municipality: Al Shamal
- Established: 1885

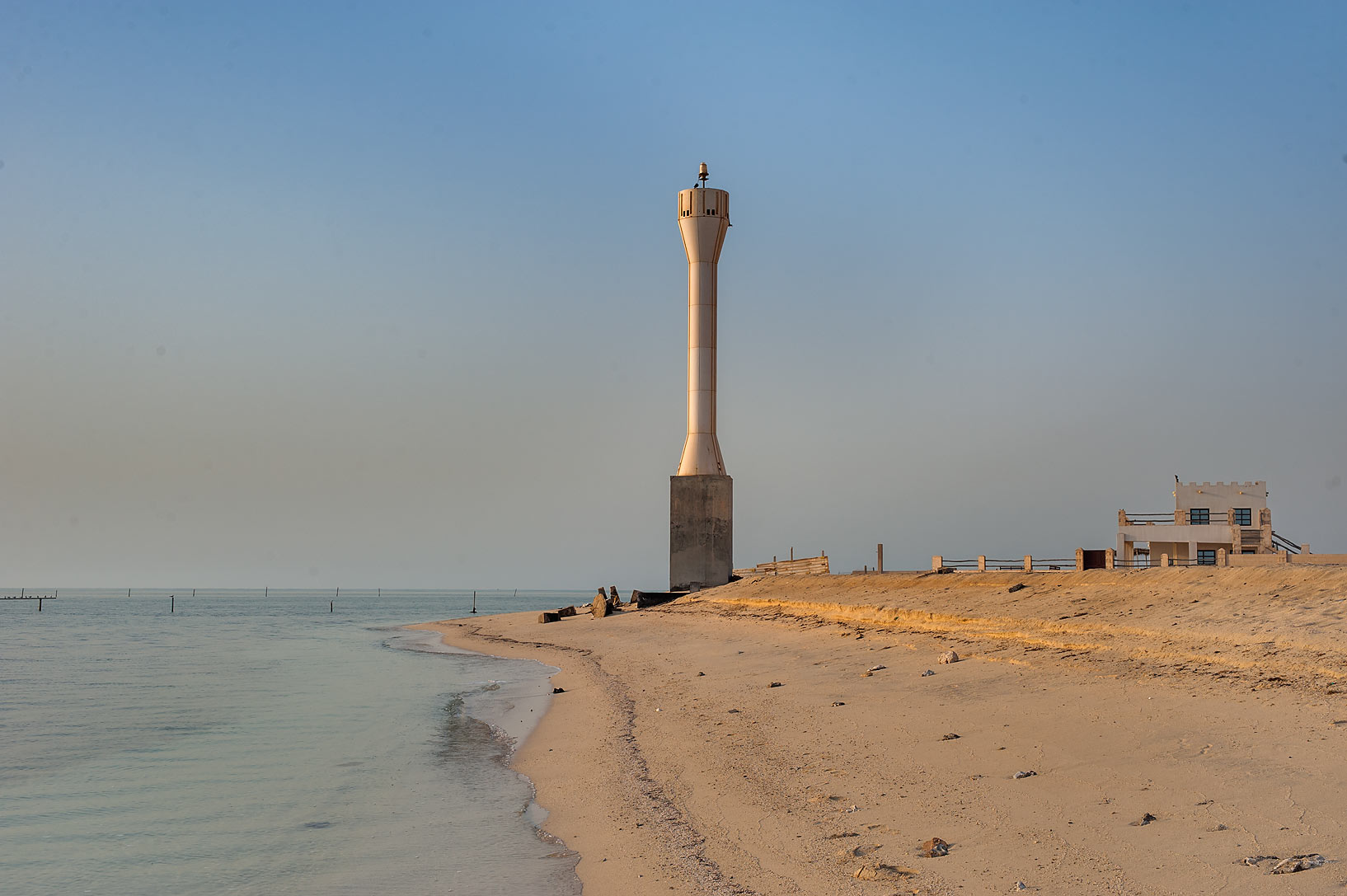
Ra's Umm Hasah Lighthouse on Al Ghariyah's coastline

Al Ghariyah (Arabic: الغارية) is a village on the northeast coast of Qatar located in the municipality of Al Shamal. It was founded in 1885 by settlers from the town of Al Wakrah. It was a site of contention between Qatari tribes allied with the Ottomans and Sheikh Jassim bin Mohammed Al Thani.

A number of ancient cup-marks and rock engravings were discovered in Al Ghariyah.

== Etymology ==
The name Ghariyah is derived from ghar, the Arabic word for "cave". It was so named because the area contains many hills with small caves.

== History ==
=== 19th century ===
Al Ghariyah was first settled in 1885 by a group of 100 members of the Al-Buainain and Al-Jehran tribes who had left the town of Al-Wakrah after a dispute with Sheikh Jassim bin Mohammed Al Thani. Al Ghariyah was almost immediately attacked by Jassim's troops. This, however, did not deter the town's growth. Muhammad bin Abdul Wahhab Al Faihani, a Bahraini merchant and brother-in-law of Jassim, soon emerged as the sheikh of the town. He came to lead the coalition formed to resist Jassim's rule, with the ultimate goal of achieving independence for Al Ghariyah.

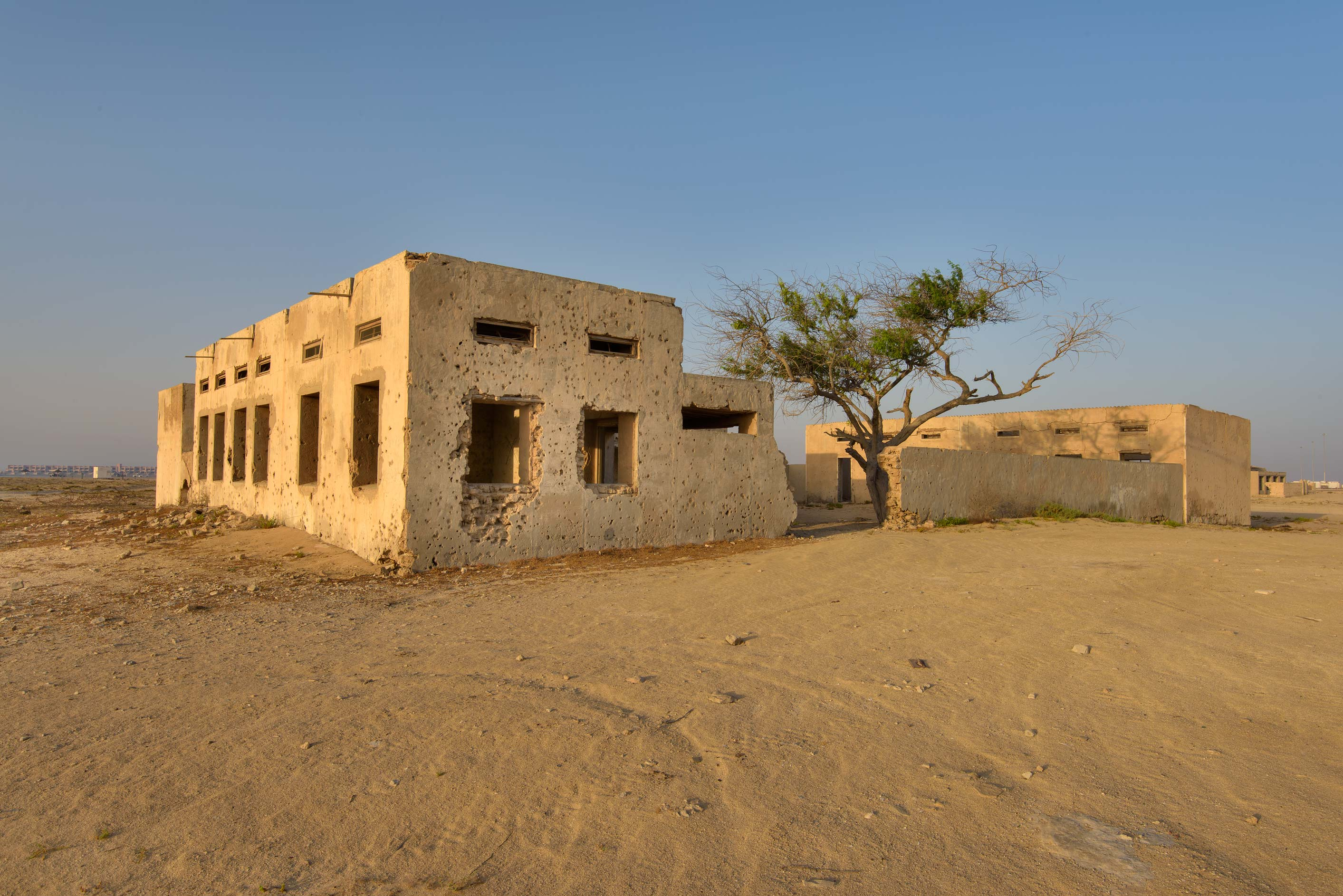
A ruined school building in Al Ghariyah

A meeting was soon summoned between Sheikh Jassim and Mohammed bin Abdul Wahab and the discussion was mediated by an Ottoman commander of an Al Bidda-situated gun boat. The Ottoman commander's proposal that the coalition be left alone infuriated Sheikh Jassim. This incited tribesmen loyal to Sheikh Jassim to attack Al Ghariyah, but they were defeated, with the Bani Hajer tribe suffering a few casualties.

In an attempt to earn favor with the Ottomans stationed in Qatar while simultaneously undermining Jassim's authority, Abdel Wahab suggested the establishment of an Ottoman customs in Doha. Although the inhabitants of Doha protested against it, the Ottomans favored his suggestion. In May 1885, out of a coalition of 50 Ottoman troops who arrived that month, 20 had been sent to protect Al Ghariyah. It was also reported that the Mutasarrif of al-Hasa proclaimed Al Ghariyah to be Ottoman territory.

Some time after its settlement, Al Ghariyah was mostly abandoned by its original settlers after the town founder, Mohammed bin Abdul Wahab, had a meeting with 250 members of the Al-Jehran tribe who by then had migrated to Al Ghariyah. The meeting, held in Bahrain, concluded that the founding tribes would leave Al Ghariyah and settle an area in Qatif with Mohammed bin Abdul Wahab as their leader.

=== 20th century ===
In 1908, Al Ghariyah was described in British diplomat J. G. Lorimer's encyclopedia, Gazetteer of the Persian Gulf, as a deserted village with the remains of a ruined fort in its confines.

The village was later repopulated and its first formal school was opened in 1957.

Like many other coastal towns in the north, Al Ghariyah was abandoned sometime in the mid-20th century after its aquifer was exhausted by the excessive use of diesel-powered water pumps.

=== 21st century ===
In the 21st century, the Qatari government has been active in implementing projects in Al Ghariyah in an attempt to develop it as a tourist destination. One such project is the Al Ghariyah Resorts, which features many high-end villas overlooking the coast.

== Geography ==
Because of Al Ghariyah's precise location on the coast, in the past its inhabitants lacked direct access to the groundwater. Moreover, the water that could be obtained was saline. Therefore, the village formed a trade relationship with the nearby settlements of Al-ʽAdhbah, Filiha, and Ain Sinan in which it would receive water in exchange for sea goods such as fish and pearls.

Al Ghariyah's landscape is influenced by a series of wind-blown ridges believed to date back to the end of the Late Pleistocene period. These ridges start in and enclose Fuwayrit, approximately 6.5 kilometres (4.0 mi) to the south. In Al Ghariyah, these ridges, which form Jebel Ghariyah, are noticeably lower and shorter than in Fuwayrit; with a length of 200 meters (660 ft) and a height of 5 meters (16 ft).

Al Ghariyah Beach is a popular spot for tourists to encamp, and has traditionally played host to the desert camp of The Scout and Guide Association of Qatar. A small number of sea turtles nest near the town's coastline during breeding season (late spring to early summer). The area is regularly patrolled by the Ministry of Municipality and Environment (MME) to ensure the conservation of these nests.

== Archaeology ==
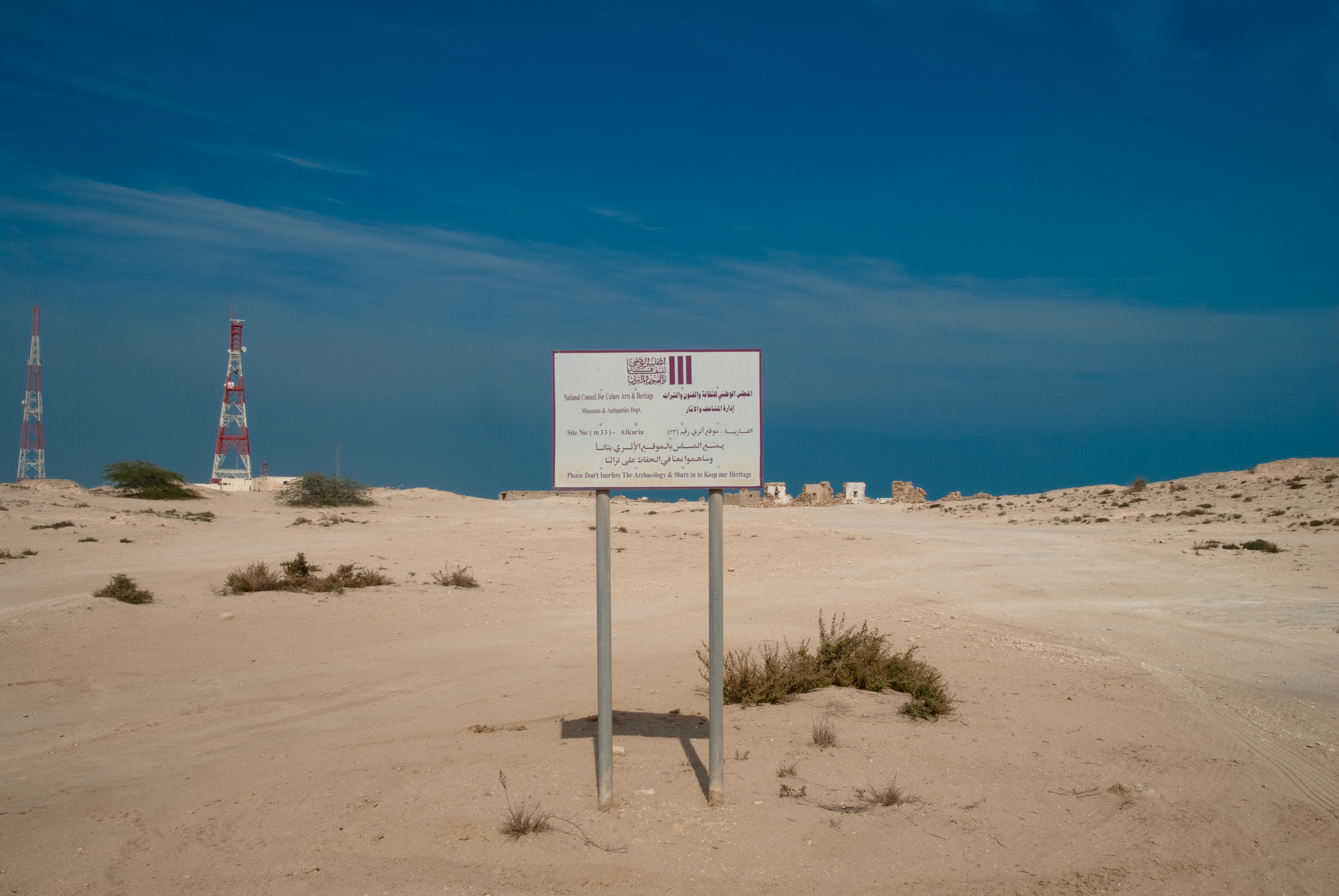
A sign declaring Al Ghariyah as a protected archaeological site

A number of structures dating to as early as the 17th century and as late as the mid-19th century have been discovered. To the east of these structures and the proceeding village that was formed in 1885 are various petroglyphs carved on the sides of the low rock outcrops on the southern flank of Jebel Ghariyah. Consistent with what has been observed elsewhere in the country, cup-marks are the most common form of rock carving. Here they appear in various forms, such as single cup-marks measuring 0.38 cm (0.15 in) in diameter, in daisy-like patterns known as rosettes, and in aligned rows of three to six cup-marks. Furthermore, similar to what was observed in Fuwayrit 6 km (3.7 mi) to the south, there are also rock carvings at the highest point of the jebel at its northern extremity, a spot that would have offered the best vantage point of returning pearling vessels.

The motifs of Jebel Ghariyah's petroglyphs bear much resemblance to those found at nearby Jebel Fuwayrit and Jebel Jassassiyeh, and even to rock carvings found in the east in Freiha. It is speculated that aside from aesthetic purposes, these rock carvings also served functional purposes such as facilitating board games like mancala.
