= Ahmed bin Mohammed Al Thani =

Emir of Qatar from 1898 to 1905

Emir of Qatar
- Reign: 1898–1905
- Predecessor: Jassim bin Mohammed Al Thani
- Successor: Mohammed bin Jassim Al Thani
- Born: 1853
- Died: December 1905 (aged 52); Doha, Qatar
- Arabic: أحمد بن محمد آل ثاني
- Dynasty: Thani
- Father: Mohammed bin Thani

Ahmed bin Mohammed Al Thani (Arabic: أحمد بن محمد آل ثاني; 1853– December 1905), was the second son of Mohammed bin Thani, the Governor of Doha (1894–1898), Emir of Qatar (1898–1905) and head of the Ahmed bin Muhammed Al Thani branch of the House of Thani, the ruling family of Qatar. He was also the younger brother of the founder of the State of Qatar, Jassim bin Mohammed Al Thani.

== Sheikh Jassim's abdication in favor of Sheikh Ahmad ==
Multiple sources state that Sheikh Jassim abdicated in favor of his brother in 1898. In the same year Jassim moved to Lusail with his family, and even though he considered abdicating in favor of his son Sheikh Muhammad, he soon learned that the chiefs in Qatar preferred his brother Sheikh Ahmed. In a letter written by J. C. Gaskin, Assistant Political Agent, Bahrain on 20 September 1903 to Captain V. dkV. Hunt Political Resident in the Persian Gulf, it was stated "after obtaining their signature [Qatar Chiefs] to document to that effect, he informed the Porte, the Wali of Basrah, and the Mitassarif of Al Hasa of his abdication in favor of his brother, and request them to refer all matters to the latter in future, and Sheikh Ahmed has been virtually the Sheikh of Qatar, and accepted as such by the people as well as the Turks since 1898." Sheikh Ahmad verified his older brother's abdication when J. C. Gaskin met him on Al Wakrah beach on 19 September 1903.

Sheikh Ahmed was noted as a clever man with a remarkable personality by the Political Agent in Bahrain at that time, when he met the Sheikh in November 1905 at his house in Al Bidda, describing him as “extraordinary”, in his letter to the Political Resident in the Persian Gulf. Prior to meeting the Ahmed, the Political Agent met with Jassim in Lusail where he had been residing, for more than five years. Jassim was in his eighties at the time and suffering from severe ophthalmia while being accompanied by his son-in-law Nasir bin Mubarak Al-Khalifa, which took the Political Agent by surprise as he was hoping to meet Jassim and Ahmad together. The Agent described the latter incident in his letter by stating "I was disappointed at not seeing Sheikh Ahmed in Sheikh Jasim's camp as he was aware that I had expressed a wish to meet him there. It seems, however, that a certain amount of latent jealousy exists between the two brothers and the presence of Nasir bin Mubarak whom he does not like also probably contributed to keep the younger brother away."

The Political Agent wrote about his visit that took place in Ahmad's house a few days after visiting Jassim as he was adamant on meeting him, describing it as a hospitable visit, stating; "Sheikh Ahmed received me in a most friendly style, and put me up in his guest-room, making my clerical staff and sepoys most comfortable elsewhere." He also described Ahmed as one who possesses a partisan spirit who was popular and influential amongst his subjects. The forty-five year Ahmed also appeared to possess a lighthearted personality which is evident through the statement "Whenever a point was hard pressed against him, he would break into most infectious roars of laughter, though the causes were hard to find, and to such an extent almost to make one question his sanity. There is no doubt however that the people of Bahrain and Qatar regard him as being a strong and clever man."

== Death ==
He was killed by his servant in Doha in December 1905. His murderer's name was Bin Mu'ammam and even though it was rumored that the murderer and his two accomplices were executed by Jassim, this was found to be incorrect. It was claimed by the British political agent residing in Bahrain at the time that overlooked, reported on and frequently visited Qatar that a strong minority of people in Qatar believed that Sheikh Khalifa, the eldest son of Jassim was an abettor in Ahmad's assassination. After Ahmad's death, his eldest son Sheikh Ali was considered to be appointed to take up his father's many responsibilities, but was deemed too young by Jassim.

== Legacy ==
In honor of Shaikh Ahmad:

- Ahmad bin Mohammed Military College was established in Qatar in 1996 by Sheikh Hamad bin Khalifa Al Thani.
- Ahmad bin Mohammed bin Thani street was named after him.
- Ahmad bin Mohammed Secondary School for boys was established and named after him.

Despite his honorable role as Jassim's right hand man throughout the establishment, and running of state affairs of the State of Qatar, Ahmed is usually unmentioned during the Qatar National Day Celebrations held every year on 18 December. The overwhelming amount of evidence stating the succession of Ahmad as ruler of Qatar after his Jasim's abdication in 1898 is usually ignored by the Qatari media.

== Children ==
- Sheikh Mubarak Bin Ahmed
- Sheikh Muhammed Bin Ahmed (1877–1975)
- Sheikh Abdullah Bin Ahmed (1880–1973)
- Sheikh Ali Bin Ahmed (1883–1931)
- Sheikh Abdelrahman Bin Ahmed (b. 1886)
- Sheikh Nasir Bin Ahmed (1892–1906)
- Sheikh Khalid Bin Ahmed (1893–1977)
- Sheikh Abdelaziz Bin Ahmed (1894)
- Sheikh Khalifa Bin Ahmed (1896–1983), grandfather of Abdullah bin Nasser bin Khalifa Al Thani
- Sheikh Saif Bin Ahmed (1898–1991)
- Sheikh Jabr Bin Ahmed (1899–1984)
- Sheikh Ahmed Bin Ahmed (1903–1987)
