= Thani bin Mohammed =

Founder of Qatari royal family (died 1825)

Thani bin Mohammed ثاني بن محمد
- Born: Zubarah, Qatar
- Died: 1825; Doha, Qatar
- Issue: Thamir bin Thani bin Mohammed Al Thamir; Mohammed bin Thani; Eid bin Thani bin Mohammed Al Thamir; Ali bin Thani bin Mohammed Al Thamir; Ahmad bin Thani bin Mohammed Al Thamir
Names
- Thani ibn Mohammed ibn Thamir ibn Ali ibn Saif ibn Mohammed ibn Rashid ibn Ali ibn Sultan ibn Bareed ibn Saad ibn Salem ibn Amr ibn Mihadd ibn Rays ibn Zakher ibn Muhammad ibn Alawi ibn Wahib ibn Qasim ibn Musa ibn Masoud ibn Uqbah ibn Snai ibn Nahshel ibn Shaddad ibn Zuhair ibn Shihab ibn Rabi'a ibn Abu Soud ibn Malik ibn Hanzala
- Arabic: ثاني بن محمد ال ثامر
- Dynasty: Thani

Thani bin Mohammed (Arabic: ثاني بن محمد) also known as Thani bin Mohammed Al Thamir (Arabic: ثاني بن محمد ال ثامر), was the founder of the House of Thani and father of Mohammed bin Thani, who is recognized as the first emir of Qatar.

== Early life ==
He was born in Zubarah and emerged as a successful pearl trader.

He died in 1825. By the early 1825s, his second eldest son Sheikh Mohammed bin Thani emerged as the most important figure in Qatar and an important government official in the Persian Gulf.

== History ==
The Al Thani family can be traced back to Mudar ibn Nizar, a descendant of Ishmael. The tribe moved from the Najdi town of Ushaiger and settled at the Gebrin oasis in southern Najd (present-day Saudi Arabia) before they moved to Qatar. Around the 17th century, the tribe lived in Ushaiger, a settlement north-west of Riyadh. They settled in Qatar around the 1720s. Their first settlement in Qatar was in the southern town of Sikak, and from there they moved north-west to Zubarah and Al Ruwais. They settled in Doha in the 19th century under their leader Mohammed bin Thani. The group was named after his father Thani bin Mohammed.

The family is made of four main Arab houses: Banu Qasem, Bani Ahmed, Bani Jaber, and Bani Thamer As of the early 1990s, the number of the family members was estimated to be about 20,000.

== Children ==
Sheikh Mohammed had 5 children, all of whom were sons.

No.	Name	Government Position	Year of birth	Year of death
1	Sheikh Thamir bin Thani bin Mohammed Al Thamir	None	Unknown	Unknown
2	Sheikh Mohammed bin Thani	Emir of Qatar	1788	1878
3	Sheikh Eid bin Thani bin Mohammed Al Thamir	None	Unknown	Unknown
4	Sheikh Ali bin Thani bin Mohammed Al Thamir	None	Unknown	Unknown
5	Sheikh Ahmad bin Thani bin Mohammed Al Thamir	None	Unknown	Unknown
