= Mohammed bin Thani =

Emir of Qatar from 1851 to 1878

Emir of Qatar
- Reign: 1851 – 18 December 1878
- Successor: Jassim bin Mohammed Al Thani
- Born: 1776; Fuwayrit, First Saudi State
- Died: 18 December 1878 (Aged 102); Doha, Qatar
- Burial: Doha, Qatar
- Spouse: Noura al-Kuwari of Al-Mansouri Family
- Issue: Jassim bin Mohammed Al Thani; Ahmed bin Mohammed Al Thani; Fahad bin Mohammed Al Thani; Eid bin Mohammed Al Thani; Thamir bin Mohammed Al Thani; Jaber bin Mohammed Al Thani; Rowda bint Mohammed Al Thani; Mouza bint Mohammed Al Thani
Names
- Mohammed ibn Thani ibn Mohammed ibn Thamir ibn Ali ibn Saif ibn Mohammed ibn Rashid ibn Ali ibn Sultan ibn Bareed ibn Saad ibn Salem ibn Amr ibn Mihadd ibn Rays ibn Zakher ibn Muhammad ibn Alawi ibn Wahib ibn Qasim ibn Musa ibn Masoud ibn Uqbah ibn Snai ibn Nahshel ibn Shaddad ibn Zuhair ibn Shihab ibn Rabi'a ibn Abu Soud ibn Malik ibn Hanzala
- Arabic: محمد بن ثاني
- Dynasty: Thani
- Father: Thani bin Mohammed

Styles of The Emir of Qatar
- Reference style: His Highness
- Spoken style: Your Highness
- Alternative style: Sheikh

Mohammed bin Thani (Arabic: محمد بن ثاني; c. 1776-18 December 1878), also known as Mohammed bin Thani bin Mohammed Al Thamir (Arabic: محمد بن ثاني بن محمد آل ثامر), was the first ruler from the House of Thani to rule the whole Qatari Peninsula, officially being recognized by the British in September 1868 following a meeting with British representative Lewis Pelly. He is known for being the father of Sheikh Jassim bin Mohammed Al Thani, the founder of Qatar and who fended off the Ottoman army in the late 19th century.

== Biography ==
Sheikh Mohammed bin Thani was born in Fuwayrit, Qatar, According to the Amiri Diwan he was born in 1776 and was appointed by his father as predecessor to the throne, Sheikh Thani bin Mohammad with Sheikh Mohammed being the second eldest son of his father, along with his four siblings.

It was not until Mohammed bin Thani and his family moved from Fuwayrit to Al Bidda in 1848 that he began to exert influence over the peninsula. Prior to this migration, each tribe and settlement had its independent leader, and there was no documented instance of their unification in battle. The concept of a unified land or nation was not present. However, with Mohammed bin Thani's arrival, Qatar began to gain significant economic and political weight, albeit while still remaining under Bahrain's suzerainty.

In 1851, Mohammed bin Thani found himself in the midst of a conflict between Faisal bin Turki, Imam of the Emirate of Najd, and Muhammad bin Khalifa Al Khalifa, ruler of Bahrain. Faisal had long sought to gain control of Bahrain and had previously attempted, and failed, to invade the island. In May 1851, Faisal launched his third attempt to capture Bahrain, ordering his forces to proceed towards Al Bidda, Qatar, which was intended to be used as a staging area for an invasion of Bahrain. In response, Ali bin Khalifa, the Bahraini representative in Qatar, called on all men of fighting age to defend Al Bidda, as well as sending for help from Saeed bin Tahnun Al Nahyan of Abu Dhabi. Mohammed bin Thani served as one of the leaders of the Qatari forces, alongside his son.

Qatari and allied forces were embroiled in three days of heavy fighting with Faisal's forces in the Battle of Mesaimeer from 2 June to 4 June 1851. On the second day, the Bahraini and Abu Dhabi forces retreated to their ships, refusing to render further aid to the Qataris. Shortly after the battle ended, Mohammed bin Thani negotiated a separate peace agreement with Faisal in which he agreed to be under Wahhabi governance provided that he remains chief of Al Bidda, which Faisal agreed. On 8 June, Qatari forces under the leadership of Mohammed bin Thani assumed control of Burj Al-Maah, a watchtower guarding Doha's main water source, close to Al Bidda Fort where the allied forces of Ali bin Khalifa and Saeed bin Tahnoun were stationed. Upon hearing the news, they fled to Bahrain without incident, much to the dismay of Faisal who admonished Mohammed bin Thani for not capturing them.

On 25 July 1851, Saeed bin Tahnun successfully negotiated a treaty between the Bahrainis and Wahhabis, in which the Bahrainis would pay an annual zakat to Faisal in exchange for his renouncement of any claims to Qatar and return of Al Bidda to the chieftainship of Ali bin Khalifa. Mohammed bin Thani, as party to this agreement, agreed to relinquish his position.

The battle created political enmity between Qatar and Bahrain which contributed to the Qatari–Bahraini War in 1867 and Qatar's subsequent emergence as an independent political entity, which came to fruition on 12 September 1868 with the signing of a treaty between Mohammad bin Thani and the British representative Lewis Pelly.

In 1871, Sheikh Mohammed made a plea for protection against any external attack to the Ottomans at Al Hasa. However, the Ottomans were the ones who displayed hostility to the Qataris in the same decade of his plea.

=== Death ===
Sheikh Mohammed died of natural causes on 18 December 1878. His date of death is a national day in Qatar.

== Children ==
Sheikh Mohammed had 8 children; six sons and two daughters.

| No. | Name | Government Position | Year of birth | Year of death |
|---|---|---|---|---|
| 1 | Sheikh Jassim bin Mohammed Al Thani | Ruler of Qatar (1878–1913) | c. 1825 | 1913 |
| 2 | Sheikh Ahmed bin Mohammed Al Thani | Governor of Doha | 1853 | 1905 |
| 3 | Sheikh Fahad bin Mohammed Al Thani | None | Unknown | Died early |
| 4 | Sheikh Eid bin Mohammed Al Thani | None | Unknown | Died early |
| 5 | Sheikh Jaber bin Mohammed Al Thani | None | 1878 | 1934 |
| 6 | Sheikh Thamir bin Mohammed Al Thani | None | Unknown | Unknown |
| 7 | Sheikha Rowda bint Mohammed Al Thani | None | Unknown | Unknown |
| 8 | Sheikha Mouza bint Mohammed Al Thani | None | Unknown | Unknown |

Mohammed bin Thani House of Al-Thani Born: c. 1776 Died: 18 December 1878
Regnal titles
| Preceded by Thani bin Mohammed Al Thamir | Emir of Qatar; 1851–1876 | Succeeded by Jassim bin Mohammed Al Thani |
