= Scout and Guide Association of Qatar =

National scouting and guiding organization of Qatar

- Country: Qatar
- Founded: 1956
- Membership: 6,000
- Affiliation: World Association of Girl Guides and Girl Scouts, World Organization of the Scout Movement
- Website https://web.archive.org/web/20070224142046/http://www.qtrscouts.com/

The Scout and Guide Association of Qatar (Arabic: جمعية الكشافة والمرشدات القطرية) is the national scouting and guiding organization of Qatar. Scouting was founded in Qatar in 1956 and became a member of the World Organization of the Scout Movement in 1965; the organization is also a member of the World Association of Girl Guides and Girl Scouts. It serves 4,208 Scouts (as of 2011) and 1,916 Guides (as of 2003). The Scout president facilitated the building of the local zoo.

Program emphasis is on out-of-school education in religion, citizenship and health as well as the usual Scoutcrafts, physical fitness and community service.

There are Scout courses in wildlife conservation and projects for increasing plant life.

Guiding was started in 1995, as the present government issued a decree and accepted the formation of the Guiding movement. Immediately, the Guides joined the Scouts and The Scout and Guide Association of Qatar was established. The Minister of Education has recruited six Commissioners to promote Guiding as an extracurricular activity in all schools. All leaders are teachers in the schools.

Guiding is rapidly gaining a high profile in society, reflected in their membership. Members come from different areas and various sections of society. Guiding mostly operates from Doha, however some units have started in different parts of the country. Membership stood at 2,011 as of February 2002.

There is a special program for Sea Scouts who are trained in all water and boat activities. There is also a small Air Scout section.

The Scout Motto is Kun Musta'idan or كن مستعداً, translating as Be Prepared in Arabic. The noun for a single Scout is Kashaf or كشاف in Arabic. The membership badge incorporates elements of the coat of arms of Qatar, and both the trefoil representing the girls and the fleur-de-lis representing the boys.

== International Scouting units in Qatar ==
There are American Boy Scouts in Doha, linked to the Direct Service branch of the Boy Scouts of America, which supports units around the world, as well as Girl Scouts of the USA).

British Scouting Overseas is represented in Doha and Al-Khor by the 1st Doha Scout Group.

British Scouting Overseas exists to support families around the world where, due to cultural or language barriers (and the fact that people from the UK living overseas may frequently move around), it is not always possible for young people from the UK to join local Scout Groups in the country where they reside. Importantly, existing members of the UK Scout Association who wish to continue their involvement with the Movement while living here in Qatar can do so if they wish.

The 1st Doha Scout Group, currently consists of Beaver Scout Colonies (one at Sherborne School, one at Doha English Speaking School (DESS), two Cub Scout Packs (one at Sherborne School, one at DESS) and a Scout Troop based at DESS.

In Al-Khor, a town north of Doha, a Beaver Scout section, a Cub Scout section and a Scout section are operating to deliver British Scouting to young people in the town.
