= Fuwayrit =

Fuwayrit فويرط
- Village
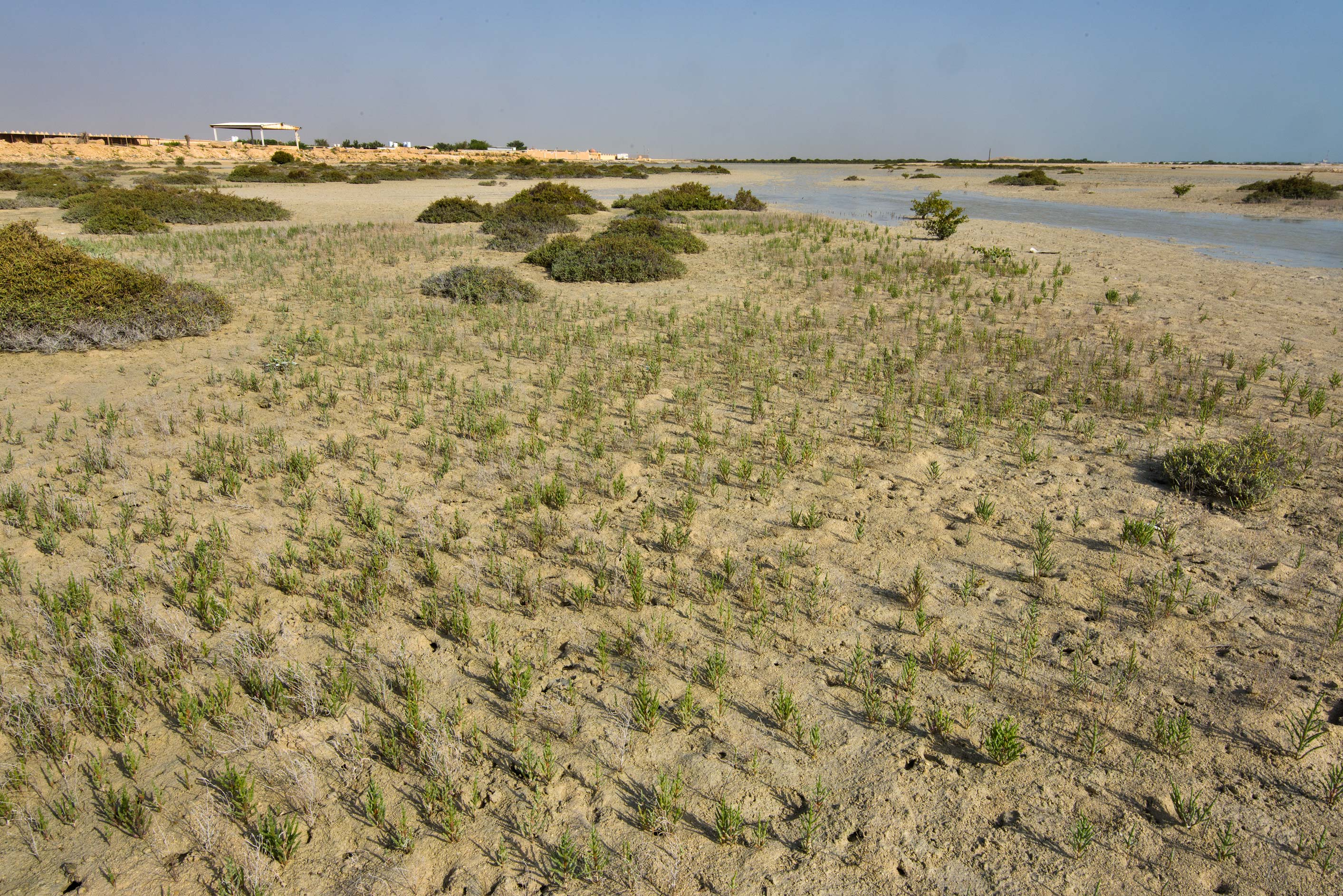
- A view of Fuwayrit's beach

- Fuwayrit
- Coordinates: 26°1′18″N 51°22′1″E
- Country: Qatar
- Municipality: Ash Shamal
- Zone no.: 77
- District no.: 373

Area
  - Total: 3.4 km^{2} (1.3 sq mi)

Fuwayrit (Arabic: فويرط; also spelled as Fuwairat) is a Qatari coastal village in the municipality of Ash Shamal approximately 90 km (56 mi) north of the capital Doha. It is an important site for Qatar's oil industry. Archaeological evidence suggests that it may have been settled as early as the 16th century. Previously, it was one of the most important towns in the northern sector of Qatar, having served as the seat of power for the Al Thani who had migrated here during the 18th century, before relocating to Al Bidda (presently Doha) in 1847. According to tradition, Mohammed bin Thani, regarded as the first ruler of the modern state of Qatar, was born here.

== Etymology ==
According to the Ministry of Municipality and Environment, Fuwayrit is derived from the Arabic word farat (or fart), meaning "to advance" or "to progress". This name was chosen in reference to a man who left his tribe in Fuwayrit by boat. Another theory states that the name originates from furat, which is translated as "small hill".

== History ==
=== 18th century ===
Fuwayrit served as the main residence of the Al Musallam rulers of Qatar during the 1600s and 1700s, while they had their main fort at Al Huwaila. Approximately 2,000 members of the Al Musallam lived in Qatar during that period. The Banu Ali also had their homes here.

According to family tradition, the Al Thani family migrated from Zubarah, previously Qatar's largest town, to Fuwayrit some time in the late 1700s. Mohammed bin Thani, who went on to rule the Peninsula, was born here.

=== 19th century ===
==== First British survey ====
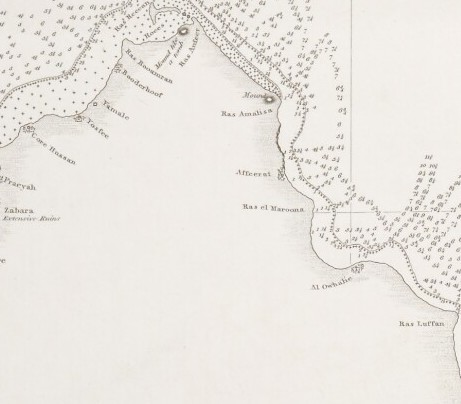
Fuwayrit depicted as Affeerat in an 1824 map

In the 1820s, George Barnes Brucks carried out the first British survey of the Persian Gulf. He recorded the following notes about Fuwayrit, which he referred to as Affeeraat:

Affeeraat, a small fishing town, in lat. 26° V 50' N., long. 51° 26' E., is inhabited by about one hundred and fifty men of the Abookara and Uttoobee Tribes, subject to Bahrein. A few cattle and water may be procured here. There are some small hills near this town, by which it may be known.

==== 1828–1829 conflict ====
In 1828–1829, a conflict emerged between the inhabitants of Fuwayrit and Doha after natives of Fuwayrit robbed a family with close ties to the Al Thani family. A nephew of Thani bin Mohammed named Khalfan bin Khalfan inherited a large sum of money after his father, a wealthy tawash (pearl trader), died. Khalfan's mother gave Thani the inheritance to invest on her son's behalf. When Khalfan reached adulthood, Thani distributed the money, which now amounted to a fortune, to Khalfan, and to his own son Mohammed bin Thani. Khalfan used his share of the wealth to open a business in Fuwayrit. Tensions soon arose between envious Fuwayrit residents and Khalfan, culminating in Khalfan being robbed of all his money.

Having been deprived of his livelihood, he appealed to Abdullah bin Ahmad Al Khalifa, the Bahraini representative stationed in Qatar, as the peninsula was under nominal Bahraini suzerainty at this time. However, he had little interest in Khalfan's protests as he was preoccupied with the recent death of his brother, Salman. A man named Ali bin Amr Al Attiyah was present during Khalfan's appeal and promised to lend his aid on account of a tribal alliance. They went to Doha where they were successful in receiving volunteers from the Bani Malik, Al Soudan, and Al Salata tribes. The coalition forces departed from Doha and traveled to Fuwayrit via boat. Upon receiving news of the joint force's impending arrival, the culprits surrendered the stolen wealth without incident.

==== Battle of Fuwayrit ====
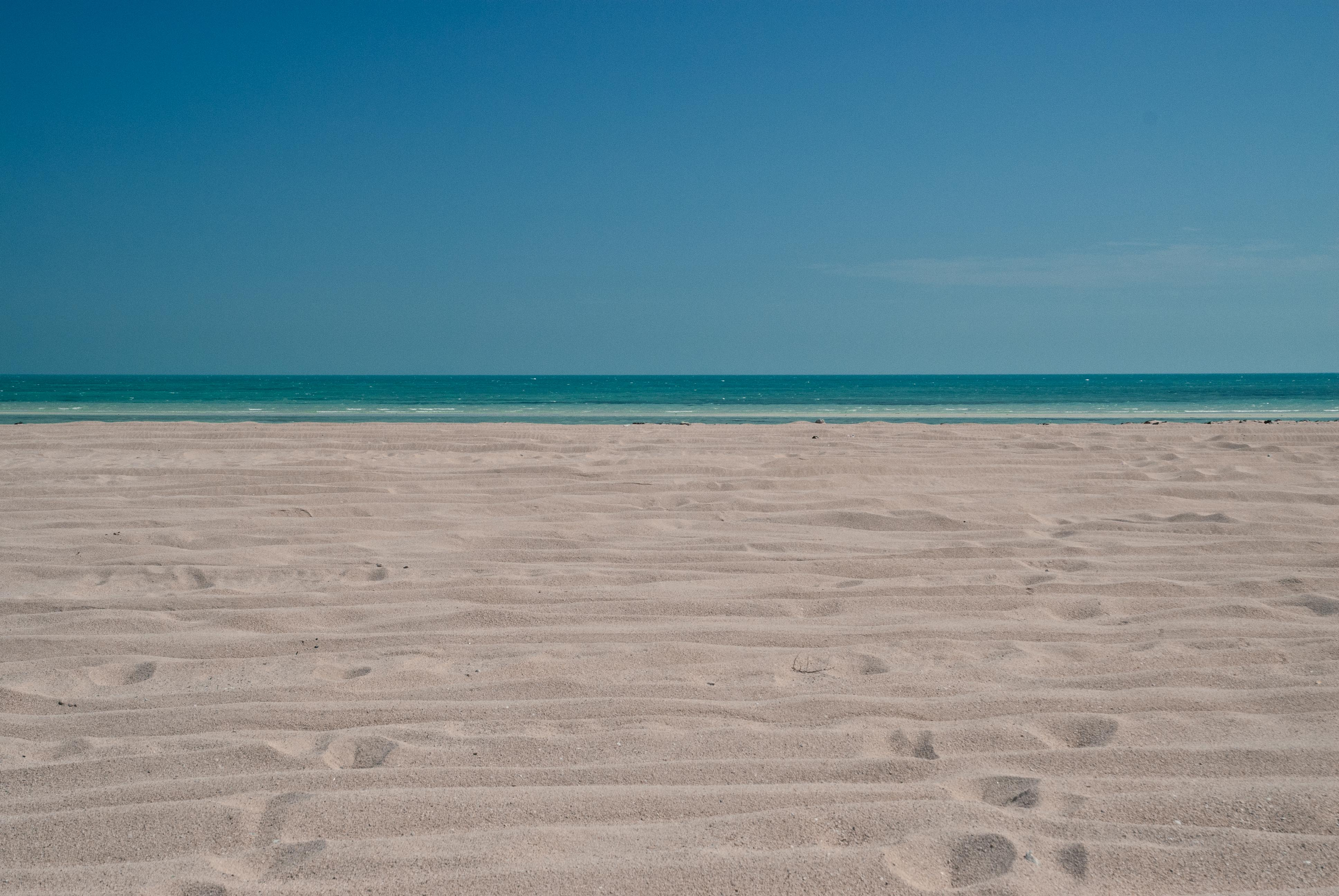
Coastline of Fuwayrit

The town was frequently visited and its affairs interfered with by the King of Bahrain, Mohammed bin Khalifa, who in 1843 ascended the throne. In 1847, Isa bin Tarif, the chief of Al Bidda, became convinced that Mohammed bin Khalifa wanted to bring the nearby town of Zubarah under his control to prevent future attacks on Bahrain from being launched from the coast of Qatar.

The deposed ruler of Bahrain, Abdullah bin Ahmed bin Khalifa, lived in Qatar during this period. After garnering support from the Wahhabis of Najd, he threatened to occupy Bahrain. In addition to having support from the Wahhabis, Isa bin Tarif had also pledged his allegiance to Abdullah bin Ahmed. This prompted Mohammed bin Khalifa to write a letter describing the situation to Captain William Lowe of the East India Company's naval squadron, in November. Captain Lowe responded to the letter by requesting Mohammed bin Khalifa to refrain from hostilities at sea, and warned that any vessels found being used for war would be seized. Mohammed bin Khalifa retorted by blaming Isa bin Tarif and Abdullah bin Ahmed for creating a warlike atmosphere. On 7 November 1847, Isa bin Tarif and his deputy jointly wrote to Samuel Hennell describing their suspicions of Mohammed bin Khalifa's plan to invade the north-east coast of Qatar.

Intent on defending the coast from Bahraini intervention, Isa bin Tarif and Mubarak bin Ahmed preemptively arrived in Fuwayrit with troops in the first week of November. Mohammed bin Khalifa retorted by sending 7 small ships and 20 battils and advancing towards Fuwayrit by way of Zubarah. As the tensions worsened, the British dispatched several naval ships to blockade Al Bidda and wrote warning letters to Isa bin Tarif, Abdullah bin Ahmed and Mohammed bin Khalifa. Shortly after, Mohammed bin Khalifa's military general Ali bin Khalifa landed on the coast of Al Khor with 500 Bahraini troops under his command. The Bahraini forces were accompanied by the governors of al-Hasa and Qatif. The forces of Isa bin Tarif and Mubarak bin Ahmed numbered 600 troops and lacked any cavalry units.

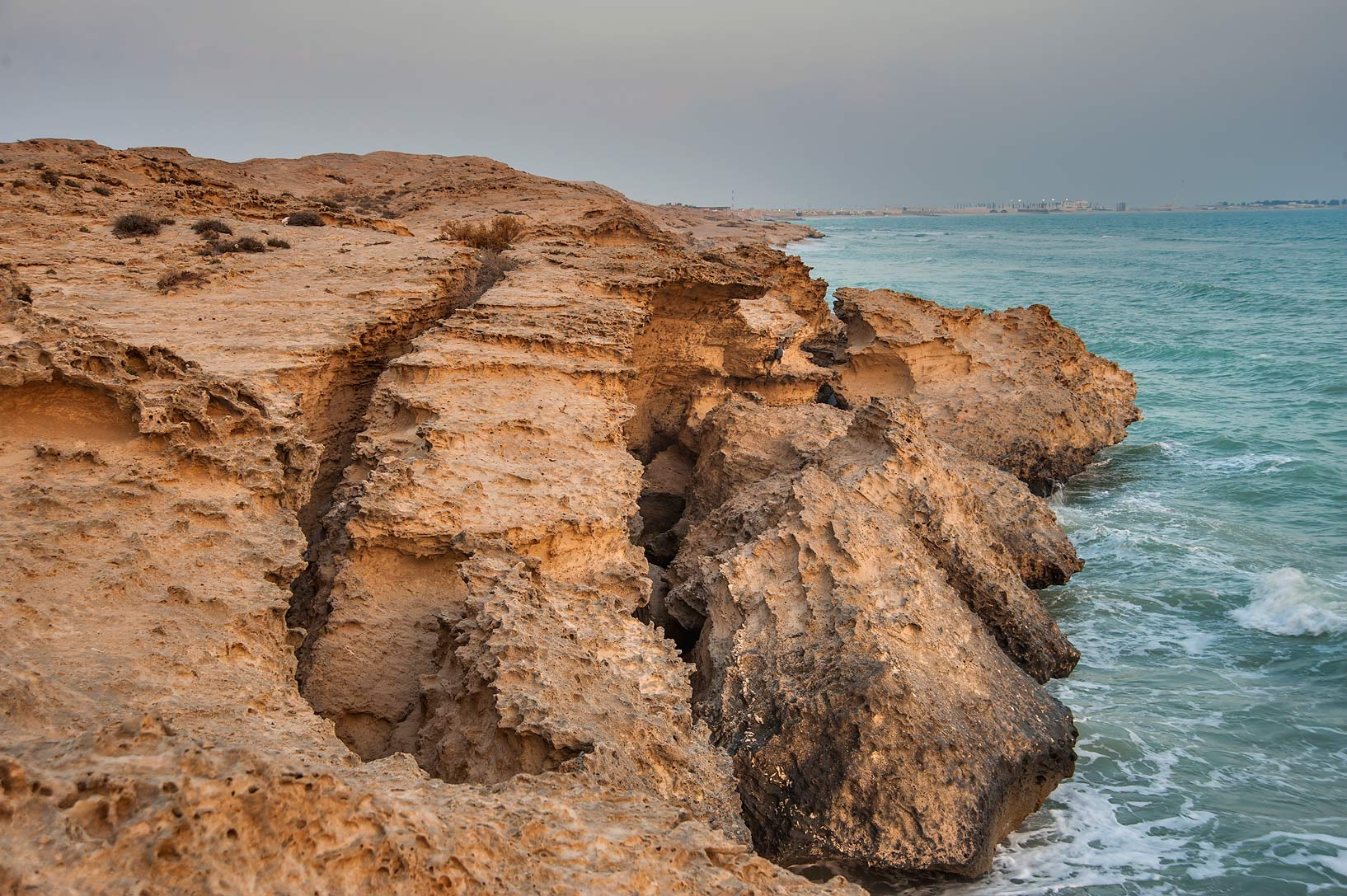
Cliffs of a rocky ridge in Jebel Fuwayrit (Fuwayrit Hill)

The decisive battle took place on 17 November 1847 near Fuwayrit. Isa bin Tarif's forces were defeated after he and eighty of his men were killed. After proclaiming victory, Mohammed bin Khalifa sent his warships to attack and demolish Al Bidda, and relocated most of its inhabitants to Bahrain. Afterwards, Abdullah bin Ahmed fled to Iran, while his son Mubarak bin Ahmed fled to Najd with 200 supporters. Mohammed bin Khalifa allowed 250 prisoners of war to settle on Kish Island. This was a defining point in Qatar's history, as Isa bin Tarif's death left a gap in the peninsula's leadership which was to be filled by the Al Thani family. Between 1848 and 1850, the Al Thani family relocated to Doha. This was proceeded by a landmark treaty signed between Mohammed bin Thani and the British government in 1868, in which Qatar's independence from Bahrain was acknowledged and in which Mohammed bin Thani was recognized as ruler of the Qatar Peninsula.

==== Late 19th century ====
In November 1879, there was a mass exodus of members of the Bu Kuwara tribe from Doha to Fuwayrit. The cause of the migration was tensions between the tribe and Emir Jassim bin Mohammed, and was said to have been instigated by the Bahraini sheikh. In 1881, they were joined by members of the Al Nuaim tribe.

An 1890 British account records Fuwayrit as "A small walled town with several towers, 12 miles northwest of Ras Laffan, standing on a small khor; it has some white sand-hills immediately to the northward of it. The people of these towns are of the Al Bu Kuwara [Kuwari] tribe. At about 4 miles north of this place, a small village with several towers has been established by people from Wakra, and called Al Ghariyah. A small village with several towers, called ar Riyat, now stands about 2 miles north of Fuwairit and just to northward of the sand hills."

=== 20th century ===
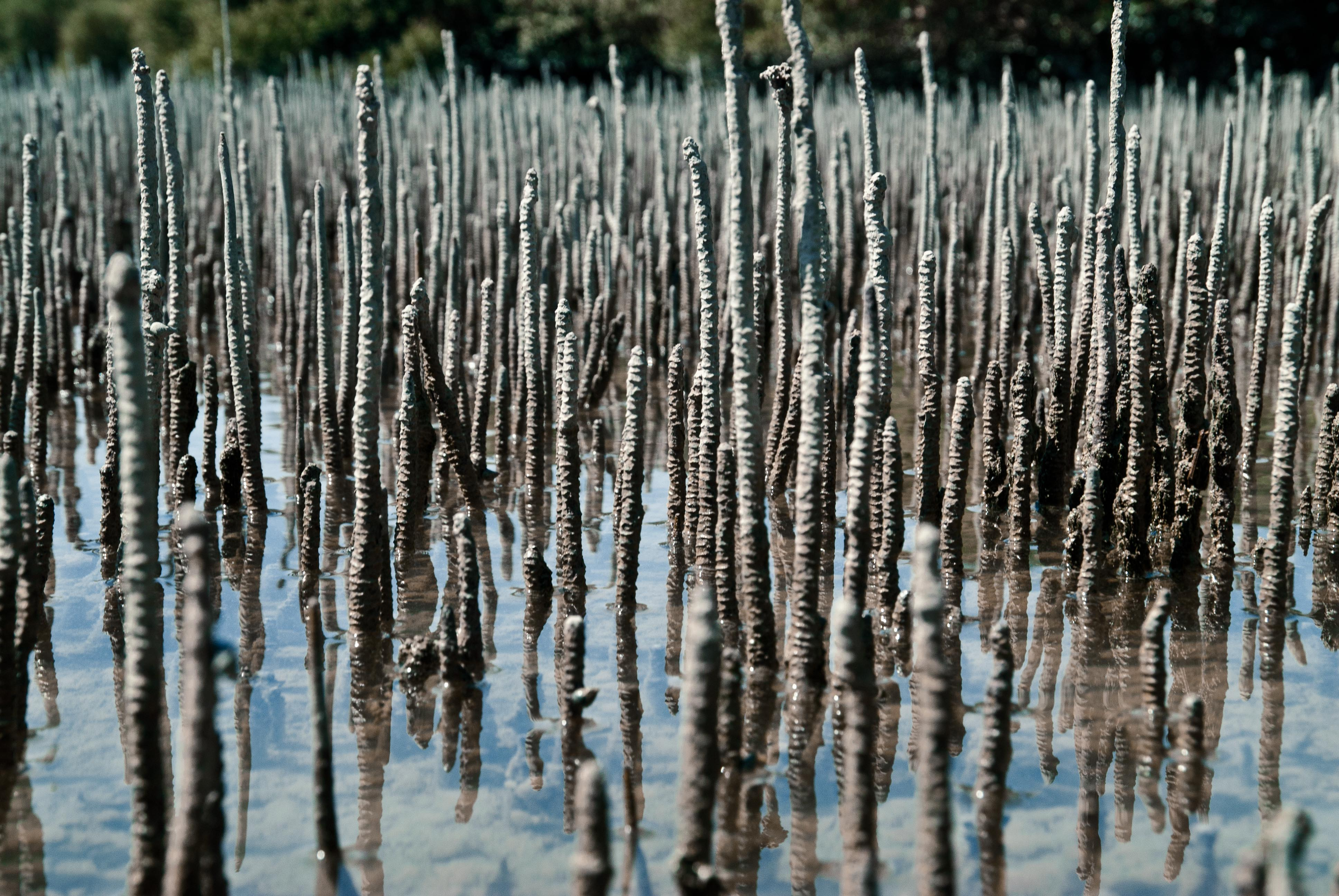
Mangroves in Fuwayrit

Fuwayrit was described as such in J.G. Lorimer's Gazetteer of the Persian Gulf in the early 20th century:

A village on the east side of Qatar promontory about 10 miles from its northern extremity. Immediately to the north of it is a hill called Jabal-al-Fuwairat, separating it from the site of the now deserted village of Ghariyah, which is also on the coast; according to another account, however, the Jabal is merely a vertical cliff 30 feet high, against the foot of which the sea breaks. The village is surrounded by towers, but it is not continuously walled and there are no gates. The house upon the circumference of the village are substantially built of stone and mud. The population of Fuwairat consists of about 100 houses of the Al Bu Kuwarah [Kuwari] tribe and 50 of Kibisah [Qubaisi]: these communities are divided from one another by a well marked street and form a southern and northern quarter respectively. The people live chiefly by pearl diving, but they also own some 20 horses, 100 camels, 60 donkeys and 80 cattle. About 35 pearl boats [manned by 420 men], 9 other sea-going vessels, and 12 fishing boats belong to the place. There are no shops. Indifferent water is obtained from the Zarka well, 1 mile west of the village, and good water from the wells of Filihah, and Ain Sinan distant 2 and 4 miles respectively to the south-west.

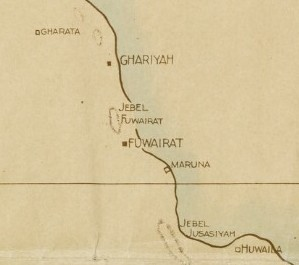
Fuwayrit depicted on a 1933 sketch map of the Qatar Peninsula

According to anthropological fieldwork in 1950, it was estimated that approximately 600 tents belonging to the Bu Kuwara tribe stood in the area.

According to the Origins of Doha Project, which is a UCL-headed project funded by the Qatar National Research Fund, aerial photographs taken of the site indicate that it was abandoned by the mid-20th century. However, a new village called Safya had emerged to the immediate south of Fuwayrit. It is possible that Fuwayrit, like many other settlements in Al Shamal during the mid-1900s, experienced significant population outflow due to upper aquifer salinization resulting from the overuse of diesel-powered water pumps. Nonetheless, once Qatar had begun reaping profits from its oil extraction activities, many northern settlements became repopulated as it had become feasible to transport water over longer distances.

=== 21st century ===
From January to February 2016, the Origins of Doha Project, being assisted by Qatar Museums, surveyed Fuwayrit and made a comprehensive list of all of its historic buildings which dated back to the 20th century. This was done to gain a more thorough understanding of the country's history during this period in lieu of written sources, which are scarce.

Aerial photography indicates that the new settlement of Fuwayrit, called Safya, has expanded considerably in the 21st century, particularly along the coast and towards Al Marroona. Nonetheless, construction outside the settlement boundaries is prohibited to prevent disruption of the area's small but diverse ecosystem.

== Landmarks ==
The Fuwayrit Mosque holds significant historical importance, dating back to the 1920s when it was initially constructed. Later, in the 1960s, it underwent reconstruction to preserve its traditional design and materials, comprising wood, mud, and stone. The mosque's rectangular structure features a distinct minaret, used for calling believers to prayer and potentially serving defensive purposes, being distinguished by its cylindrical design with five balconies. The reconstruction also paid attention to details such as the pavement leading to the main door, crafted using 20th-century techniques reminiscent of traditional Qatari architecture. Modern lighting technology was incorporated for enhanced visibility.

== Geography ==
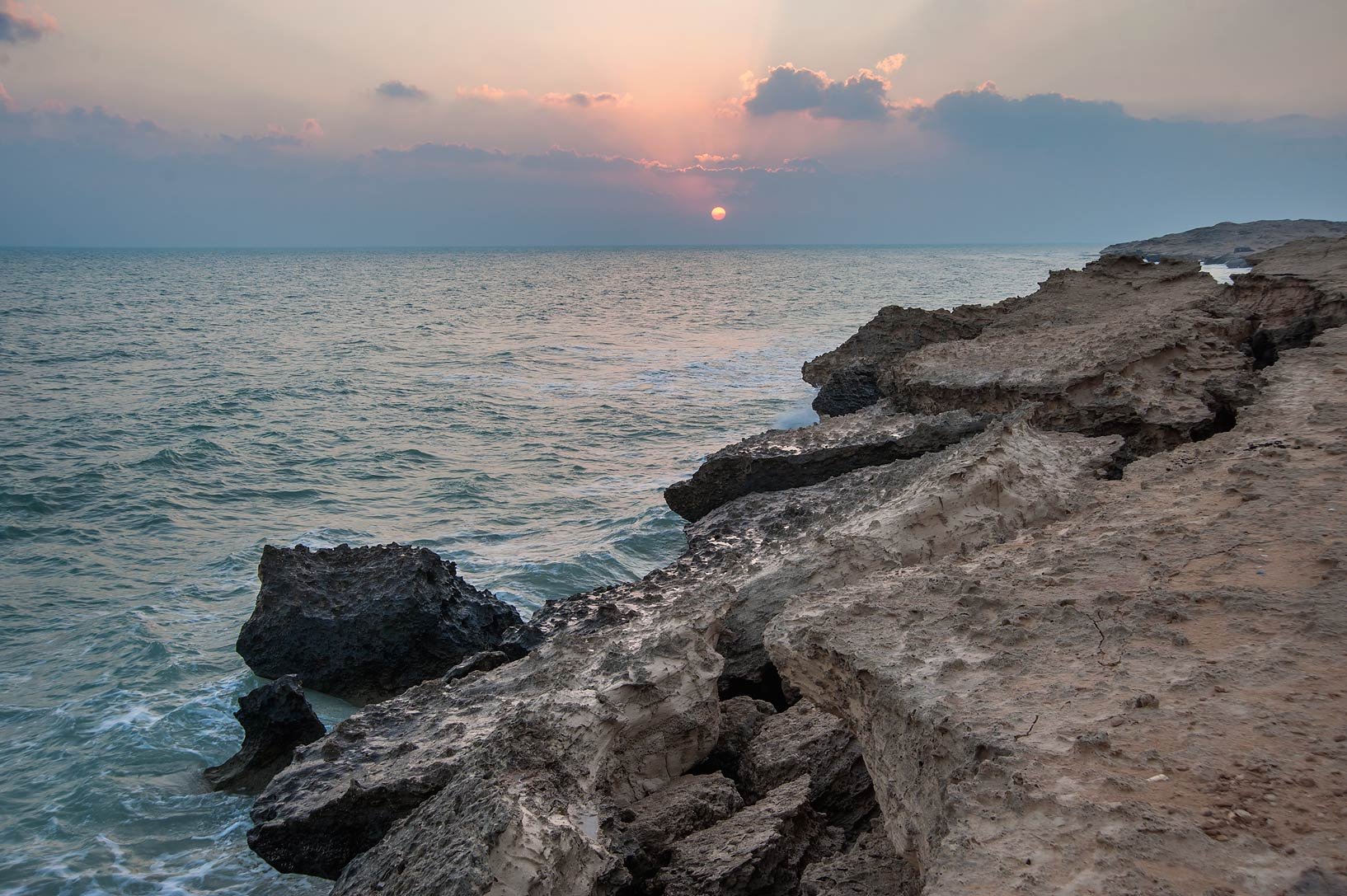
Rocky ridge of Jebel Fuwayrit overlooking a twilight vista

Nestled in northeast Qatar, Fuwayrit is 91 km (57 mi) north of the capital Doha. It forms the northernmost extension of the middle sector of Qatar's interior plain region. The area around Fuwayrit, as part of this middle sector, has a surface that gradually increases in elevation from north and east towards the south and west, with heights ranging between 11 metres (36 ft) to 21 metres (69 ft). Common vegetation found in Fuwayrit include mature shrubs of the Taverniera genus including aelijaan (Taverniera spartea) and dahseer (Taverniera aegyptiaca), and Soda inermis.

The original town was established on a short, tapered headland with a soil texture comprising mainly silty sand. On the coastline to the east, sandspits separated the town from the sea. More inland, a sabkha system has developed and is characterized by grassy rawdas. This sabkha branches out into a narrow channel that marks the northern extremity of the original town, and the beginning of a rocky upland to its immediate north. Since the original town's abandonment in the mid-20th century, the coastal sandspit has grown in size.

The dominant geological formation present in Fuwayrit and in most of north-east Qatar is the Dammam Formation, of which Eocene limestone is the primary component. Near the coast, the Dammam Formation is overlain by the Fuwayrit Formation, which consists of aeolian deposits that form Jebel Fuwayrit. The Al Ghariyah Fault runs parallel to Al Ghariyah and Fuwayrit.

=== Water resources ===
Historically, as Fuwayrit is based directly on the coast, seawater prevented direct access to the groundwater. Therefore, the village formed a trade relationship with the nearby settlements of Al-ʽAdhbah, Filiha, and Ain Sinan in which it would receive freshwater in exchange for sea goods. Fuwayrit's residents also visited an area 1.5 km (0.93 mi) inland called Zarqa, which they used as a source of farmland, freshwater and protection.

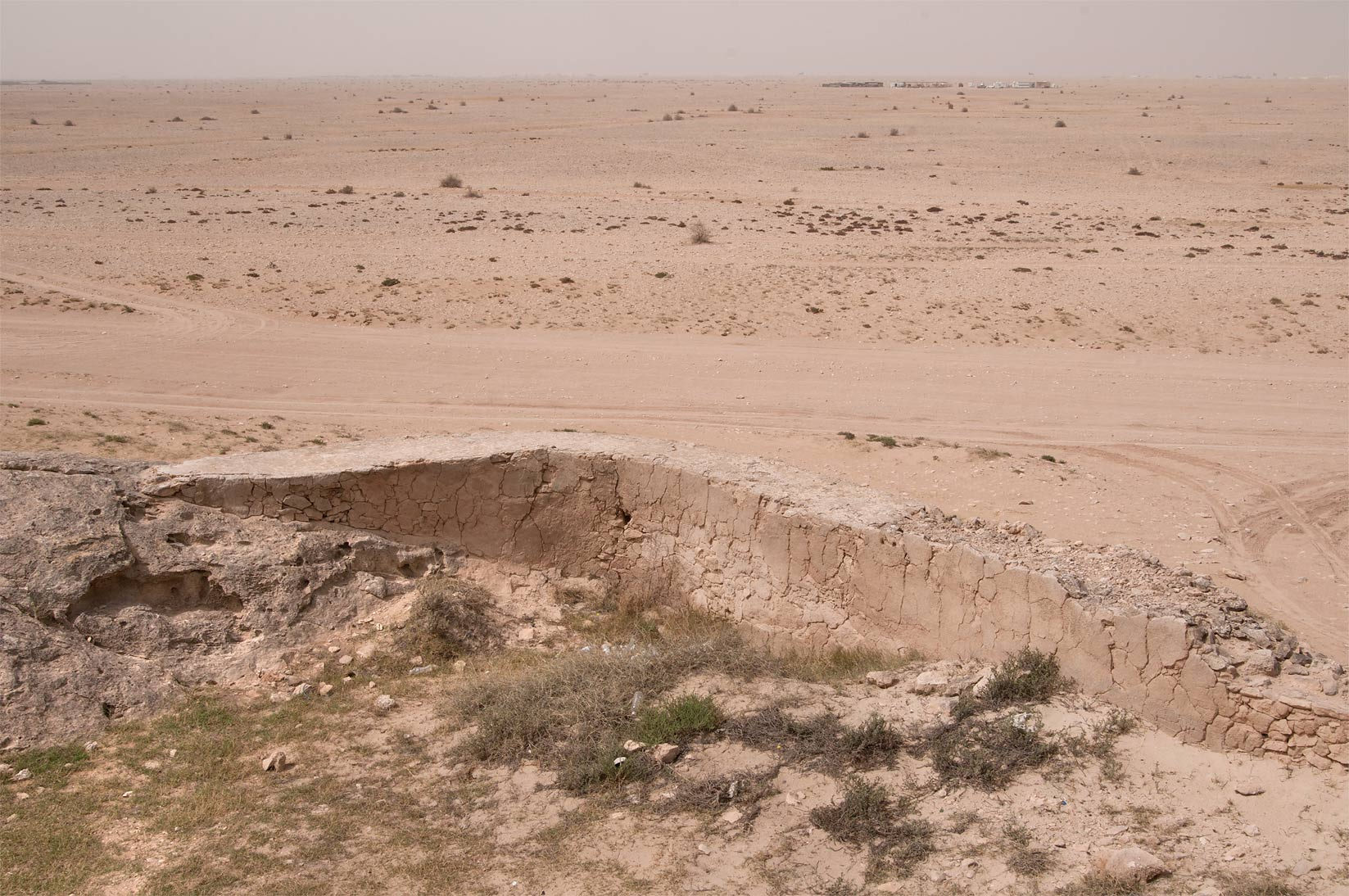
The large stone structure recorded in Jebel Fuwayrit, likely built as a dam

A rather large stone wall was built on the western side of ridge of Jebel Fuwayrit. While the purpose of this structure is unknown, it is speculated that it was constructed sometime in the 20th century to help accumulate rain water and surface run-off from the jebel.

=== Wildlife ===
Together with Ras Laffan, Fuwayrit accommodates approximately 30% of all sea turtle nests in Qatar. Fuwayrit Beach is reported as offering the best protection to turtle eggs anywhere in the country, with 14 nests being preserved in 2012. The area's natural geography offers a suitable breeding ground for sea turtles, particularly within its sandspits. During the sea turtle breeding season (late Spring and early Summer), the Ministry of Municipality and Environment closes the beach to visitors and periodically patrols the area.

Fuwayrit Beach is a popular bird-watching site. The intertidal sandflats and lagoonal mudflats off the coast are important habitats for migratory seabirds. Furthermore, there a number of low nabkhas, reaching a maximum of height of about 1.5 m (5 ft), that host various seabird populations. A short-term survey in 2013 recorded upwards of 53 bird species off the coast.

Significant mangrove communities exist off the coast. In the later 20th and 21st century, the area of mangroves drastically increased, likely resulting from lower grazing pressure once the area became partially abandoned.

=== Jebel Fuwayrit ===
Jebel Fuwayrit is a low, rocky hill formed by wind-blown deposits and is believed to date back to the end of the Late Pleistocene period. As a result of marine transgression (Eemian transgression), more recent wind-blown deposits have formed a stony ridge running for 2.5 km (1.6 mi) along the coastline with a high point of approximately 18 meters (59 ft).

== Archaeology ==
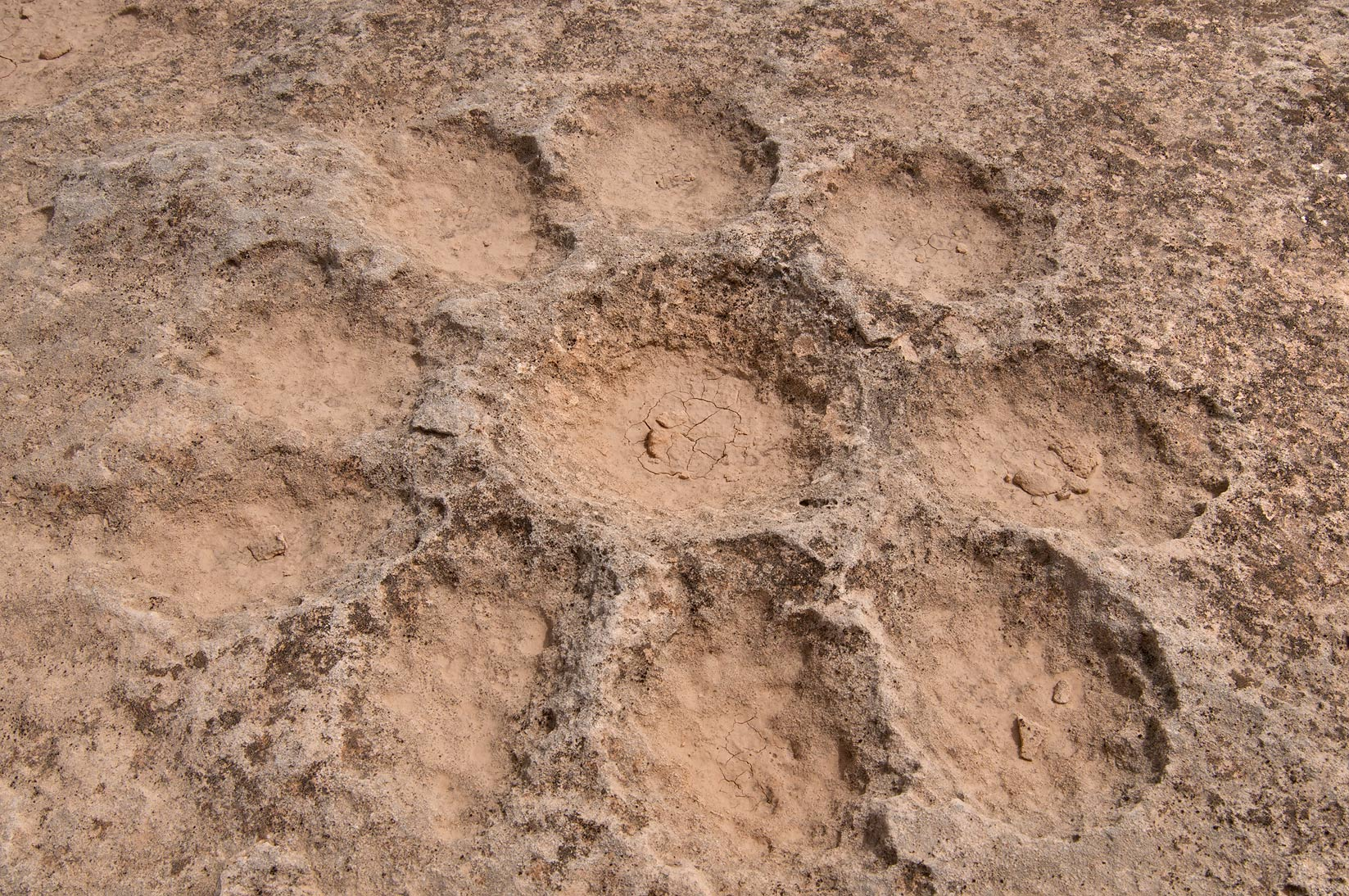
Rosette-patterned cup marks in Jebel Fuwayrit

Danish archaeologist Hans Kapel recorded at least 100 different rock carvings at Jebel Fuwayrit during his 1983 survey. Cup marks are among the most common type of rock art, with some serving functional purposes such as being used as game boards. Such uses are relatively uncommon elsewhere in the world. Furthermore, some cup marks may have been used for pearl sorting. Boat-like petroglyphs were also observed.

These rock carvings are mainly centered at the highest point of the ridge of Jebel Fuwayrit, which would have offered the best vantage point of incoming pearling vessels. They are also found, albeit less commonly, at the lower portions. It is probable that there are some yet-unrecorded rock carvings concealed by the small sand dunes scattered throughout the jebel.

Alongside some of the historic carvings is modern Arabic graffiti that was scrawled during the 20th and 21st centuries.

== Tourism ==
Fuwayrit is known for its beach located on the outskirts of the village, which has developed a reputation as a kiteboarding center. In 2022, Hilton Worldwide opened the 50-key Fuwairit Kite Beach Resort, a part of the Tapestry Collection brand, which specifically caters to kiteboarders.
