= List of beaches in Bahrain =

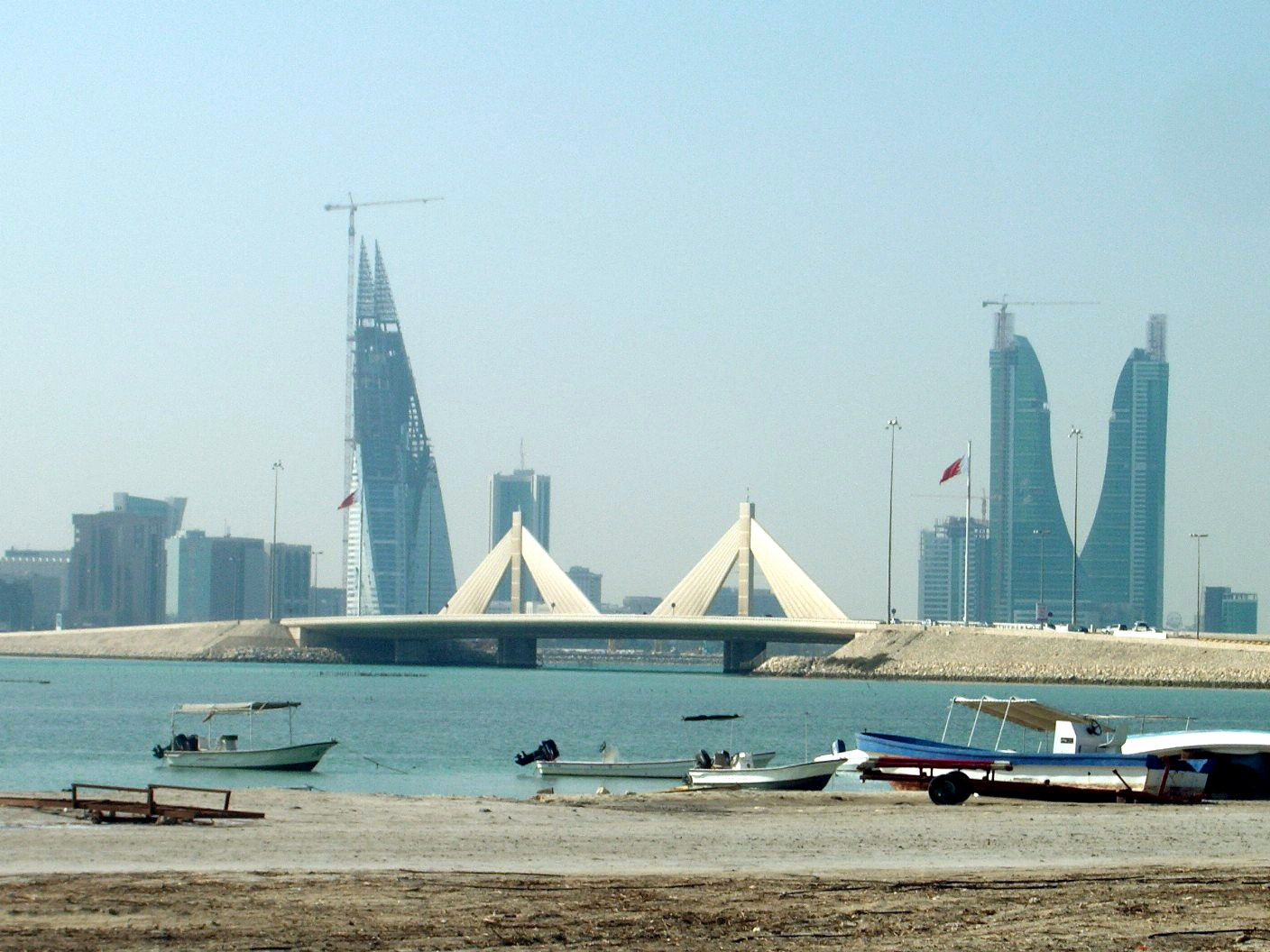
One of the many beaches dotting the island

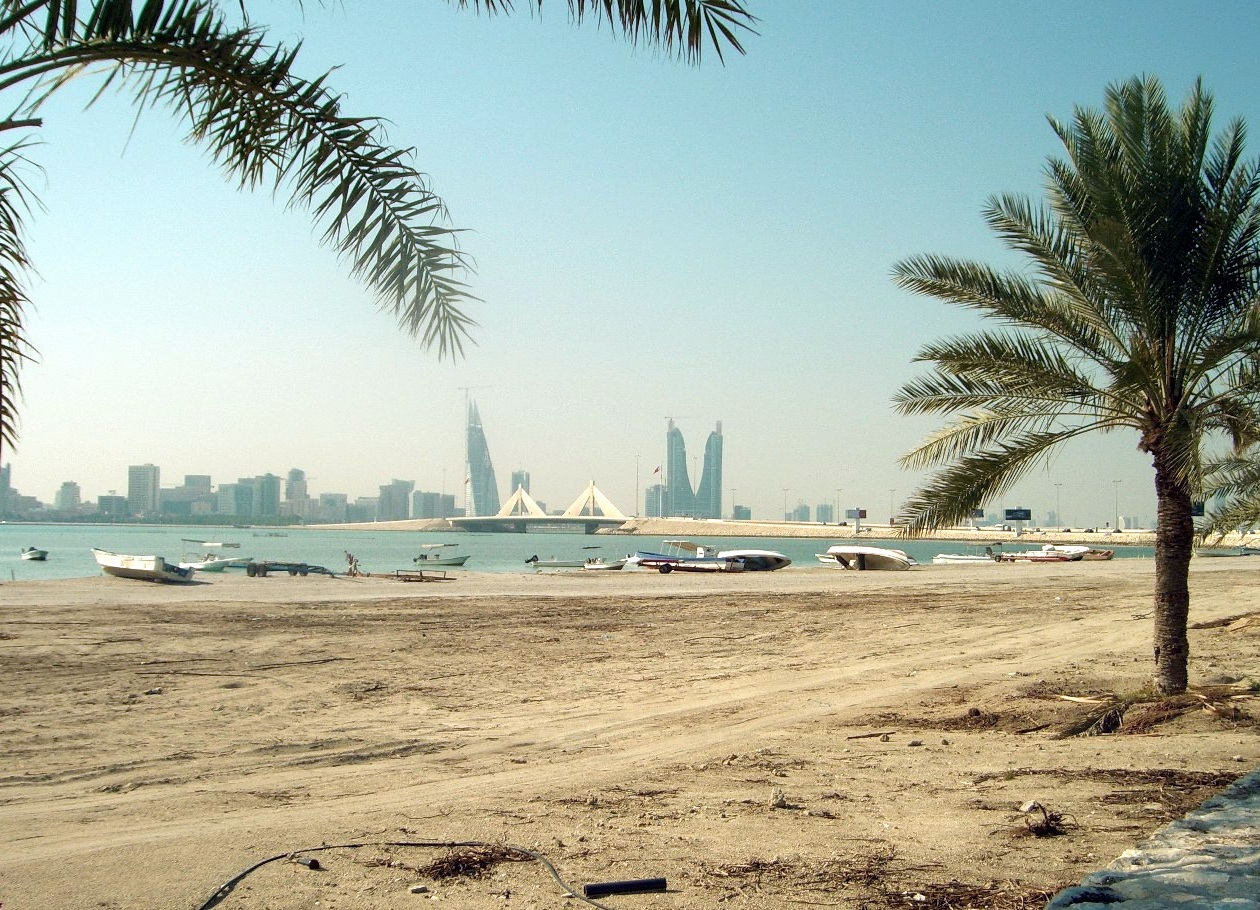
Example of a beach in Bahrain

This is a list of beaches in the Kingdom of Bahrain. Bahrain is an island and private beaches are abundant. Bahrain is a popular destination with tourists in the GCC.

Public Beaches

- Manama Corniche
- Sitra Beach near the Sitra lagoon.
- Bahrain Al Beach
- Bahrain Amwaj Beach
- Bahrain Arad Fort Beach
- Bahrain Hidd Beach
- Bahrain Jazair Beach
- Bahrain Karbabad Beach
  Private Beaches
- Solymar Beach Amwaj Island
- Bahrain Ritz Carlton Beach
- Bahrain Coral Bay Beach
- Novotel Bahrain Al Dana Resort Beach
- Bahrain Hawar Islands Beach
- Bahrain Jarada Island Beach
- Sofitel Bahrain Zallaq Thalassa Beach Sea & Spa

== Southern Bahrain ==
- Bapco Beach
- Sanabis Beach
- Zallaq Beach

== Hawar Islands ==
- Hawar Islands beach and resorts

== See also ==
- List of beaches
