= Al Thawawida =

Arab Tribe

The Al-Thawawda (Arabic: الذواودة) or Al-Thawadi (Arabic: الذوادي) is an Arab tribe in the Arab States of the Persian Gulf, particularly in the region of Bahrain, Qatar, and Eastern Province, Saudi Arabia. The Al Thawawda are a sub-clan of the Bani Khalid tribe.

In Bahrain, the family is based in Al Hidd and Muharraq. Many family members were involved in the lucrative pearl hunting industry.

The Al Thawawda are among those clans that moved to Bahrain from Zubarah following the 1783 Bani Utbah invasion of Bahrain.

Among the famous members of the family are leftist political activist Ahmad Al-Thawadi, and the founder of the Housing Bank, Isa Bin Sultan Al Thawadi, and CEO of the Qatar 2022 World Cup Bid Hassan Bin Abdulla Al Thawadi.
