= Majeed Marhoon =

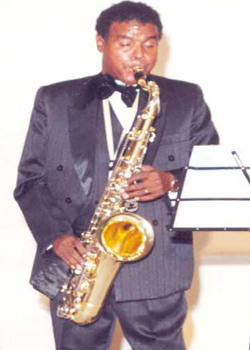

Background information
- Born: 17 August 1945
- Died: 16 March 2010 (aged 64)
- Genres: Jazz, Rock
- Occupation: Musician
- Instrument: Saxophone
- Years active: 1956 – 2010

Majeed Marhoon (Arabic: مجيد مرهون; 17 August 1945 – 16 March 2010) was a Bahraini saxophonist, and a former leftist political activist with the National Liberation Front of Bahrain.

== See also ==
- March Intifada
- National Liberation Front of Bahrain
