= Ahmad Al-Thawadi =

Ahmad Ibrahim Al-Thawadi (Arabic: احمد إبراهيم الذوادي) was the chairman of the Democratic Progressive Tribune, a leftist political party in the Kingdom of Bahrain. He was born in 1938 during the British colonization of Bahrain. He was also a founding member of the National Liberation Front. He used the nom de guerre 'Saif bin Ali' (Arabic: سيف بن علي).

He was one of the first victims of the State Security Law (anti-human rights law that was cancelled in the democratic era of the kingdom). Many Bahrainis believe Dhawadi enriched the political movement in Bahrain even when he was in exile in Asian and African countries and later in Latin America.

In the eighties, he married Bahraini poet Hamda Khamees and had a daughter Reem and a son Qais.

With the advent of Bahrain's political reforms and King Hamad Bin Eisa Al Khalifa's call for Bahraini politicians to come back from exile, Dhawadi came to Bahrain in 2001 to start a new era of political activities in a democratic country. Dhawadi supported the reforms and fought those who were against democratic projects. Dhawadi's lifelong sufferings in prisons and exile were aimed at fulfilling his dream for a better future for the younger generations.

In 1994, he was diagnosed with colon cancer and in the last years of his life he underwent many operations. He died of the illness on July 8, 2006.

== See also ==
- Al Thawawida
