= Qal'at Murair =

Fort in Qatar

Qal'at Murair (also Qal'at Im Murair, Arabic: قلعة مرير) is a ruined and deserted fortified castle located 2.4 kilometres (1.5 mi) from the south eastern part of the town of Zubarah.

== History ==
Qal'at Murair was built by families of the Utub confederation after their arrival to Zubarah from Kuwait in the 18th century. It was built in attempt to thwart off challenges by the Al Musallam branch of the Bani Khalid, who ruled over most of Qatar. They initiated the 1783 Utub invasion of Bahrain from the fort. After the completion of nearby Al Zubarah Fort in 1938, it was decommissioned. Its remnants were used to construct the Zubarah Fort.

== Description of the fort ==
This castle was built 1,500 metres (4,900 ft) outside the town of Zubarah with a channel and four walls lying between the town and the fort as well as a cemetery some 2,100 metres (6,900 ft) outside the town. It was a fortified and was built to oversee and protect the town from any invaders. Inside the fort was a masjid known as Murair Masjid as well a well two fathoms deep, and outside the fort there are five wells one fathom deep, and all of its water is fresh.

== See also ==
- Bani Utbah
- Zubarah
