= Al Zubara Fort =

Fort in Qatar

- حصن الزبارة
- Zubarah in Qatar
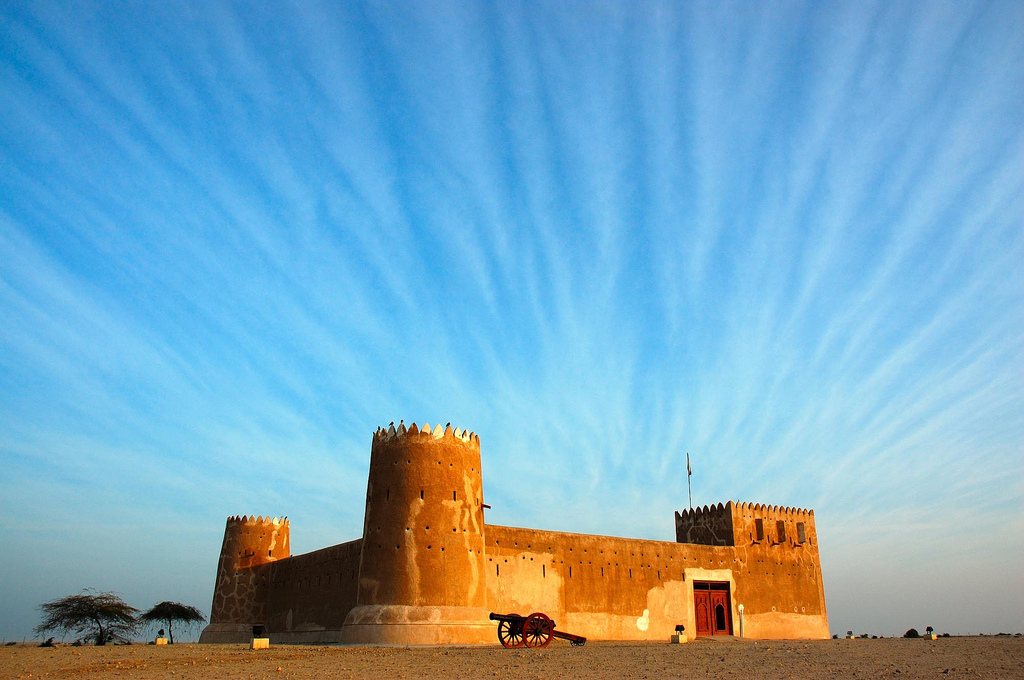
- Al Zubara Fort.

Site information
- Type: Historical fortress
- Owner: Qatar Government; Ministry of Tourism, Qatar Museums Authority
- Open to the public: Yes
- Condition: Intact

Location
- Coordinates: 25.9769°N 51.0454°E

Site history
- Built: 1938
- Built by: Sheikh Abdullah bin Jassim Al Thani
- In use: 1938–mid 1980s
- Materials: Compressed mud, coral rock, gypsum plaster, limestone, and wood

Tour of Qatar Women 2012 map, showing Al Zubara fort on northwestern part of the map.

Al Zubara Fort (Arabic: حصن الزبارة; also spelled as Zubarah Fort) is a historic military fortress located in Zubarah, northern Qatar. It was built under the oversight of Sheikh Abdullah bin Jassim Al Thani in 1938 in the aftermath of the 1937 Qatari–Bahraini conflict.

== History ==
Following the 1937 Qatari–Bahraini conflict, Al Zubara Fort was built by Sheikh Abdullah bin Jassim Al Thani in 1938 to serve as a Coast Guard station, although some claim that it was built to serve as a police station. It was built partially from the remnants of the ruined Qal'at Murair, which it effectively replaced. It was later converted into a museum to display diverse exhibits and artwork, especially for contemporarily topical archaeological findings.

== Geography ==
Al Zubara Fort is situated in the ancient town of Zubarah, which in turn is located on the northwestern coast of the Qatari Peninsula in the Al Shamal municipality, and is about 105 km (65 mi) north of Doha, the capital of Qatar.

== Structure ==
Al Zubara Fort has a square courtyard surrounded by walls on all sides. The walls are 1 metre (3.3 ft) thick and were built by stacking pieces of coral rock and limestone using mud as a mortar, then coating the stack in a gypsum-based plaster. Three of the fort's corners have round towers with Qatari-style battlements whilst the fourth has a rectangular tower with machicolations. There's a 15 metres (49 ft) deep well in the courtyard.

Eight rooms on the ground floor, which originally housed soldiers, are now used to house exhibits.

== Gallery ==
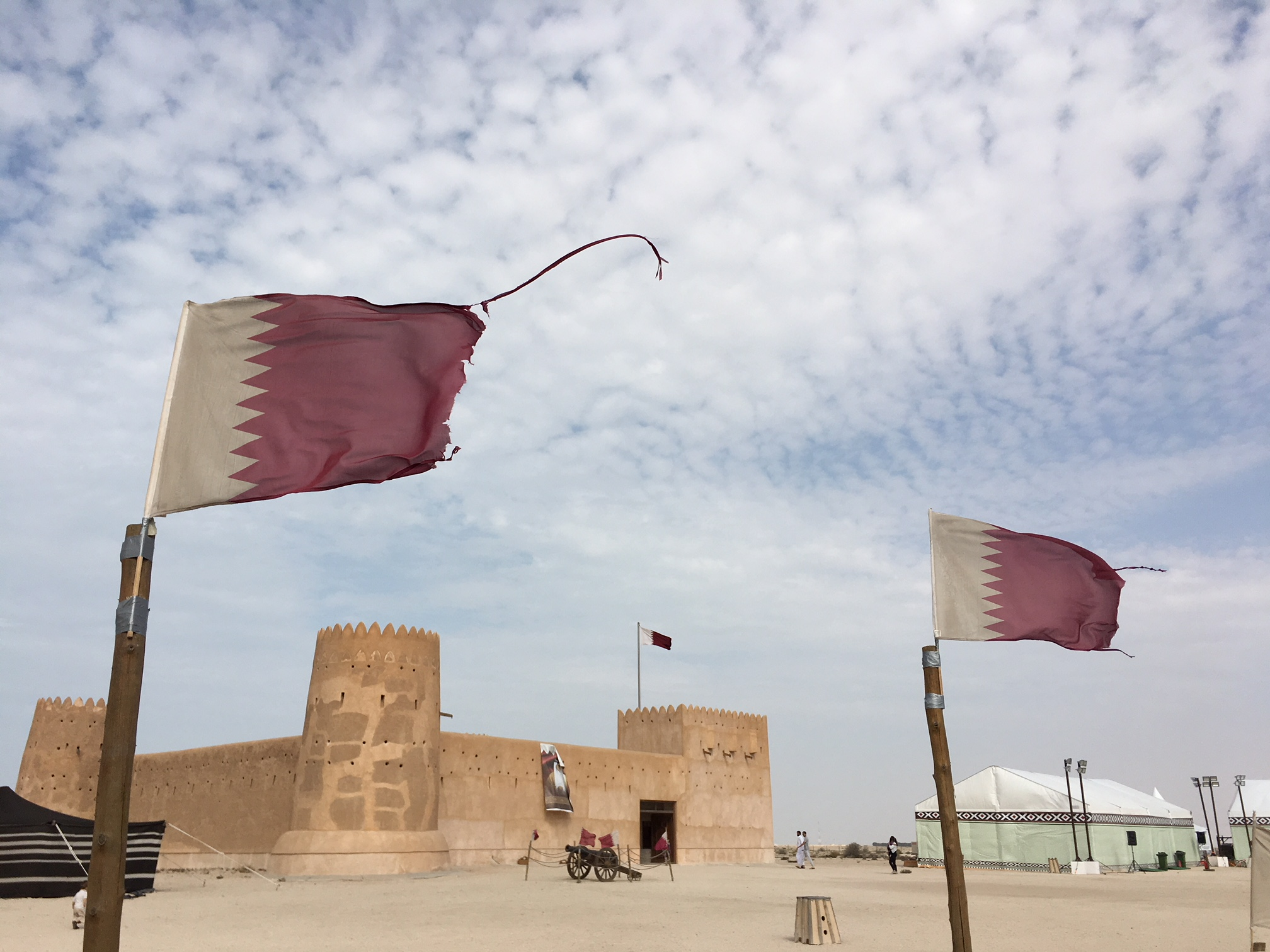
Al Zubarah Fort

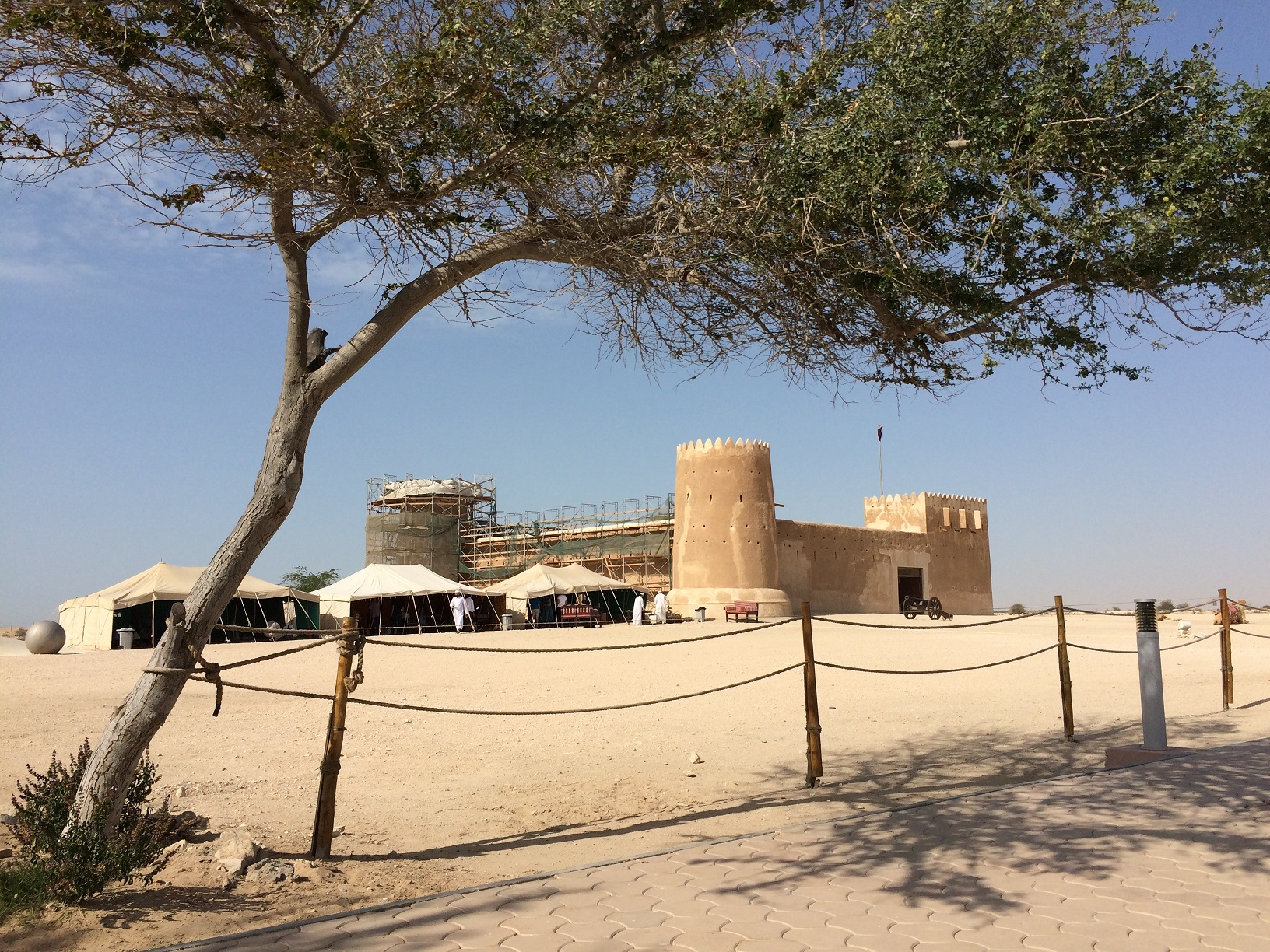
Restoration activities in 2015 at the fort

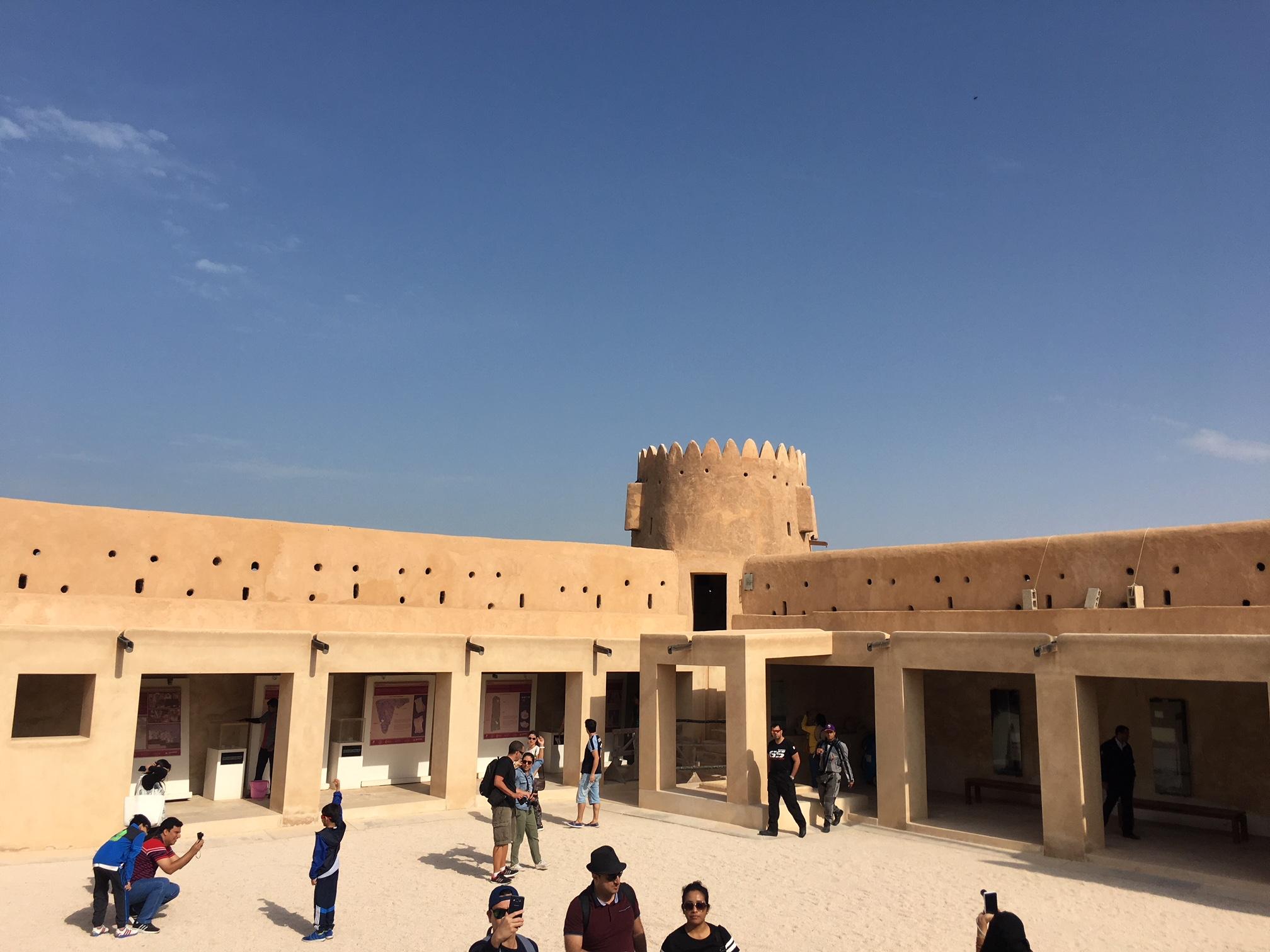
Al Zubarah Fort

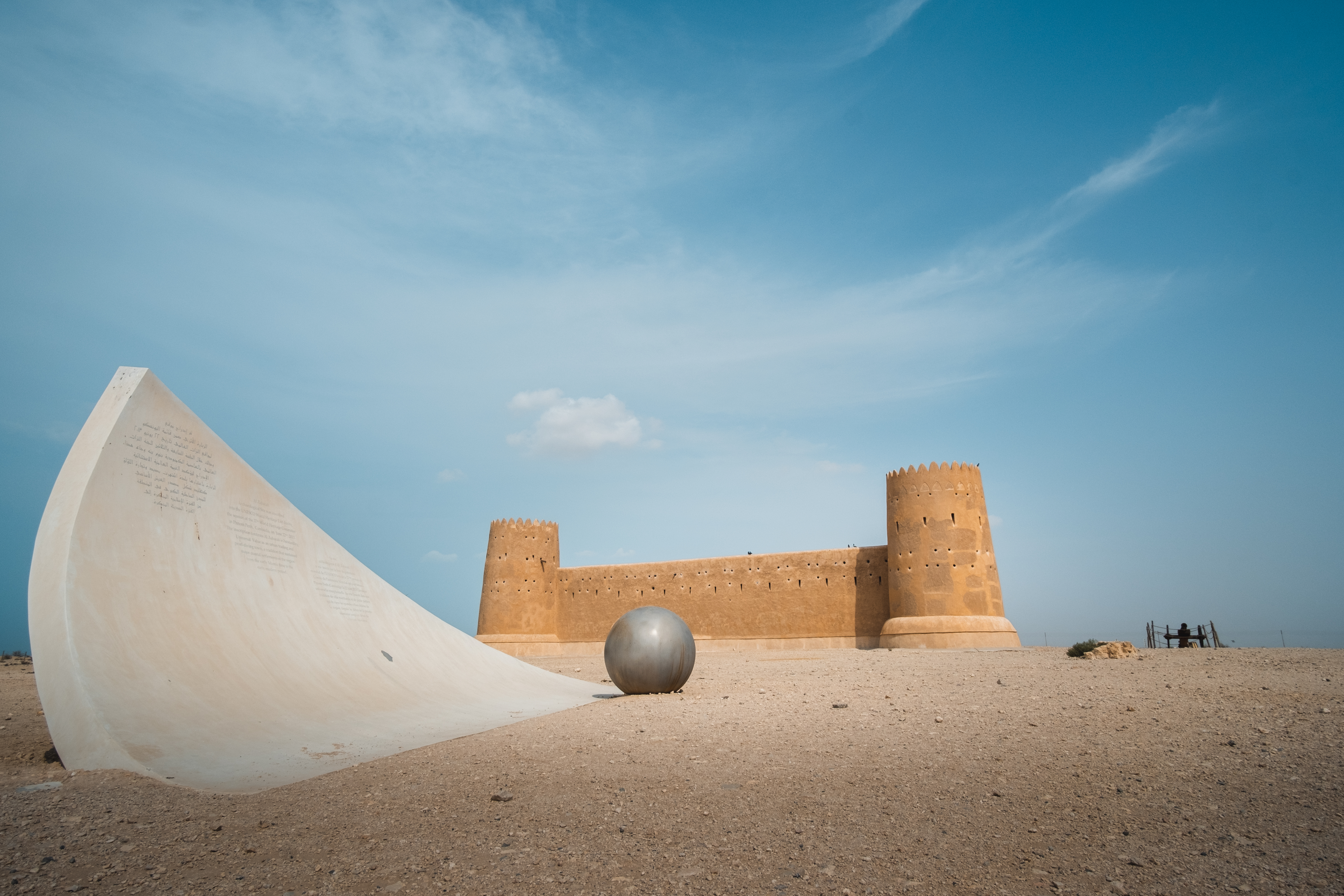
Al Zubarah Fort

== See also ==
- Barzan Tower
- Al Koot Fort
