= National Liberation Front – Bahrain =

National Liberation Front – Bahrain جبهة التحرير الوطني—البحرين
- Founded: 15 February 1955
- Ideology: Communism; Marxism-Leninism; Republicanism
- Political position: Far-left
- International affiliation: IMCWP
- Council of Representatives: 0 / 40
- Shura Council: 0 / 40

The National Liberation Front—Bahrain (Arabic: جبهة التحرير الوطني—البحرين) is a Marxist-Leninist party in Bahrain. It was founded on 15 February 1955, the first leftist party in the Arab states of the Persian Gulf. Among the founder-members were Hassan Nezam (1922–1958), the principal founder, who was killed in Tehran in 1958 by SAVAK. (Hassan Nezam was also a leading regional figure in the Tudeh Party of Iran, Khuzestan province, under the name Hassan Dorood.) Other founders were Erik Mansoorian, who died in Abadan after returning to Iran in 1964, Hassan M. Saleh (1926–2000), who from the early 1960s was in a state of chronic mental dysfunction as a result of severe torture, Ali Madan (1932–1995), Ahmed al-Thawadi, “Saif Bin Ali” (1937–2006), and Ali Dawaigher (1938-2013).

== History ==
In the 1960s and 70s the NLF, headed by Saif Bin Ali, assisted by Yousif Ajaji (born 1939) and Abdulla Rashid Binali (born 1935), played a leading part in two major events: the March Intifada (uprising) of 1965, in which nationalist forces rose up against British colonialism, and the labour movement of the early 1970s. The first event led eventually to the independence of Bahrain from the British in 1971; the second event accelerated the move towards a significant improvement in the political atmosphere and the emergence of the first parliament in Bahrain and the first constitution (the 1973 constitution).

By the first half of the 1970s the NLF was the major political force in the country, and following the 1973 election it had eight members in the Bahrain National Assembly (parliament) or 40% of elected MPs (30 were elected and 14 appointed). In 1975, however, the Assembly was dissolved and the constitution suspended. The NLF was harshly repressed by the regime, and many activists and leaders went into exile. The most severe assault came in the mid-80s, specifically in 1986, with the decision of the regime to crush the NLF. Almost the whole clandestine organisation collapsed, some members died under torture, and a large number were sentenced to long terms of imprisonment after false and illegal confessions.

In spite of the unprecedented political circumstances that faced the surviving activists of the NLF, a handful of fighters remained, though in different method of activity. One can see their fingerprints on the events of the 1990s called the “constitutional movement.”

== Elections ==
In the early 2000s, after a change in the regime's policy, exiled leaders were allowed to return to Bahrain and to work politically. Before the 2002 election some elements affiliated to the NLF, in co-operation with other independent activists (leftists and liberals), launched a legal political body under a new rule governing the establishment of political associations. In this way the Progressive Democratic Tribune Association (PDTA) was founded as a leftist progressive political organisation, but not as an alternative to the NLF. Since then it may appear that the PDTA has replaced the NLF, a groundless claim for which there is no documentary evidence. Moreover, the NLF never issued any statement that it has ceased to exist. The reality is that the NLF continues to exist and to struggle, though illegal and not openly active, because of the continued repression of opposition groups by the Bahrain state.

Following the 2002 election, the NLF and PDTA had three members in parliament, including the deputy speaker, Abdulhadi Marhoon. However, they lost all seats at the 2006 election when Sunni and Shi‘a communal “Islamist” forces won almost all seats.

== See also ==
- Ahmad Al-Thawadi
- List of political parties in Bahrain
- March Intifada
- Majeed Marhoon
- National Union Committee
