= Abdullah bin Jassim Al Thani =

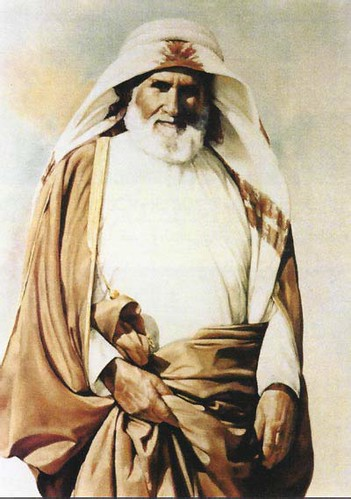

Emir of Qatar
- Reign: 1913–1949
- Predecessor: Jassim bin Mohammed Al Thani
- Successor: Ali bin Abdullah
- Born: 11 February 1871; Doha, Qatar
- Died: 25 April 1957 (aged 86)
- Burial: Al Rayyan Cemetery
- Spouse: Maryam bint Abdullah Al Attiyah (first) Sheikha bint Jabran Al Buainain (second)
- Issue: Ali; Hamad; Hassan
- House: Al Thani
- Father: Jassim bin Mohammed
- Religion: Sunni Islam

Styles of The Emir of Qatar
- Reference style: His Highness
- Spoken style: Your Highness
- Alternative style: Sheikh

Abdullah bin Jassim bin Mohammed Al Thani (Arabic: عبد الله بن جاسم بن محمد آل ثاني; (11 February 1871 – 25 April 1957), also known as Sheikh Abdullah bin Jassim Al Thani or Sheikh Abdullah bin Qassim Al Thani, was the Emir of Qatar from 1913 to 1949.

Oil was discovered in Qatar for the first time during his rule.

== Biography ==
=== Early life and reign ===
According to the Amiri Diwan of Qatar, Sheikh Abdullah bin Jassim Al Thani was born in 1871 in al-Bidda to Sheikh Jassim bin Mohammed Al Thani. He had eighteen siblings, with him being the 5th eldest.

He came to the throne in 1913. Some official Qatari and United Nations sources say that Abdullah sidestepped in favour of his son, crown prince Hamad bin Abdullah Al Thani, in 1940, assuming the office of emir once again after Hamad's death in 1948. In contrast, as of 2026, the Amiri Diwan of Qatar holds that Abdullah ruled uninterrupted from 1913 to 1949, and that Hamad bin Abdullah died in 1948 while he was "heir apparent". According to the Washington Institute for Near East Policy, Hamad "served as de facto ruler of Qatar" 1940-1948. The sources agree that Abdullah stayed in power until 1949, abdicating in favour of his eldest son, Ali bin Abdullah Al Thani.

=== Contributions ===
==== Ottoman Empire and Great Britain era ====
- Great Britain and the Ottoman Empire recognised Sheikh Abdullah and his successors' right to rule over the whole of the Qatari Peninsula. The Ottomans renounced all their rights to Qatar and following the outbreak of the First World War; Sheikh Abdullah forced the Ottomans to abandon Doha on 19 August 1915.

===== Treaties for protection =====
- On 3 November 1916, Britain, to bring Qatar under its Trucial System of Administration, signed a treaty with Sheikh Abdullah. Sheikh Abdullah agreed not to enter into any relations with any other power without prior consent of the British Government and Percy Zachariah Cox, the Political Resident in the Persian Gulf, who signed the treaty on behalf of his government, guaranteed the protection of Qatar 'from all aggression by sea'.
- On 5 May 1935, Sheikh Abdullah obtained Britain's agreement for the protection of Qatar from inside as well as any attacks from external forces.

==== Structures built ====
- In 1927, Sheikh Abdullah built Al Koot Fort, also known as Doha Fort, in the Al Bidda neighbourhood, in the midst of Souq Waqif, near Doha Corniche, in Doha, the capital city and state of Qatar, to serve as a police station, at the same time, to protect the Souq Waqif from thieves.
- In 1938, in response to the 1937 Qatari–Bahraini conflict, Sheikh Abdullah built Al Zubara Fort. It is located in the town of Zubarah, in the Al Shamal municipality, on the northwestern coast of the Qatari peninsula, about 105 km (65 mi) from Doha.

==== Discovery of oil ====
- Following British recognition of Sheikh Hamad, the second son of Sheikh Abdullah as the Heir Apparent of Qatar, Sheikh Abdullah signed the first Oil Concession Agreement with the Anglo-Persian Oil Company on 17 May 1935. Drilling of the first well in Qatar began in October 1938 and the discovery of oil was made at the Dukhan structure in January 1940. However, the oil wells were capped as the Second World War progressed.
- Sheikh Abdullah's last act as ruler was the signing of a Seabed Concession with Central Mining and Investment Corporation Ltd. on 5 August 1949. He died on 25 April 1957.

==== Appointment of the next emir ====
- On 30 June 1948, Sheikh Abdullah appointed Sheikh Ali Bin Abdullah Al-Thani as the Deputy Ruler of Qatar, following the death of Sheikh Hamad on 27 May 1948, and after abdicating for his eldest son.

=== Marriage and children ===
Sheikh Abdullah's first wife was Sheikha Maryam bint Abdullah Al Attiyah. He had a second wife named Sheikha Fatima bint Isa Al Thani, who was a daughter of Sheikh Isa bin Thamer Al Thani, to whom he bore his third son, Sheikh Hassan bin Abdullah Al Thani. In total, Sheikh Abdullah bin Jassim Al Thani had three sons.

- Sheikh Ali bin Abdullah Al Thani
- Sheikh Hamad bin Abdullah Al Thani
- Sheikh Hassan bin Abdullah Al Thani

== Retirement and death ==
In August 1949, Sheikh Abdullah bin Jassim Al Thani abdicated and appointed his eldest son as ruler of the Qatar Peninsula, immediately moving 8.0 km (5 mi) from Doha to an oasis village to retire. He was said to be aging rapidly in body but was still mentally alert. His main complaint was a hardening or stiffening of the joints, or general paralysis of the body. Periodically, the American Mission doctors would treat the sheikh when able, and he also hired his own foreign doctors. He died on 25 April 1957 of natural causes.

== See also ==
- Al Koot Fort
- Jassim bin Mohammed Al Thani
- Percy Cox
- Zubarah Fort

Abdullah bin Jassim Al Thani House of Thani Born: 1880 Died: 25 April 1957
Regnal titles
Preceded by Jassim bin Mohammed Al Thani	Emir of Qatar; 1913–1949	Succeeded by Ali bin Abdullah Al Thani
