= Al Koot Fort =

Fortress in Doha, Qatar

Al Koot Fort Doha Fort
- قلعة الكوت
- Near Souq Waqif, Doha, Qatar
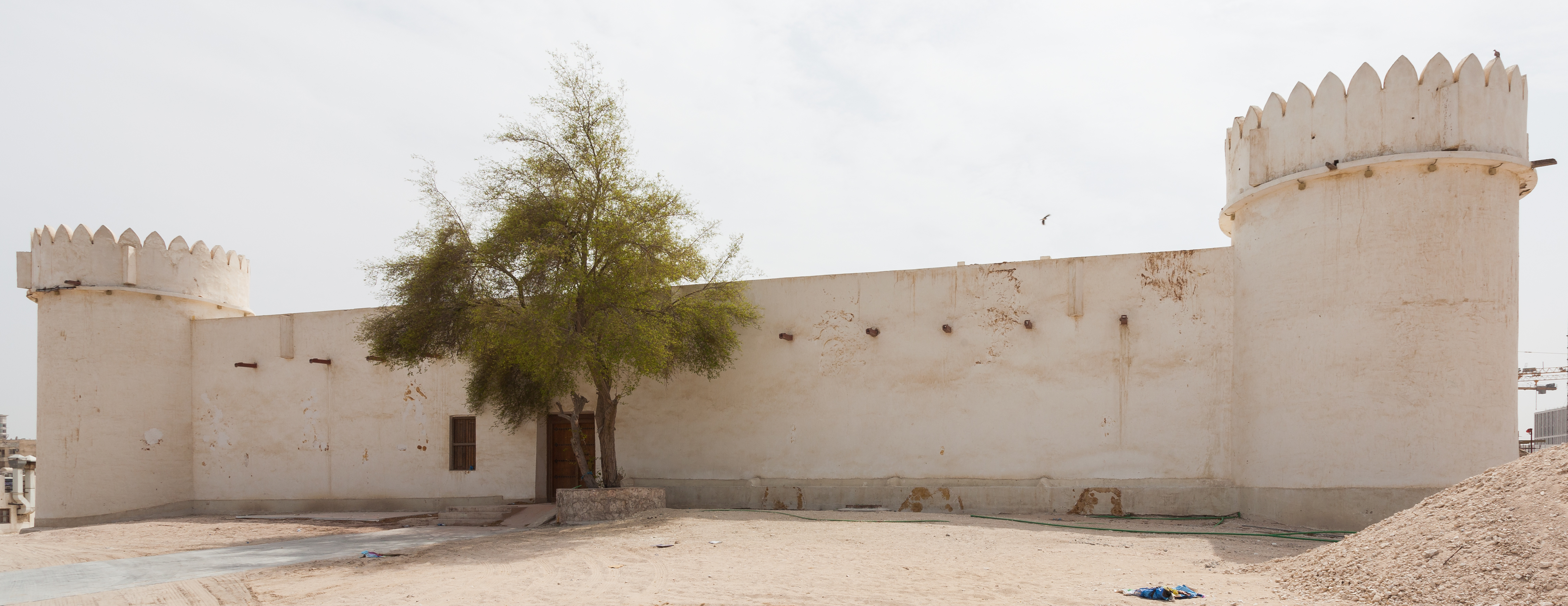
- The fort in 2013

Site information
- Type: Historical fort
- Owner: Qatari Government; Ministry of Tourism, Qatar Museums Authority
- Controlled by: 1938–present: Qatar

Location
- Coordinates: 25.2866°N 51.5309°E

Site history
- Built: 1880
- Built by: Sheikh Abdullah bin Jassim Al Thani
- In use: 1927–1977: police station, jail, military fort 1978–present: museum

Al Koot Fort, commonly known as the Doha Fort, is a historical military fortress located in the heart of Doha, Qatar's capital city. It was built in 1927 by Sheikh Abdulla bin Qassim Al Thani, better known as Sheikh Abdullah bin Jassim Al Thani, who ruled Qatar from 1913 until 1949, after Sheikh Mohammed bin Jassim Al Thani, Sheikh Abdullah's brother, abdicated in favor of him. The fort was later converted into a museum.

Qatari traditional handicrafts, products and photos of daily life with illustrations are housed in the fort. Exhibits and artworks include handicrafts, gypsum and wooden ornaments, fishing equipment and boats, historical photos and paintings including oil paintings of craft workers and daily life.

== History ==
The Al Koot Fort was rebuilt in 1927 by Sheikh Abdulla bin Qassim Al Thani, after it was abandoned by the Ottomans. It was originally built to serve as a police station in 1880 and afterwards used as a jail in 1906, although some sources claim that the fort was built by Sheikh Abdulla to protect the Souq Waqif from notorious thieves. It was one of the most important forts during that time.

It was renovated in 1978.

== Geography ==
The Al Koot Fort is located in the Al Bidda neighborhood, in the midst of the famous Souq Waqif, near Doha Corniche, and is now a landmark, museum and tourist spot, especially for foreigners.

== See also ==
- Zubarah Fort
- Barzan Tower
