= March Intifada =

1965 left-wing uprising against British presence in Bahrain

- Date: March – April 1965
- Location: Bahrain
- Caused by: Laying off hundreds of workers at the Bahrain Petroleum Company
- Goals: Ending the British presence in Bahrain
- Methods: Strikes Demonstrations Civil resistance
- Result: Independence of Bahrain in 1971

Parties
Leftists and students: National Liberation Front – Bahrain	Colonial Bahrain government

Lead figures
Largely uncentralized leadership	

Casualties and losses
- 6 civilians killed

The March Intifada (Arabic: انتفاضة مارس) was an uprising that broke out in Bahrain in March 1965. The uprising was led by Leftist groups, the National Liberation Front – Bahrain calling for the end of the British presence in Bahrain and numerous notable individuals participated in the uprising, including Wa'ad political activist Ali Rabea. The uprising was sparked by the laying-off of hundreds of Bahraini workers at the Bahrain Petroleum Company on March 5, 1965. Several people died in the sometimes violent clashes between protesters and police.

== Background and main events ==
The uprising started when students of Manama High School, which then was the only high school in Bahrain, protested against the laying-off of hundreds of workers at BAPCO (Bahrain Petroleum Company), however, the protest was quickly suppressed by the infantry. The news of the crackdown created a nationwide uprising which would last for a month.

The uprising's motto was "Down down colonialism" (Arabic: يسقط يسقط الاستعمار)

=== Role of Muharraq in the uprising ===
Muharraq was a strong center of protests. The opposition managed to control the city for a few days, however, security forces entered it after clashes with residents. The people of Muharraq's resistance gave the city the nickname "Port Said", named after the Egyptian city that became famous during the 1956 Suez Crisis.

=== Deaths ===
On April 14, 1965, a civilian named Faisal Algassab was the first person to be killed as a result of participation in the Intifada. He was being chased by armed police officer Ahmad Alkhaloo who shot Algassab as he was returning to his residence, causing Algassab to scream in anguish, catching the attention of onlookers and spurring a large crowd at the scene. The officer continued to shoot Algassab until he was presumed dead, causing his blood to be splattered on the walls of his house. Five other individuals were killed due to participation in the protests, including Abdullah Saeed Alghanim, Jassim Khalil Abdullah, Abdullah Hussain Bunawda, Abdulnabi Sarhan, and Abdullah Marhoon.

== See also ==
- History of Bahrain
- National Union Committee
- 1990s uprising in Bahrain
- 2011 Bahraini uprising
- List of modern conflicts in the Middle East
