= Zubarah =

Ruined and deserted town in Al Shamal, Qatar

Zubarah الزبارة Al Zubarah Az Zubarah
- Ruined town
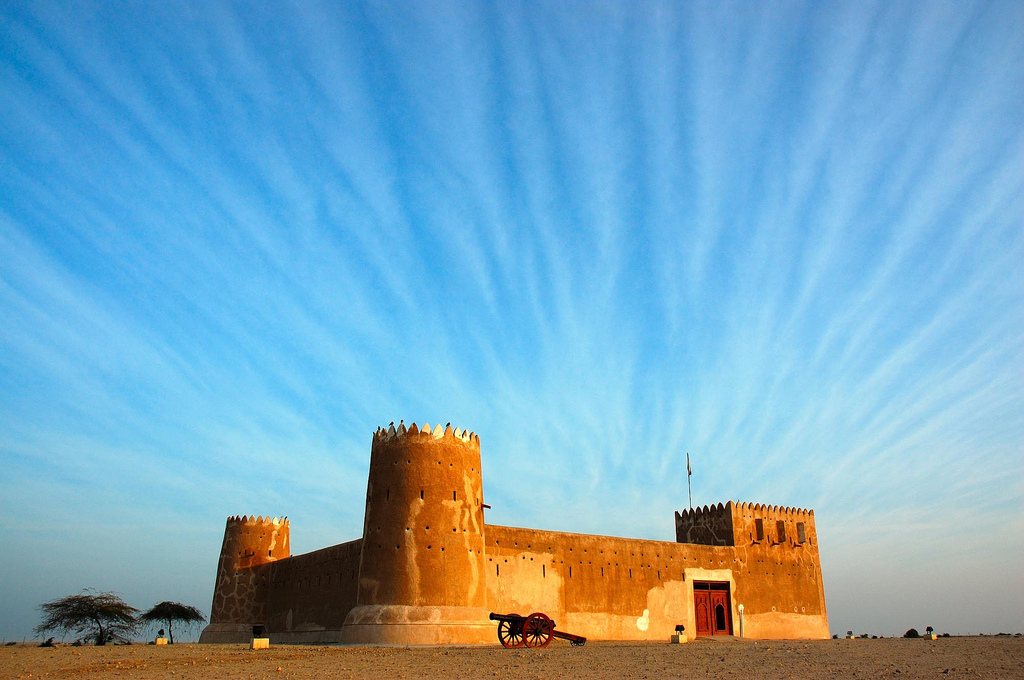
- The iconic Al Zubarah Fort.

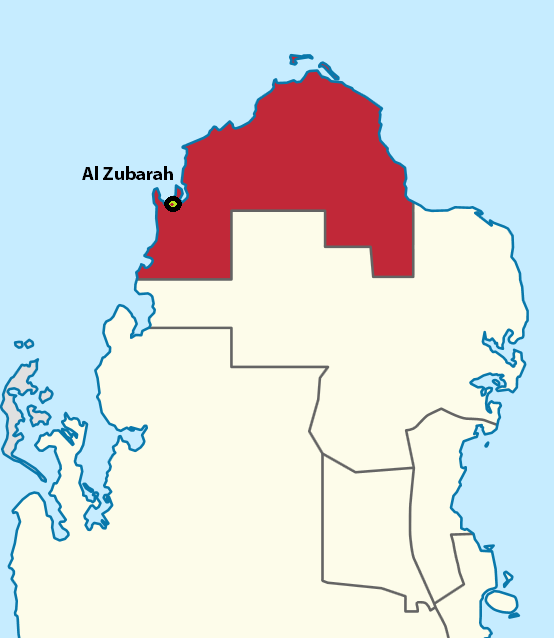
- Geographical location of Zubarah.

- Al Shamal in Qatar.

- Location within Qatar
- Coordinates: 25°58′43″N 51°01′35″E
- Country: Qatar
- Municipality: Al Shamal
- Zone no.: 78

Area
  - Total: 4.6 km^{2} (1.8 sq mi)
  - Land: 4 km^{2} (1.5 sq mi)
- Demonym(s): Zubaran; Al Zubaran

UNESCO World Heritage Site
- Official name: Al Zubarah Archaeological Site
- Type: Cultural
- Criteria: iii, iv, v
- Designated: 2013 (37th session)
- Reference no.: 1402
- Region: Western Asia

Zubarah (Arabic: الزبارة), also referred to as Al Zubarah or Az Zubarah, is a ruined, ancient town located on the northwestern coast of the Qatar peninsula in the Al Shamal municipality, about 65 miles or 105 kilometres from the capital Doha. It was founded by the Bani Utbah tribal confederation who migrated from Kuwait in the mid-eighteenth century. It was designated a UNESCO World Heritage Site in 2013.

It was once a successful center of global trade and pearl fishing positioned midway between the Strait of Hormuz and the west arm of the Persian Gulf. It is one of the most extensive and best-preserved examples of an 18th–19th century settlement in the region. The layout and urban fabric of the settlement have been preserved in a manner unlike any other settlements in the Persian Gulf, providing insight into the urban life, spatial organization, and the social and economic history of the Persian Gulf before the discovery of oil and gas in the 20th century.

Covering an area of around 400 hectares (60 hectares inside the outer town wall), Zubarah is Qatar's most substantial archaeological site. The site comprises the fortified town with a later inner and an earlier outer wall, a harbour, a sea canal, two screening walls, Qal'at Murair (Murair fort), and the more recent Al Zubara Fort.

== Etymology ==
The most widely accepted etymology of Zubarah links it the Arabic term for an elevated sand mound or small hill, a definition supported by the site's natural topography. The original settlement was established upon a raised area overlooking the sea, a feature that would have afforded both strategic advantage and visibility along the coastline. This interpretation is consistent with the Arabic usage of terms such as zuba (زُبى), which denotes high ground.

== History ==
=== Early history ===
During the early Islamic period, trade and commerce boomed in northern Qatar. Settlements began to appear on the coast, primarily between the towns of Zubarah and Umm Al Maa. A village dating back to the early Islamic period was discovered near the town.

Between September 1627 and April 1628, a Portuguese naval squadron led by D. Goncalo da Silveira set several neighboring coastal villages ablaze. Zubarah's settlement and growth during this period is attributed to the dislodging of people from these adjacent settlements.

=== Settlement ===
The origins of Zubarah are the subject of some historical dispute. The 1986 history book Qatar's Memorial claimed that a functioning, self-governing settlement existed in the area prior to the arrival of the Bani Utbah tribal confederation. It supported this claim by invoking two purported historical documents; however, they were later exposed as forgeries produced by Qatari authorities amid a territorial dispute with Bahrain over sovereignty of the site.

By contrast, the more widely accepted narrative places the foundation and rise of Zubarah within the broader context of the Bani Utbah migration. Sometime before 1698, the Bani Utbah clans, comprising families from the Anaza tribe including the Al Sabah, Al Khalifa, and Al Jalahma, migrated from the Najd region of central Arabia in response to prolonged drought. Their migration path took them through Al Aflaj, Qatif, and Al Ahsa, eventually reaching Freiha in northwestern Qatar, near the future site of Zubarah.

Upon settling in Freiha, the Utub formed an alliance with local Qatari tribes, most notably the Al-Maadeed, a powerful clan affiliated with Bani Khalid, as well as the Al Sulaim. This coalition became known as the Bani Utbah, which later expanded to include other Najdi and Banu Tamim families. They established Freiha as a fortified coastal hub with access to maritime trade routes and pearling waters. After successive military skirmishes with the dominant Al Musallam tribe, who were a Bani Khalid tribe under nominal Ottoman support, the Bani Utbah tribes were forced to depart to Iraq in 1716, followed by Kuwait.

In the mid-18th century, likely during the 1760s, several tribes of the Bani Utbah, including factions of the Al Bin Ali, Al-Maadeed and Al Jalahmah, returned to Qatar's northern coast and began to settle in Zubarah, approximately 100 metres (330 ft) from their earlier settlement at Freiha. By this time, the area had grown into a small but active coastal village. Its existence as a recognized port is attested in a 1766 manuscript of Lamʿ al-Shihāb fī Sīrat Muhammad ibn ʿAbd al-Wahhāb, which records that Sheikh Sulayman Al Humaid of the Bani Khalid issued an ultimatum forbidding trade between Uyayna and coastal settlements under his control, including Zubarah. The passage suggests that by the mid-18th century, Zubarah was already recognized as a port of economic significance within Bani Khalid territory.

Shortly thereafter, Sheikh Muhammad bin Khalifa of the Al Khalifa family migrated from Kuwait and was invited by the inhabitants of Zubarah, comprising various Bani Utbah tribes such as the Al Bin Ali and Al Jalahimah, to settle in the town. At the time, nearby Al Huwaila as well as several other northern settlements remained under the authority of the Al Musallam clan. As the Al Khalifa's influence in Zubarah expanded, they faced growing resistance from the Al Musallam leadership, who sought to reassert their authority.

=== Initial development ===
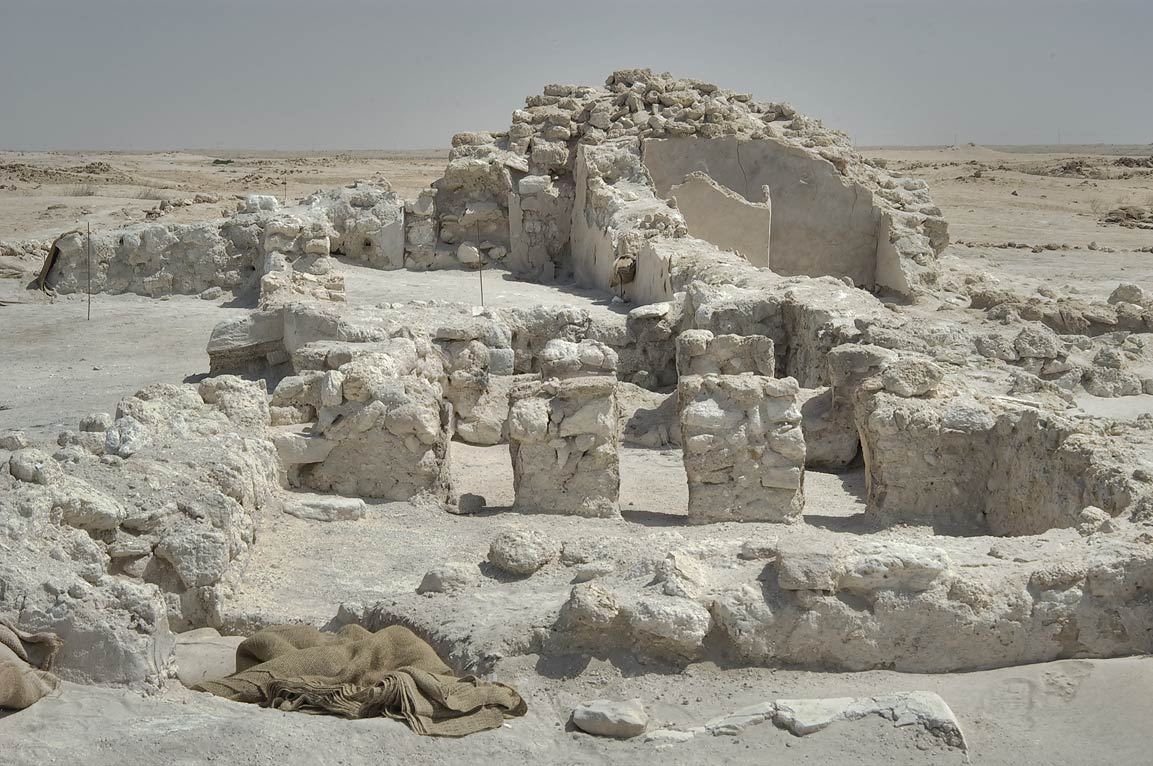
Ruined stone structures in Zubarah.

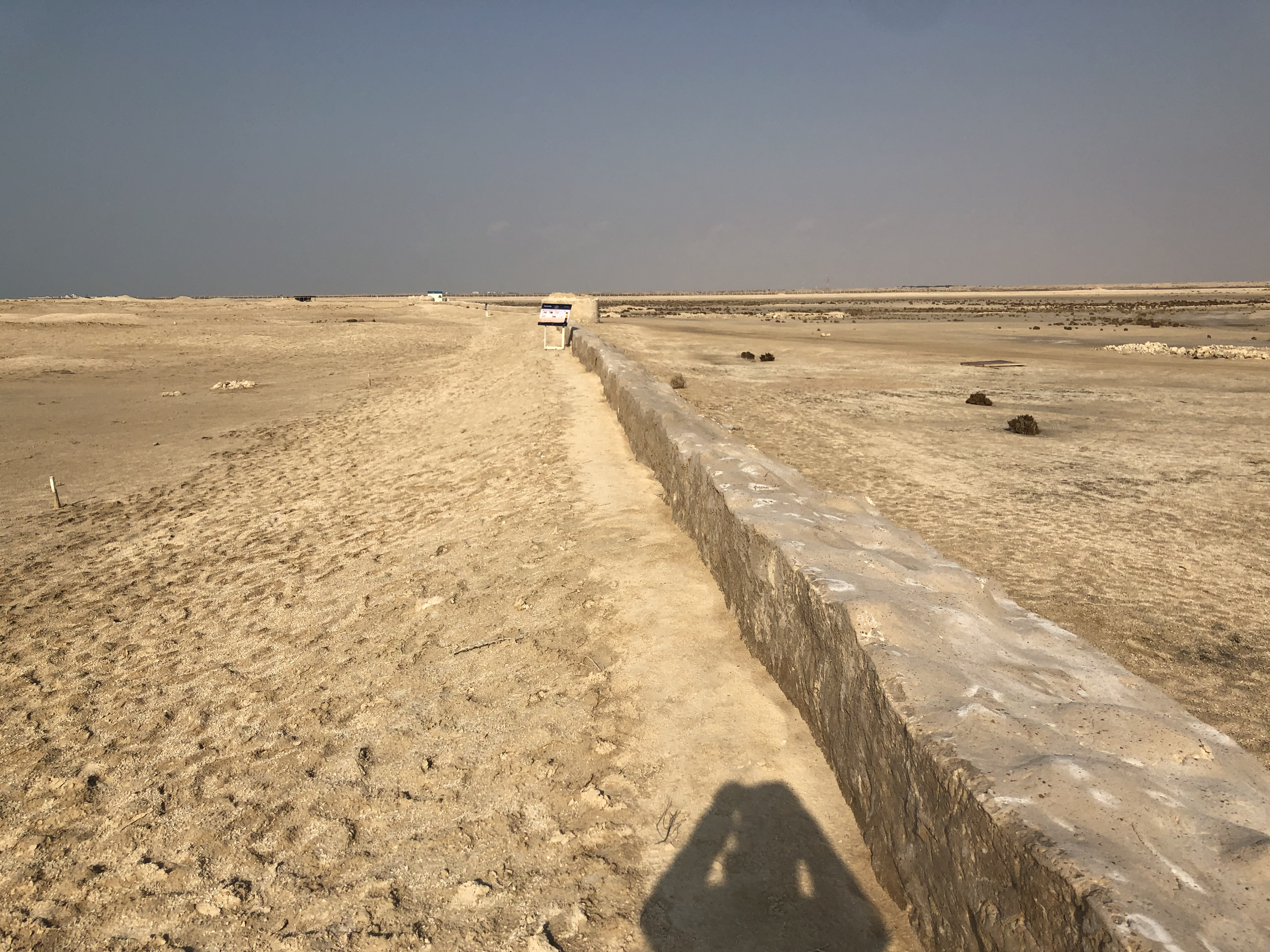
Remains of a boundary wall near the edge of the historic town.

As the influence of the Al Khalifa branch of the Bani Utbah expanded in Zubarah during the 1760s, tensions with the Al Musallam clan, then acting as local representatives of the Bani Khalid, began to escalate. The Al Musallam demanded tribute from the new arrivals, but Sheikh Muhammad bin Khalifa refused, prompting a series of skirmishes between the two factions. In response to the growing threat, Al Khalifa initiated the construction of a fortified settlement. Completed by 1768, the structure became known as Qal'at Murair, a coastal stronghold with defensive walls, watchtowers, and a canal linking it to the sea. Other defensive installations, including additional forts and towers built by earlier settlers, existed throughout the area.

To reinforce his political position, Sheikh Muhammad bin Khalifa also forged alliances through intermarriage with prominent tribal families, including the Al Bin Ali and Al Bu Kuwara. Following several successive skirmishes over their refusal to pay taxes, the Al Khalifa launched a successful assault on Al Huwaila, leading to the flight of the Al Musallam leadership to Najd.

Following the expulsion of the Bani Khalid, who ruled over much of northern Qatar, the Bani Utbah focused on developing Zubarah into a major port town. With a naturally sheltered harbor and newly reinforced defenses, it soon emerged as one of the principal emporiums and pearl trading centres of the Persian Gulf. The town attracted merchants from across the region, developing extensive trade links with India, Oman, Iraq, and Kuwait. Exports such as dates and pearls passed through its harbor alongside imports of spices and metals.

The abolition of trade taxes under the Utub further stimulated commercial activity, drawing traders from other Gulf ports. The town's prosperity further increased after the Ottoman–Persian War (1775–1776) and the subsequent Persian occupation of Basra. The disruption of commerce in southern Iraq prompted many Basran merchants and refugees to relocate to Zubarah, contributing to its rapid expansion.

Among these new arrivals was the affluent merchant Muhammad ibn Husayn ibn Rizq al-Ruzayqi and his son Ahmad, who played a major role in Zubarah's development. With the support of Khalifa bin Muhammad, who succeeded his father in 1777, the elder bin Rizq constructed a large residential complex that doubled as a commercial hub. At Ahmad's request, the scholar and jurist Uthman ibn Sanad al-Basri was invited to the town to serve as the supreme judge. In his biography, first published in 1813, ibn Sanad documented the administration and personages of Zubarah during this period, noting the arrival of other prominent figures such as the theologian Abd al-Djalil al-Tabatabai.

Also during the 1770s, merchants and residents from across Bahrain, Kuwait, Oman, and Qatar relocated to Zubarah in response to instability in the Gulf, including recurring attacks and outbreaks of plague. The ongoing conflict between the Bani Khalid and the rising Wahhabi movement also contributed to Zubarah's emergence as a safe and prosperous alternative. Among those born during this period of expansion was Thani bin Mohammed, founder of the House of Thani, who would later become an influential pearl trader. His commercial success earned his tribe, the Al-Maadeed, increased political influence in the town.

=== 1783 Bani Utbah invasion of Bahrain ===
Tensions between Zubarah and Persian-ruled Bahrain escalated in 1782 following an incident on the island of Sitra. A servant of the Al Khalifa family named Salem had been dispatched to purchase palm trunk, ropes, and other materials. While there, he and his companions were attacked by local Shi‘a residents; Salem was killed, several others were wounded, and their belongings were looted. Survivors returned to Zubarah, prompting outrage among its leaders. Sheikh Ahmad bin Muhammad Al Khalifa, angered by the killing of his retainer, sent a formal protest to Nasr Al-Madhkur, the Persian-appointed ruler of Bahrain and Bushehr. When Nasr failed to respond seriously, the Al Khalifa used the incident as justification for retaliation.

With the support of fellow Utub tribes, they launched an assault on Bahrain on 9 September 1782, plundering and destroying the town of Manama. A brief land battle ensued between the Arab tribes and Persian defenders, in which both sides suffered casualties. The people of Zubarah returned to the mainland after three days with a seized Persian gallivat that had been used to collect the annual treaty. On 1 October, the Persian governor of Shiraz, Ali Murad Khan, ordered Nasr Al-Madhkur to launch a full-scale counterattack against Zubarah and sent him reinforcements from the Persian mainland. Approximately 2,000 Persian troops were dispatched, and by December 1782, they began preparations for a landing on the Qatari coast.

In May 1783, Nasr's fleet arrived off the coast of Qatar and began disembarking at Ras Ushayriq near Zubarah. Due to low tide, the ships were forced to anchor offshore while the army advanced overland. Zubarah was besieged for nearly a month. Mediation efforts by Rashid bin Matar, the former ruler of Julfar (present-day Ras Al Khaimah), led to negotiations in which the Utub offered to return goods and ships previously seized from Persian ports such as Bandar Rig and from Bahrain. However, Nasr Al-Madhkur rejected the proposal and pressed ahead with his campaign.

On a Friday in December 1783, Persian forces landed between Zubarah and Freiha and launched a final assault. They were repelled in a decisive battle by a coalition of local Qatari tribes, which included the Al Maadeed of Freiha. Sheikh Muhammad bin Khalifa, the nephew of Nasr Al-Madhkur, was killed in combat along with many of his soldiers. The Persian army was routed, and its remnants fled the battlefield.

Following the defeat of Nasr Al-Madhkur's forces, his sword was seized by the Al Ibn Salama branch of the Al Bin Ali tribe, who had assisted the Al Khalifa in the defense of Zubarah. The sword later came into the possession of Sheikh Sultan bin Salama, remaining with his descendants until 1915, when it was formally presented as a gift to the ruler of Qatar at the time, Sheikh Abdullah bin Jassim Al Thani.

After the invasion, Sheikh Ahmed bin Muhammad bin Khalifa assumed control of the island, expelling the Persians and installing a governor on his behalf. His primary residence, however, remained in Zubarah, while a garrison was established in Qal'at Ad-Diwan, located south of present-day Manama.

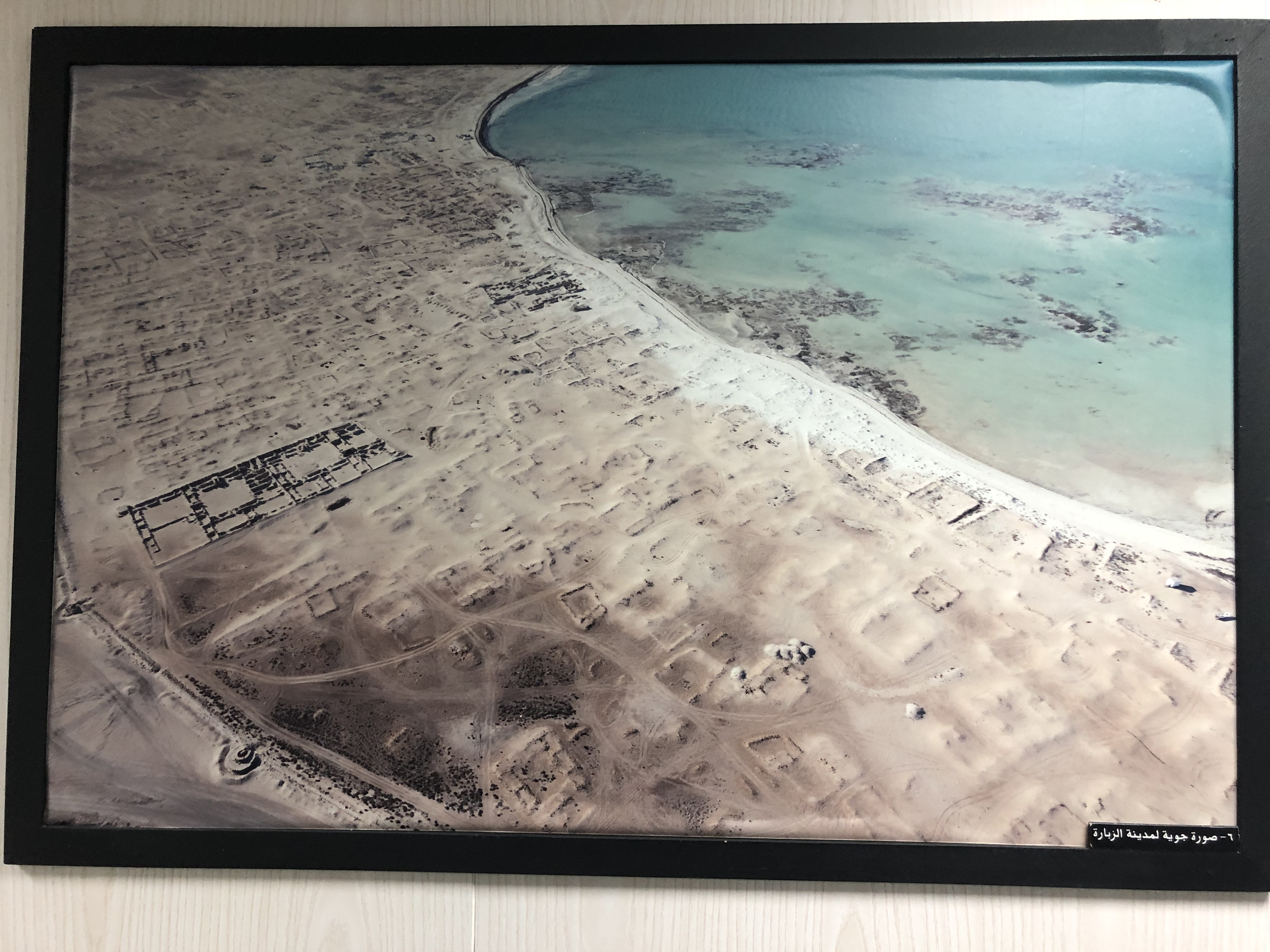
An aerial view of the ruined site of Zubarah.

Despite the instability surrounding Zubarah after the siege of Zubarah and the conquest of Bahrain in 1783, it flourished as a trading centre and its port grew larger than that of Qatif's by 1790. Al Zubarah developed into a center of Islamic education during this century. The first almanac produced in Qatar, and one of the earliest preserved local literary works in the nation, was produced here in 1790 – the Zubarah Almanac, authored by the Maliki Sunni scholar ‘Abd al Rahman al-Zawāwī. This calendar outlined the months and days of the year, specified prayer times, and included observations on agriculture and seasonal variations.

The town came under threat from 1780 onward due to the intermittent raids launched by the Wahhabis on the Bani Khalid strongholds in nearby Al Ahsa. The Wahhabis speculated that the population of Zubarah would conspire against the regime in Al Ahsa with the help of the Bani Khalid. They also believed that its residents practiced teachings contrary to the Wahhabi doctrine and regarded the town as an important gateway to the Persian Gulf. Saudi general Sulaiman ibn Ufaysan led a raid against the town in 1787. In 1792, a massive Wahhabi force conquered Al Ahsa, forcing many refugees to flee to Zubarah. Wahhabi forces besieged Zubarah and several neighboring settlements two years later to punish them for accommodating asylum seekers. The local chieftains were allowed to continue carrying out administrative tasks but were required to pay a tax.

=== Communal life ===
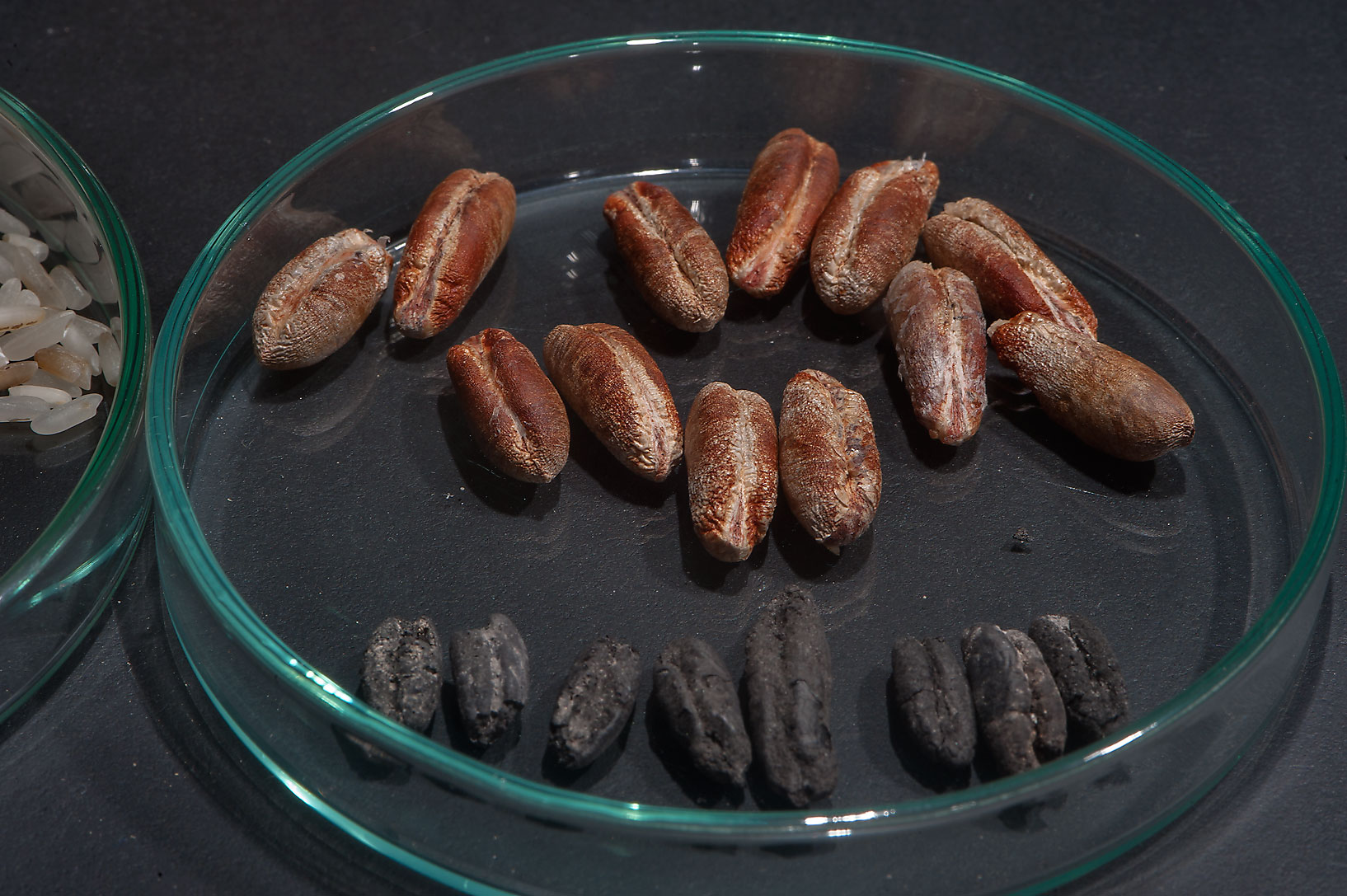
Dried dates recovered from the site.

Zubarah was at that time a well-organised town, with many of the streets running at right angles to one another and some neighbourhoods built according to a strict grid pattern. This layout suggests that the town was laid out and built as part of a major event, although seemingly constructed in closely dated stages. An estimate of the population at the height of the town has been calculated to a maximum number of between 6,000 and 9,000 people.

Most of the settler's dietary requirements were fulfilled by consuming livestock animals. Remnants of sheep, goat, birds, fish, and gazelle were among the waste collected from the palatial compounds. The wealthiest members of the community consumed mainly livestock, whereas the poorer residents relied on fish as their primary source of protein. Social, economic, and political activity was most likely centered in the souq. The discovery of numerous ceramic tobacco pipe bowls indicates a reluctant acceptance and growing social addiction to smoking tobacco. Coffee pots, mainly of Chinese origin, were used by Zubarah's inhabitants to drink Arabic coffee.

=== Later developments and decline (19th century) ===
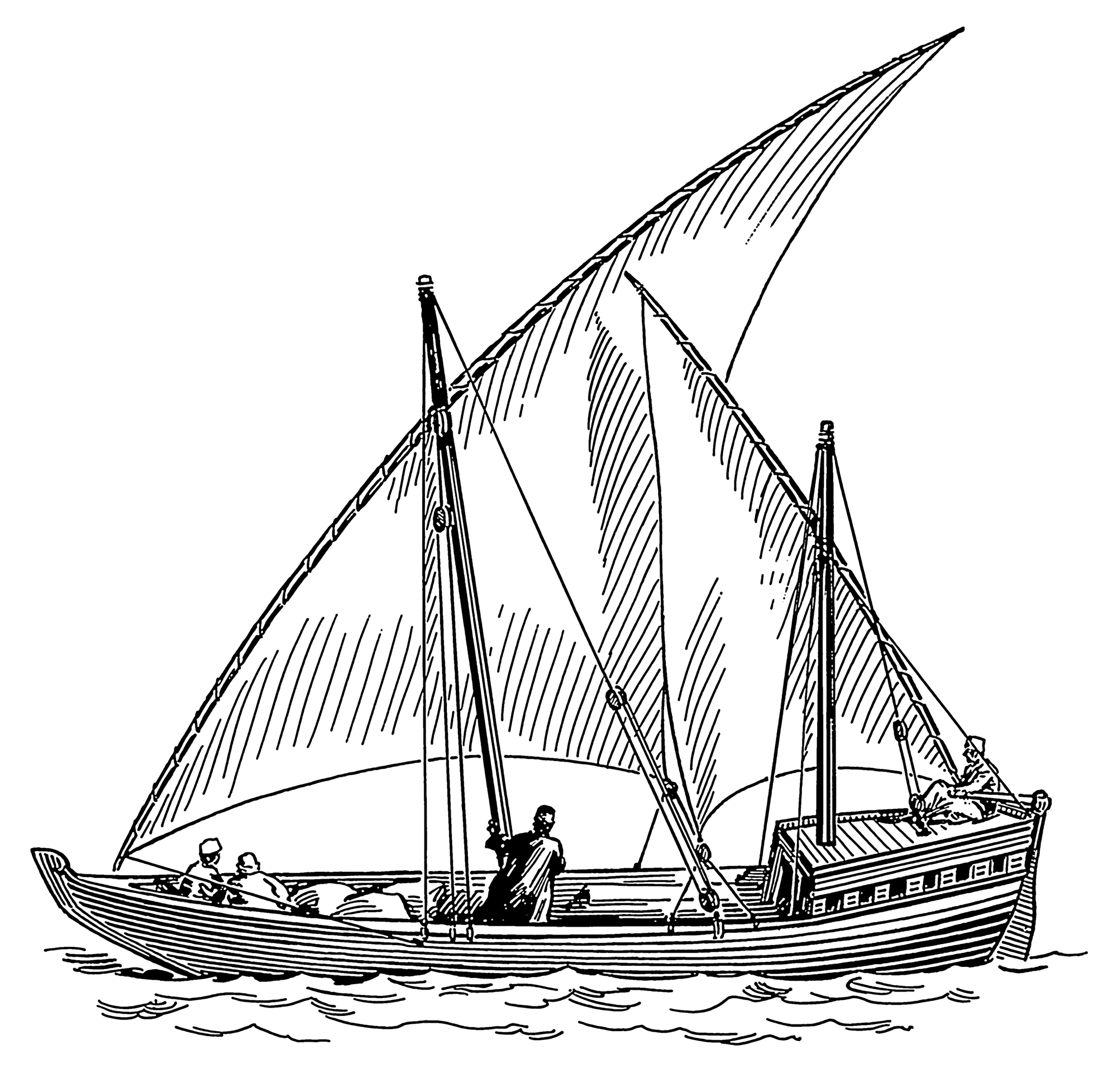
Line drawing of a dhow.

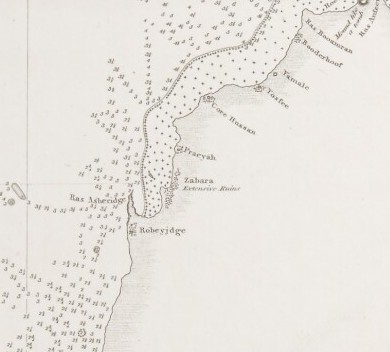
An 1824 map denoting "extensive ruins" in Zubarah.

The town was occupied by the Wahhabis in 1809. After the Wahhabi amir was made aware of advancements by hostile Egyptian troops on the western frontier in 1811, he reduced his garrisons in Bahrain and Zubarah to re-position his troops. Said bin Sultan of Muscat capitalized on this opportunity and attacked the Wahhabi garrisons in the eastern peninsula. The Wahhabi fortification in Zubarah was set ablaze and the Al Khalifa was effectively returned to power. Following the attack, the town was abandoned for a short period. However, later archaeological discoveries indicate that the town may have been partially abandoned shortly before the 1811 attack.

From around 1810, the British Empire became more influential in the Persian Gulf area, stationing political agents in various ports and cities to protect their trading routes. In one of the first descriptions of the salient towns in Qatar, Major Colebrook described Zubarah as such in 1820:

"protected by a tower and occupied at present merely for the security of fishermen that frequent it. It has a Khor (creek) with three fathoms water which Buggalahs may enter."

Captain George Barnes Brucks gave his account of Zubarah four years later. He stated:

"(it was) a large town, now in ruins. It is situated in a bay, and has been, before it was destroyed, a place of considerable trade."

Zubarah was eventually resettled in the late 1820s. It remained a pearl fishing community but on a significantly smaller scale than previously. The reconstructed town barely covered 20% of its predecessor. A new town wall was constructed much closer to the shore than the earlier town wall. This phase of Zubarah was not as organized in the layout of the streets and its buildings. Houses were still built in the traditional courtyard form, but on a smaller scale and more irregular in their shape. Additionally, evidence of decorated plaster known from earlier buildings was not found in the newly constructed buildings.

In 1868, the Al Khalifa launched a major naval attack on the eastern portion of Qatar. In the aftermath of this attack, a sovereignty treaty was signed between the Al Thani and the British, uniting the entire Qatari Peninsula under the leadership of the Al Thani. Nearly all of the authority that the Al Khalifa held in Zubarah was diminished, except for informal treaties they had signed with a few local tribes.

==== Al Khalifa contention ====
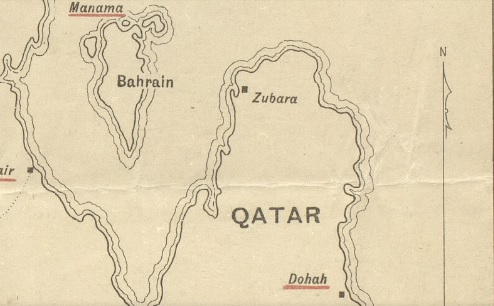
A map produced in 1920 to illustrate the dispute over the sovereignty of Zubarah.

On 16 August 1873, assistant political resident Charles Grant falsely reported that the Ottomans had sent a contingent of 100 troops under the command of Hossein Effendi from Qatif to Zubarah. This report angered the Emir of Bahrain, as he had previously signed a treaty with the Naim tribe residing in Zubarah in which they agreed to be his subjects, and the report implied that the Ottomans were encroaching on his territory. When questioned by the Emir, Grant referred him to political resident Edward Ross. Ross informed the Emir that he believed he had no right to protect tribes residing in Qatar. In September, the Emir reiterated his sovereignty over the town and the Naim tribe. Grant argued that there was no special mention of the Naim or Zubarah in any British treaties signed with Bahrain. A government official agreed with his views and concurred "that it was desirable that the Chief of Bahrain should, as far as practicable abstain from interfering in complications on the mainland."

The Al Khalifa witnessed another opportunity to renew their claim on the town in 1874 after a Bahraini opposition leader named Nasir bin Mubarak moved to Qatar. They believed that Mubarak, with the assistance of Jassim bin Mohammed Al Thani, would attack the Naim living in Zubarah as a prelude to an invasion of Bahrain. As a result, a body of Bahraini reinforcements were sent to Zubarah, much to the disapproval of the British who suggested that the Emir was involving himself in complications. Edward Ross made it apparent that a government council decision advised the Emir that he should not interfere in the affairs of Qatar. However, the Al Khalifa remained in frequent contact with the Naim, drafting 100 tribe members in their army and offering them financial assistance.

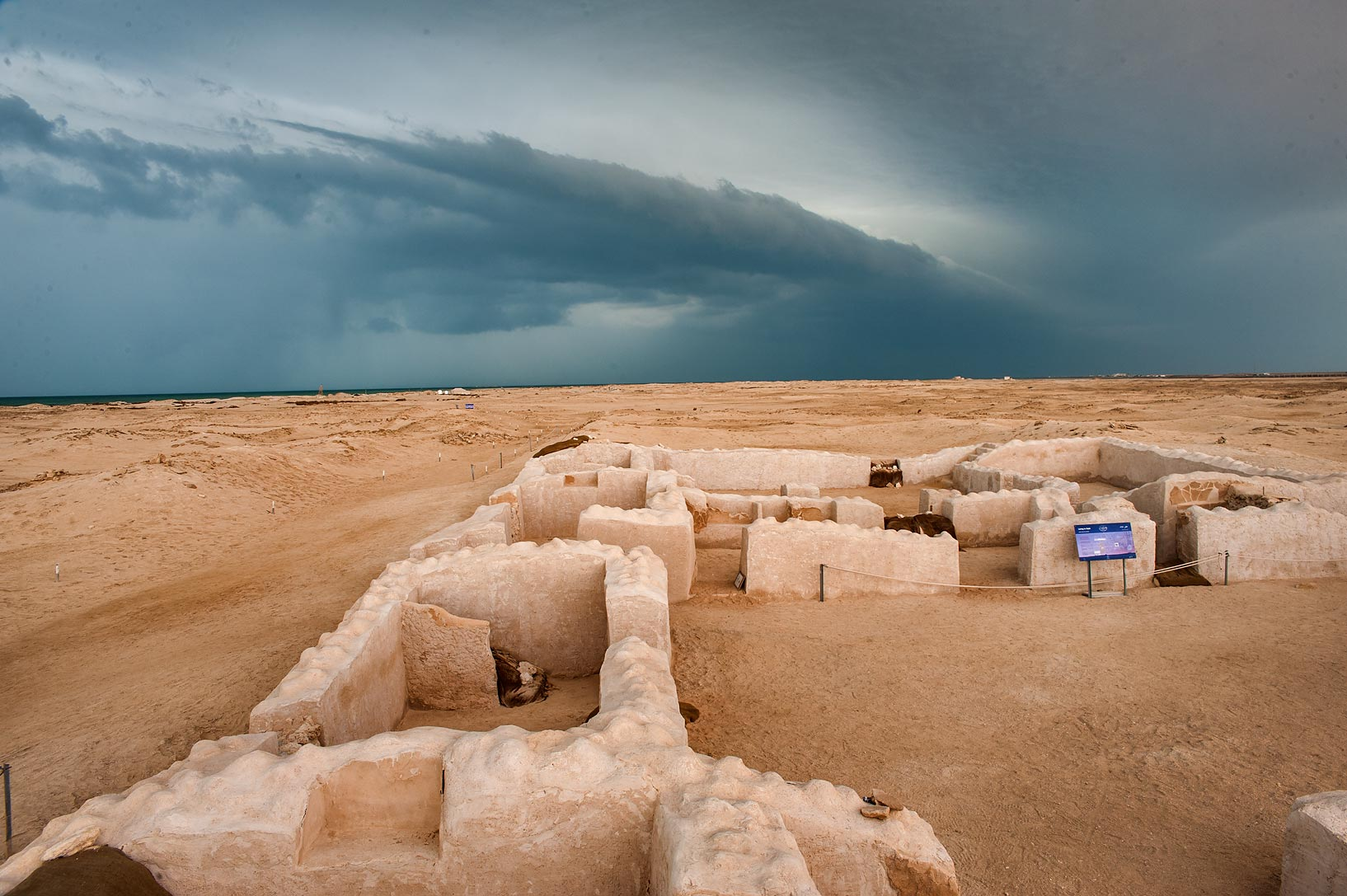
Ruins in Zubarah on a cloudy day.

In September 1878, several Zubarans were involved in an act of piracy on a passing boat which resulted in the deaths of four people. Political resident Edward Ross demanded that the Ottoman authorities punish the townspeople for the crime, and extended an offer of British naval assistance. He met with wāli Abdullah Pasha in Basra to finalize the deal. Shortly after the British–Ottoman meeting, Jassim bin Mohammed Al Thani and Nasir bin Mubarak attacked Zubarah with a force of 2,000 armed men. By 22 October, Jassim bin Mohammed's army, having sacked the town, surrounded Murair Fort, which was fortified by 500 members of the Naim tribe. The Naim eventually surrendered to Jassim bin Mohammed's forces on unfavorable terms and most of the Zubarah's residents were relocated to Doha. The incident aggravated the ruler of Bahrain due to his treaty with the Naim tribe. There were reports in 1888 that Jassim intended to restore the city so that it could serve as a base for his son-in-law to attack Bahrain, but he renounced his plans after being warned by the British.

==== Re-settlement of Al Bin Ali in 1895 ====
At the request of Jassim bin Mohammed, several members of the Al Bin Ali, an Utub tribe, relocated from Bahrain to Zubarah in 1895 after renouncing their allegiance to the Bahraini emir. The Bahraini emir, fearful that Jassim bin Mohammed was preparing to launch an invasion, issued a warning to him and informed the political resident in Bahrain of the dispute. Upon being made aware of the proceedings, the British requested the Ottomans, who had been acting in concert with Jassim bin Mohammed, to abort the settlement. Much to the indignation of the Ottomans, the British sent a naval ship to Zubarah shortly after and seized seven of the Al Bin Ali's boats after the tribe's leader refused to comply with their directive. The Ottoman governor of Zubarah, under the belief that the British were infringing on Ottoman dominion, relayed the events to the Ottoman Porte, who began assembling a large army near Qatif. Jassim bin Mohammed also congregated a large number of boats near the coast. Subsequently, the governor of Zubarah declared Bahrain as Ottoman territory and threatened that the Porte would provide military support to Qatari tribes who were preparing to launch a naval invasion. This invoked a harsh reprisal from Britain, who, after issuing a written notice, opened fire on Zubarah's port, destroying 44 dhows. The incursion and subsequent Ottoman retreat prompted Jassim bin Mohammed and his army to surrender on unfavorable terms, in which he was instructed to hoist the Trucial flag at Zubarah. He was also ordered to pay 30,000 rupees.

=== Abandonment (20th and 21st century) ===
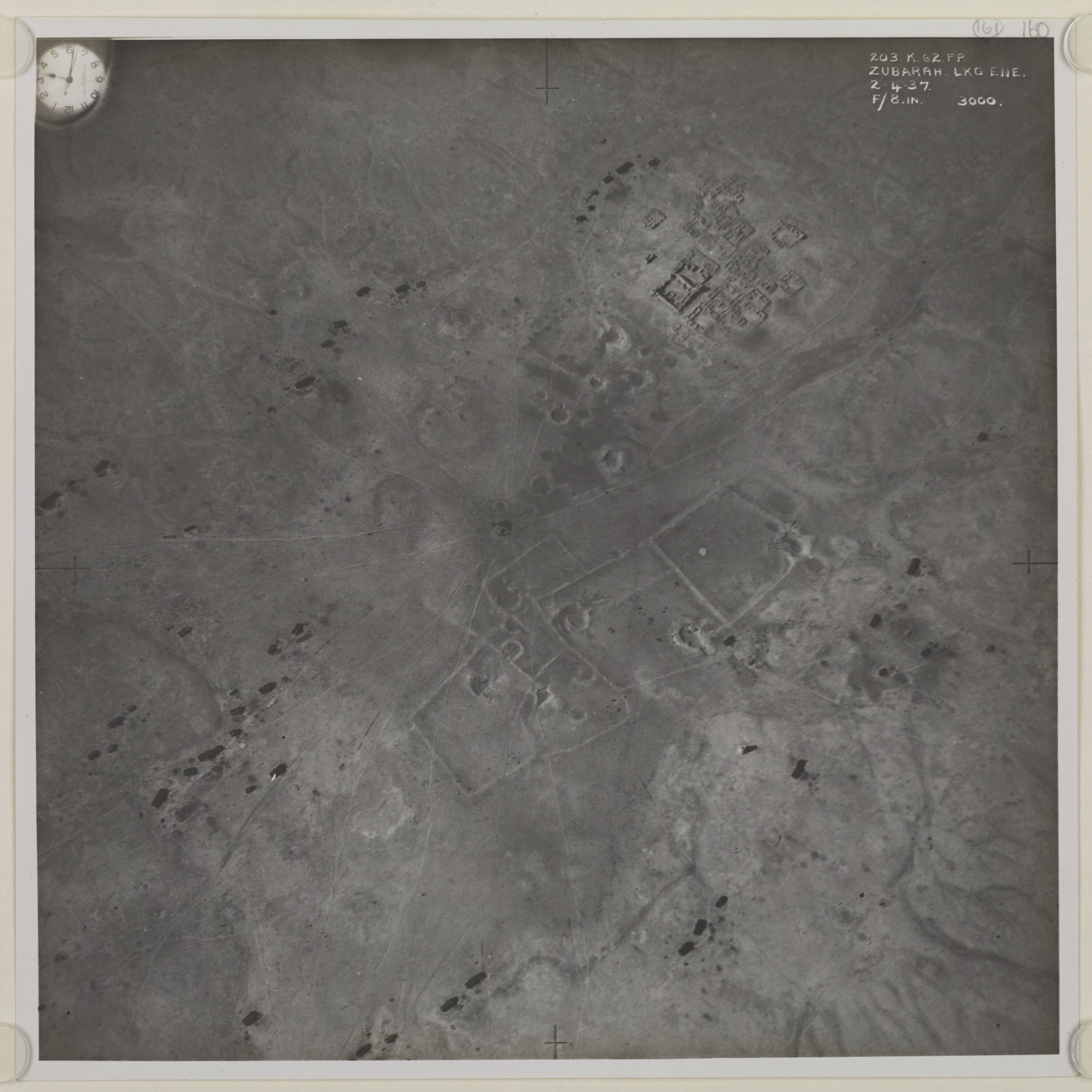
Aerial photograph of Zubarah in 1937.

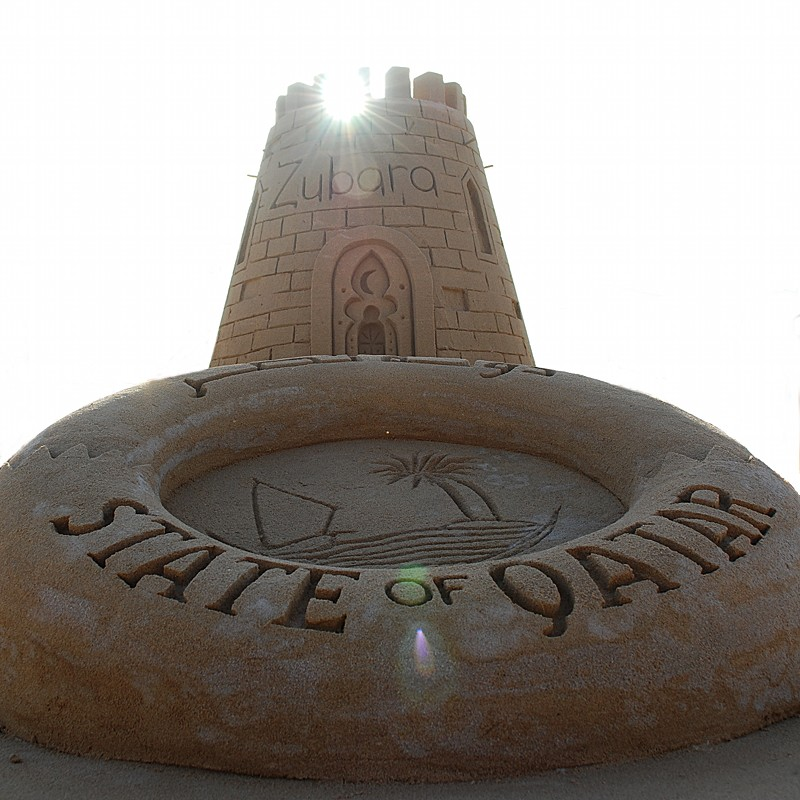
A welcome sign in Zubarah.

With its population already depleted, much of the remaining population migrated to other regions in Qatar in the early 20th century due to the inadequate water supply in the town.

J.G. Lorimer's Gazetteer of the Persian Gulf gives the following account of Zubarah in 1908:

"A ruined and deserted town on the west side of the Qatar Promontory, about 5 miles south of Khor Hassan. It stands at the foot of a deep bay of the same name, of which the western point is Ras 'Ashairiq and which contains a small island, also called Zubarah . The town was formerly the stronghold of the Al Khalifah ruling family of Bahrain : its site is still frequented by the Na'im of Bahrain and Qatar. The town was walled and some 10 or 12 forts stood within a radius of 7 miles round it, among them Faraihah, Halwan, Lisha, Ain Muhammad, Qal'at Murair, Rakaiyat, Umm-ash-Shuwail and Thaghab [...]. All of these are now ruinous and deserted, except Thaghab, which the people of Khor Hassan visit to draw water. Murair is said to have been connected with the sea by a creek which enabled sailing boats to discharge their cargoes at its gate, but the inlet is now silted up with sand."

In 1937, a conflict broke out between Qatari loyalists and the Naim tribe who had defected to Bahrain, precipitating Bahrain's subsequent territorial claims to Zubarah. A proposal for Zubarah to become an oil terminal was a contributing factor in the conflict. Qatar's emir, Abdullah bin Jassim, referred to the Bahraini claim on Zubarah as "imaginary" and "not based on logic". He also alleged that Bahrain assisted the Naim in the form of arms and finances. That year, in the aftermath of the conflict and subsequent out-migration, Abdullah bin Jassim began the construction of Al Zubara Fort to compensate for the reduced garrison. It was completed in 1938. Qal'at Murair, the hitherto principal fort of the town, was abandoned soon after Al Zubara Fort was erected.

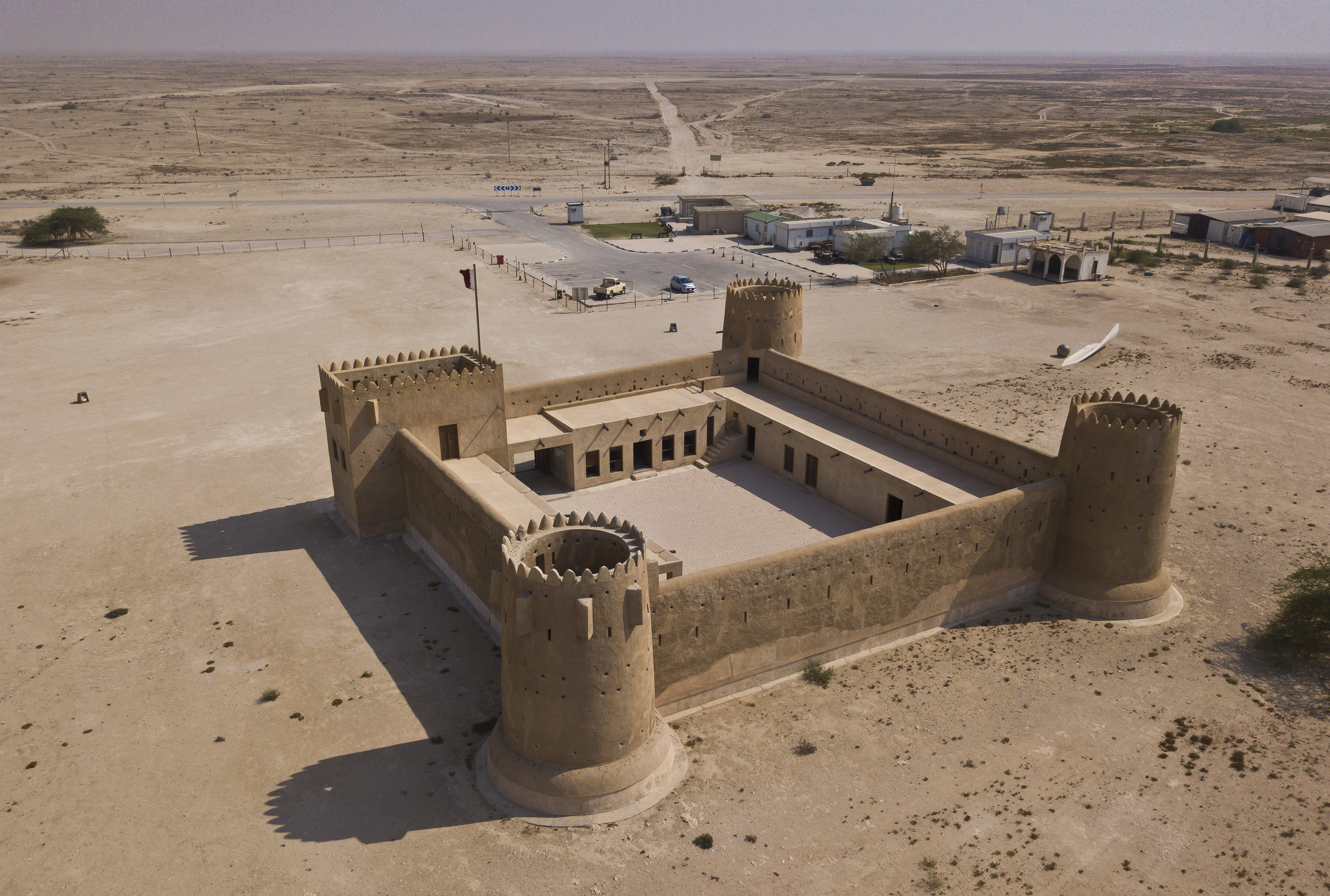
Aerial view of the fort and museum in 2017.

In the mid-20th century, the political adviser in Bahrain, Charles Belgrave, reported that just a few Bedouin of the Naim tribe lived, albeit nomadically, in the ruined town. The area was gradually abandoned towards the end of the 20th century and was used primarily for beach camps. The fort also housed a coast guard station until the 1980s.

== Geography ==
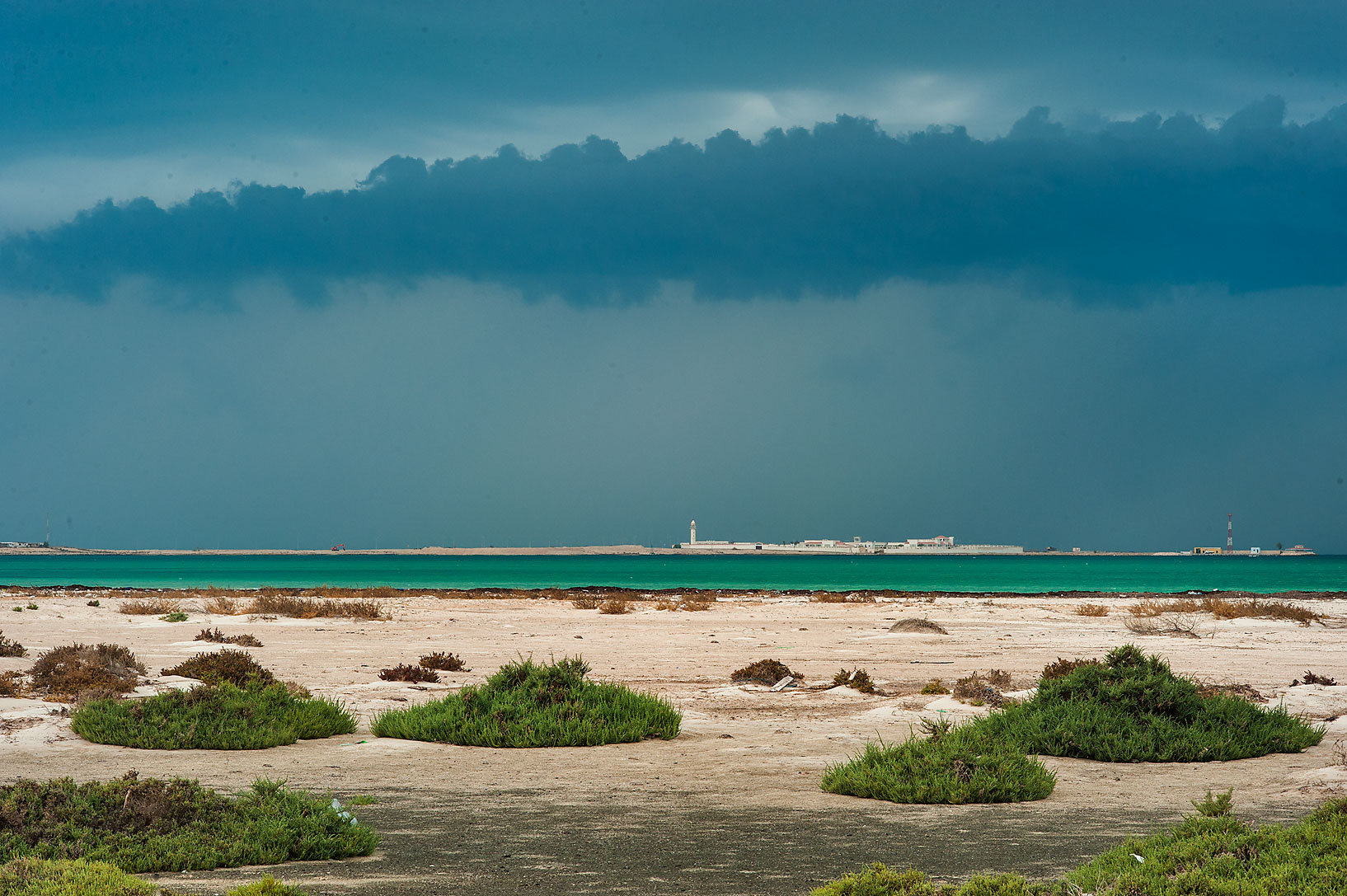
Zubarah Beach on a cloudy day.

Zubarah encompasses a 400-hectare stretch on the northwestern coast of the Qatar peninsula and is located approximately 105 km (65 mi) from the Qatari capital Doha. It is situated over a low, coastal hillock. The two main habitat types are the sabkha and the stony desert. The northern and south-eastern section of the site are bounded by sabkhas. Historically, fresh water was scarcely available. In an attempt to amass a water supply, Murair Fort was constructed 1.8 km (1.1 mi) eastward of the original settlement, on the margins of the desert scarp. The fort served to facilitate wells that tapped the shallow freshwater lenses.

Holocene deposits are densely scattered in the sabkha and mud plain areas located near the city ruins and the sea. Most of the buildings in Zubarah were constructed using materials from these deposits. An area encompassing the city ruins and the project, which is labeled a proto-sabkha habitat, also contains large quantities of Holocene fossils. Eocene limestone is predominant further inland where the habitat is a stony, arid desert.

Zubarah Beach is located near the archaeological site and is open only to those on guided tours.

=== Flora and fauna ===
Vegetation in Zubarah is sparse, although three of the most recurrent species of seagrasses in the Persian Gulf have been collected and recorded in the area. This includes Halophila ovalis, Halophila stipulacea and Halodule uninervis.

Around 48 fish species, 40 mollusc species, 17 reptile species, and 170 arthropod species were recorded in the expanse of the town. A preliminary investigation of Zubarah uncovered four previously unknown species of tardigrades. Eleven species of Heterotardigrada, a class of the tardigrade, have been found to occur in the area. Spiny-tailed lizards are the most prominent reptile species in the area. They are commonly spotted on vegetation. Mesalina brevirostris, a species of short-nosed lizard, is another reptile species that is densely scattered throughout the area.

== Economy and trade ==
=== Pearling activities ===
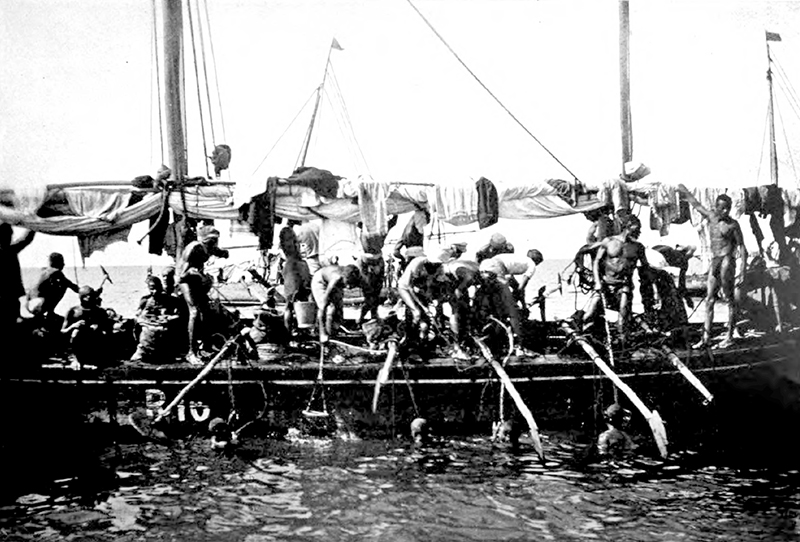
Pearl diving in the Persian Gulf.

Zubarah was primarily an emporium and pearling settlement that capitalized on its proximity to pearl beds, possession of a large harbour, and its central position on the Gulf routes. Its economy depended on the pearl diving season, which took place during the long summer months. Pearling drew Bedouin from the interior of Qatar as well as people from all over the Persian Gulf to dive, trade, and safeguard the town from attack while the town's men were at sea.

Boats from Zubarah would sail out to the pearl beds found along the southern shore of the Persian Gulf, from Bahrain to the United Arab Emirates. The trips lasted several weeks at a time. Men worked in pairs to harvest mollusks potentially hiding pearls inside them. One man would dive for about a minute and the other remained on the ship to pull the diver back to safety with his harvest.

The archaeological evidence for pearling on site comes primarily from the tools used by the divers such, as pearl boxes, diving weights, and small measuring weights used during trading.

=== Global trade ===
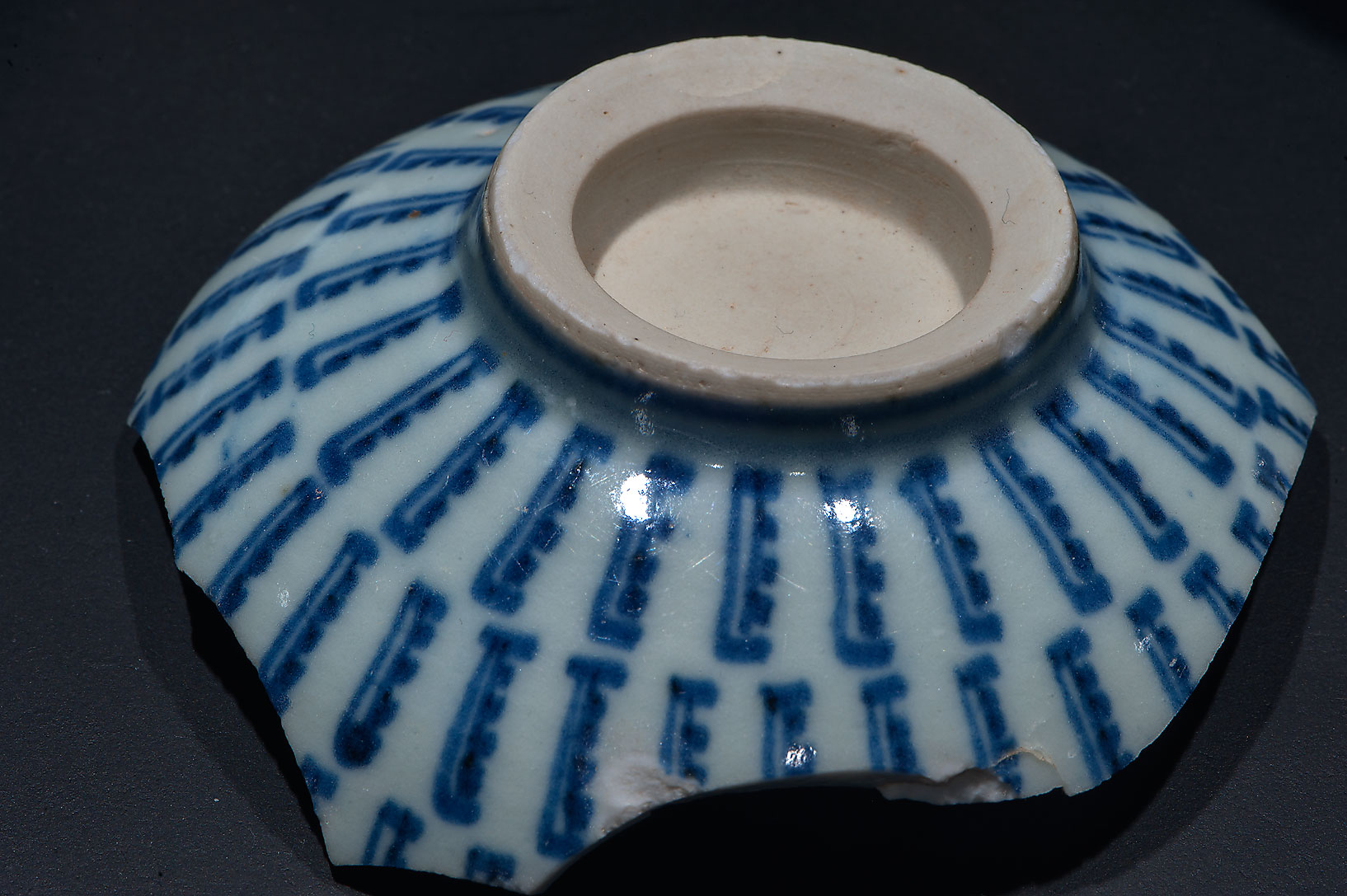
Piece of broken porcelain on display at the Zubarah Museum.

Zubarah was the focal point of an extensive regional trade network during its peak in the late eighteenth century. Until the introduction of the cultured pearl in the early 1900s, the trade in pearls constituted the Persian Gulf's most important industry, employing up to a third of the male population in the region. Zubarah, being one of the focal pearling and trading towns, contributed to the geopolitical, social, and cultural trajectories of Gulf history which shape the region today.

Ceramics, coins, and the remains of foodstuffs from the excavations attest to Zubarah's far-reaching trade and economic links in the late 18th century, with material deriving from eastern Asia, Persia, the Ottoman Empire, Africa, Europe, and the Persian Gulf. Diving weights and other material cultures show how closely the connection between the daily life in the town and the pearl fishing and trading were. The discovery of coffee cups and tobacco pipes in the excavations reveals the growing importance of these commodities all over the Persian Gulf during the eighteenth and nineteenth centuries. The etching of a merchant's dhow –a traditional wooden boat of Arabia– found incised into the plaster in a room of a courtyard building, details how intimately the town's inhabitants associated their daily lives with long-distance maritime trade and commerce. Date trade also had an important role in the local economy.

=== Marketplace ===
A complex array of small storage rooms have been identified as part of the souq (market) of Zubarah. The wide variety of trade objects that have been found in the rooms points towards the area's classification as a place of trade. The souq would have been the centre of the town and of its economy. Various commodities, including ironsmithing, were sold at this souq.

== Historical architecture ==
=== Infrastructure ===
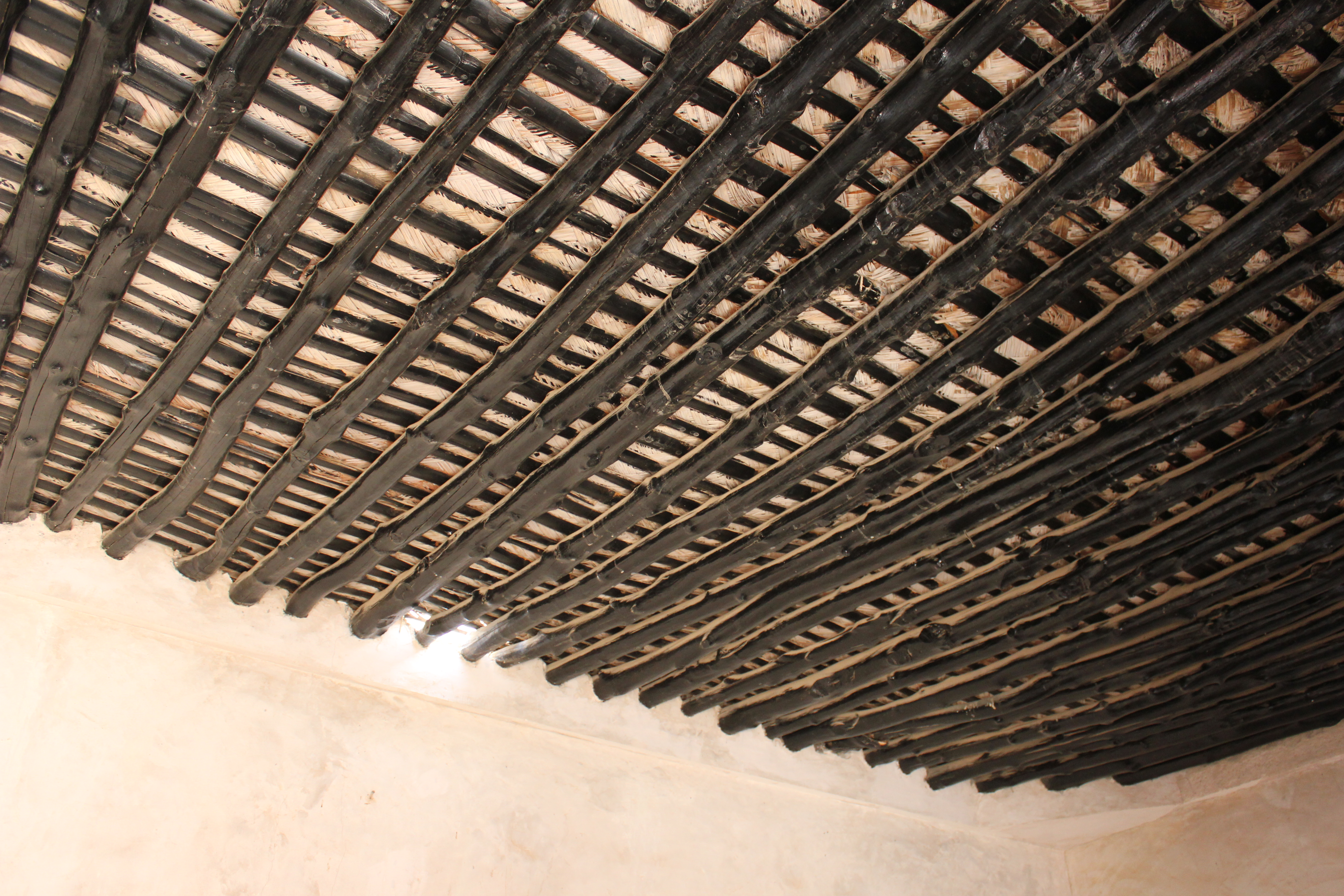
Ceiling in a building in Zubarah made from the leaves and trunks of palm trees.

The architecture consisted mainly of courtyard houses, a traditional form of Arabic architecture found throughout the Middle East. A series of small rooms were organized around a large central courtyard, where the majority of daily activity took place. Typically, a portico opened out onto the courtyard on the south side, which offered shelter from the sun. The houses of Zubarah were constructed from soft local stone, or from limestone quarried from the northern settlement of Freiha. The stone was then protected by a thick gypsum plaster coating. Features such as doorways and niches were decorated with geometric stucco designs. Housing units were accessible by a doorway and a bent corridor, in order to avert unauthorized viewing into the household, and to prevent sand from blowing into the house. Traces of what seem to be tent placements and/or palm-leaf and palm-matt huts found near the beach may be associated with transient members of the Zubaran society. These interim dwellings likely housed the people who were the primary producers of Zubarah's wealth: the pearl fishers and mariners who harvested the pearl banks each season.

The most impressive and colossal of the building complexes measures 110 by 110 m (360 by 360 ft) in size and is commonly referred to as 'the palace'. This structure follows the same form as the domestic architecture seen elsewhere in Zubarah, but on a much larger scale. Nine interconnected compounds, each comprising a courtyard surrounded by a range of rooms, made up the interior of this structure. Plaster stucco decoration was used to embellish internal entrances and rooms. The discovery of internal staircases indicates that the compounds were multi-storeyed. The nine compounds of the complex were enclosed by a high circuit wall with circular towers at the four corners, each of which was capable of supporting a small cannon. The size and visual dominance of the palatial compound suggest that it was occupied by a family of wealthy and powerful sheikhs who were community leaders in the social and economic life of the town.

=== Fortifications ===
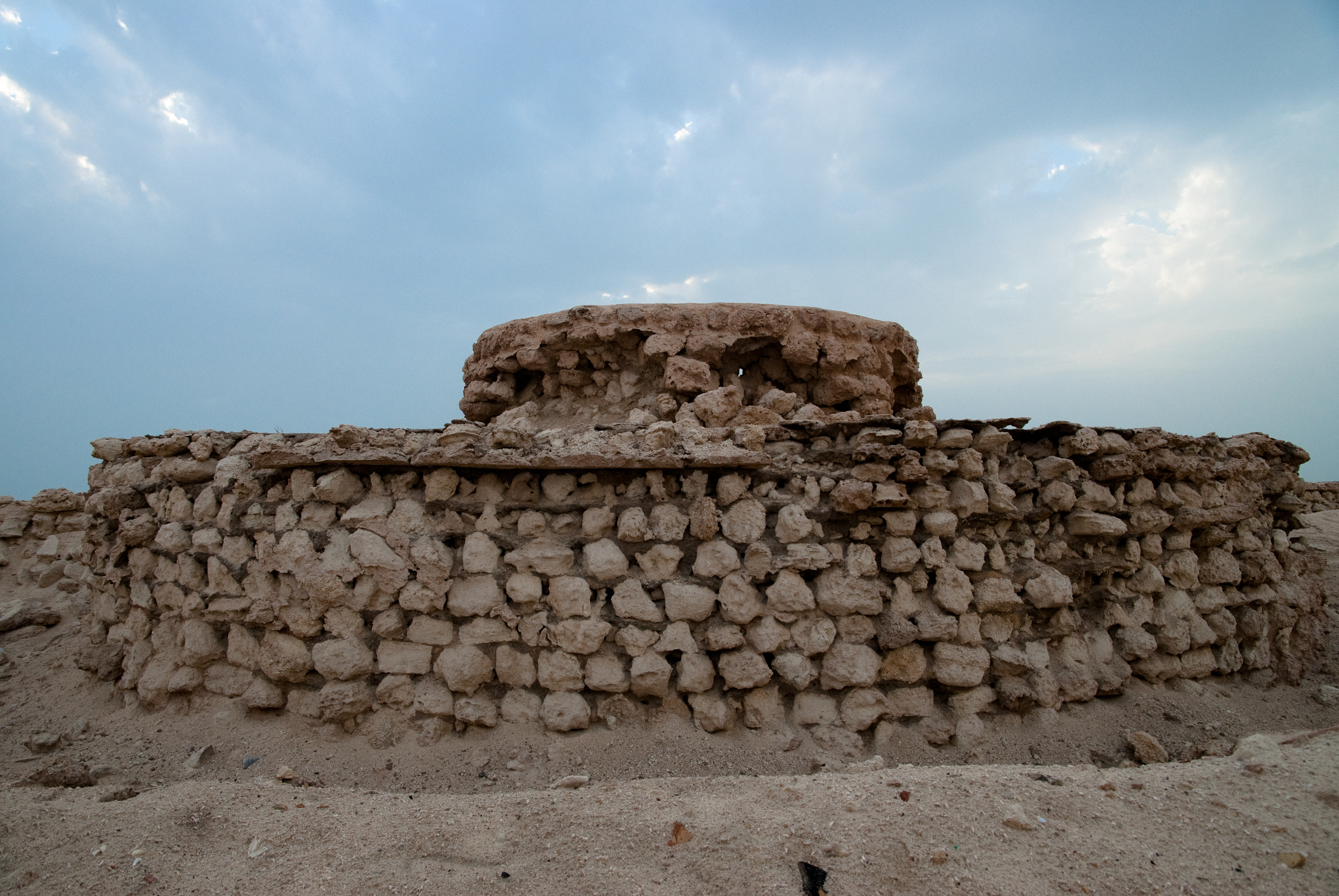
Reconstructed tower in Zubarah.

The protection of the town and its people's wealth was a clear priority. A large wall was built in the late-18th-century town and its bay in a 2.5 km (1.6 mi) arc from shore to shore. The wall was defended by 22 semi-circular towers placed at regular intervals. It was faced by a parapet with a walkway, most likely to provide leverage for gunners. Access to the town was limited to a few defended gateways from the landside, or via its harbour. There was no sea wall, but a stout fort defended the main landing area on the sandy beach.

Despite its defensive fortifications, Zubarah was attacked on several occasions. In addition to two major attacks carried out at the behest of Nasr Al-Madhkur in 1778, and 1782, the residents of the town were engaged in a war with the Banu Kaab of Khuzestan during the late eighteenth century.

=== Industry ===
A large number of date-presses (madbassat) are found in houses throughout the town. They are small rooms with ridged plastered floors sloping to one corner where a jar would have been placed. Dates were packed in sacks and placed on the floor with weights on top to squeeze out the date juice – a sweet sticky syrup (dibs). The jar would collect and preserve the syrup for later consumption or use in cooking. In 2014, a site was excavated which revealed the largest yet-discovered date-pressing site in the country and region. There were 27 date presses found overall, including 11 found in one lone complex.

== Attractions ==
=== Al Zubara Fort ===
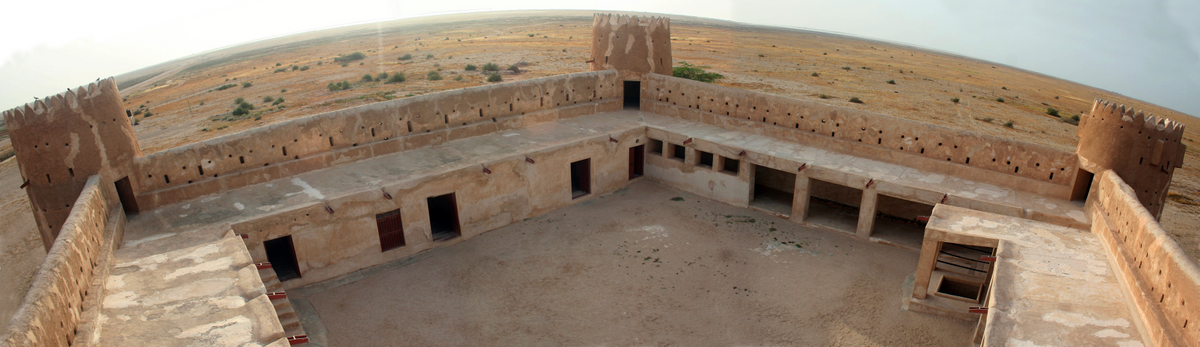
An inside view of Al Zubara Fort.

Zubarah is well known for the fortress of 1938, which was officially named after the town. The Al Zubara Fort follows a traditional concept with a square ground plan with sloping walls and corner towers. Three of the towers are round while the fourth, the southeast tower, is rectangular; each is topped with curved-pointed crenellations, with the fourth as the most machicolated tower. The fort's design recalls earlier features common in Arab and Gulf fortification architecture but varies by being constructed on concrete foundations. It marks the transition from solely stone-built structures to cement-based ones, albeit in a traditional design.

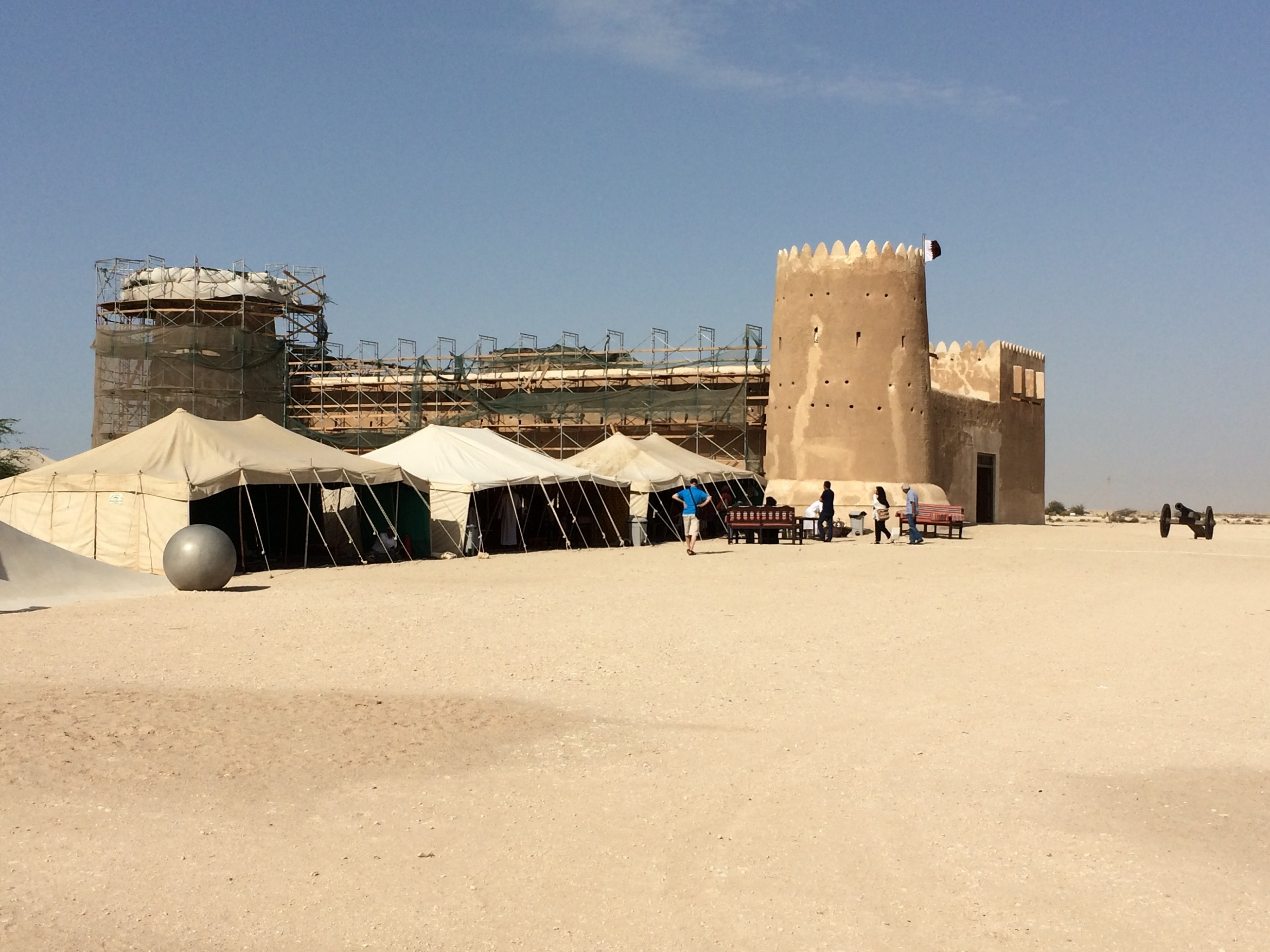
2015, outside view of renovations on Al Zubara Fort.

Originally, the fort was built as a base for the Qatari military and police to protect Qatar's northwest coast as part of a series of forts along Qatar's coastline. It was restored in 1987 with the removal of some much later auxiliary buildings erected to house the Qatari forces. After opening, the fort quickly became a major heritage attraction and, for a while, a local museum. Due to the unsuitable conditions in the fort for displaying and storing finds, the objects were relocated to Doha in 2010. Starting in 2011, the Qatar Museums Authority conducted a project of monitoring and restoration to ensure the upkeep of the fort. Between 2010 and 2013, parts of the fort were inaccessible to visitors.

=== Qal'at Murair ===
The Murair Fort (Qal'at Murair in Arabic), situated 1.65 km (1.03 mi) east of the town of Zubarah, was built shortly after the town's settlement. The fort served to espouse Zubarah and especially entrenched the town's primary freshwater source: groundwater reached by shallow wells. Within the fortification walls were a mosque, domestic buildings, and at least one large well. Around the fort, several enclosures attest to the presence of fields, plantations, or holding pens for animals, suggesting that this was also an agricultural settlement.

Shortly after the foundation of Zubarah, two screening walls were constructed from the outer town wall toward Qal'at Murair. These two walls, oriented east-west, include round towers placed at regular intervals, which strengthened their defensive capabilities. The screening walls likely served to secure the transportation of water from the wells inside Qal'at Murair to Zubarah. In the hot summers of the Persian Gulf, water was a valuable commodity. The walls also channeled general traffic to and from the town over open salt flats.

== Tourism ==
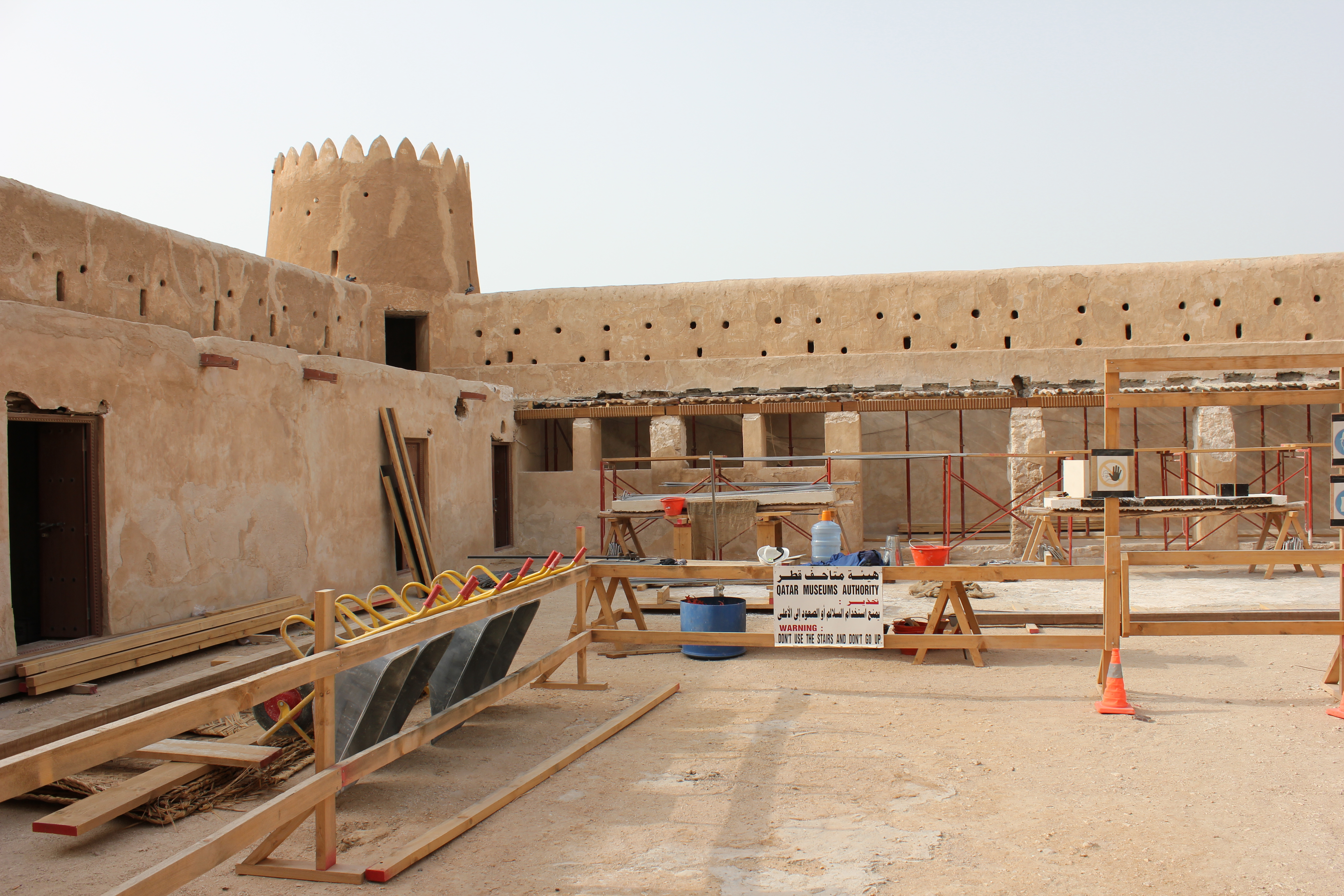
2012, renovations in Al Zubara Fort.

Zubarah was added to UNESCO's World Heritage tentative list in 2008. Since 2009, the site has been the subject of joint research by the Qatar Islamic Archaeology and Heritage Project (QIAH) and Copenhagen University, and development as a protected heritage site. For protection, most of the site is enclosed within a fenced area. Additionally, visitors must pass a guard to enter the heritage town.

Prior to its addition to the World Heritage List, there was no visitor centre in the town. Other visitor facilities were sparse. An information stand in a parking lot next to the Al Zubara Fort provided an overview and introduction to the site, fort, and town. There were restrooms located near the fort, but there were no refreshments available in the vicinity.

On June 22, 2013, UNESCO added the site to its World Heritage List. The UNESCO report stated that the town was distinguished by its degree of preservation and its evidenced sustainment by pearl diving and commerce. Following its inclusion in the list, the partially restored fort was transformed into a visitor centre and several rooms were designated for showcasing the subjects of pearling and astronomy.

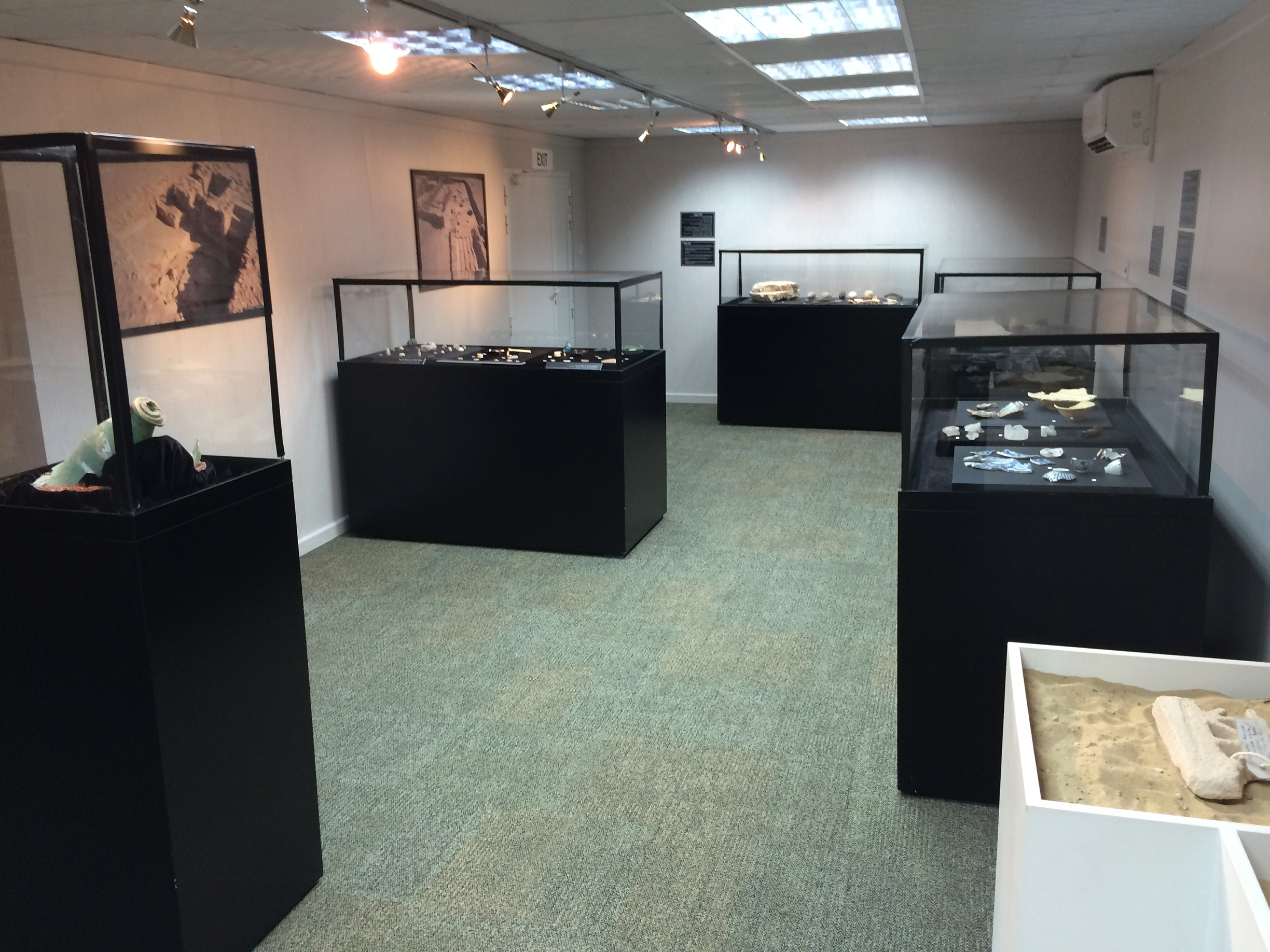
A museum in Al Zubara Fort showcasing artifacts from the town.

Guided tours of the town are offered, and field trips to the site are being integrated into various schools' history curriculum. There is also a self-guided tour, where the visitor is guided by signposts. Tourism increased rapidly after the town's renovations were completed in 2014, attracting more than 30,000 visitors in the first three months of the year. This was a 170% increase from the entire 2013 season.

== Sports ==
The town currently hosts the Tour of Al Zubarah, a men's one-day cycle race which was rated as 2.2 by the UCI and forms part of the UCI Asia Tour. It was selected as the host of the tournament to procure more media attention to the region, thereby amplifying tourism. In addition, Zubarah is one of the host cities of the ladies' and men's Tour of Qatar and has been described as one of the toughest and longest stages in the course.

A horse racing event known as Al Zubarah Cup is staged in the town. A horse breeding farm, which is planned to be one of the largest in the region, is currently being constructed in the town. The project is funded by the Qatar Racing and Equestrian Club.

== Education ==
Name of School	Curriculum	Grade	Genders	Official Website	Ref
Al Zubara Boys Schools	Independent	Primary – Secondary	Male-only	N/A	

== Developments ==
The planned Qatar–Bahrain Friendship Bridge, slated to be the longest fixed link in the world, will connect the northwest coast of Qatar near Zubarah with Bahrain, specifically, south of Manama. Its location several kilometres south of Zubarah is planned so as to have negligible impact on the heritage site. It was originally expected to be constructed by 2022, but has faced numerous delays. In February 2024, during a meeting of Qatari–Bahraini Follow-up Committee, both Qatari and Bahraini officials confirmed they were "taking necessary steps to implement the project".

An expansion of Zubarah Road –a one-lane road leading to the archaeological site– was announced in 2014 by the Public Works Authority. It is planned to introduce three additional lanes.

== Archaeology and conservation ==
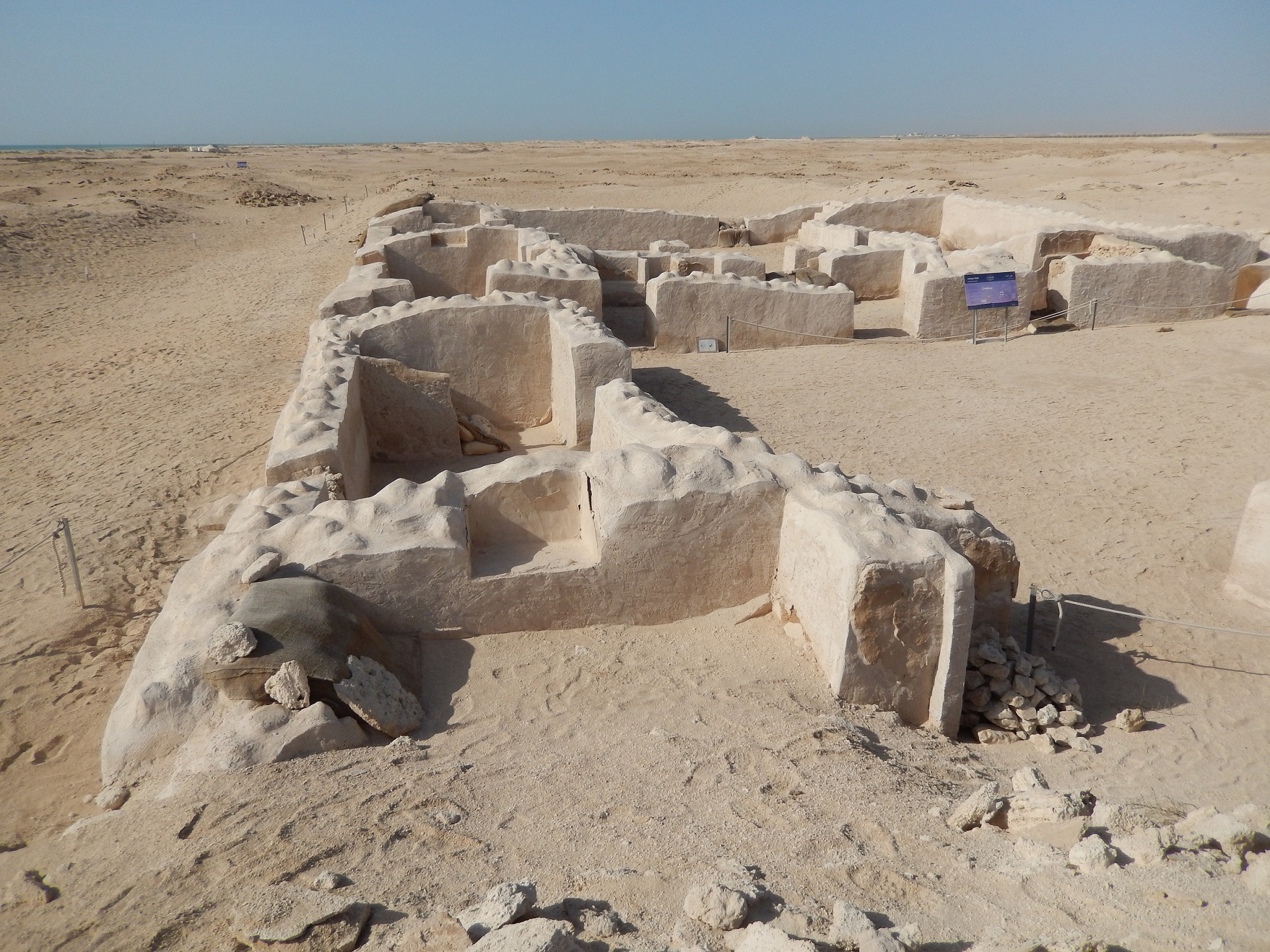
Partially reconstructed ruins in Zubarah.

In March 1956, the site of Zubarah was included in the first Danish expeditions of Qatar and a team of archaeologists from Aarhus University and Moesgård Museum provided preliminary reconnaissance of the area. In 1962, Moesgård Museum archaeologist Hans Jørgen Madsen returned to the ruins in Zubarah and conducted further surveys.

The Qatar Museums Authority (QMA) and its predecessor carried out two excavation projects in Zubarah, with the first during the early 1980s, and the latter from 2002 to 2003. The excavations in the 1980s were the more comprehensive of the two.

In 2009, the QMA jointly launched the Qatar Islamic Archaeology and Heritage Project (QIAH) with the University of Copenhagen. The QIAH is a ten-year research, conservation, and heritage initiative to investigate archaeological sites, preserve their fragile remains, and work towards the presentation of the sites to the public. The project is an initiative by the Qatar Museums Authority's chairperson H.E. Al-Mayassa bint Hamad bin Khalifa Al-Thani and vice-chairperson H.E. Hassan bin Mohamed bin Ali Al Thani.

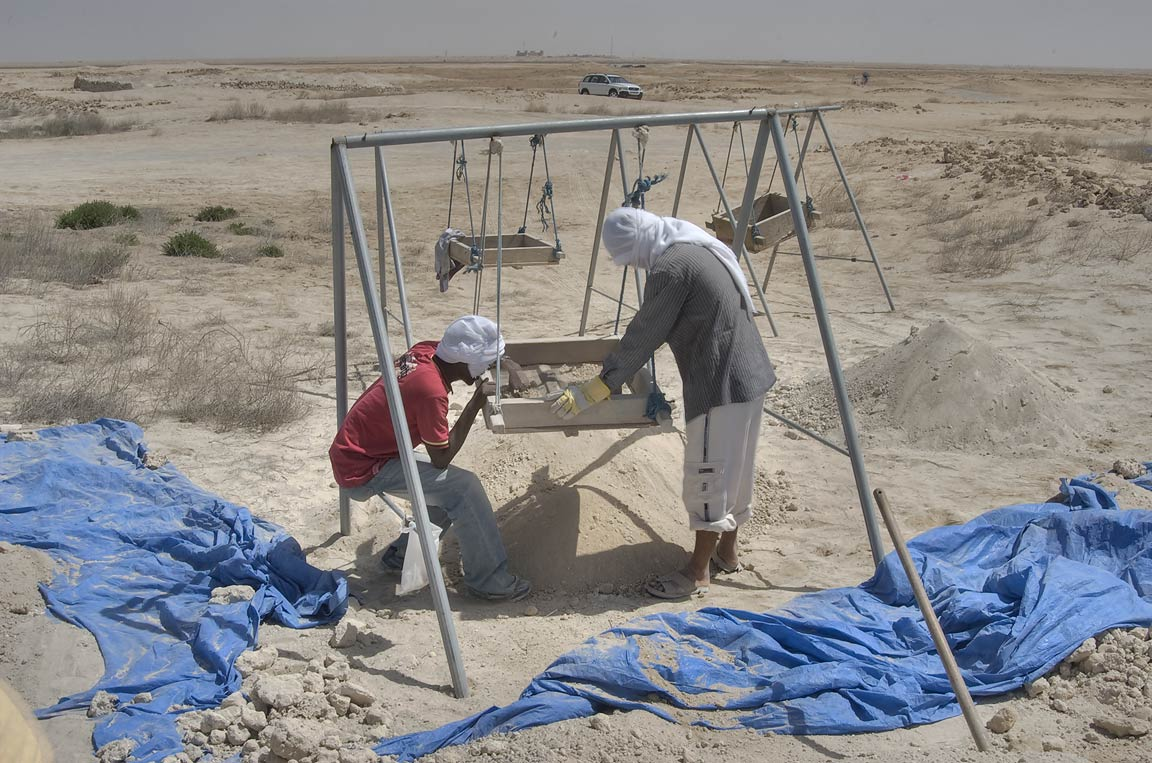
Excavations in Zubarah in 2010

The QIAH project carried out a complete topographic survey of the Zubarah site, the adjacent Murair site, and the Al Zubara Fort. Archaeological excavations have been undertaken at Zubarah and Qal`at Murair, supported by landscape studies in the hinterland. Numerous sites belonging to different chronological periods have been identified and recorded, and exploratory excavations have been conducted at a number of important localities, especially Freiha and Fuwayrit.

A team from the University of Hamburg recorded the architectural remains of Zubarah in great detail with a 3D scanner. To preserve the architectural remains, a restoration program has been launched using a special, saline-resistant mortar and plasters to maximise the visitor experience, while abiding by UNESCO heritage guidelines. The conservation work aims to preserve the authenticity of the site, as well as to preserve areas that can be enjoyed by visitors to the site through, among other means, interactive displays on mobile devices.

== Sovereignty disputes ==
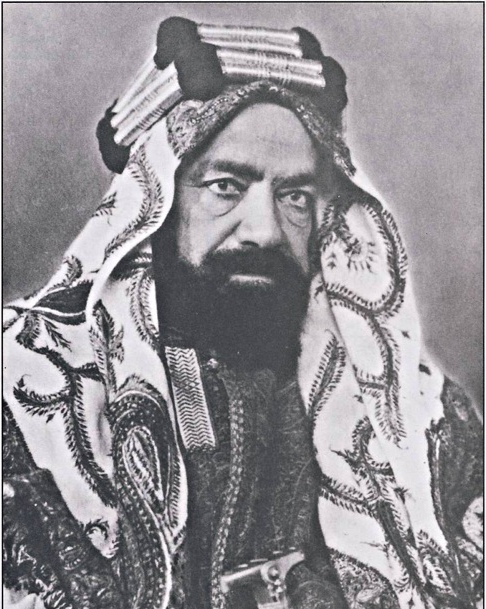
Hamad bin Isa Al Khalifa

There have been separate claims made by Qatar and Bahrain over the territory of Zubarah since the time of Ottoman rule. Following the signing of the 1868 sovereignty treaty by the Al Thani, the earliest recorded disagreement over ownership occurred in 1873, when the Bahraini emir claimed sovereignty over Zubarah after he received false news of a military party that was supposedly en route to sack Zubarah. In 1937, prior to the start of the 1937 Qatari–Bahraini conflict, Hamad bin Isa Al Khalifa of Bahrain alerted the local political resident to the long-running dispute. He, in turn, referred the issue to the political resident in Bushehr. The political resident in Bushehr wrote back, stating:

Personally I am of opinion that Zubara definitely belongs to Qatar but I am writing to His Majesty's Government, pending their decision you should avoid giving any opinion at all to Bahrain Government on the matter including the fact that I am referring the question.

Hamad ibn Isa wrote again to the political resident in Bahrain in 1939 to inform him that Abdullah Al Thani had constructed a fort in Zubarah. He contended that the construction was illegal because he held sovereignty over the land. A settlement was reached in 1944 during a meeting mediated by the Saudis, in which Qatar recognized Bahrain's customary rights, such as grazing, and visiting with no formalities necessary. However, Abdullah broke the accord when he constructed a fort in the town. The strenuous relationship between the two countries improved in 1950 after Ali Al Thani ascended to the throne.

In 1953, Bahrain again reiterated its claims over Zubarah when it sent a party of students and teachers to Zubarah who proceeded to write 'Bahrain' on the walls of Al Zubara Fort. Furthermore, the Bahrain Education Department published maps that alleged Bahraini sovereignty over the entire northwest coast of the peninsula. Ali responded by occupying the fort in 1954 and later added police in 1956.

Following the independence of Qatar from the British Empire in 1971, Bahrain continued to dispute Qatari sovereignty over Zubarah until the case was settled in Qatar's favour by a ruling from the International Court of Justice in 2001.

The issue of sovereignty came up again following the onset of the Qatar diplomatic crisis. In June 2018, the Bahrain Center for Strategic, International and Energy Studies (DERASAT) held a conference on the history of the Al Khalifa family's control of Qatar until 1868, during which they urged the Bahraini government to renew its claims over Zubarah. In August, the King of Bahrain Hamad bin Isa Al Khalifa publicly met with the Naim tribe, natives of Zubarah who in the past professed allegiance to the King of Bahrain, and said in a statement that "we will not forget the illegal aggression against Zubarah", referring to Sheikh Abdullah Al Thani's excursion against the Naim tribe in 1937.

== In popular culture ==
An independent and modernized Zubarah (spelled Zubara) is the setting for much of Larry Correia's and Micheal Kupari's military thriller Dead Six.

== See also ==
- Bani Utbah
- History of Qatar
- History of Bahrain
