= Mohammed bin Khalifa Al Khalifa =

- Emir of Qatar
- Reign: 1765—1773
- Born: Unknown; Al-Hadar, Saudi Arabia
- Died: March 25, 1773
- Burial: Qatar
- Issue: Khalifa bin Mohammed Al Khalifa, Ahmed ibn Muhammad ibn Khalifa, Ali bin Mohammed Al Khalifa
- House: House of Khalifa
- Father: Khalifa bin Faisal Al Jumaili Al-Thalabi in Wa'il

Sheikh Mohammed bin Khalifa bin Faisal Al Jumaili Al Khalifa Al Thalabi ibn Wa'il (Arabic: الأمير محمد بن خليفة بن فيصل الجميلي التغلبي الوائلي, was an Emir of Qatar and founder of the city of Zubarah as well as a founding ancestor of the House of Khalifa. Al Jumaili was born his tribe’s original hometown of Al-Hadar, a village in the Al-Aflaj Province of the Riyadh Region of Saudi Arabia, south of Najd. From there he moved to Kuwait and then to Qatar, where he ruled from 1765 until his death in 1773.

== Early life and background ==
Mohammed bin Khalifa bin Faisal Al Jumaili Al-Thalabi ibn Wa’il belonged to the Al-Jumeila, itself a subgroup of the Taghlib. The Al-Jumeila were descended from Ka'b ibn Zuhayr bin Jashim bin Habib bin Amr bin Ghanam bin Dithar/Taghlib ibn Wāʾil ibn Qasit ibn Hinb ibn Afṣā ibn Duʿmī ibn Jadīla ibn Asad ibn Rabīʿa ibn Nizār ibn Maʿadd ibn Adnān. Najd historian Hamad bin Mohammed bin Laboun Al’Wail noted that “Taghlib ancestry was found in many prominent Arab families, including the Banu Hanifah and Banu Shukr and many citizens of Khaybar, often ruling Al-Aflaj in the past.”

== Life ==
Born the son of a tribal chief named Khalifa in Al-Hadar, Bin Khalifa moved to Kuwait with his father as a result of intra-tribal disputes. After his father’s death, Bin khalifa came to an agreement with his cousins that his Al Khalifa clan would govern local merchants while the House of Al Sabah would rule the land and the Al Jalahma would rule the sea. However, internecine disputes left the Al Jalahma in charge of Ar-Ruʼays region of northern Qatar while the Al Sabah and Al Khalifa moved to other areas. Bin Khalifa would eventually rule the entire region.

=== Emigration from Kuwait ===
There are several versions of the story of why the Al Khalifa, descended from a leading branch of the Bani Utbah tribal confederation, left Kuwait. In the version recounted by Muḥammad ibn Kahlīfa ibn Ḥamd ibn Mūsā al-Nabhānī (a teacher at the Mecca madrasa) in his 1924 edition of Al-Tuḥfat al-Nabhānīya fī tārīkh al-jazīra al-ʻArabīya (“Nabhani Offering on the History of the Arabian Peninsula”), he states it as follows:

In 1766, one of Bin Khalifa’s ships was anchored in Shadegan carrying dates when it was raided by bandits, upon which the crew struck back killing attackers including one from the Banu Ka'b. The ship quickly returned to Kuwait, but the Ka’b Sheikh Barakat requested Bin Khalifa’s son as a hostage to avenge, and while Abdullah I Al-Sabah was willing to accompany him and seek forgiveness, Bin Khalifa preferred to pay the diya (compensation) in lieu of giving up his son to the aggressors. Al-Sabah insisted Bin Khalifa take the ultimatum for fear of Kuwait’s inability to hold off a Ka’b invasion, so Bin Khalifa asked and gained permission to leave Kuwait.

Other accounts hold that the 1766 dispute was a less dramatic disagreement between the cousins and brothers-in-law of unspecified origin that allowed the Al Khalifa to move to Zubarah in exchange for giving up the profits. The Al Jalahma, upon Al-Sabah’s refusal of their import dues, followed suit.

== Achievements ==
Bin Khalifa built the city of Zubarah with his sons. The local scholar Uthman ibn Sanad al-Basri, who died in 1826 and witnessed the events of the 1783 Bani Utbah invasion of Bahrain including the Zand dynasty siege of Zubarah, wrote in his سبائك العسجد (“Golden Alloys”) that Bin Khalifa and Sheikh Muhammad bin Rizq (father of scholar Ahmed ibn Rizq) were the city’s founders. Rashid bin Fadhel Al Bin Ali of the Al Bin Ali dynasty writes the following on page 153 of his مجموع الفضائل (“Noble Tribes” or Majmoo al Fada’il):

The city predated Bin Khalifa, but he greatly expanded it by buying up pearl supplies from around Qatar, Bahrain, and elsewhere. He even bought at a loss just to build up his assets.

British sources confirm the Sheikh’s reconstructing the bulk of the city, including the walls and the Qal'at Murair about 1.5 kilometres (0.93 mi) outside the outer wall. A rampart was built to link the castle and the city, but never really extended fully across the uninhabited sabkha separating the two, through which a canal allowed small boats. The city thrived from the seventeenth to nineteenth centuries as a pearl hunting center and an entrepôt for trade between Europe and India.

== Death ==
Sheikh Mohammed bin Khalifa died in the Qal’at Murair in Qatar on March 25, 1773, and was buried there.

== Family ==
In 1708, Bin Khalifa married Fatima (or Maryam) bint Sabah Al Sabah: The marriage took place in the Saudi village of Subaih, and she was the daughter of Sheikh Sabah I bin Jaber, the founding Emir of Kuwait, by his wife, the sister of Sheikh Khalifa bin Muhammad Al-Utbi. They had five sons:

- Sheikh Khalifa bin Mohammed Al Khalifa (king of Zubara from 1776 to 1783), who married a woman from the Al Bin Ali clan born in Freita, Qatar
- Sheikh Ahmed ibn Muhammad ibn Khalifa, conqueror of Bahrain and first Emir there from 1783 to 1795, progenitor of the House of Khalifa and ninth-removed ancestor of King Hamad bin Isa Al Khalifa
- Sheikh Muqrin bin Mohammed Al Khalifa, married a woman from the Al Bukuwara tribe in 1762 in Zubara
- Sheikh Ali bin Mohammed Al Khalifa
- Sheikh Ibrahim bin Mohammed Al Khalifa
