= Freiha =

Freiha فريحة
- Abandoned village
- Location within Qatar
- Coordinates: 25°59′43″N 51°01′35″E
- Country: Qatar
- Municipality: Al Shamal

Area
  - Total: 0.5 km^{2} (0.19 sq mi)

Freiha (Arabic: فريحة, romanized: Furayḥah) is a small deserted village on the north-western coast of the Qatar Peninsula in the Al Shamal municipality. It lies in the Zubarah region, located 3 km (1.9 mi) north of Zubarah town. It was founded by members of the Utub tribal confederation in the late 17th century after migrating from Najd in central Arabia.

The age and origin of the settlement is unknown, however excavations and historical documents suggest that it was at its peak in the 17th–18th century, almost certainly pre-dating its larger neighbour Zubarah. The village covers an area of approximately 50 hectares, extending for 700 m (2,300 ft) north to south along the coast and approximately 200 m (660 ft) east to west inland. It is sited around a shallow bay.

== Etymology ==
The name Freiha comes from the Arabic word faraihah, which means "joy".

== History ==
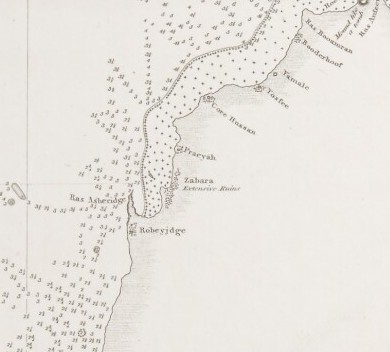
An 1824 map depicting Freiha as Fraeyah.

Sometime before 1698, the Bani Utbah clans, comprising families from the Anaza tribe including the Al Sabah, Al Khalifa, and Al Jalahma, migrated from the Najd region of central Arabia in response to prolonged drought. Their migration path took them through Al Aflaj, Qatif, and Al Ahsa, eventually reaching Freiha.

Upon settling in Freiha, the Utub formed an alliance with local Qatari tribes, most notably the Al-Maadeed, a powerful clan affiliated with Bani Khalid, as well as the Al Sulaim. This coalition became known as the Bani Utbah, which later expanded to include other Najdi and Banu Tamim families. They established Freiha as a fortified coastal hub with access to maritime trade routes and pearling waters. After tensions with the dominant Al Musallam, a Bani Khalid tribe under nominal Ottoman support, they departed for Iraq in 1716, followed by Kuwait.

In the 1760s, several families of the Bani Utbah returned to Qatar's northwest coast from Kuwait and settled in Zubarah, a short distance away from Freiha. Shortly after, the Al Bin Ali branched off and resettled Freiha. Following the Bani Utbah invasion of Bahrain in 1782, Nasr Al-Madhkur, the Persian-appointed governor of Bahrain, led a counter-attack against Zubarah and Freiha in May 1783. Zubarah was besieged for nearly a month. In December 1783, Persian forces landed between Zubarah and Freiha and launched a final assault. They were repelled in a decisive battle by a coalition of local Qatari tribes, which included the Al Maadeed of Freiha. The Persian army was routed, and its remnants fled the battlefield.

In J. G. Lorimer's Gazetteer of the Persian Gulf published in 1904, Freiha was described as a place 3 miles south of Al Khuwayr which had a few trading boats and approximately 150 inhabitants, most of whom were fishermen.

Freiha was among the villages occupied by Abdullah bin Jassim Al Thani's forces in July 1937 during the 1937 Qatari–Bahraini conflict, in which he led a military expedition against the Al Jabor faction of the Al Naim tribe, whom he considered to be defectors to Bahrain.

== Qal'at Freiha ==
One of the main features of the site is the partially excavated and conserved Qal'at Freiha, a high fortified building measuring approximately 45 m^{2} (480 sq ft), with evidence of corner towers in the Islamic style, excavated and conserved in 2005. Inside the fort a variety of domestic structures were found, including store rooms and date presses (madbassat).

== Mosque ==
Close to the centre of the settlement and the fort, the village's second largest structure was excavated. The architecture and alignment suggests that this building was a mosque. Elements such as a mihrab, minbar, a well for washing, and an open courtyard all closely mirror other later Qatari mosques.

== Domestic architecture ==
The domestic structures of Freiha appear typical of the Persian Gulf region and the time period. They consist of small stone built rooms, frequently with small open courtyards attached to them. Where excavations have been carried out, these structures appear to undergo constant remodelling throughout their lifespan, often with small rooms and sub divisions being added. Finds evidence in the form of stone fishing weights, large amounts of fish bones and the presence of extensive tidal fish traps suggests a primarily marine based economy. It seems likely from archaeological evidence, that the first occupation of the site was in temporary structures, and shelters prior to more permanent, mud and then stone dwellings being built.

== Archaeology ==
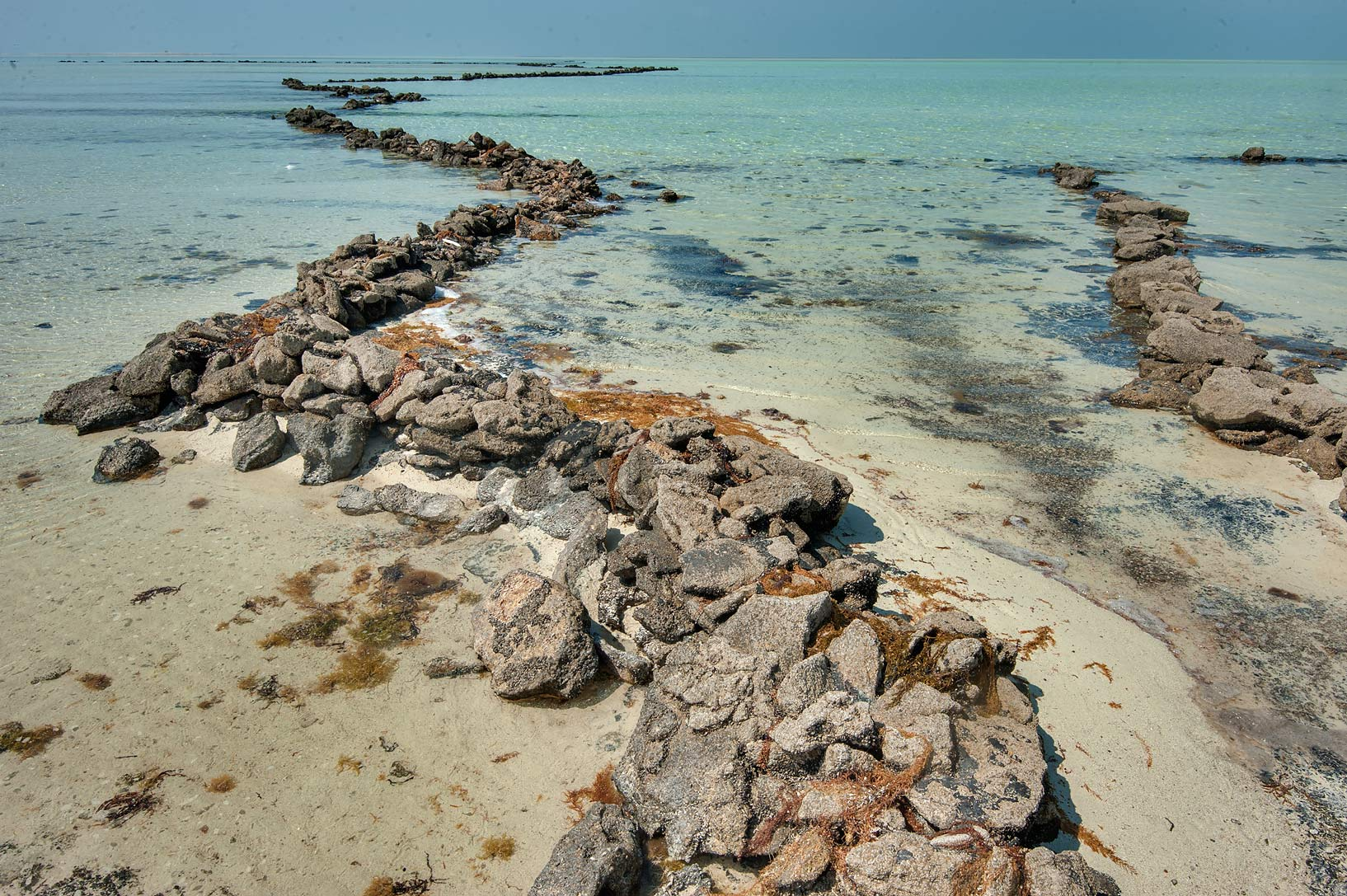
Intertidal stone fish traps at Freiha.

The site was investigated by Qatari archaeologists in 2005. More recently in 2009, the QMA, jointly with the University of Copenhagen, launched the Qatar Islamic Archaeology and Heritage Project (QIAH), a ten-year research, conservation and heritage initiative, to investigate sites in the Al Zubarah hinterland. The project is an initiative by the Qatar Museums Authority's Chairperson Sheikha Al-Mayassa bint Hamad Al Thani and Vice-Chairperson Sheikh Hassan bin Mohamed Al Thani. The QIAH project has carried out a complete topographic survey of the site of Freiha, allowing a map to be produced. This has led to a new series of excavations on the site, targeted at a central mosque, several domestic structures, and middens (rubbish dumps) surrounding the settlement.

=== Rock art ===
In 1956, Geoffrey Bibby and Peter Glob discovered several hundred cup-marks carved in rock in Freiha. The sizes range from 5 to 23 cm (2.0 to 9.1 in) and have a depth of 2 to 10 cm (0.79 to 3.94 in), with most being 5 cm (2.0 in) in diameter and having a depth of 1 to 3 cm (0.39 to 1.18 in). Bibby and Glob noted that the cup-marks are similar to those found in Bahrain dating to the Dilmun period. Several hand and footprints were also documented in Freiha.

Geometrical designs were recorded at Freiha in four places. They measure 11 to 15 cm (4.3 to 5.9 in) in width and 11 to 12 cm (4.3 to 4.7 in) in height. Peter Glob believed that they were carved by an ancient fertility cult. This theory was disputed by archaeologist Muhammad Abdul Nayeem, who believes that they are abstract symbols or tribal marks.

Danish archaeologist Hans Kapel recorded a total of 303 rock carvings at Freiha during his 1983 survey of Qatar.

== Gallery ==
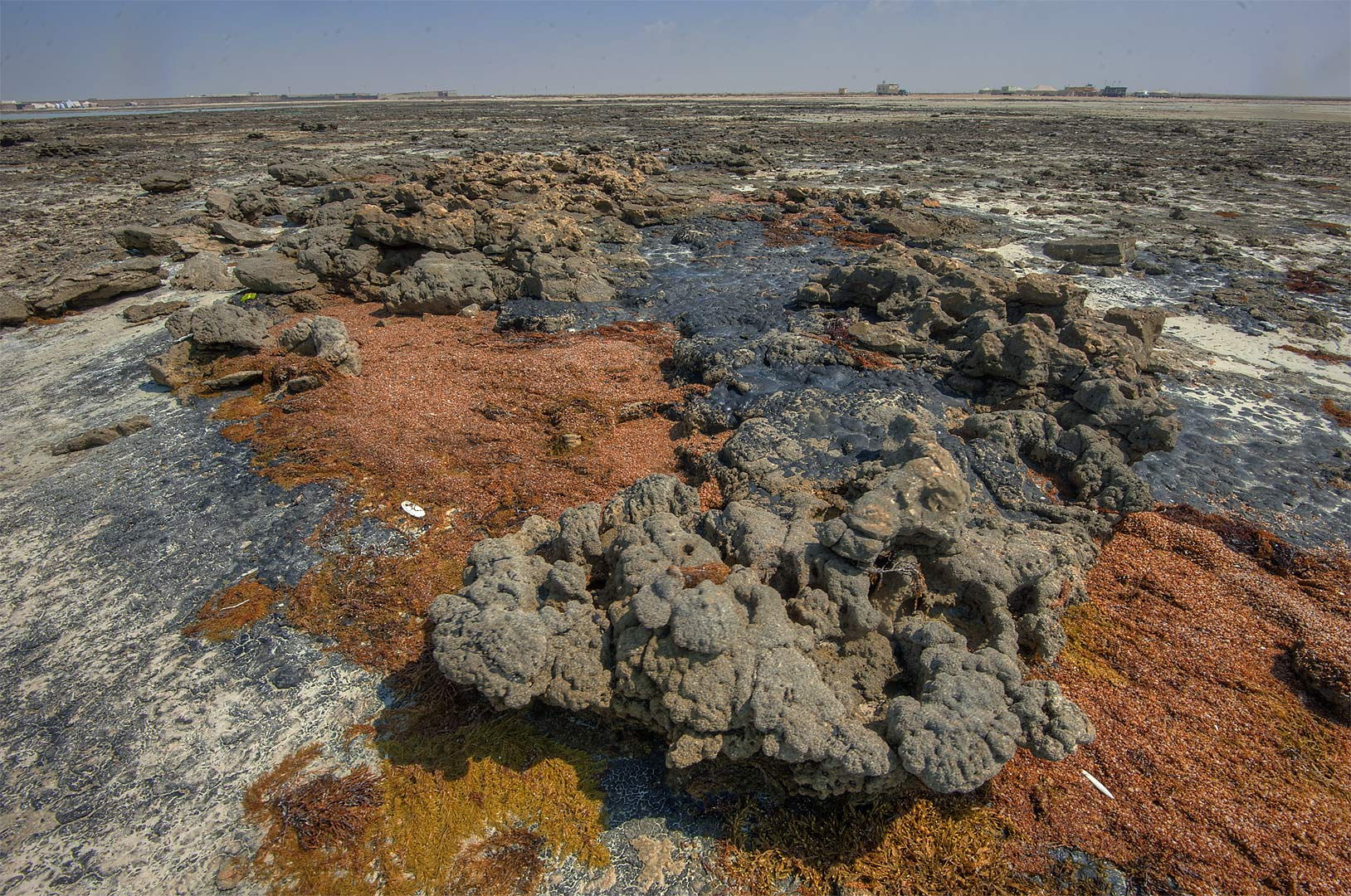
Beachrock covered with oil in Freiha.

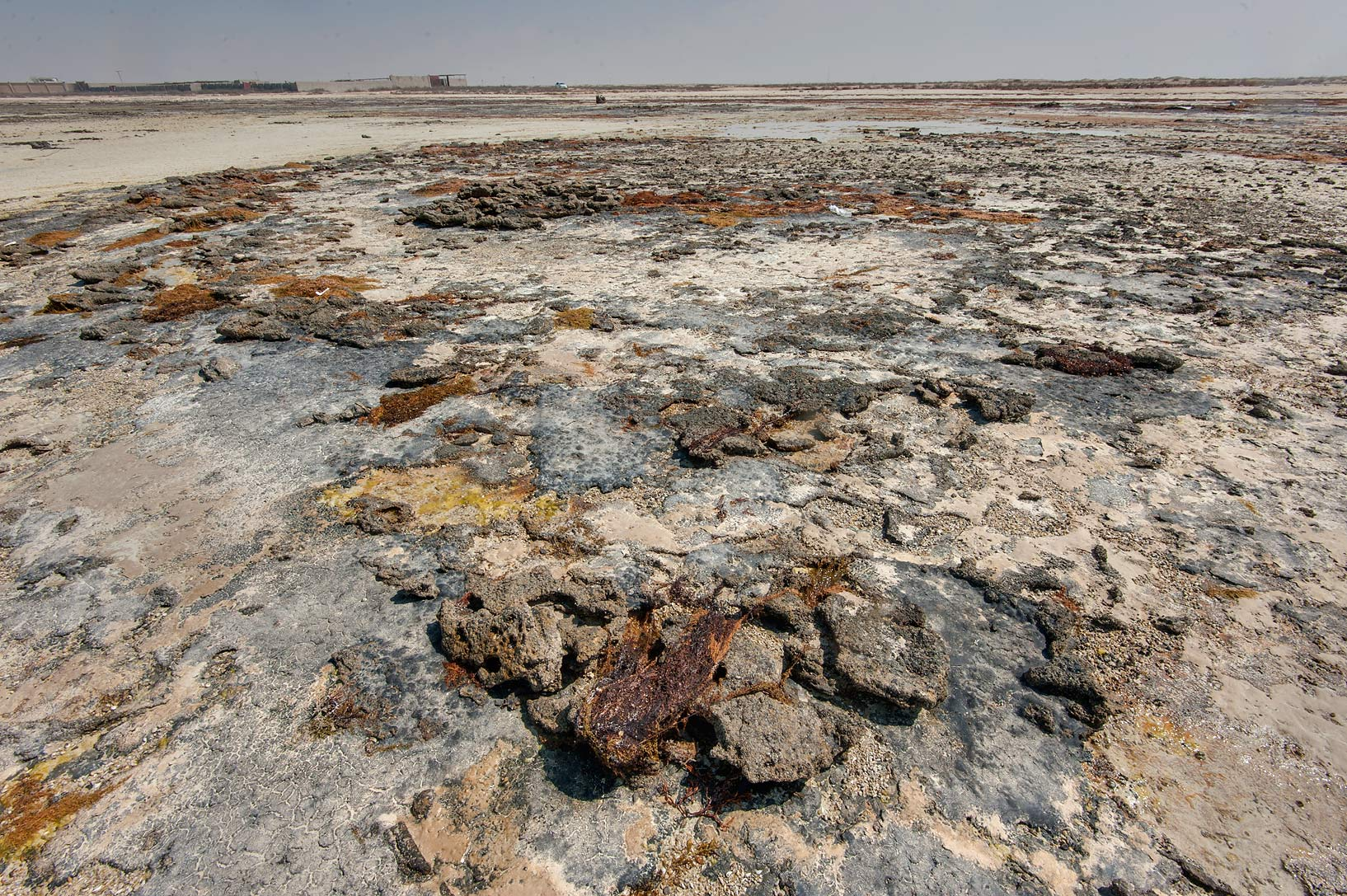
Beachrock in Freiha.
