= 1768 =

1768 in various calendars
- Gregorian calendar: 1768; MDCCLXVIII
- Ab urbe condita: 2521
- Armenian calendar: 1217; ԹՎ ՌՄԺԷ
- Assyrian calendar: 6518
- Balinese saka calendar: 1689–1690
- Bengali calendar: 1174–1175
- Berber calendar: 2718
- British Regnal year: 8 Geo. 3 – 9 Geo. 3
- Buddhist calendar: 2312
- Burmese calendar: 1130
- Byzantine calendar: 7276–7277
- Chinese calendar: 丁亥年 (Fire Pig); 4465 or 4258 — to — 戊子年 (Earth Rat); 4466 or 4259
- Coptic calendar: 1484–1485
- Discordian calendar: 2934
- Ethiopian calendar: 1760–1761
- Hebrew calendar: 5528–5529
- Hindu calendars
- Vikram Samvat: 1824–1825
- Shaka Samvat: 1689–1690
- Kali Yuga: 4868–4869
- Holocene calendar: 11768
- Igbo calendar: 768–769
- Iranian calendar: 1146–1147
- Islamic calendar: 1181–1182
- Japanese calendar: Meiwa 5 (明和５年)
- Javanese calendar: 1693–1694
- Julian calendar: Gregorian minus 11 days
- Korean calendar: 4101
- Minguo calendar: 144 before ROC 民前144年
- Nanakshahi calendar: 300
- Thai solar calendar: 2310–2311
- Tibetan calendar: མེ་མོ་ཕག་ལོ་ (female Fire-Boar); 1894 or 1513 or 741 — to — ས་ཕོ་བྱི་བ་ལོ་ (male Earth-Rat); 1895 or 1514 or 742

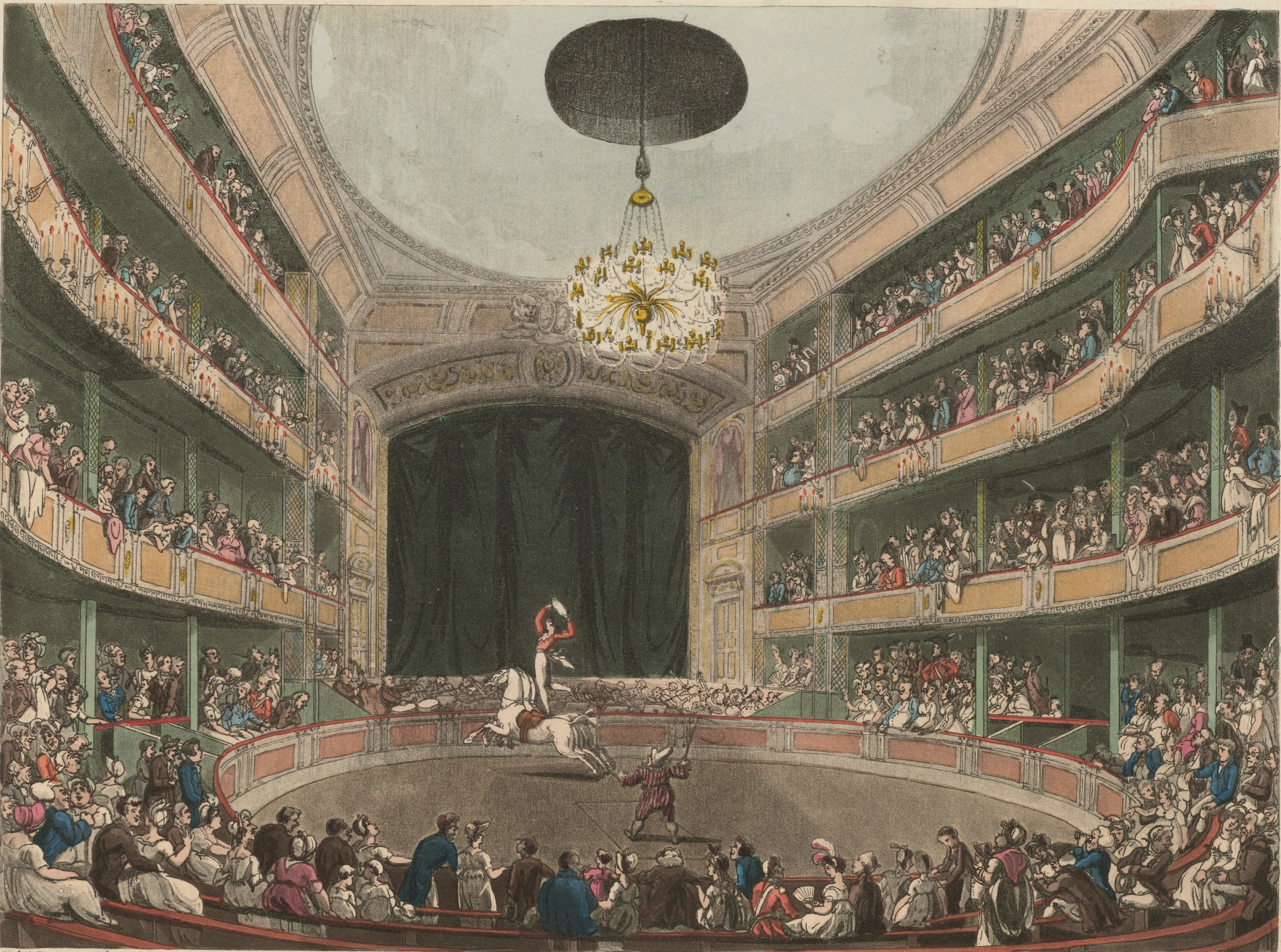
January 9: Philip Astley presents first modern circus.

1768 (MDCCLXVIII) was a leap year starting on Friday of the Gregorian calendar and a leap year starting on Tuesday of the Julian calendar, the 1768th year of the Common Era (CE) and Anno Domini (AD) designations, the 768th year of the 2nd millennium, the 68th year of the 18th century, and the 9th year of the 1760s decade. As of the start of 1768, the Gregorian calendar was 11 days ahead of the Julian calendar, which remained in localized use until 1923.

== Events ==
=== January–March ===
- January 9 – Philip Astley stages the first modern circus, with acrobats on galloping horses, in London.
- February 11 – Samuel Adams's circular letter is issued by the Massachusetts House of Representatives, and sent to the other Thirteen Colonies. Refusal to revoke the letter will result in dissolution of the Massachusetts Assembly, and (from October) incur the institution of martial law to prevent civil unrest.
- February 24 – With Russian troops occupying the nation, opposition legislators of the national legislature having been deported, the government of Poland signs a treaty virtually turning the Polish–Lithuanian Commonwealth into a protectorate of the Russian Empire.
- February 27 – The first Secretary of State for the Colonies is appointed in Britain, the Earl of Hillsborough.
- February 29 – Five days after the signing of the treaty, a group of the szlachta, Polish nobles, establishes the Bar Confederation, to defend the internal and external independence of the Polish–Lithuanian Commonwealth against Russian influence, and against King Stanisław August Poniatowski.
- March 1 – King Louis XV decrees that all cities and towns in France will be required to post house numbering on all residential buildings, primarily to facilitate the forced quartering of troops in citizens' homes.
- March 17
  - Britain's Superintendent of Indian Affairs, Sir William Johnson, concludes a peace agreement with the leaders of the Six Nations of the Iroquois Confederacy (the Mohawk, Onondaga, Oneida, Cayuga, Seneca and Tuscarora tribal nations) of the northern American lands, and with Chiefs Oconostota and Attakullakulla of the Cherokee nation in the southern American lands.
  - Prithvi Singh begins a reign of 10 years as the new Raja of Jaipur (part of the modern-day Indian state of Rajasthan), 12 days after the death of Madho Singh.
- March 27 – Catherine the Great of Russia dispatches troops under General Pyotr Krechetnikov to intervene in a civil war in Poland, at the request of Poland's King Stanisław August Poniatowski, a move that will ultimately lead to the Partitions of Poland.

=== April–June ===
- April 4 – The Cotopaxi volcano erupts in what is now Ecuador, at the time part of the Spanish Viceroyalty of Nueva Granada, covering the towns of Hambato and Tacunga with ash, but not causing fatalities.
- April 5 – The New York Chamber of Commerce, first of its kind in the American colonies, is founded by 20 New York merchants at Bolton and Sigel's Tavern at 54 Pearl Street in New York City. Former New York City mayor John Cruger Jr. is elected the Chamber's first president.
- May 10 – Massacre of St George's Fields: John Wilkes is imprisoned for writing an article for The North Briton, severely criticising King George III. This action provokes protesters to riot; in the Southwark district of London, troops fire on the mob, killing seven.
- May 15 – After the Treaty of Versailles, the island of Corsica is ceded by Genoa to France.
- June 14 – The largest mass meeting ever held in New England, up to this time, takes place at the Old South Church to support a petition demanding that the British remove a ship which has been hindering navigation in Boston Harbor.
- June 20 – Russo-Turkish War (1768–1774): Russia captures the fortress of Bar.

=== July–September ===
- July 1–3 – Louis Antoine de Bougainville, on his circumnavigation westbound, sails through the Bougainville Strait and along the north shore of Bougainville Island in the Solomons.
- July 14 – The massacre of Polish people (most likely by the Russians) at the village of Balta, now a part of Ukraine but at the time an Ottoman Empire town on the frontier with Poland, leads to the Russo-Turkish War.
- July 18 – "The Liberty Song", the first American patriotic song, is published in the Boston Gazette and includes the refrain "In freedom we're born".
- July 25 – The Imperial Court of China's Emperor Qianlong and his three senior grand councilors, Fuheng, Yenjisan and Liu T'ung-hsun, issues a directive to officials in the Zhejiang, Jiangsu and Shandong provinces warning them about the need to respond to rumors of sorcery.
- August 7 – The palace of the Ottoman Grand Vizier is destroyed by a fire in Constantinople
- August 26 – James Cook departs from Plymouth aboard HMS Endeavour on his first voyage of discovery.
- August 27 – Almost all merchants and traders in the British colony of New York sign a pact not to import British manufactured goods as long as the Townshend Acts are in effect, nor to do business with nonassociators to the pact.
- August 30 – A fire burns much of the Library of the Vatican.
- September 16 – Louis XV appoints René de Maupeou as Grand Chancellor of France (an office he will hold until 1790), and orders him to crush the judicial opposition.
- September 22–29 – The Massachusetts Convention of Towns, assembling in Boston, resolves on a written objection to the impending arrival of British troops rather than more militant action but causes panic in London.

=== October–December ===
- October 1 – The British Army's 29th Infantry Regiment of foot soldiers, which will carry out the Boston Massacre on March 5, 1770, arrives in Boston Harbor along with three other regiments. The 700 foot soldiers march through the Massachusetts colony's capital as a show of force and begin their occupation. Within a year, there will be "nearly 4,000 armed redcoats in the crowded seaport of 15,000 inhabitants."
- October 4 – The Sultan Mustafa III of the Ottoman Empire begins the Russo-Turkish War after the Russians refuse to withdraw troops from Poland.
- October 14 – William Pitt resigns from his position as Prime Minister of Great Britain.
- October 15 – A powerful hurricane sweeps across Cuba during the Festival of Santa Teresa, killing hundreds of people. Spain's King Carlos III begins a precedent of ordering the colonial government to fund disaster relief, a task previously left to the Catholic Church.
- October 17 – Representatives of the Cherokee nation sign the Treaty of Hard Labour with British representative John Stuart and relinquish all claims to the land between the Ohio River and the Allegheny Mountains, now the United States state of West Virginia.
- October 29 – French colonists in Louisiana refuse to accept the colony's acquisition by Spain and begin an uprising that forces Spanish Governor Antonio de Ulloa to flee.
- November 5 – The Treaty of Fort Stanwix is signed between the five nations of the Iroquois Confederacy (the Mohawk, Onondaga, Oneida, Cayuga, and Seneca) relinquishing their claims to territory south of the Ohio River to the British.
- December 1 – The slave ship Fredensborg sinks off Tromøya, Norway.
- December 10
  - The Royal Academy is founded in London, with Joshua Reynolds as its first President.
  - The first of the weekly numbers of the Encyclopædia Britannica, edited by William Smellie, are published in Edinburgh; one hundred are planned.
- December 15 – The king's refusal to sign state documents results in the December Crisis (1768) in Sweden.
- December 21 – King Prithvi Narayan Shah unifies several small kingdoms to establish modern-day Nepal; this dynasty will end in 2008.

=== Date unknown ===
- The Petit Trianon, originally designed for Madame de Pompadour, is completed in the park of the Palace of Versailles, and inaugurated by Louis XV.
- New Smyrna, Florida, the largest attempt at colonization by the British in the New World, is founded by Dr. Andrew Turnbull.
- The Steller's sea cow, discovered on Bering Island in 1741, is driven to extinction.
- The Complete Farmer: Or, a General Dictionary of Husbandry, written by "A Society of Gentlemen", a group of members of the Society for the Encouragement of Arts in Britain, concludes publication in weekly numbers and is first published in book form.
- Mohammed bin Khalifa Al Khalifa, the founder of the Al Khalifa dynasty, constructed Qal'at Murair in the town of Zubarah in present-day Qatar. The fortress served to consolidate his control over Zubarah and neighboring tribes.

== Births ==
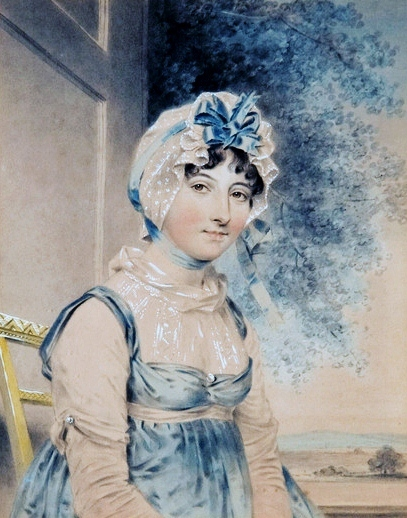
Maria Edgeworth

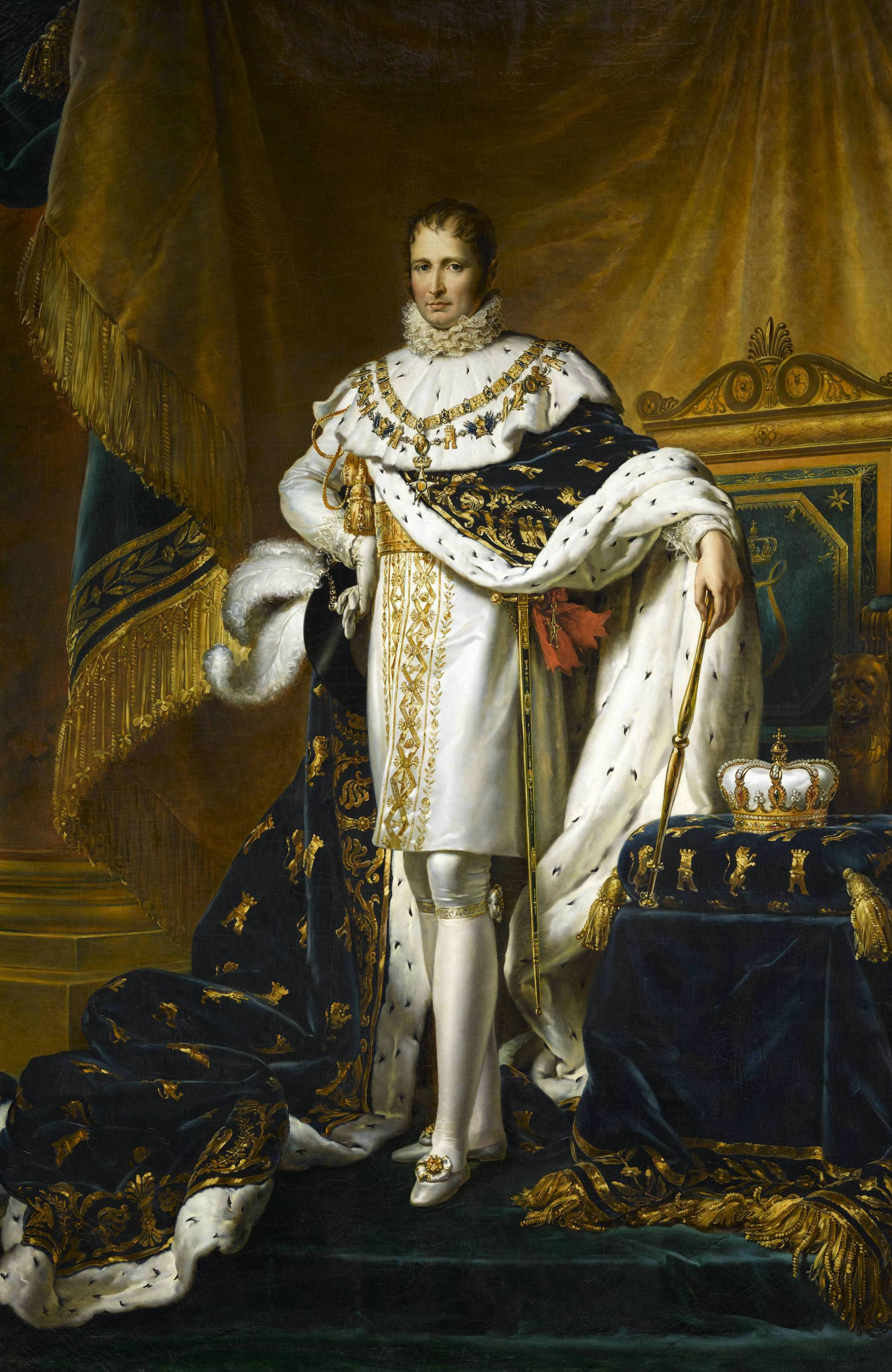
Joseph Bonaparte

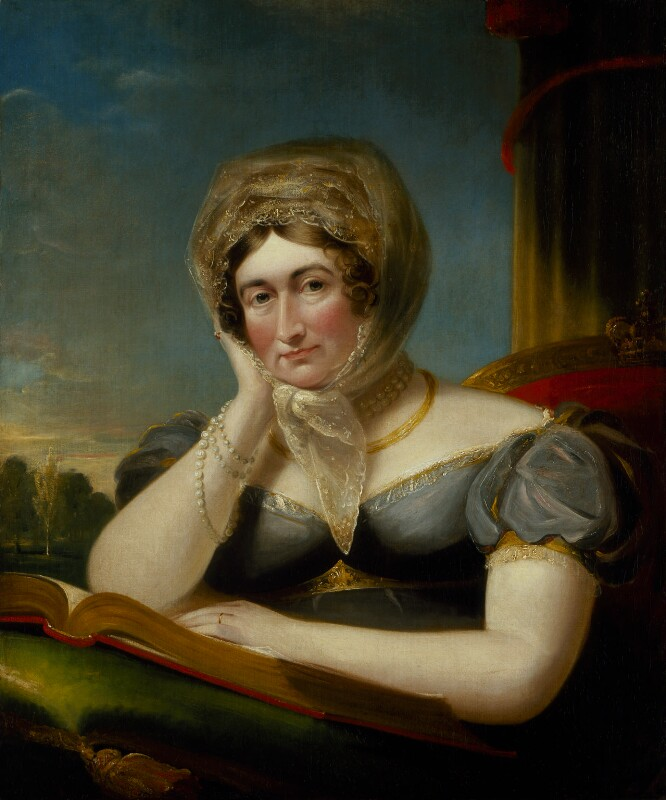
Caroline of Brunswick

- January 1 – Maria Edgeworth, Irish novelist (d. 1849)
- January 7 – Joseph Bonaparte, King of Naples and Spain (d. 1844)
- January 17 – Smith Thompson, American politician, Associate Justice of the Supreme Court of the United States (d. 1843)
- January 28 – King Frederick VI of Denmark (d. 1839)
- February 12 – Francis II, Holy Roman Emperor (d. 1835)
- February 13 – Édouard Mortier, Duke of Trévise, French marshal (d. 1835)
- March – Tecumseh, Native American (Shawnee) chief (d. 1813)
- March 21 – Joseph Fourier, French mathematician, physicist (d. 1830)
- March 22 – Melesina Trench, Irish born writer and socialite (d. 1827)
- May 3 – Charles Tennant, Scottish chemist, industrialist (d. 1838)
- May 17
  - Caroline of Brunswick, queen of George IV of the United Kingdom (d. 1821)
  - Henry Paget, 1st Marquess of Anglesey, English general (d. 1854)
- June 9 – Samuel Slater, American industrialist (d. 1835)
- June 20 – William Findlay, American politician (d. 1846)
- June 24 – Lazare Hoche, French general (d. 1797)
- June 29 – Vincenzo Dimech, Maltese sculptor (d. 1831)
- July 4 – Adolph Carl August von Eschenmayer, German philosopher (d. 1852)
- July 20 – Praskovia Kovalyova-Zhemchugova, Russian serf, actress and opera soprano (d. 1803)
- July 27 – Charlotte Corday, French murderer of Jean-Paul Marat (d. 1793)
- August 6 – Jean-Baptiste Bessières, French marshal (d. 1813)
- August 29 – – John Fawcett, British actor (d. 1837)
- September 4 – François-René de Chateaubriand, French writer, diplomat (d. 1848)
- September 23 – William Wallace, Scottish Mathematician (d. 1843)
- September 28 – Pauline Léon, French feminist, radical (d. 1838)
- October 2 – William Beresford, 1st Viscount Beresford, British general and politician (d. 1854)
- October 6 – Josef Madersperger, Austrian tailor, inventor and sewing machine pioneer (d. 1850)
- October 31 – María Isidra de Guzmán y de la Cerda, Spanish scholar (b. 1803)
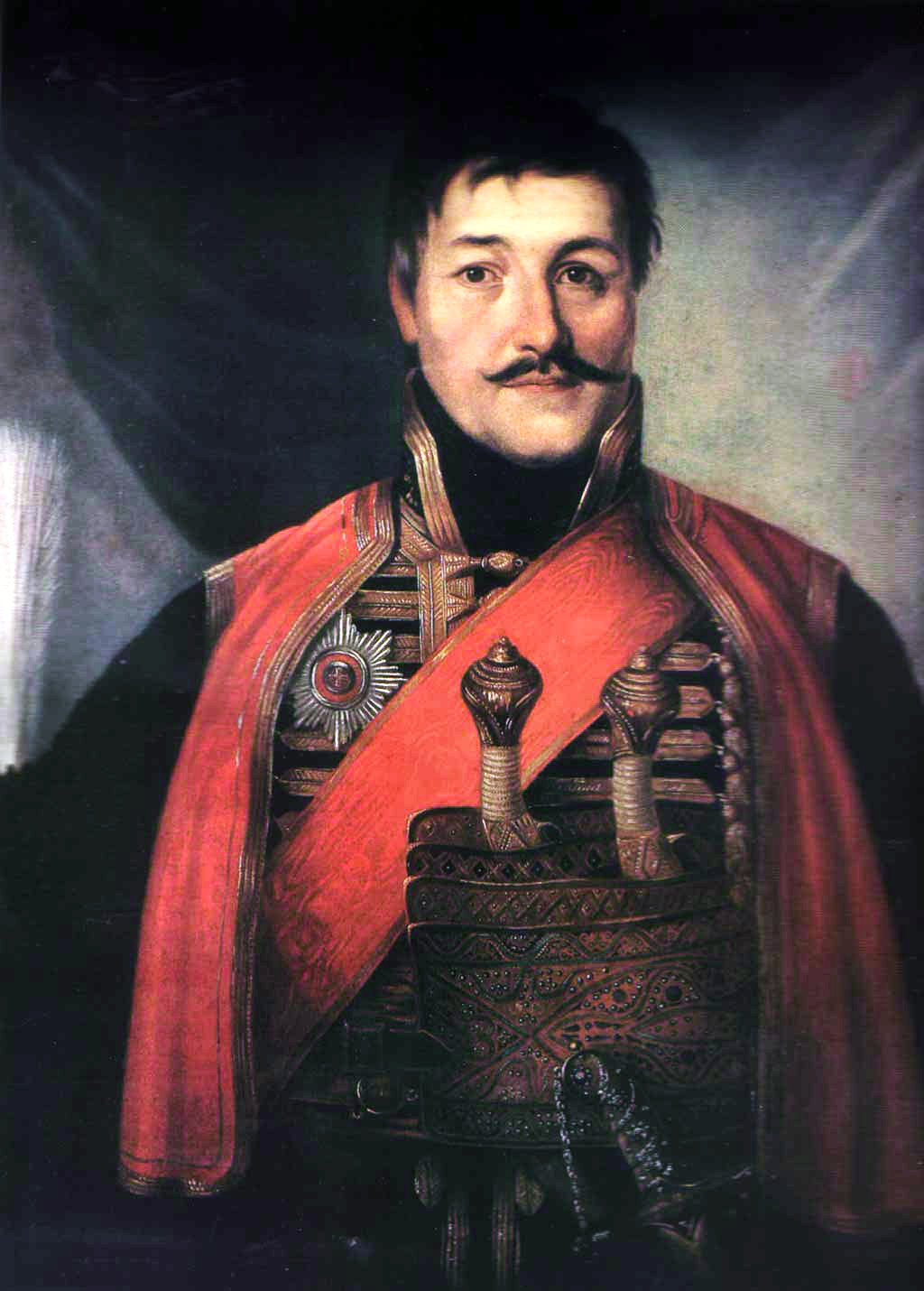
- Karađorđe
  November 3 – Karađorđe Petrović, leader of the First Serbian Uprising against the Ottoman Empire, founder of the Serbian Karađorđević dynasty (d. 1817)
- November 18
  - Zacharias Werner, German religious poet (d. 1823)
  - José Marchena Ruiz de Cueto, Spanish writer (d. 1821)
- November 21 – Friedrich Schleiermacher, German theologian (d. 1834)
- date unknown
  - Marie-Jeanne de Lalande, French astronomer, mathematician (d. 1832)
  - Wang Zhenyi, Chinese astronomer
  - María Remedios del Valle, Argentine soldier and patriot (d. 1847)
  - Amelia Griffiths, British phycologist (d. 1858)
  - William Thornhill, British Army officer (d. 1851)

== Deaths ==
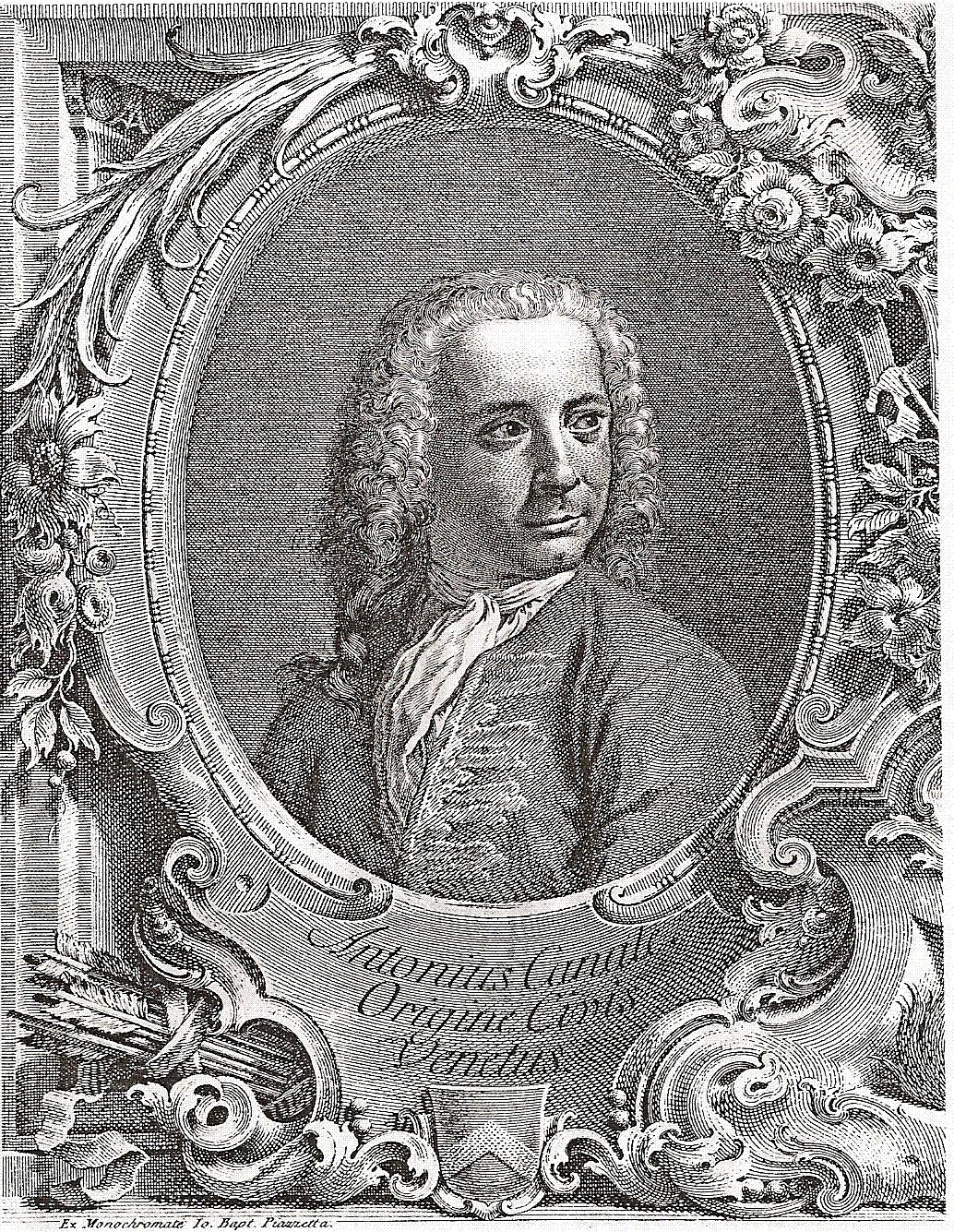
Canaletto

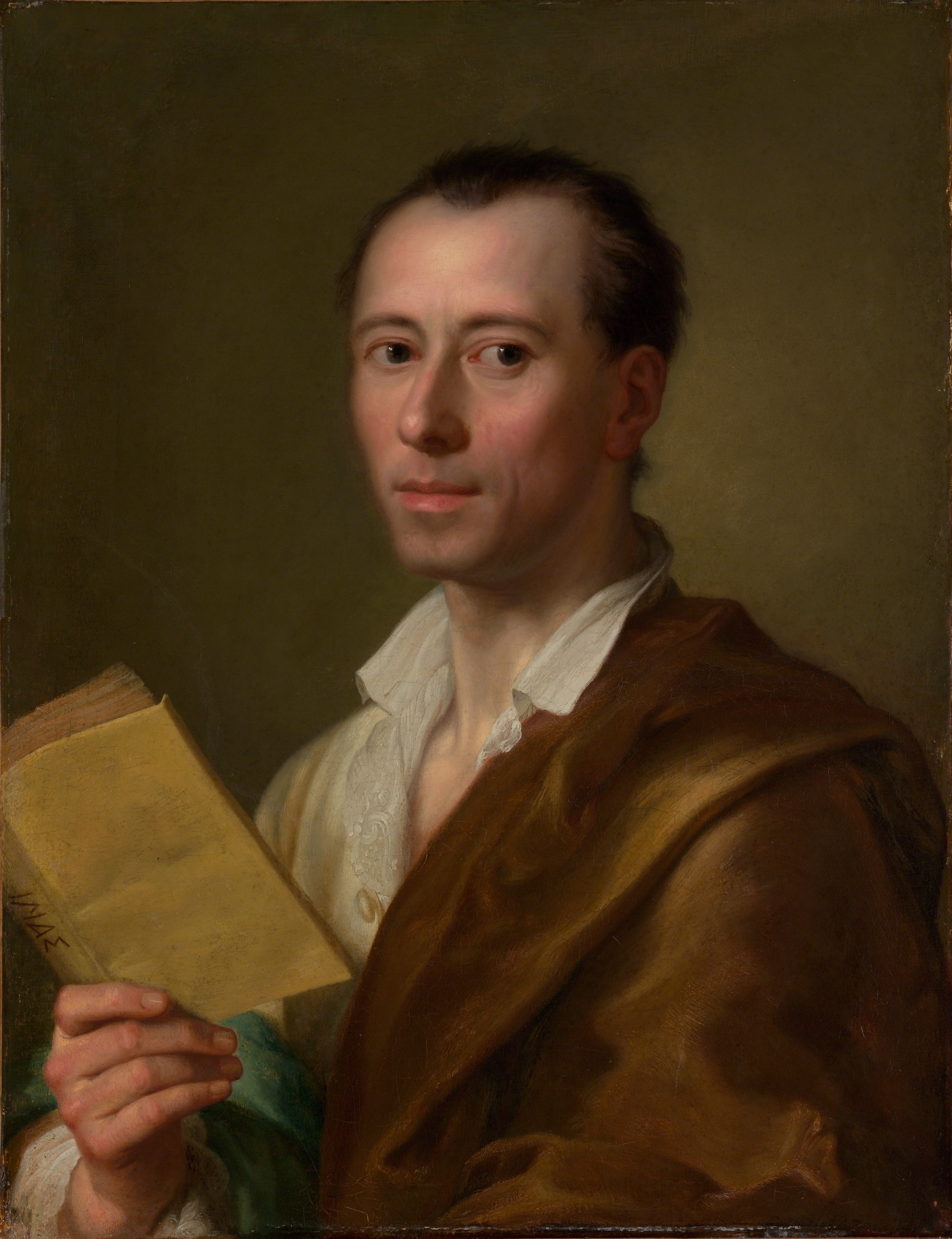
Johann Joachim Winckelmann

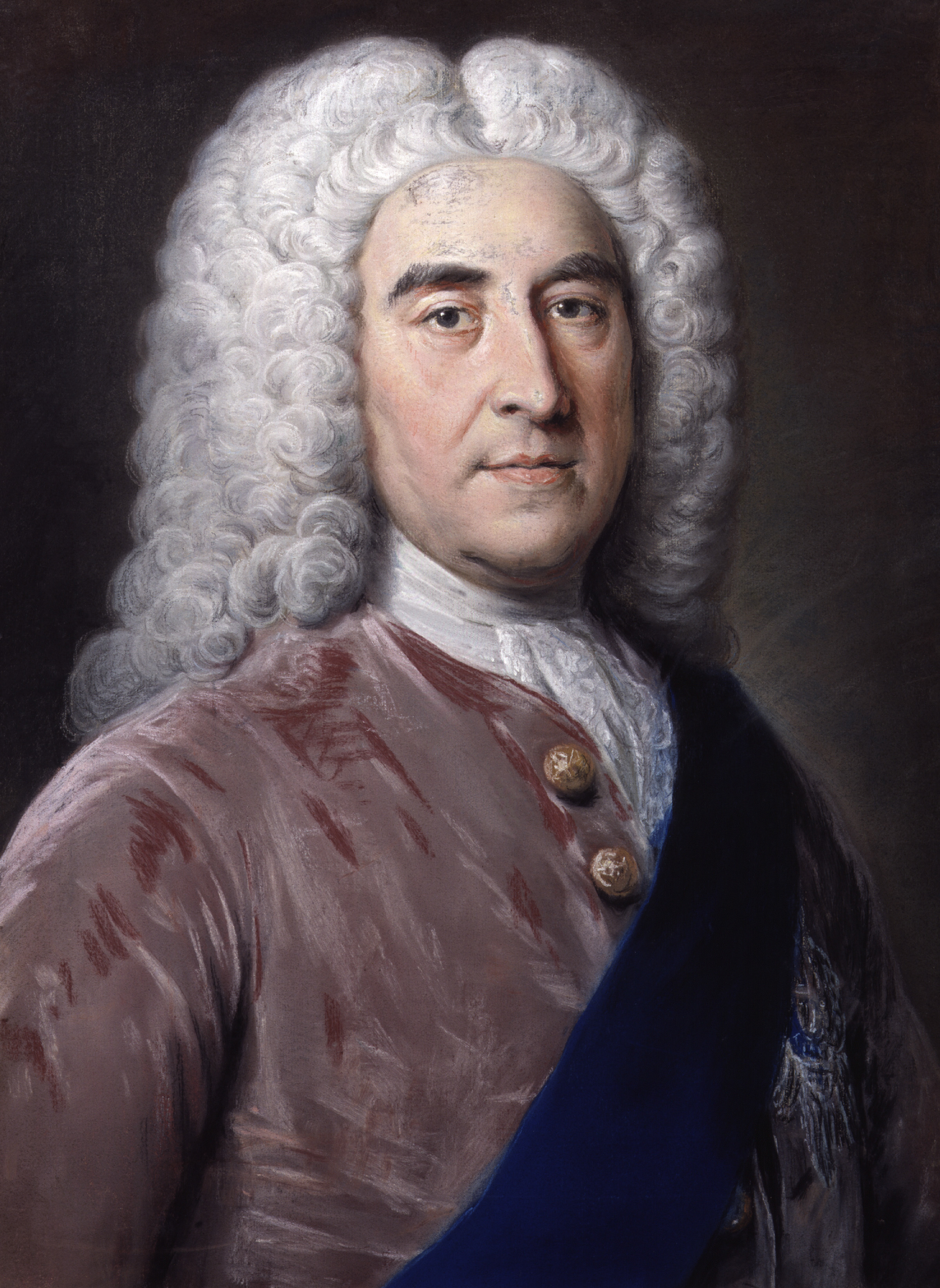
Thomas Pelham-Holles, 1st Duke of Newcastle

- January 20 – Sir Walter Bagot, 5th Baronet (b. 1702)
- February 1 – Sir Robert Rich, 4th Baronet, British cavalry officer (b. 1685)
- February 2 – Robert Smith, English mathematician (b. 1689)
- February 8 – George Dance the Elder, British architect (b. 1695)
- February 17 – Arthur Onslow, English politician (b. 1691)
- February 29 – John Mitchell, colonial American physician and botanist (b. 1711)
- March 1 – Hermann Samuel Reimarus, German philosopher, writer (b. 1694)
- March 3
  - Francis Fauquier, English statesman and Royal Governor of Virginia since 1758 (b. 1703)
  - Nicola Porpora, Italian composer (b. 1686)
- March 11 – Giovanni Battista Vaccarini, Italian architect (b. 1702)
- March 18 – Laurence Sterne, Irish writer (b. 1713)
- April 9 – Sarah Fielding, English writer (b. 1710)
- April 19 – Canaletto, Italian artist (b. 1697)
- April 29 – Georg Brandt, Swedish chemist, mineralogist (b. 1694)
- May 30 – Harry Grey, 4th Earl of Stamford, British earl and politician (b. 1715)
- June 8 – Johann Joachim Winckelmann, German classical scholar, archaeologist (b. 1717)
- June 15 – James Short, Scottish mathematician (b. 1710)
- June 19 – Benjamin Tasker, Provincial Governor of Maryland (b. 1690)
- June 28 – George Hadley, English lawyer and amateur meteorologist (b. 1685)
- July 6 – Conrad Beissel, German-born American religious leader (b. 1691)
- July 11 – José de Nebra, Spanish composer (b. 1702)
- July 24 – Nathaniel Lardner, English theologian (b. 1684)
- August 3 – Thomas Secker, Archbishop of Canterbury (b. 1693)
- August 17 – Vasily Trediakovsky, Russian poet (b. 1703)
- September 2 – Antoine Deparcieux, French mathematician (b. 1703)
- September 11 – Joseph-Nicolas Delisle, French astronomer (b. 1688)
- October 1 – Robert Simson, Scottish mathematician (b. 1687)
- October 8 – Pierre Simon Fournier, French typographer (b. 1712)
- October 17 – Louis VIII, Landgrave of Hesse-Darmstadt (b. 1691)
- October 28 – Michel Blavet, French flutist (b. 1700)
- October 31 – Francesco Maria Veracini, Italian composer (b. 1690)
- November 14 – John Bristow, English merchant, politician (b. 1701)
- November 16 – Hans von Lehwaldt, German general (b. 1685)
- November 17 – Thomas Pelham-Holles, 1st Duke of Newcastle, Prime Minister of Great Britain (b. 1693)
- December 8 – Jean Denis Attiret, French Jesuit missionary, painter (b. 1702)
- December 14 – Ulla Tessin, Swedish countess (b. 1711)
- December 20 – Carlo Innocenzo Frugoni, Italian poet (b. 1692)
- date unknown – Elsie Marley, English alewife (b. 1713)
