= Al Bidda =

Al Bidda البدع
- District
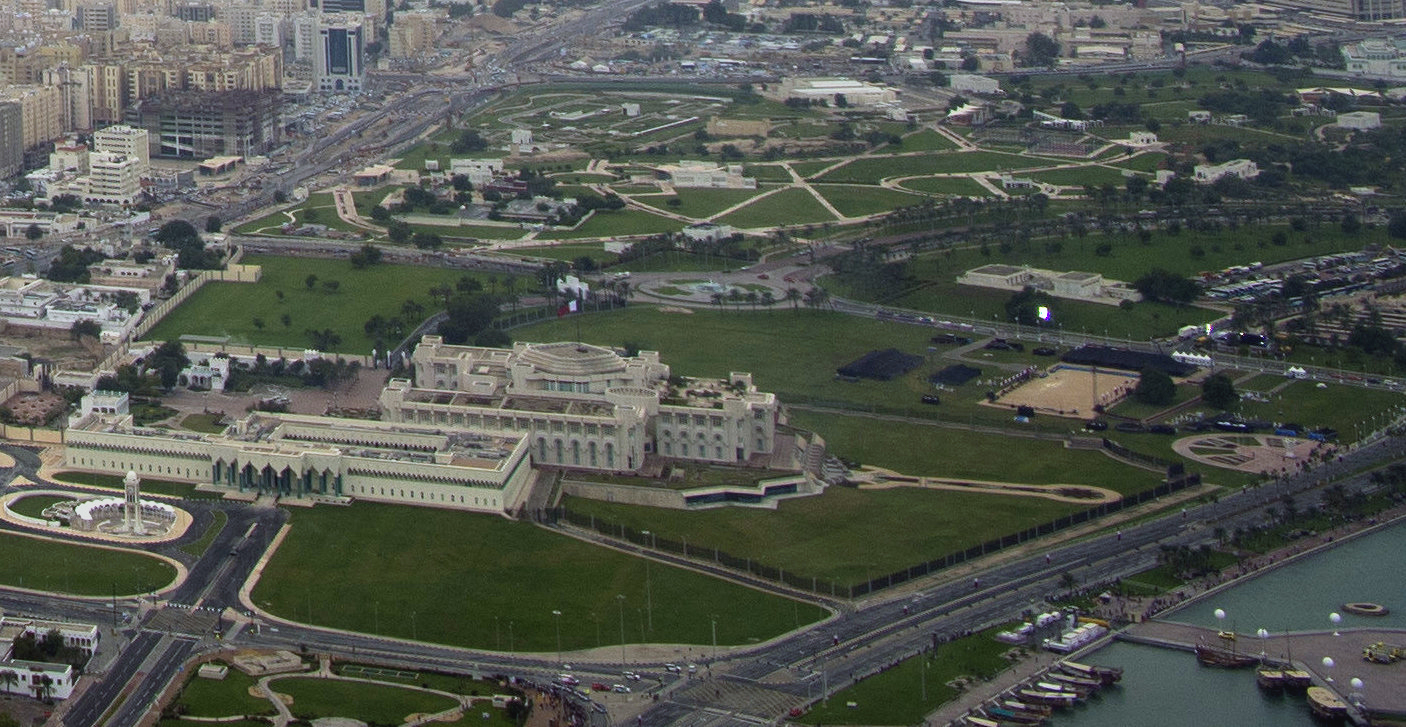
- Aerial view of the Amiri Diwan and Al Bidda Park.

- Al Bidda Al Bidda (Qatar) Al Bidda (Middle East) Al Bidda (Asia) Al Bidda (Earth)
- Coordinates: 25°17′59″N 51°31′11″E
- Country: Qatar
- Municipality: Doha
- Zone: Zone 2, Zone 12
- District no.: 2

Area
  - Total: 1.3 km^{2} (0.50 sq mi)

Population
  - Total: 1,102
  - Density: 850/km^{2} (2,200/sq mi)

Al Bidda (Arabic: البدع) is a neighborhood of Doha, Qatar. During the 19th century it was the largest town in Qatar, before Doha, an offshoot of Al Bidda, grew in prominence. Al Bidda was incorporated as a district in the Doha municipality in the late 20th century.

Qatar's Amiri Diwan has been based in Al Bidda since 1915, after being converted from an abandoned Ottoman fort.

== Etymology ==
Bidda is derived from the Arabic word bada'a, meaning "to invent". When the previously uninhabited area first became populated, a settlement was essentially invented, hence the name.

== History ==
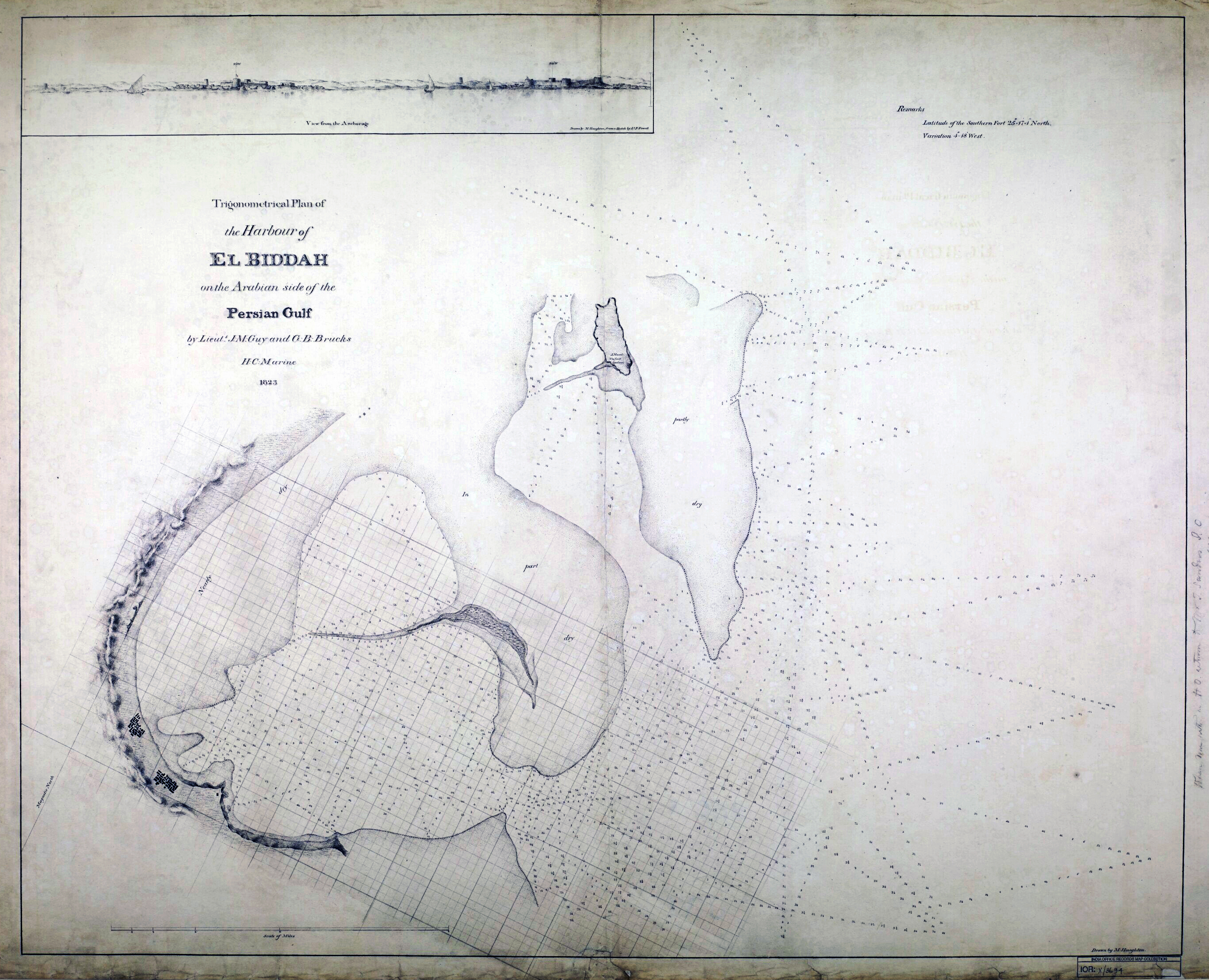
‘Trigonometrical plan of the harbour of El Biddah on the Arabian side of the Persian Gulf’, 1823.

The earliest documented mention of Al Bidda was made in 1681, in a Carmelite convent's account which chronicles several settlements in Qatar. In the record, the ruler and a fort at "Bide" are referred to.

=== 19th century ===
Al Bidda became the most important town in the country after the decline of Zubarah in the early nineteenth century. Doha, the present-day capital, developed from Al Bidda. David Seaton, a British political resident in Muscat, detailed one of the earliest English accounts of Al Bidda in 1801:

Bedih [sic] is Situated in 25.18 N. Lat. and is a large open bay full of Coral banks with very unequal soundings from twelve to three fathoms, the land is low and sandy, hardly to be seen at the distance of ten Miles, on a nearer approach, it seems gradually rising from both extremes towards the centre, where it forms a ridge at the distance of half a Mile from the Shore, under this ridge near the sea, are two hillocks and a Valley between them, off each of the hillocks runs a Shoal with half a fathom at high water and between them a Channel with one and a half fathoms, and at the distance of a Mile and a half three fathoms, on the Northern hillock is a fortified House with a Wall and Square tower, in the Valley a breast Work with two Guns, and on the southern hillock two large huts with some kind of defence, and half a Mile to the Southward near the ridge is another Square building with a flag staff, under the Northern hillock is a sandy beach on which two Buglas, one Dow & one Botella were drawn up with a breast work of Stones, the only direct landing place is in the mouth of the Valley, but it would be attended with great loss without ships to drive the Enemy away as it is flanked by the breast work and boats, in which were a number of Men and ten Guns, and fronted by the two Guns in the Valley, about two Miles to the South is a Sandy beach without cover for the Enemy's snipers, but the Square building with the flagstaff must be stormed before the hillocks can be got at.

==== The 1821 bombardment ====
Following alleged piracy and breaches of a maritime peace agreement, the HCS Vestal Brig bombarded Al Bidda in 1821. This was the first documented bombardment, in a series of subsequent bombardments. Historical accounts usually label this event as the 1821 bombardment of "Al Bidda."

In January 1823, political resident John MacLeod visited Al Bidda to meet with the ruler and initial founder of Doha, Buhur bin Jubrun, who was also the chief of the Al-Buainain tribe. MacLeod noted that Al Bidda was the only substantial trading port in the peninsula during this time. Following the founding of Doha, written records often conflated Al Bidda and Doha due to their extremely close proximity. Later that year, Lieutenant Guy and Lieutenant Brucks mapped and wrote a description of the two settlements. Despite being mapped as two separate entities, they were referred to under the collective name of Al Bidda in the written description. The effect of the bombardment was significant and long-lasting enough to be described by Lieutenant Guy and Lieutenant Brucks in 1822-1823.

==== The 1841 bombardment ====
Between 1839 and 1841, the British demanded Sheikh Salemin bin Nasir Al-Suwaidi (then the chief of Al-Suwaidi tribe) to handover Ghuleta, who they considered to be a pirate taking refuge in Al Bidda. Salmen handed him over, in addition to Jasim bin Jabir Raqraqi, who attacked a boat in Al Bidda.

The British demanded Salmen bin Naser Al-Suwaidi pay a fine of 300 dollars on account of the boat Jasim Raqraqi attacked. The British ships bombarded the fort, after Salmen was either not able to pay or was unwilling. The fine was subsequently paid in money and in jewelry, among other things.

==== The 1843 destruction/ruin of Al Bidda (The first destruction/ruin of Doha) ====
In 1843, Isa bin Tarif arrived to Al Bidda, protected by the East Indian company ships, and raising the Al Sulaimi flag. The British ships demanded the evacuation of Al Bidda and threatened its destruction if not evacuated. Sheikh Slamen Al-Suwaidi complied to avoid a further bombardment. Isa bin Tarif entered the fort of Sheikh Salmen Al-Suwaidi and took it as refuge. The homes belonging to Al-Suwaidi tribe were taken by Al Bin Ali, who came with Isa bin Tarif.

Isa bin Tarif rebelled against the House of Khalifa, leading to his death during the battle of Umm Suwaya in 1847. Following his death, Al Bidda was demolished by the sheikh of Bahrain and the Al Bin Ali were ordered back to Bahrain and ordered to return the fort and homes to Al-Suwaidi tribe. The doors, windows, and roofs were taken from the homes. This event was subsequently called the destruction/ruin of Al Bidda.

In 1848, Sheikh Mohammed bin Thani requested from Sheikh Nasser bin Salemen (Son of Sheikh Salmen bin Nasser) to settle in Al Bidda, which was granted and welcomed. During the following years, Sheikh Nasser Al-Suwaidi invited various tribes and families. The population of Al Bidda - Doha reached 6,000.

==== The 1852 blockade and the Qatari-Bahraini War ====
The sheikh of Bahrain placed an economic blockade over the town in 1852. In 1867, a large number of ships and troops were sent from Bahrain to punish the people of Al Wakrah and Al Bidda. Abu Dhabi joined on Bahrain's behalf due to the conception that Al Wakrah served as a refuge for fugitives from Oman. Later that year, the combined forces sacked the two Qatari cities with 2,000 men in what would come to be known as the Qatari–Bahraini War. A British record later stated "that the towns of Doha and Wakrah were, at the end of 1867 temporarily blotted out of existence, the houses being dismantled and the inhabitants deported".

==== The Battle of Al Wajbah ====
Around early 1871, the town became a base of operations for Bedouins resisting Ottoman rule after they established a foothold in Eastern Arabia that year. By December 1871, Emir Jassim bin Mohammed authorized the Ottomans to send 100 troops and equipment to Al Bidda. Shortly after, Qatar was assimilated as a province of the Ottoman Empire, and Al Bidda was recognized as the official provincial capital.

Al Bidda Fort served as the final stronghold for Ottoman troops in the 1893 Battle of Al Wajbah. They surrendered after Jassim bin Mohammed's troops cut off the town's water supply and besieged the fortress. An Ottoman report compiled the same year reported that Al Bidda and Doha had a combined population of 6,000 inhabitants, jointly referring to both towns by the name of 'Katar'. Al Bidda was classified as the western section of Katar, and was stated to have mainly accommodated members of the Al Kuwari and Soudan tribes.

=== 20th century ===
In J.G. Lorimer's Gazetteer of the Persian Gulf first published in 1908, he describes Al Bidda as a large town which is a natural harbor due to its reefs, but states that vessels of more than 15 feet draft cannot pass. The land is described as stony desert 12 or 15 metres (40 or 50 ft) above sea-level. At this time, according to Lorimer, "Bidda and Doha had joined together and were regarded as districts within a single large conurbation of districts which was then collectively known as Doha". The majority of its inhabitants, who were said to be involved in pearl fishing, were composed of Qatari tribes, such as the Al-Soudan, Bahraini shopkeepers and immigrants from Al-Hasa. Doha municipality was officially established in 1963, with Al Bidda as part of it.

== Geography ==
Al Bidda borders the following districts:

- Mushayrib to the south, separated by Al Rayyan Road.
- Al Jasrah to the east, separated by Mohammed Bin Jassim Street.
- Rumeilah (Zone 12) to the northwest, separated by Rumeilah Street, and Rumeilah (Zone 21) to the west by Onaiza Street.

== Landmarks ==
Al Bidda Park

- Al Sheukh Mosque on Al Qasr Street.
- Al Bidda Historical Tower on Umm Al Dome Street.
- Al Bidda Fort on Jebel Soudan.
- Al Bidda West Park on Al Rayyan Road.
- Qatar Bowling Centre (under the auspices of Qatar Olympic Committee) on Al Qurtubi Street.
- Amiri Diwan on Al Corniche Street.
- Al Bidda Clock Tower on Al Corniche Street.
- Al Bidda Park (formerly known as Rumaila Park) is partially located in Rumeilah on Al Corniche Street and is split into two parts by Rumeilah Street.

== Development ==
Al Bidda Tower, a 215 metres (705 ft)-tall building in the district, was completed in 2009. The building twists 60 degrees from bottom to top.

== Transport ==
Major roads that run through the district are Qalat Al Askar Street, Jassim Bin Mohammed Street, Corniche Street and Al Rayyan Road.

The underground Al Bidda station currently serves as an interchange station between the Red Line and the Green Line of the Doha Metro. As part of the metro's Phase 1, the station was inaugurated on 10 December, 2019, along with all other Green Line stations. It is located in Al Bidda Park on Al Rayyan Road. The station is one of the Doha Metro's most vital stations as it provides connectivity between two of the Doha Metro's three existing lines.

Among the station's facilities are an Ooredoo self-service machine, a prayer room and restrooms. Nearby landmarks within walking distance include Al Bidda Park and the Qatar Bowling Centre. There are no metrolinks for the station.

== Demographics ==
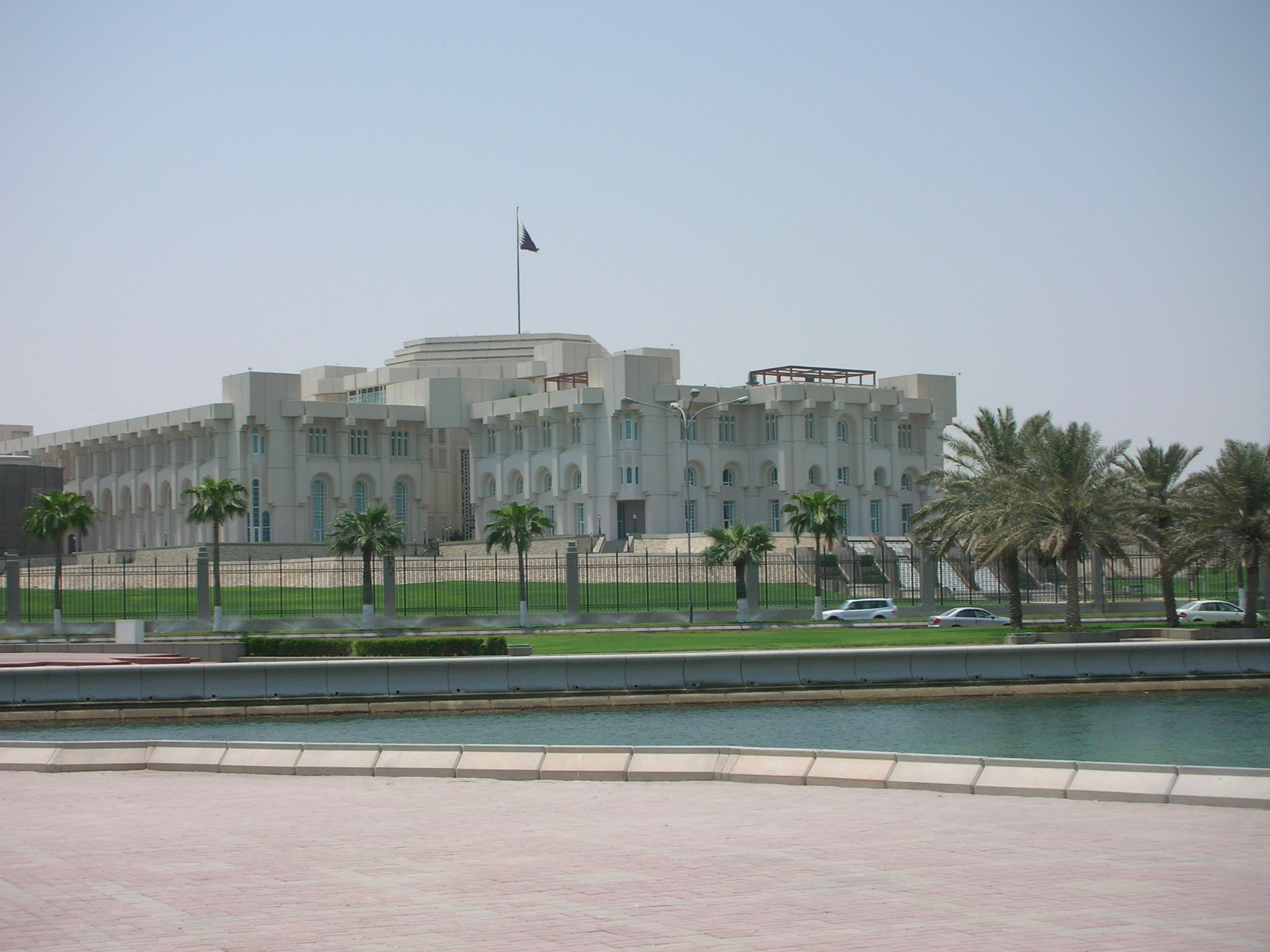
View of the Amiri Diwan in Al Bidda

As of the 2010 census, the settlement comprised 91 housing units and 6 establishments. There were 1,102 people living in the settlement, of which 98% were male and 2% were female. Out of the 1,102 inhabitants, 99% were 20 years of age or older and 1% were under the age of 20.

Employed people made up 99% of the population. Females accounted for 1% of the working population, while males accounted for 99% of the working population.

Year	Population
1986	4,436
1997	3,558
2004	1,379
2010	1,102

== Trigonometrical plan ==
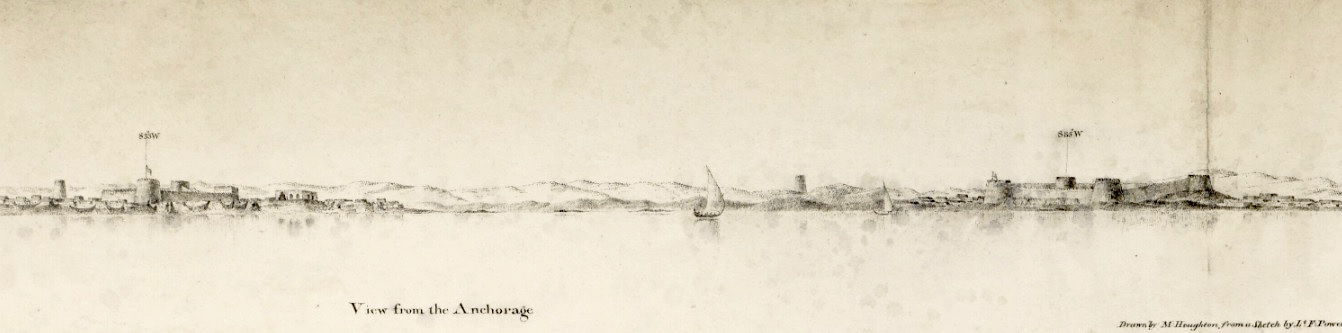
Trigonometrical plan of Al Bidda, 1823.
