= Rahmah ibn Jabir al-Jalhami =

Arab pirate

Rahmah ibn Jabir al-Jalahimah رحمة بن جابر بن عذبي الجلهمي أو الجلاهمة
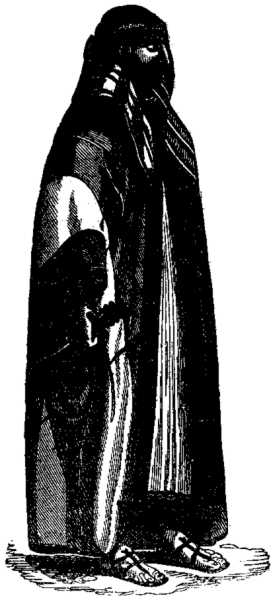
- A sketch of Rahmah ibn Jabir drawn by Charles Ellms in his 1837 book The Pirates Own Book
- Born: c. 1760; Grane (now Kuwait)
- Died: October 1826
- Piratical career
- Type: Captain
- Allegiance: Al Jalahma clan
- Years active: 19th century
- Rank: Captain
- Base of operations: Persian Gulf
- Commands: Al-Manowar; Al-Ghatroushah
- Battles: Bani Utbah invasion of Bahrain; Piracy in the Persian Gulf: Persian Gulf campaign of 1819; Battle of Khakeekera

Rahmah ibn Jabir ibn Adhbi al-Jalhami (Arabic: رحمة بن جابر بن عذبي الجلهمي; c. 1760 – 1826) was an Arab ruler in the Persian Gulf region and was described by his contemporary, the English traveler and author, James Silk Buckingham, as "the most successful and the most generally tolerated pirate, perhaps, that ever infested any sea."

As a pirate, he had a reputation for being ruthless and fearless. He wore an eyepatch after losing an eye in battle, which makes him the earliest documented pirate to have worn an eyepatch. He was described by the British statesman Charles Belgrave as "one of the most vivid characters the Persian Gulf has produced, a daring freebooter without fear or mercy".

He began life as a horse dealer, and used the money he had saved to buy his first ship and with ten companions began a career of piracy. He was so successful that he soon acquired a new craft, a 300-ton vessel, manned by 350 men. He would later have as many as 2,000 followers, many of them black slaves. At one point his flagship was the "Al-Manowar" (derived from English).

== Description ==
Rahmah was described by James Silk Buckingham:

Rahmah ben-Jaber's figure presented a meagre trunk, with four lank members, all of them cut and hacked, and pierced with wounds of sabres, spears, and bullets, in every part, to the number perhaps of more than twenty different wounds. He had, besides, a face naturally ferocious and ugly, and now rendered still more so by several scars there, and by the loss of one eye. When asked by one of the English gentlemen present, with a tone of encouragement and familiarity, whether he could not still dispatch an enemy with his boneless arm, he drew a crooked dagger, or yambeah, from the girdle round his shirt, and placing his left hand, which was sound, to support the elbow of the right, which was the one that was wounded, he grasped the dagger firmly with his clenched fist, and drew it backward and forward, twirling it at the same time, and saying, that he desired nothing better than to have the cutting of as many throats as he could effectually open with this lame hand! Instead of being shocked at the utterance of such a brutal wish, and such a savage triumph at still possessing the power to murder unoffending victims, I know not how to describe my feeling of shame and sorrow, when a loud burst of laughter, instead of execration, escaped from nearly the whole assembly, when I ventured to express my dissent from the general feeling of admiration for such a man.

== Name ==
His name, Rahmah ibn Jabir ibn Adhbi Al Jalhami, means Rahmah son of Jabir son of Adhbi of the Jalahimah. His name should be written "Al Jalhami" if transliterated from Arabic, as "Al Jalahimah" is the plural name for his tribe.

== Biography ==
=== Early life ===
Rahmah ibn Jabir ibn Adhbi al-Jalhami was born in Grane (present-day Kuwait) around 1760. Rahmah's father, Jabir bin Adhbi, led their tribe from Kuwait to Zubarah in Qatar around 1766. After his tribe migrated alongside the Al Khalifa, the two had a falling out after the Al Khalifa refused to share the economic gain made from trade ventures. Rahmah's tribe nonetheless agreed to fight alongside the Al Khalifa in their battle against the Persians in Bahrain in 1783. After Bahrain was annexed by the Al Khalifa, Rahmah's tribe, feeling dissatisfied with their share of the rewards, moved first to Bushehr and eventually to Khor Hassan in northwest Qatar. After a short time, Rahmah overtook his eldest brother Abdullah in a struggle for leadership of the tribe; consequently, the tribe adopted piracy as a livelihood.

His base in Khor Hassan, which would serve as his base of operation against the Al Khalifa, was surrounded by a protected bay which contributed to the area's defensive capabilities. He resided in a fort with mud walls with only a few huts in the vicinity. As a result of no centralized authority existing in Qatar from the 18th to 19th centuries, Rahmah was able to establish dominion over much of the peninsula for a period after the Al Khalifa relocated to Bahrain.

=== Alliance with the Saudis ===
Rahmah's alliances with regional powers tended to be on the basis of shared opposition to the Al Khalifa: he formed an alliance with the first Saudi dynasty when it conquered Bahrain, and he founded and relocated to the fort of Dammam in 1809. Though some of his exploits were deemed piratical by the British, J. G. Lorimer, a British historian, remarks on Rahmah's scrupulously correct conduct and his compliance with the laws of warfare. He generally avoided encounters with British cruisers so that he would not incur their anger. In 1809, after the British expedition of the Pirate Coast, many Qasimi refugees fled to Khor Hassan. Rahmah, the leader of Khor Hassan, reached a compromise with the British in which he agreed not to harbour any fugitivites in return for sparing the town. The British also sent a warning to the Saudi amir to demand the prevention of Rahmah from launching any attacks on the British.

He influenced the Saudis to launch an invasion of Bahrain in 1809. This greatly strengthened his position in Qatar, making him the most powerful tribal leader in the peninsula. Within a short duration, Rahmah had captured eighteen Utub vessels. However, in 1811, the combined forces of Said bin Sultan, Sultan of the Omani Empire and the Al Khalifa successfully drove the Wahhabi from Qatar and Bahrain. Rahmah then transferred his headquarters from Khor Hassan to his fort in Dammam.

=== Alliance with the Omanis ===
In 1816, he allied himself with the rulers of Muscat in their failed invasion of Bahrain, and broke his alliance with the Saudis. The Saudis then destroyed the fort of Dammam in July 1816, and he took refuge in Bushehr, bringing around 500 families with him. Said bin Sultan proposed that he become a subject of Muscat and settle in Oman, but Rahmah refused. He moved back to Dammam in 1818.

=== Subsequent campaigns ===
He assisted the British forces in the Persian Gulf campaign of 1819 against the Al Qasimi of Ras Al Khaimah. The operation was carried out after repeated incidents of piracy against British-flagged vessels by the Al Qasimi.

In January 1820, he and his crew were in preparation to launch a naval invasion of Bahrain from Qatif's port but aborted their plans after being warned by the British. The following month, he travelled to Shiraz with three vessels to offer his assistance to the prince of Shiraz in his planned expedition of Bahrain. His hostilities against Bahrain continued throughout 1821 and 1822; he and his crew went on to capture 7 Bahraini vessels and kill 20 men. He settled in Bushehr from November 1822 until February 1824, whereupon he returned to his residence in Dammam. He went to Muscat at the beginning of 1825 and assisted Sheikh Tahnoon Bin Shakhbout in his expedition against the Qasimi tribe of Ras Al Khaimah. Near the end of that year, he commenced a series of predatory attacks on Qatif as punishment for the non-payment of the protection tax owed to him. The British chose not to intervene in his actions provided his attacks were limited to the inhabitants of Qatif.

He soon reshifted his focus to the Al Khalifa and went to war with them at the beginning of 1826. After a great number of casualties on his side, he fled to Bushehr where he sought material and military assistance from the British political resident. Having failed to convince the British for aid, he set off to Dammam with a reinforcement of 35 Balochis from Bushehr and continued waging his war against the Al Khalifa.

=== Death ===
In October 1826, Rahmah launched a raid on a vessel owned by the Al Khalifa rulers of Bahrain. Upon discovering the stolen goods, his nephew, Sheikh Ahmed bin Salman Al Khalifa, decided to recover the items and intercept Rahmah at sea. To ensure he could reach his uncle swiftly, Sheikh Ahmed augmented his boat's speed by borrowing the oars from the vessel of Isa bin Tarif, the chief of the Al Binali tribe.

As the confrontation neared, Rahmah, who was nearly blind due to cataracts, noticed an approaching boat and inquired about its captain. When informed it was his nephew, Sheikh Ahmed, he ridiculed him, remarking, "The son of Maryoom sails?"—a reference to Ahmed's mother, Maryam, who was Rahmah's sister. His astonishment stemmed from maritime tradition, where young men typically only commanded ships after marriage, as this signified their readiness for responsibility. Rahmah retorted, "How can he set sail if he has not approached fair maidens?"

Sheikh Ahmed and his crew boarded Rahmah's ship, leading to a fierce sword fight. Realizing his death was imminent and learning that his loyal slave, Tarar, had been killed, Rahmah retreated to the inner galley of his ship with his eight-year-old son, Shaheen. There, he lit the gunpowder kegs with charcoal from his hookah causing the ship to explode, killing all of his men and the Al Khalifa men that were raiding his ship.

== Legacy ==
Rahmah's legacy lasted long after his death. In the 1960s, Charles Belgrave wrote of how old men in the coffee shops throughout the region would still talk of his exploits.

== See also ==
- Al Jalahma
- Battle of Khakeekera
- Piracy in the Persian Gulf
