= Battle of Khakeekera =

Date	March 1811
Location	Al Khuwayr
Result	Kuwaiti–Bahraini victory

Belligerents
Bahrain; Sheikhdom of Kuwait	Emirate of Diriyah

Commanders and leaders
Abdullah bin Ahmad Al Khalifa; Jaber bin Abdullah of Kuwait	Rahmah ibn Jabir al-Jalhami; Ibn Ufaysan

Units involved
200 ships	60 ships

Casualties and losses
1,000 dead	300 dead

The Battle of Khakeekera (Arabic: معركة خكيكرة) was a naval battle that took place in March 1811 between the combined forces of Bahrain (led by Abdullah bin Ahmad Al Khalifa) and Kuwait (led by Jaber I Al-Sabah) on one side, and those of the Emirate of Diriyah (or First Saudi State) led by Rahmah ibn Jabir al-Jalhami, the pirate Arab ruler of Dammam and some villages in Qatar, on the other. The battle took place northwest of Qatar and ended with a Bahraini victory.

== Background ==
King Saud bin Abdulaziz Al Saud wrote to Rahmah ibn Jabir al-Jalhami, ordering him to prepare an invasion in retaliation for the House of Khalifa renouncing Saudi suzerainty. To this end, the king sent his vassal troops from Najd, Al-Ahsa, and Qatif, and a fleet of 60 ships, under the leadership of the Saudi-appointed governor of Bahrain and Qatar, Ibn Ufaysan. Learning of this, Al Khalifa asked for aid from Al Sabah to repel the invasion.

== Chronology ==
=== Prelude ===
Once the Al Khalifa had recaptured and settled in Bahrain, they preemptively sent a fleet of sailing vessels toward the Qatari coast, where Rahmah and Ibn Ufaysan had taken shelter near Al Khuwayr. Both men had anticipated the possibility of conflict and had prepared their defenses in hopes of regaining control of Bahrain. The Al Khalifa, however, advanced under the cover of night and anchored their fleet offshore.

Upon seeing the glow of the approaching ships' lanterns, Rahmah suspected that the fleet was under the command of Sheikh Abdullah bin Ahmad Al Khalifa. Ibn Ufaysan dismissed the idea, stating that Sheikh Abdullah had been detained in Diriyah. Rahmah disagreed, arguing that the formation and silence of the fleet was the work of a skilled commander, and thus dispatched a scouting vessel with a lamp to investigate more closely. Noticing the scout's light, Sheikh Abdullah assumed the vessel belonged to Rahmah and responded with a strategic countermeasure, repositioning his fleet behind the light source to cut off Rahmah's escape to sea. This tactical movement confirmed Rahmah's suspicions and left his ships vulnerable between the shoreline and the enemy.

=== Battle ===
Rahmah ordered his fleet into open waters, led by his flagship Al-Manowar, hoping to avoid encirclement. As dawn broke and the opposing fleets became visible, Rahmah expressed hesitation about engaging the Al Khalifa directly, citing their superior strength. Ibn Ufaysan interpreted this caution as weakness and provoked him with a traditional verse meant to stir courage. Insulted, Rahmah ordered the sails raised and committed to battle.

The fighting was intense and at close range. The ship of Rashid bin Abdullah Al Khalifa collided with Rahmah's vessel, and shortly afterward, Sheikh Abdullah brought his own ship, Al-Tawila, alongside them. The combat that followed was fierce. Rashid was killed, and heavy casualties were inflicted on both sides. During the exchange, the sails of both Rahmah's and Rashid's ships caught fire from the volleys of gunfire. The two vessels were destroyed in the flames. Only Sheikh Abdullah's ship escaped the burning wreckage.

=== Aftermath ===
Rahmah, wounded severely in his right hand, managed to flee by clinging to floating debris. Ibn Ufaysan also escaped in similar fashion. According to Muḥammad ibn Kahlīfa al-Nabhānī in The Nabhani offering on the history of the Arabian Peninsula (1924), in the aftermath, Rahmah reproached Ibn Ufaysan for disregarding his earlier advice, asking whether he now understood the strength of the Utub confederation. Ibn Ufaysan, humbled by the defeat, offered no reply.

Despite killing 1,000 Bahraini and Kuwaiti soldiers, including officers Duaij bin Sabah Al Sabah and Rashid bin Abdullah bin Ahmed Al Khalifa, Ibn Jabir lost 300 troops and was forced to withdraw to defend Diriyah from Ottoman armies invading the western Hejaz from Yanbu on the Red Sea.

=== Ibn Bishr's account ===
Uthman ibn Bishr, the chief historian of the early Wahhabi movement, writes as follows in his 1853 book 'Unwan al-Majd fi Tarikh Najd ("The Name of Glory in the History of the Najd"), written around 1853 to 1854 and first published in 1873:

Some of each side's ships encountered one another at sea near Bahrain in the month of Rabiʽ al-Awwal. In the battle, more than a thousand men were killed among the people of Bahrain and their followers, including Duaij bin Sabah, the ruler of Kuwait, as well as Rashid bin Abdullah bin Hamad Al Khalifa and other nobles.

== See also ==
- List of wars involving Saudi Arabia
