= Rashid bin Fadhel Al Bin Ali =

- راشد بن فاضل آل بن علي
- Born: Rashid bin Fadhel bin Saif bin Fadel bin Mohammed bin Muqbel bin Jumah bin Saif Al Bin Ali; 1877; Al Hidd, Muharraq Island, Bahrain
- Died: 1960; Darin Island, Eastern Province, Saudi Arabia
- Occupation(s): poet, historian, sailor
- Known for: Nayla: The Path of Guidance and Collection of Virtues

Sheikh Rashid bin Fadhel bin Saif bin Fadel bin Mohammed bin Muqbel bin Jumah bin Saif Al Bin Ali (Arabic: الشيخ راشد بن فاضل بن سيف بن فاضل بن محمد بن مقبل بن جمعه بن سيف ال بن علي, born in 1877 in Al Hidd, Muharraq Island, Bahrain, died in 1960 on Darin Island, Saudi Arabia) was a Bahraini author, sailor, and poet who belonged to the Al Bin Ali dynasty of the eastern Gulf. He was born in Al Hidd and received his elementary education there before studying fiqh (Islamic jurisprudence) and linguistics with a Moroccan scholar in Medina. At the age of seventeen, he became a sea captain, and he eventually wrote the famed النايلة: مجاري الهداية (“Nayla: The Path of Guidance”), a widely consulted guide for early 20th-century sailors in the Persian Gulf. A notable poet, he was famous for his classical approach to writing history as well, including the seminal مجموع الفضائل (“Collection of Virtues”), a study of the lineage and history of the local tribes. The last-named book relied on such erudite sources as Al-ʿIqd al-Farīd, the diary of Ibn Hisham, سبائك الذهب (“Gold Bullion”), Al-Damri’s حياة الحيوان (“Life of Animals”), and Abu l-Hasan al-Bakri’s فتوح مكة (“Conquest of Mecca”).
