= Al-Sulami flag =

Heritage flag of the Al Bin Ali tribe

Al-Sulami
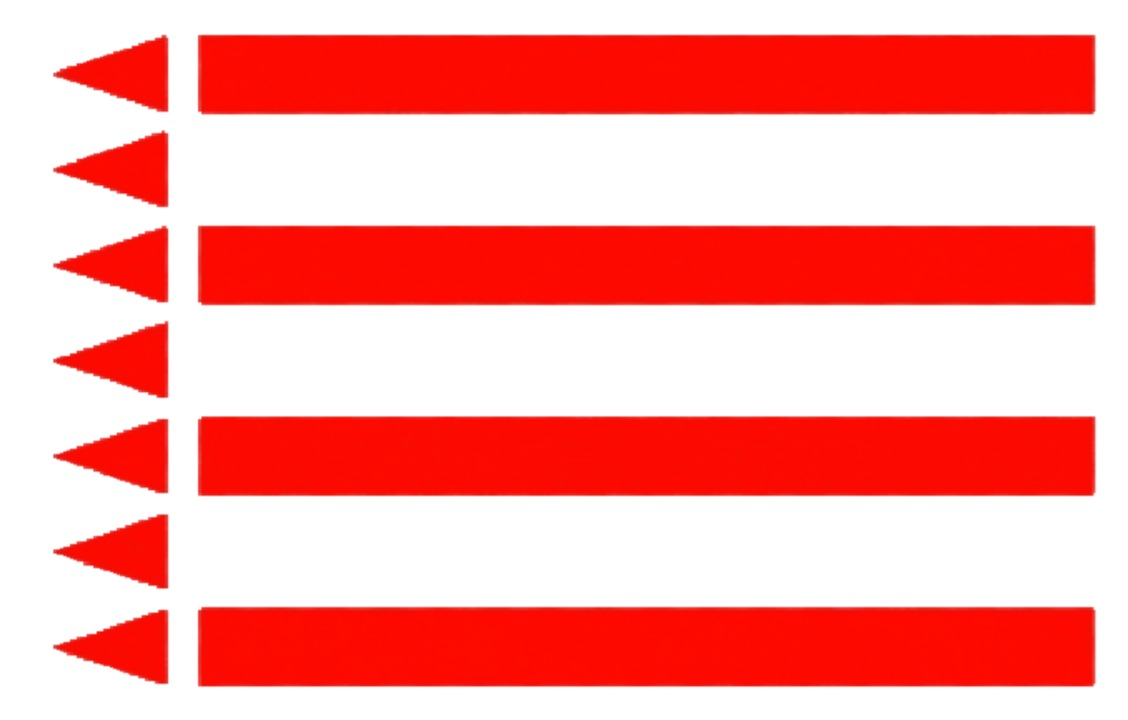
- Use: Historical
- Proportion: Unknown
- Adopted: 1794

The Al Sulaimi Flag (Arabic: العلم السليمي) was used by the Al Bin Ali tribe until the 1960s in Bahrain, Qatar, and Kuwait. It consists of four red and three white stripes with seven red triangles facing towards the west.

The current flags of Bahrain and Qatar were derived from the Al Sulami Flag. The flag was used by Al-Khalifa and Al-Sabah when they were in Kuwait in the mid eighteenth century.

== Al Bin Ali, a self-governed tribe with its own flag ==
The Al Bin Ali were a politically important group that moved between Qatar and Bahrain, they were the original dominant group of the Zubarah area.

The Al Bin Ali were known for their courage, persistence, and abundant wealth. They were also historically known to be a practically independent community in Bahrain as they were not forced to pay any sort of taxes by the rulers of Bahrain Al Khalifa, therefore they were self-governed.

The Utub Al Bin Ali carry the Al-Sulami flag as they call it in Bahrain, Qatar, and Kuwait. It is red and white and is distinguished with four red stripes with three white stripes with seven triangles facing the west. It was raised on their ships during wartime and in the pearl season and on special occasions such as weddings and during Eid and in the "Ardha of war".

== See also ==
- History of Kuwait
- Zubarah
- Bani Utbah
- History of Bahrain
- History of Qatar
- Murair
