= Al Jalahma =

Al Jalahma (Arabic: الجلاهمة) is an Arab clan, based primarily in the Arab States of the Persian Gulf. They are derived from the `Anizzah tribe of Northern Central Arabia. They were one of the four Utub clans who founded the modern state of Kuwait in 1716, along with Al Bin Ali, Al Sabah and Al Khalifa.

Rahmah Ibn Jabir Al Jalahma was a notable member of the clan.

== History ==
They were expelled from Umm Qasr by the Ottomans due to their predatory habits of preying on caravans in Basra and trading ships in Shatt al-Arab. They migrated to Kuwait thereafter. Around the 1760s, the Jalahimas, along with the Al Khalifas, migrated to Zubarah in modern-day Qatar, leaving Al Sabah as the sole proprietors of Kuwait. The two tribes established a free-trade port at Zubarah's harbor, but the Al Khalifas refused to share the economic gains with the Al Jalahmah, and so the latter migrated to Al Ruwais. The Al Khalifa went on to monopolize the pearl banks around Qatar.

Putting aside their grievances, the Utub tribes of Al Jalahma and Al Khalifa, along with some Arab tribes, drove out the Persians from Bahrain in 1783 in an expedition which was launched in part due to Persian aggression towards Zubarah in 1782. Al Jalahma seceded from the Utub alliance sometime before the Utub annexed Bahrain in 1783, and the Al Jalahma returned to Zubarah as they considered themselves treated unfairly by the Al Khalifas as they were betrayed by them. AlKhalifa did not share their political or territorial gains. This left Al Khalifa in undisputed possession of Bahrain.

The Al Jalahma tribe allied itself with the Wahhabis of Arabia, who assumed control over much of the territory encompassing the Persian Gulf. Conversely, the Al Khalifas aligned itself with the Wahhabis' main opposition; the Omanis. In 1811, Said bin Sultan of Muscat capitalized on an opportunity to attack the Wahhabi garrisons in Bahrain and Zubarah and the Al Khalifas were returned to power. The same year, Rahmah ibn Jabir al-Jalahimah fought a naval battle against the Al Khalifas, to which the result was favorable to the Al Khalifas. The heated confrontations between the Al Jalahmas and Al Khalifas came to a head when a naval battle ensued between the aforementioned in 1826, which resulted in the deaths of many, including famous captain Ahmad ibn Salman Al Khalifa, after Rahmah ibn Jabir al-Jalahimah blew up his own ship in close quarters.

== Present day ==
Even after its secession from Bani Utbah, the Al Jalahma clan is still widely regarded by many to be a part of the tribal confederation.

Members of the clan are scattered in all over the Arabian Peninsula, most Al Jalahmas are found in Kuwait, Qatar, KSA and Bahrain.
