= Isa bin Tarif =

Shaikh Isa Bin Tarif Al Bin Ali (Arabic: الشيخ عيسى بن طريف ال بن علي) (c. 1790 – 1847) was chief of Al Bidda, known today as Doha, the capital of Qatar, as well as the chief of the Al Bin Ali tribe from the beginning of the 19th century until his death in 1847. He was described by political agents in the Persian Gulf as being one of the most energetic and powerful chiefs in the Gulf region

== Biography ==
Shaikh Isa bin Hamad bin Tarif Al Bin Ali Al-Utbi was born in 1790 in Zubarah, one of the oldest historical towns in Qatar. He was the chief of the Al Bin Ali clan and a descendant of the Utub who conquered Bahrain in 1783.

== Bahraini assault on Al Huwaila ==
In 1835, the Bahraini ruler despatched troops to attack Al Huwaila, whose strength had begun to worry him. The Bahrainis landed at Zubarah, which had been abandoned since 1811 and moved to establish themselves at Fuwayrit, close to Al Huwaila. Despite being reinforced by a small number of Wahhabi horsemen and infantry, the chief of Al Huwaila sought mediation which was successful in keeping the status quo but required the desertion of Al Huwaila and the moving of its inhabitants to Bahrain. However, the Al Khalifas family induced some members of the Al Bukuwara tribe of Fuwayrit to attack Al Huwaila, killing a member of the Isa bin Tarif's family in the process. Moving to Abu Dhabi and intent on continuing his disagreement with Bahrain, Isa bin Tarif chief of Al Huwaila found himself constrained by the British, who refused to allow them to continue warfare against Bahrain. The British also brought pressure to bear on the inhabitants of Al Bidda and Al Wakrah, who were also engaged in what was considered by the British as unlawful activities.

== Conquest of Mombasa in 1837 ==
On 5 March 1837, the Al Bin Ali under the command of their leader Isa bin Tarif attacked Mombasa at the request of the Sultan of Muscat and Oman, Said bin Sultan, repeatedly bombarding Fort Jesus for a week until the Portuguese surrendered on 12 March.

== Activities in Bahrain ==
Negotiations followed between Isa bin Tarif, the British, the Sultan of Muscat and Egypt, the latter of whom wished to expand their interests in the region. Isa bin Tarif wanted to return to al-Huwaylah or Al-Bida along with certain guarantees of protection from the British. In the event he asked, and was given permission, to move to Wakra which had been deserted by the al Bu ’Ainain. This failed to come about and, following more negotiations with the British, Isa bin Tarif settled on the Persian island of Qais in 1840 where he was considered to be no threat to the stability of the region.

In 1843, Shaikh Isa Bin Tarif was one of the men who assisted Shaikh Mohamed Bin Khalifa to overthrow the Ruler of Bahrain who was Shaikh Mohamed's great uncle Shaikh Abdulla Bin Ahmed Al Khalifa whom was also Shaikh Isa Bin Tarif's enemy.

== Ruling the Qatar Peninsula ==
After helping Shaikh Mohamed oust Shaikh Abdulla from the rulership of Bahrain in 1843, Shaikh Isa Bin Tarif and his tribe Al Bin Ali moved to the town of Al-Bida (known today as Doha) and re-established it after the removal of the Al-Sudan Tribe from it. In Al-Bida, Shaikh Isa Bin Tarif built a wall to the sea from both the east and west.

=== 1847 Battle of Umm Suwaya and his death ===
The ruler of Bahrain, Mohammed bin Khalifa frequently visited the town of Fuwayrit and interfered with its affairs. In 1847, Isa became convinced that Mohammed wanted to bring the nearby town of Zubarah under his control to prevent future attacks on Bahrain from being launched from the coast of Qatar.

The deposed ruler of Bahrain, Abdullah bin Ahmed bin Khalifa, lived in Qatar during this period. After garnering support from the Wahhabis of Najd, he threatened to occupy Bahrain. Isa pledged allegiance to Abdullah and offered to assist him. In November Mohammed bin Khalifa wrote a letter to Captain William Lowe of the East India Company's naval squadron. Lowe responded to the letter by requesting Mohammed to refrain from hostilities at sea, and warned that any vessels found being used for war would be seized. Mohammed retorted by blaming Isa and Abdullah for creating a warlike atmosphere. On 7 November 1847, Isa and his deputy jointly wrote to Samuel Hennell describing their suspicions of Mohammed's plan to invade the north-east coast of Qatar.

Intent on defending the coast from Bahraini intervention, Isa and Mubarak bin Ahmed arrived in Fuwayrit with 400 troops in the first week of November. Mohammed retorted by sending 7 small ships and 20 battils and advancing towards Fuwayrit by way of Zubarah. As the tensions worsened, the British dispatched several naval ships to blockade Al-Bida and wrote warning letters to Isa, Abdullah and Mohammed. Shortly after, Ali bin Khalifa landed on the coast of Al Khor with 500 Bahraini troops under his command. The Bahraini forces were accompanied by the governors of Al-Hasa and Qatif. The forces of Isa and Mubarak bin Ahmed numbered 600 troops.

The decisive battle took place on 17 November near Fuwayrit. Isa's forces were defeated after he and eighty of his men were killed. After proclaiming victory, Mohammed sent his warships to attack and demolish Al-Bida, and relocated most of its inhabitants to Bahrain.
