= Al Bin Ali =

Sunni Arab sub-tribal confederation based in the Arab states

Al Bin Ali (Arabic: آل بن علي) is a Sunni Arab sub-tribal confederation based in the Arab states, especially Bahrain, Qatar, Kuwait, the UAE, and the Eastern Province of Saudi Arabia.

The Al bin Ali Al Utbi Tribe is a descendant of the original Utub tribe which conquered Bahrain. The vast majority of members of the Al Bin Ali clan stem either from the Bani Sulaim or Al-Maadeed tribes.

They had a strong positive economic effect on Persian Gulf nations such as Bahrain and Qatar. Many textbooks and poems were written about Al Bin Ali Tribe. Their castles and ships are historical landmarks. The Al Bin Ali had practically independent status in Bahrain and Qatar as a self-governing tribe. They used a flag with four red and three white stripes with seven triangles facing the west, called the Al-Sulami flag in Bahrain, Qatar, Kuwait, and the Eastern Province of Saudi Arabia.

== Bahrain ==
The Al Bin Ali family are related by marriage to the royal family of Bahrain. The tribe left Bahrain with its strong economic force to Qatar. The Ruler of Bahrain requested the Al Bin Ali tribe to return to Bahrain to their castles and property.

J. G. Lorimer noted in his publication Gazetteer of the Persian Gulf that the tribe owned upwards of 500 houses in Bahrain, and were mainly concentrated in Muharraq and Al Hidd.

Evidence in historical texts and maps indicate over 1,500 years ago the Al Bin Ali tribe originated from the center of Arabia – Najd, currently known as Riyadh.

On 17 May 1783, war broke out between The Al Bin Ali Bani Utbah tribe and the army of Nasr Al-Madhkur. Zubarah was originally the center of power of the Al Bin Ali Bani Utbah tribe, which ruled Zubarah and are the original dominant tribe in Zubarah. About 2,000 Persian troops arrived in Bahrain by December and attacked Zubarah on 17 May 1783. After suffering a defeat, the Persians withdrew their arms and retreated to their ships. An Utub naval fleet from Kuwait arrived in Bahrain the same day and set Manama ablaze. The Persian forces returned to the mainland to recruit troops for another attack, but their garrisons in Bahrain were ultimately overrun by the Utub.

The strategist of this battle was Shaikh Nasr Al-Madhkur; his sword fell into the hands of Salama Bin Saif Al Bin Ali after his army collapsed and his forces were defeated.

The Al Bin Ali have kept the sword with them and passed it from son to grandson until it was given as a gift to King Abdul Aziz Bin Faisal Al Saud and is currently in the King AbdulAziz Museum in Riyadh.

The original Utub Al Bin Ali conquered and expelled the Persians from Bahrain after defeating them in the battle of Zubarah in 1782 between the Al Bin Ali and the Army of Nasr Al-Madhkur, ruler of Bahrain and Bushire. The Bani Utbah was already present at Bahrain at that time, settling there during summer and purchasing date palm gardens.

== Conquest of Mombasa in 1837 ==
On 5 March 1837, the Al Bin Ali under the command of their leader Isa bin Tarif attacked Mombasa. Said bin Sultan, Sultan of Muscat and Oman helped the tribe with ships and armoury, repeatedly bombarding Fort Jesus for a week until the Portuguese surrendered on 12 March. The fort was ruled by the Portuguese Empire, with Kenyan and Portuguese soldiers.

== Qatar ==
Sheikh Isa bin Hamad bin Tarif Al Bin Ali was a member of the Al Bin Ali family. He was the chief of Al Bidda (known today as Doha) the capital of Qatar, as well as the chief of the Al Bin Ali tribe from the beginning of the 19th century until his death in 1847. He was described by political agents in the Persian Gulf as being one of the most energetic and powerful chiefs in the Persian Gulf region.

The Al Bin Ali settled at Zubarah in 1732, founded and ruled the town of Zubarah and its port, making it one of the most important port and pearl trading centers in the Persian Gulf in the 18th century. They also expanded their settlements, and constructed walls and a fort outside the town of Zubarah called Qal'at Murair (Murair Castle), the name is derived from a water spring in the Bani Sulaim area next to Madina Al Munawara in today's Saudi Arabia also known as Herat Bani Sulaim.

According to a population estimate in 1904, there were 1,750 members of Al Bin Ali tribe in Qatar, most of whom were concentrated in Doha.
