= Al Bidda Tower =

Office building in Doha Corniche, Qatar

- Interactive map of the Al Bidda Tower area

General information
- Status: Completed
- Type: Commercial offices
- Location: Doha Corniche, Qatar
- Coordinates: 25°18′58.35″N 51°31′33.24″E
- Construction started: 2006
- Completed: 2009
- Owner: Swissboring Qatar WLL

Height
- Architectural: 196.6 metres (645 ft)
- Antenna spire: 215 m (705 ft)

Technical details
- Material: Concrete / steel / glass
- Floor count: 43

Design and construction
- Architect: GHD Group

Al Bidda Tower is a 43-storey commercial office building on the Doha Corniche in Al Dafna, Qatar. The building is 196.6 metres (645 ft) (215 m (705 ft) by antenna spire) tall and has 43 floors. Construction begun in 2006 and completed in 2009. The tower includes commercial space, business centres, showrooms, restaurants, art gallery, outdoor café and health club and a parking lot with a capacity for 1,000 with direct underground access to the tower.
