= Bani Utbah =

Arabian tribe originally from Najd

Bani Utbah بَنِيّ عُتبَة
- Ethnicity: Arab
- Location: Eastern Arabia
- Branches: Al Khalifa; Al Sabah; Al Bin Ali; Al Jalahmah
- Language: Arabic (Gulf)
- Religion: Sunni Islam

Map of the Arabian Peninsula in 600 AD, showing the various Arab tribes and their areas of settlement. The Lakhmids (yellow) formed an Arab monarchy as clients of the Sasanian Empire, while the Ghassanids (red) formed an Arab monarchy as clients of the Roman Empire A map published by the British academic Harold Dixon during World War I, showing the presence of the Arab tribes in West Asia, 1914

The Bani Utbah (Arabic: بَنِيّ عُتبَة, romanized: banī ‘utbah, plural Utub; Arabic: الْعُتُوب al-‘utūb, singular Utbi; Arabic: الْعُتبِيّ al-‘utbī) is an Arab tribal confederation in the Arabian Peninsula. The confederation is thought to have been formed when a group of clans from Najd migrated to Eastern Arabia in the late 17th century and early 18th century. Most of the Utub clans and families, such as the Al-Sabah and Al-Khalifa, trace their lineage back to the Anizah tribe, with the exception of some, such as the Al Bin Ali, whose lineage goes back to the Banu Sulaym tribe. The Al Bin Ali along with the current ruling families of Bahrain and Kuwait were the rulers of the federation. The name of the confederation is found in the form Attoobee or Uttoobee in English sources up to the late 19th century.

== History ==
=== Invasion of Oman (1697) ===
The Shia Iranian Safavids asked for the assistance of the Utub in invading Oman in 1697; however, they were defeated, as they were already engaged in another war with the Ottomans for the control of Basra. Some Utub and Huwala at that time were serving as mariners in the Persian navy, but they revolted due to maltreatment and took possession of some ships and sailed away.

=== Omani invasion of Bahrain (1717) ===
The Imam of Oman at the time, Sultan bin Saif II, asked for the assistance of the Utub in invading Bahrain in 1717. The Utub assisted him and he successfully took Bahrain, Qishm and other Islands near the Persian coast from the Safavids.

=== Bani Utbah invasion of Bahrain (1783) ===
The Bani Utbah led many clans along with Ahmed bin Muhammad bin Khalifa and Salama bin Saif Al Bin Ali invaded and conquered Bahrain in 1783. Bahrain has been ruled by the Bani Utbah House of Khalifa ever since.

On 17 May 1783, war broke out between the Al Bin Ali clan and the army of Nasr Al-Madhkur. Zubarah was originally the center of power of the Al Bin Ali Bani Utbah clan, which ruled Zubarah and are the original dominant clan in Zubarah. About 2,000 Persian troops arrived in Bahrain by December; they then attacked Zubarah on 17 May 1783. After suffering a defeat, the Persians withdrew their arms and retreated to their ships. An Utub naval fleet from Kuwait arrived in Bahrain the same day and set Manama ablaze. The Persian forces returned to the mainland to recruit troops for another attack, but their garrisons in Bahrain were ultimately overrun by the Utub.

Shaikh Nasr Al-Madhkur was the strategist of the battle; his sword fell into the hands of Salama Bin Saif Al Bin Ali after his army collapsed and his forces were defeated.

The Utub under the leadership of Shaikh Ahmad bin Mohammed Al Khalifa and his subjects in Zubarah, Qatar, conquered and expelled the Persians from Bahrain in 1782 after defeating them in the battle of Zubarah between the people of Zubarah and the Army of Nasr Al-Madhkur. The Bani Utbah were already present at Bahrain at that time, settling there during summer season and purchasing date palm gardens.

=== Battle of Khakeekera (1811) ===
In 1811, the confederation was involved in a battle against Rahmah ibn Jabir al-Jalhami, who was preparing to invade Bahrain via Al Khuwayr, Qatar in the service of the Emirate of Diriyah. The battle ended in a victory for the Utub.

=== Conquest of Mombasa (1837) ===
On 5 March 1837, the Al Bin Ali under the command of their leader Isa bin Tarif attacked Mombasa. the Sultan of Muscat and Oman, Said bin Sultan helped the Ali Bin Ali with ships and armoury, repeatedly bombarding Fort Jesus for a week until the Portuguese surrendered on 12 March. The fort had been ruled by the Portuguese Empire, with East African and Portuguese soldiers.^{[4]}

== Migration ==
The Utub's ancestral homeland is in central Arabia, particularly the Najd region. During a prolonged drought in the 17th century, the Utub clans migrated from their homeland, traveling through Al Aflaj, Qatif, and Al Ahsa and eventually reaching Freiha in northwestern Qatar.

They established Freiha as a fortified coastal hub with access to maritime trade routes and pearling waters. After successive military skirmishes with the dominant Al Musallam tribe, who were under nominal Ottoman support, they departed for Iraq near Basra in 1716. They were expelled from Umm Qasr in Iraq by the Ottomans shortly thereafter due to their habits of preying on caravans in Basra and trading ships in Shatt al-Arab.

Following their expulsion, they migrated to Kuwait and established a government under the Al-Sabah family. Around the 1760s, the Al Jalahma and Al Khalifa clans, both belonging to the Utub federation, migrated to Zubarah in modern-day Qatar, near Freiha, leaving Al Sabah as the sole proprietors of Kuwait. The two clans established a free-trade port at Zubarah's harbor, but the Al Khalifas refused to share the economic gains with the Al Jalahmah, and so the latter migrated to Al Ruwais. The Al Khalifa went on to monopolize the pearl banks around Qatar.

Putting aside their grievances, the Utub clans of Al Bin Ali, Al Jalahma and Al Khalifa, along with some Arab clans, drove out the Persians from Bahrain in 1783 in an expedition which was launched in part due to Persian aggression towards Zubarah in 1782.

== See also ==
- Huwala
