= Nasr Al-Madhkur =

18th-century Arab governor

Sheikh Nasr Al-Madhkur (Arabic: الشيخ نصر آل مذكور) was the 18th-century Arab governor from a Huwala clan under Karim Khan Zand of the Zand dynasty of what was described by a contemporary account as an "independent state" in Bushehr and Bahrain. The account by German geographer Carsten Niebuhr who visited the region at the time describes Sheikh Nasr as "the sole Monarch of the Isle of Bahrain”. A “mutashayi’” (convert to Shi’ism, as described by Sheikh Sultan bin Muhammad Al-Qasimi), Sheikh Nasr lost Bahrain - which was inhabited by his Shi’a compatriots - in 1783 after his defeat by the Bani Utbah tribal alliance at Zubarah in 1782.

The Al-Madhkur family was regarded as an Omani Arab clan and led the Bushehr province on the Persian Gulf littoral. According to Carsten Niebuhr, the 18th-century German geographer, the Abu Shahr Arabs under the Al Madhkurs were one of three major Arab forces ruling parts of southern Persia in the 1760s. Although the Abu Shahr Arabs lived on the Persian Gulf littoral they should not be confused with Huwalas, and did not share their sense of identity, at least according to Niebuhr. Niebuhr visited Bushire in 1765, and when he wrote of independent Arab states, he included Bushire.

== Reign ==
=== Rise to Power ===
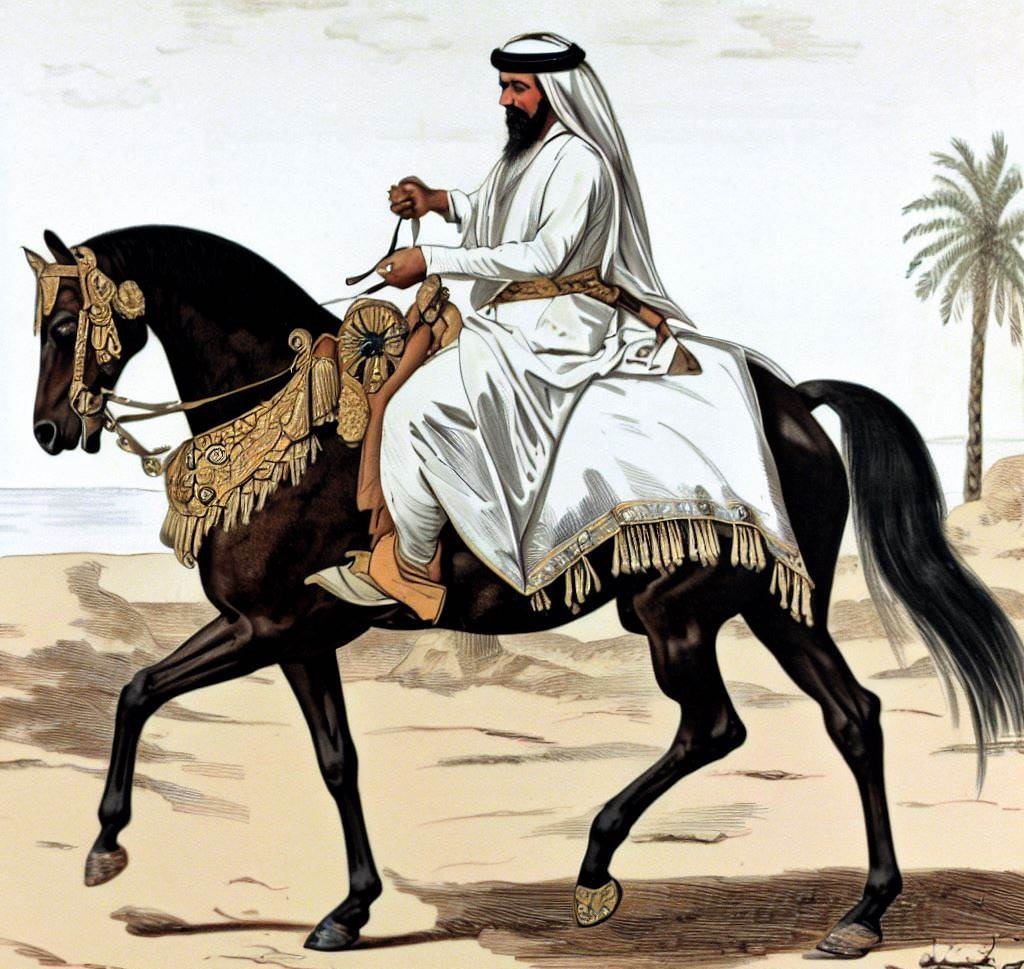
Sheikh Nasr Al-Madhkur in Bushehr

After the death of Nader Shah in 1747, Sheikh Nasr was able to use this power vacuum to imprison the shahbandar of Bushehr and establish control over the city by the end of 1748. At first, he stayed out of the battles between the various Afsharid contenders, but by January 1751 he declared independence and imprisoned tax collectors sent by Ismail III, as well as forming ties with the tribes of Dashtestan.

==== Gaining Bahrain ====
Sheikh Nasr, gaining confidence in his abilities, invaded Bahrain (an island which was controlled by the sheikh of Asalu) in the second half of 1751 with the help of the similarly named Mir Naser of Bandar Rig. However, they were driven back by September and forced to retreat. The sheikh of Asalu then besieged Bushehr in November with the help of the other Huwala Arabs, but the attack was ineffective and were soon forced to lift the siege. The Bandar Rig-Bushehr alliance eventually did manage to take over Bahrain, but the ruler of Bandar Rig convinced Nasr to return to Bushehr and give the island to him. However, in 1753 an attack from Bandar Ganaveh forced Mir Naser to return to Bandar Rig, allowing Nasr Al-Madhkur to take the island. During the conflict over Bahrain, the island itself had been badly undermined by the chaos. It appears that Al-Madhkur used Bahrain as a place to send those suffering from leprosy and venereal disease.

==== Conflict with Bandar Rig ====
Sheikh Nasr still felt angry with Bandar Rig, not only because of the takeover of Bushehr but because the Dutch left Bushehr for Khark Island, forming a prosperous trading location and allowing Bandar Rig to thrive. Sheikh Nasr then supported Mir Naser's younger brother, Mir Muhanna, when he unsuccessfully tried to take Bandar Rig in December 1754.

The prosperity and emerging position of Zubarah as a flourishing pearling centre and trading port, now in modern Qatar, had brought it to the attention of the two main regional powers at that time, Persia and Oman, which were presumably sympathetic to Sheikh Nasr's ambitions. Zubarah offered great potential wealth because of the extensive pearls found in its waters.

== Siege of Zubarah 1783 ==
A quarrel arose in 1782 between the inhabitants of Zubarah and Persian-ruled Bahrain. Zubarah natives traveled to Bahrain to buy some wood, but an altercation broke out and in the chaos an Utub sheikh's slave was killed. The Utub and other Arab clans retaliated on 9 September by plundering and destroying Manama. A battle was also fought on land between the Persians and the Arab clans, in which both sides suffered casualties. The Zubarans returned to the mainland after three days with a seized Persian gallivat that had been used to collect annual treaty. On 1 October, Ali Murad Khan ordered the sheikh of Bahrain to prepare a counter-attack against Zubarah and sent him reinforcements from the Persian mainland.

== Bani Utbah's victory over Nasr Al-Madhkur at Zubarah in 1783 ==
On 17 May 1783, war broke out between the Zubarah-based Al Bin Ali Bani Utbah clan and the army of Nasr Al-Madhkur. Zubarah was originally the center of power of the Al Bin Ali Bani Utbah clan, which was ruling Zubarah and the original dominant clan in Zubarah. About 2,000 Persian troops arrived in Bahrain by December; they then attacked Zubarah on 17 May 1783. After suffering a defeat, the Persians withdrew their arms and retreated to their ships. A Kuwaiti naval fleet arrived in Bahrain the same day and set Manama ablaze. The Persian forces returned to the mainland to recruit troops for another attack, but their garrisons in Bahrain were ultimately overrun by the Utub.

The strategist of this battle was Shaikh Nasr Al-Madhkur, his sword fell into the hands of Salama Bin Saif Al Bin Ali after his army collapsed and his forces were defeated.

The Al Bin Ali, have kept the sword with them and they kept passing it from son to grandson until it was given as a gift to King Abdul Aziz Bin Faisal Al Saud and it can be seen today at the King AbdulAziz Museum in Riyadh, Capital of Saudi Arabia

The Original Utub Al Bin Ali conquered and expelled the Persians from Bahrain after defeating them in the battle of Zubarah that took place in the year 1782 between the Al Bin Ali and the Army of Nasr Al-Madhkur Ruler of Bahrain and Bushire. The Bani Utbah was already present at Bahrain at that time, settling there during summer season and purchasing date palm gardens.
