= Bani Utbah invasion of Bahrain =

1782–83 war ending Persian rule

Date	1782–1783
Location	Bahrain
Result	Bani Utbah victory: Al Khalifa annexes Bahrain into its sheikhdom

Belligerents
al-Madhkur's realm	(Bahrain) Sheikhdom of Zubarah; Sheikhdom of Kuwait: Utubs and other allied tribes of Zubarah; Supported by: Al-Dhafeer

Commanders and leaders
Nasr Al-Madhkur; Madan Al-Jidhafsi †; Sayed Majed Al-Jidhafsi (MIA)	(Bahrain) Ahmad Al Khalifa; Abdullah I Al-Sabah

Casualties and losses
Heavy	Unknown

The Bani Utbah invasion of Bahrain led to the end of Persian rule in Bahrain and the annexation of Bahrain by the Al Khalifa clan of the Bani Utbah.

== Background ==
After the fall of the Safavid dynasty, Bahrain went through a period of anarchy, dismay, and self-rule in villages which made the country vulnerable to foreign invasions. Utub forces often attacked the island during this period, which made the spiritual leader of Bahrain, Sheikh Mohammed ibn Abdullah Al Majed, use the Huwala to combat the Utub attacks. These attacks continued throughout the early 18th century until the Utub launched a full-scale invasion of the island and established a government loyal to the Imam of Oman. The Utub were defeated and expelled by the Huwala forces loyal to Bahrain's spiritual leader who established a government headed by Sheikh Jabara Al-Holi (also known as Jubayr al-Holi). The Persian Afsharids led by former Safavid general Nader Shah invaded the island in 1737 and deposed Sheikh Jabara. Persian rule continued for 46 more years, with brief interruptions, until the Utub finally took over the island in 1783.

== Civil war and invasion ==
Sayid Majed ibn Sayid Ahmad Al-Jidhafsi was Bahrain's vice governor and the headman of Jidhafs who often clashed with his political rival, Ahmad ibn Muhammad Al-Biladi, the headman of the semi-autonomous village of Bilad Al-Qadeem, which translates as the old country or the old land.

In 1782, a servant of the Al Khalifa family named Salem arrived on the island of Sitra from Zubarah on the Qatari mainland to purchase palm trunk, ropes, and other materials. While there, he and his companions were attacked by local residents; Salem was killed, several others were wounded, and their belongings were looted. Survivors returned to Zubarah, prompting outrage among its leaders. Sheikh Ahmad bin Muhammad Al Khalifa, angered by the killing of his retainer, sent a formal protest to Nasr Al-Madhkur, the Persian-appointed ruler of Bahrain and Bushehr. When Nasr failed to respond with seriousness, the Al Khalifa used the incident as justification for retaliation.

With the support of fellow Bani Utbah tribes, they launched an assault on Bahrain on 9 September 1782, plundering and destroying the town of Manama. A brief land battle ensued between the Arab tribes and Persian defenders, in which both sides suffered casualties. The people of Zubarah returned to the mainland after three days with a seized Persian gallivat that had been used to collect the annual treaty. On 1 October, the Persian governor of Shiraz, Ali Murad Khan, ordered Nasr Al-Madhkur to launch a full-scale counterattack against Zubarah and sent him reinforcements from the Persian mainland. Approximately 2,000 Persian troops were dispatched, and by December 1782, they began preparations for a landing on the Qatari coast.

In May 1783, Nasr's fleet arrived off the coast of Qatar and began disembarking at Ras Ushayriq near Zubarah. Due to low tide, the ships were forced to anchor offshore while the army advanced overland. Zubarah was besieged for nearly a month. Mediation efforts by Rashid bin Matar, the former ruler of Julphar (present-day Ras Al Khaimah), led to negotiations in which the Utub offered to return the goods and ships previously seized from Persian ports such as Bandar Rig and from Bahrain. However, Nasr Al-Madhkur rejected the proposal and pressed ahead with his campaign.

On a Friday in December 1783, Persian forces landed between Zubarah and Freiha and launched a final assault. They were repelled in a decisive battle by a coalition of local Qatari tribes, which included the Al-Maadeed of Freiha. Sheikh Muhammad bin Khalifa, the nephew of Nasr Al-Madhkur, was killed in combat along with many of his soldiers. The Persian army was routed, and its remnants fled the battlefield.

Al-Madhkur then headed to Iran to ask the troubled government, which was already suffering from internal issues, for help which did not arrive due to Iran's problems. Subsequently, Sayid Majed Al-Jidhafsi, who was substituting for Al-Madhkur, personally asked the Al Khalifas and their allies to invade the Bahrain archipelago and promised them material aid and victory, should they do so. This action proved to have a lasting effect on the county and started a civil war between the loyalist forces led by Sayid Majid Al-Jidhafsi and Madan Al-Jidhafsi, the Iranian governor's vizier and the rebels led by Ahmad Al-Biladi. The loyalists ultimately won the civil war.

After the invasion, Sheikh Ahmed bin Muhammad bin Khalifa assumed control of the island, expelling the Persians and installing a governor on his behalf. His primary residence, however, remained in Zubarah, while a garrison was established in Qal'at Ad-Diwan, located south of present-day Manama. The invasion led to Ahmed bin Muhammad Al Khalifa being nicknamed Ahmed Al Fateh ("Ahmed the Conqueror").

== See also ==
- Abdullah I Al-Sabah
- History of Bahrain (1783–1971)
- List of Sunni dynasties
- Qatari–Bahraini War
