= List of Bahranis =

The Baharna are one of the many East Arabian groups. The following is a list of notable Bahrani figures.

== Academics ==
- Ali Al-Ahmed, Bahraini political activist, public speaker, scholar, writer
- Abdulhadi Khalaf, Bahraini leftist political activist and academic

== Actors ==
- Ali Al-Sebaa, Saudi television actor
- Sabrin Burshid, actress

== Artists ==
- Abdullah Al Muharraqi, Bahraini artist considered the founder of modern art in the Persian Gulf region
- Sara Qaed, Bahraini political cartoonist

== Bloggers ==
- Ali Abdulemam, Bahraini blogger and contributor to Global Voices
- Mahmood Al-Yousif, Bahrani blogger and political activist

== Businesspeople ==
- Amin H. Nasser, CEO of Saudi Arabian oil company Saudi Aramco
- Nadhmi Al-Nasr, CEO of NEOM
- Mahdi Al Tajir, businessman from the United Arab Emirates, based in the United Kingdom
- Yara Salman, Bahraini businesswomen who introduced cryotherapy to the country

== Journalists ==
- Mansoor Al-Jamri, son of Bahrain's spiritual leader, Sheikh Abdul-Amir Al-Jamri
- Leila Al Mutawa (born 1987), novelist and journalist

== Musicians ==
- Mohammed Haddad, composer and music critic
- Majeed Marhoon, saxophonist and a former Leftist political activist with the National Liberation Front of Bahrain
- Majid Al-Maskati, singer of the Canadian R&B duo Majid Jordan

== Philosophers ==
- Kamal al-Deen Maitham al-Bahrani, famous 13th century philosopher

== Poets and writers ==
- Ebrahim Al-Arrayedh, one of the greatest poets of Bahrain and the Persian Gulf region
- Thuraya Al Arrayedh, daughter of Ebrahim Al-Arrayedh
- Ali Al Jallawi, poet, researcher, and writer
- Ayat Al-Qurmezi, poet
- Mohammed Hasan Kamaluddin, Bahraini former minister, poet, ex-diplomat, historian, writer, and researcher

== Politicians ==
- Masouma Abdelrahim, Bahraini politician sworn into the 2018 Council of Representatives; head of drug and alcohol unit at the Ministry of Health
- Majeed Al Alawi, Bahrain's Minister of Labour Affairs
- Jawad Al-Arrayedh, Bahrain's first Shia Deputy Prime Minister
- Nazar Al Baharna, Minister of State for Foreign Affairs of Bahrain
- Massouma al-Mubarak, Kuwait's first female minister
- Hussain Al-Qallaf Al-Bahrani, member of the Kuwaiti National Assembly
- Nada Haffadh, Bahrain's first ever female cabinet minister when she was appointed Minister of Health
- Ali Salman, secretary general of Al Wefaq, Bahrain's biggest opposition party.
- Hussain Al Baharna, Minister of State for Legal Affairs in Bahrain
- Isa bin Abdulrahman Al Hammadi, Minister of Information Affairs

== Activists ==
- Abdul Amir al-Jamri, spiritual leader of the Bahrani people
- Isa Qassim, spiritual leader of Al Wefaq, Bahrain's biggest opposition society; leader and founder of the Islamic Awareness Institution
- Abdulhadi Al Khawaja, Bahraini human rights activist and hunger striker
- Nimr al-Nimr, spiritual leader of the 2011 Saudi Arabian protests
- Hasan Mushaima, Bahraini political activist
- Nabeel Rajab, Bahraini human rights activist
- Abdulwahid AlAbduljabbar, Saudi political activist

== Rebels ==
- Abu al-Bahlul al-Awwam, member of the Abdul Qays tribe who deposed the Qarmatians in Bahrain
- Sayyid Shubar al-Sitri, attempted a coup d'état in 1895, however it failed due to lack of support from Shi'a clerics
- Abdullah bin Ali Al Uyuni, rebel against the Qarmatians in the Overthrowing of the Qarmatians

== Religious figures ==
=== Grand Ayatollahs ===
- Shaykh Ahmad, founder of the Shaykhí school of thought
- Maitham Al Bahrani, renowned 13th-century Shi'a cleric and theologian
- Yusuf Al Bahrani, renowned 18th-century Shi'a cleric
- Alaaeldeen Alghurayfi, Iraqi Shi'a Marja
- Salih Al-Karzakani, renowned 17th-century Shi'a cleric
- Abdullah al Samahiji, renowned 18th-century Shi'a cleric

=== Ayatollahs ===
- Yasser Al-Habib controversial Kuwaiti ayatollah

== Sports ==
- Ismael Abdullatif, Bahraini football player
- Sayed Mohamed Adnan, Bahraini football player
- Hamad Al Fardan, Bahraini racing driver
- Tareq Al-Farsani, Bahraini bodybuilder
- Husain Ali, Bahraini football player
- Hussein Taher Al-Sabee, Saudi long jumper
- Hussein Al-Sadiq, Bahraini football player
- Jamal Al-Saffar, Saudi sprinter
- Abbas Ayyad, Bahraini football player
- A'ala Hubail, Bahraini football player
- Mohamed Hubail, Bahraini football player
- Sayed Mohammed Jaffer, Bahraini football player
- Abbas Ahmed Khamis, Bahraini football player
- Hussain Salman, Bahraini football player

== Others ==
- Tekken Master (Sayed Hashem Ahmed), professional esports player
