= Mariam Hussein =

Moroccan actress (born 1988)

Mariam Hussein Oueidat
- مريم حسين عويدات
- Born: September 16, 1988 (age 37); Tétouan, Morocco
- Occupation: Actress
- Years active: 2009–present
- Spouse: Saudi Faisal Al-Faisal
- Children: Amira

Mariam Hussein Oueidat (Arabic: مريم حسين عويدات, born September 16, 1988) is an Iraqi–Moroccan actress, living in the UAE.

== Early life ==
Mariam was born in the Moroccan city of Tétouan; born to an Iraqi father and Moroccan mother. In 2009, She started acting through her participation in The Neighbors. She continued her artistic work after that. The Maid marked her true beginning. In 2011, she started singing, and presented her first single, "Men Shefteh".

== Personal life ==
In May 2016, she married the Saudi Faisal Al-Faisal, but their marriage did not last long, and they separated in December of the same year. In February 2017, she gave birth to her daughter, Amira.

== Career ==
In 2012, she started presenting programs. Her first program was the competition program, "Every Day Maryoum", which was shown on Al-Youm Channel, and was criticized by the audience on the pretext that she was pretending to be intrusive and intruding on Emirati nationality. In 2013, she presented the second season of it. She was chosen as Miss Gulf of Actresses in 2016.

=== Television series ===
Year of production	Series name	Share
2009	Neighbors	Ahmed Al Jasmi, Abdul Mohsen Al-Nimr, Fatima Al Hosani, Hind Al Balushi, Habib Ghuloom
2010	Love Leaves	Laila Al-Salman, Saif Al-Ghanim, Shehab Gohar, Maysa Maghribi, Suad Ali
2010	Eid Night	Hayat Al-Fahd, Ghanim Al-Saleh, Ahmed Al-Jasmi, Qahtan Al-Qahtani, Salma Salem
2010	Ayam al-Faraj	Ghanim Al-Saleh, Asmahan Tawfiq, Basma Hamada, Khaled Amin, Khaled Al-Buraiki
2011	Sugar Nabat Girls	Asmahan Tawfiq, Zina Karam, Amal Al-Awadi, Abdul-Imam Abdullah, Salma Salem
2011	Ghshmshm – Part 6	Fahad Al Hayyan
2011	The Maid	Khaled Al-Harbi, Badria Ahmed, Muhammad Al-Hajji, Sana Bakr Younis, Rashid Al-Shamrani
2011	The Marriage – Part Two	Mohammed Al-Serafy
2012	Darb Al-Wafa	Nayef Al-Rashed, Asmahan Tawfeeq, Mishary Al-Balam, Heba Al-Dari, Shahid, Abdullah Bahman
2013	Awal As-Sahh	Suleiman Al-Yassin, Basma Hamada, Khaled Al-Buraiki, Lamia Tariq
2013	Sabaya 5	Jenny Esper, Lilia al-Atrash
2013	Perfume of Paradise	Asmahan Tawfiq, Zahra Arafat, Haya Abdel Salam, Abdullah Boushahri, Mahmoud Boushahri
2013	owner of my heart	Ahmed Al-Saleh, Ahmed Musaed, Lamia Tariq, Shatha Hassoun, Fayez Al-Saeed, Hussain Al-Mahdi
2014	Papers from the Past	Abdulaziz Jassim, Zahra al-Kharji, Basma Hamada, Nasir Muhammad, Hussein al-Mahdi, Abdullah Abdul Aziz, Mohammed Marwa
2014	Khali Wasl	Tariq Al-Ali, Hassan Hosny, Amal Abbass, Said Salem, Fatima Koshary, May Abdullah,
2016	The Big House	Hassan Asiri, Dima Bayaa
2018	Cold Summer	Shaila Sabt, Nermin Mohsen, Fatima Al Hosani

=== Theatre ===
Year of production	Play name	Share
2011	Tartangi	Tariq Al-Ali, Daoud Hussein, Amal Abbas
2012	Doha's Good Talent	Jassim Al-Ansari, Nasir Muhammad, Amal Al Awadi, Maggi Mutran

=== Cinema ===
Year of production	Movie name	Share
2019	Dirhams	Alaa Shaker, Abdullah bin Haider, Huda Al-Ghanim, Ahmed Al-Omari, and Lubna Al-Hassan.

== Awards ==
- 2010: Winner of the Best Promising Actress Award from "Jordan's First Festival of Arab Media" for her role in the series Eid Night.
- 2012: Winner of the Best Gulf Actress Award from the "Distinguished in Ramadan Festival" for her role in the series Darb Al-Wafa.
