= Ahmed Al-Taan =

- أحمد آل طعان
- Born: Ahmed bin Saleh bin Taan bin Nasser bin Ali al-Sattari al-Bahrani al-Qatifi; 1835; Markouban, Sitra, Bahrain
- Died: February 23, 1898 (aged 62–63); Al-Qudaih, Qatif, Saudi Arabia
- Resting place: Maitham Al Bahrani Mosque, Mahooz, Bahrain
- Occupations: poet, Shia scholar

Sheikh Ahmed bin Saleh bin Taan bin Nasser bin Ali al-Sattari al-Bahrani al-Qatifi (Arabic: الشيخ أحمد بن صالح بن طعَّان بن ناصر بن علي الستري البحراني القطيفي, born in 1835 in Markouban, Sitra, Bahrain, died in 1898 in Al-Qudaih, Qatif, Saudi Arabia) was a Bahraini cleric, jurist, and Shia Muslim authority, who was among the most influential Twelver Shiites of the early modern Gulf. Many Shiites in Bahrain and Qatif followed his fatwas, but he is also known for his compilations on fiqh (Islamic jurisprudence), hadith, history, and poetry.

== Early life and education ==
Born in the village of Markouban on the island of Sitra in 1835, Al-Taan moved with his father to Manama, where he studied grammar, morphology, logic, etc. at a Shia hawza (madrasa) with Ibn Ishaq Al-Baladi for nearly two years.

== Migration to Najaf ==
Al-Taan immigrated to Najaf to complete his religious studies in the late 1860s or early 1870s due to his father's poor financial condition. His first father-in-law funded his travels, so he moved to Najaf where he worked for a time with a group of ulema (clerics).

== Migration to Qatif ==
After a while, he returned to Bahrain and stayed there another two years, until he traveled to Iraq once again to visit Shiite holy sites with his family. Hearing an appeal by Mohammed bin Khalifa, the then-ruler, to capture the island from Mohammed's brother Ali, Al-Taan considered the idea of joining a few Bedouins there to form a raiding party. He ultimately decided not to go and settled near Qatif, specifically in the town of Saihat. The mayor there summoned someone who was beaten to death, in protest of which Al-Taan's family moved to al-Dababiyya, where he was visited by a delegation from Al-Qudaih, including Mayor Ibrahim ibn Ali Abu Al-Raha, inviting him to settle there.

He settled for the remainder of his life in Qatif. However, he left for a trip to Mashhad (a key Twelver pilgrimage site where Ali al-Ridha was buried) and several visits to Bahrain.

== Mentors ==
- Ali bin Muhammad bin Ishaq Al-Baladi Al-Bahrani, his first hawza teacher in Bahrain
- Abdullah bin Abbas Al-Sitri Al-Bahrani
- Murtadha al-Ansari (“The Great Sheikh”)
- Muhammad Hussain Al-Kazemi
- Radhi bin Muhammad bin Muhsin al-Najafi

== Work ==
In praise of Caliph Ali:

قالوا إمدحن أمير النحل قلت لهم... مدحي له موجب نقصاً لمعناه

لأن مدحي له فرع بمعرفتي... بذاته وهي سر صانه الله

فإن أصفه بأوصاف الأناس أكن... مقصرا إذ جميع الخلق أشباه

وإن أزد فوق هذا الوصف خفت بأن... أتيه مثل غلاة فيه قد تاهوا

فدع مديحي ومدح الناس كلهم... والزم مديحا له الرحمن أولاه

فكل من رام مدحا فيه منحصر... لسانه عن يسير من مزاياه

They said to praise the Amir al Nahl [“Prince of Bees”, a metaphor for believers], but I said to them...that praising him loses all meaning Because my praise is from my wisdom...and thus the secret of Allah's keeping If I describe him in human terms, I would be...negligent, since all creation is akin And if I go beyond such concepts, I fear that...I have exaggerated and strayed from him So let my praise and that of all people...serve to praise him, the Most Merciful

Since whoever speaks in His praise...holds a tongue unworthy of his due.

His compilation of lyric poetry by Abu Firas al-Hamdani includes the following original:

الحق نور عليه للهدى علم... من أمه مستنيرا قاده العلم

يا حبذا عترة بدئ الوجود بهم... وهكذا بهم ينهى ويختتم

من مثلهم ورسول الله فاتحهم... وسيطة العقد والمهدي ختمهم

وهل أمية لا أمت بمغفرة... ولا نحت سوحها من رحمة ديم

تنوش هدب ذيول للهدى سدلت... من الالاه لها الأملاك تحترم

ولا كمثل بني العباس لأرقبوا... الا ولا ذمة بل رحمهم جذموا

جنوا بمثل الذي تجني أمية بل... على طنابيرهم زادت لهم نغم

Truth is the light that guides knowledge...for those who follow the mother of wisdom Oh it is good from the beginning of one's existence...and through its end To be like them who Muhammad...and the Mahdi has reached in word And the unreached dies neither forgiven...nor saved by the mercy of sihr Sealed with tantosh, the hem of the gift...to God, such talismans are neither respected Nor, like the Abbasids watched over...with an oath but mercy is denounced

And they reap the same as the illiterate [of God's word], but...their drums beat louder.

His lament for Al-Ansari is another example:

لله سهم سددته يد القضا... فأصاب كل الخلق حتى من مضى

عقدت عليه المكرمات نطاقها... فالآن حق لعقدها ان ينقضا

تالله ان المرتضى قد شب في... قلب الورى لما مضى نار الغضا

وسقى ضريح المرتضى صوب الرضا... ما نور مفخره على الدنيا أضا

God's arrow was fired by the judge...and he afflicted all creation, even before He ruled his domain...now the right of his contract has expired Of Allah, Murtada had flourished...in the heart of consciousness when the fire of youth had passed

And the watering of Murtada's shrine to his joy...is the light of his pride in this world

An ode to infaq (charitable giving outside of the mandatory tithe or zakat) goes as follows:

يا فاعل الخير والإحسان مجتهدا... أنفق ولا تخش من ذي العرش إقتارا

فالله يجزيك أضعافا مضاعفة... والرزق يأتيك أمثالا وأبكارا

O doers of good and diligent philanthropy...spend and do not fear the throne of despair

God will reward you exponentially...and riches will come to you in variety and in plentitude [sic]

== Death ==
Al-Zirikli wrote that Al-Taan died in Bahrain on the night of February 23, 1898:

His funeral and burial were attended by great scholars, rulers, and other dignitaries, closing the market for seven days amid great mourning in Bahrain, Qatif, Bandar Lengeh, Najaf, and other cities in the region, with more than 150 ceremonies held in all. Nothing like it had been seen in his lifetime.

== Publications ==
- زاد المجتهدين في شرح بلغة المحدثين (“Great Endeavor to Explain ‘The Language of Speakers’,” a scholarly commentary on this humanities text by Suleiman Al-Mahoozi)
- رسالة في الحبوة (“A Message of Love”)
- قرة العين في حكم الجهر بالسملة والتسبيح في الأخيرتين (“The Joy of Speaking Out Loud in Praise the Last Two Ra’akah [of a prayer]”)
- شرح اللمعة (“Exegesis of the Al-Lum’ah,” a commentary on Al-Lum'ah Ad-Dimashqiyah [The Damascene Glow] by Muhammad Jamaluddin al-Makki al-Amili)
- سلم الوصول إلى الأصول (“The Ladder to the Fundamentals”)
- إزالة السجف عن موانع الصرف (“Removing Distracting Obstacles to Rhetoric,” a grammar treatise)
- إقامة البرهان على حلية الأربيان (“Proof of the Shrimp Charm”)
- منهاج السلامة (“The Approach to Security”)
- ملاذ العباد في أحكام التقليد والاجتهاد (“Sanctuary of Servants in the Provision of Tradition and Diligence”)
- الدرر الفكرية في أجوبة المسائل الشُبَّرية (“Pearls of Wisdom to Answer Youthful Problems,” answering four questions sent to him by Shubar al-Sitri)
- التحفة الأحمدية للحضرة الجعفرية (“The Ahmadiyya contributions to Ja’fari jurisprudence)
- قبسة العجلان في وفاة غريب خراسان (“Qabsat al-Ajlan in the Death of Gharib Khurasan,” a study written when, on his return from Hajj and a visit to Medina, he was indisposed in Jeddah the day before the anniversary of Ali al-Ridha’s martyrdom and asked by his companions to write a hagiography; he covered the Shiite narrative on his virtuous humility and sacrifice and wrote poetry to supplement, creating a reference routinely used by imams in Qatif, Bahrain, Basra, and Bandar Lengeh on his death day)
- الديوان الأحمدي (“The Ahmadi Diwan,” a poetry collection)
- الرسالة العاشورية (“The Message of Ashura”)
- البديعة الفريدة في مدح الأمير وأبنائه الكرام (“The Unique Innovation in Praising the Prince and His Esteemed Children”)

== Students ==
- Hassan bin Ali bin Asfour Bahrani
- Baqir bin Ali bin Ishaq al-Bahrani
- Mohammed bin Abdullah bin Ahmed Al-Bahrani
- Dhaif Allah bin Muhammad bin Ahmed bin Saif Al-Qatifi
- Sheikh Ali Al-Biladi, son-in-law of Al-Taan and author of Anwar al-Badrayn (“The Light of the Two Moons”, a compilation of works by scholars from Qatif, Al-Ahsa, and Bahrain; he immigrated with his father from Bahrain to Qatif at an early age due to political conditions at home, taking hawza classes with Al-Taan
- Muhammad Salih Al-Taan, Ahmed's son, described in Anwar al-Badrayn as writing works including “an explanation of his father’s notions of doubts and forgiveness, and a high-quality book on fiqh.”
