= Al-Arrayed =

Al-Arrayed or al-Orrayed is an Arabic-language surname. Notable people with the surname include:

- Abdul Karim Al-Orrayed (1934–2025), Bahraini artist
- Ebrahim Al-Arrayedh (1908–2002), Bahraini poet and writer
- Jawad Al Arrayed (born 1941), Bahraini lawyer
- Thuraya AlArrayed (born 1948), Arabic-language Saudi poet and writer
