= Anti-Black racism in the Arab world =

Anti-Black racism in the Arab world refers to prejudice and discrimination against Black people in Arab societies. It affects both Black citizens of Arab countries and migrants from sub-Saharan Africa, and has been documented in employment, education, public life, migration, and popular media. It can include racial slurs, social exclusion, segregation, and stereotyped portrayals such as blackface.

The history of anti-Black racism in the region has been associated with slavery and the trans-Saharan, Red Sea, and Indian Ocean slave trades, although racial attitudes and identities have varied across periods and societies. In the modern Arab world, discrimination against Black people has been reported in countries including Tunisia, Libya, Egypt, Algeria, Mauritania, Iraq, Yemen, and Sudan. Some countries have adopted laws against racial discrimination, including Tunisia in 2018, but legal protections and public recognition of anti-Black racism vary across the region.

== History ==
Medieval Arab attitudes to Black people varied over time and individual attitude. Though the Qur'an expresses no racial prejudice, Bernard Lewis argues that ethnocentric prejudice later developed among Arabs, for a variety of reasons: their extensive conquests and slave trade; the influence of Aristotelian ideas regarding slavery, which some Muslim philosophers directed towards Zanj and the influence of Judeo-Christian ideas regarding divisions among humankind. On the other hand, the Afro-Arab author Al-Jahiz, himself having a Zanj grandfather, wrote a book entitled Superiority of the Blacks to the Whites, and explained why the Zanj were black in terms of environmental determinism in the "On the Zanj" chapter of The Essays. By the 14th century, a significant number of slaves came from either West or Central Africa; Lewis argues that this led to the likes of Egyptian historian Al-Abshibi (1388–1446) writing that "[i]t is said that when the [black] slave is sated, he fornicates, when he is hungry, he steals."

According to Wesleyan University professor Abdelmajid Hannoum, French Orientalists projected racist and colonialist views of the 19th century into their translations of medieval Arabic writings, including those of Ibn Khaldun. This resulted in the translated texts racializing Arabs and Berber people, when no such distinction was made in the originals. James E. Lindsay argues that the concept of an Arab identity itself did not exist until modern times, though others like Robert Hoyland have argued that a common sense of Arab identity already existed by the 9th century.

== Forms ==
=== Ethnic cleansing ===
In Sudan, including the southern Sudan, Nuba Mountains and the Blue Nile region, from 1955 to 2005, it is estimated that many Black people were killed or ethnically cleansed. During the First and Second Sudanese Civil War, about 2.5 – 3.5 million people were killed in attacks widely regarded as racially motivated against Black indigenous Africans.

=== Slavery ===
Although slavery was officially abolished in 1981 (codified in 2007), a 2012 CNN report suggested that 10% to 20% of the Mauritanian population was enslaved with a correlation with skin color – darker-skinned Mauritanians were often enslaved by lighter-skinned.

=== Apartheid ===
In Sudan, Beginning in 1991, elders of the Zaghawa people of Sudan complained that they were victims of an intensifying Arab apartheid campaign. Vukoni Lupa Lasaga has accused the Sudanese government of "deftly manipulat(ing) Arab solidarity" to carry out policies of apartheid and ethnic cleansing against non-Arabs in Darfur. Alan Dershowitz has pointed to Sudan as an example of a government that deserves the appellation "apartheid", and former Canadian Minister of Justice Irwin Cotler has also criticized Sudan in similar terms.

In Mauritania, according to Holly Burkhalter of Human Rights Watch, in a statement made in testimony before the Congress of the United States, "It is fair to say that the Mauritanian government practices undeclared apartheid and severely discriminates on the basis of race."

=== Discrimination and verbal abuse ===
Some of the persecuted victims of racism and discrimination in the Arab world include: Sub-Saharan Africans in Egypt, including on Eritreans, and oppressing Darfurian refugees, Algeria, Mauritania – fighting off racist policies in these countries, in Iraq where Black people face racism, Al-Akhdam in Yemen, as well as slaves who fight the stigma of their status as 'slaves' in impoverished Yemen.

In Algeria, victims of racism include Sub-Saharan immigrants who suffer daily from verbal attacks and other forms of discrimination. Many Sub-Saharan immigrants find themselves on the street due to lack of public resources. The homeless immigrants often quote the Quran in an effort to appeal to the country's Muslim unity and divert attention from their race. On the world stage the country has declared that members of its national football team must undergo a stricter selection process if they possess dual citizenship to ensure their loyalty to the country.

In Egypt, Nubian Egyptian President Anwar Sadat faced insults of not looking "Egyptian enough" and "Nasser's black poodle". Egyptian Nubian soccer player Shikabala stopped playing football for some time due to racist taunts by rival Egyptian fans during a game. A group shouted out "Shikabala" while pointing at a black dog wearing the team's football shirt. Mona Eltahawy, an Egyptian journalist, found a deep-seated anti-Black racism in her country, mainly against Sudanese, Nubian, and other darker-skinned people.

Racism has been documented in Libya, including the 2000 anti-African racist violence. They have reported facing racism in the country, with one witness reporting being called a "slave" and "animal." From the start of Libyan Civil War in 2011, Black people were massacred for their skin color according to an Amnesty International report.

=== Use of blackface ===
Blackface was frequently used in Arab comedy series in the 1980s and 1990s for characters portraying Africans, particularly Chadian, Sudanese and Mauritanian men. Historically, blackface in Arab media can be traced back to the legacy of the trans-Saharan slave trade, which has left enduring racial hierarchies in the region. Eve Troutt Powell, a professor of Arab history, notes that the cultural impact of this slave trade is intrinsically linked to the presence of blackface in Arab entertainment.

The use of blackface continued into the 21st century in many Arab series and programs. Saudi actors Nasser al-Qasabi and Abdullah al-Sadhan appeared numerous times in blackface playing Sudanese men. During that period, this tradition did not arouse any criticism and was accepted by the Arab people with some ease. However, it started to garner mass criticism and public anger, especially after most of them devoted the use of blackface to reinforcing stereotypes about Sudanese people, such as laziness and stupidity. This is particularly highlighted in Al Jazeera English's report, "Blackface: The Ugliness of Racism in Arab Media," which delves into the prevalence of blackface in Arab entertainment, examining its historical roots and contemporary implications.

In modern times, blackface has appeared in various television programs and comedy sketches across the Arab world. For instance, the Egyptian TV series Azmi we Ashgan (among many other Egyptian shows) featured actors, including Samir Ghanem and his daughter Amy, in blackface portraying Black characters with exaggerated stereotypes. Similarly, the Kuwaiti comedy show Block Ghashmara aired an episode where actors donned blackface to depict Sudanese individuals, leading to public outcry and subsequent apologies from the actors involved. Moreover, the Yemeni comedy show Cappuccino featured actors in blackface, leading to calls to cancel the show. Most of these shows are aired during Ramadan month, as broadcasters compete to promote new comedy shows, leading to the month being dubbed blackface celebration month.

During the Black Lives Matter protests, Iraqi-Moroccan actress Mariam Hussein, Lebanese singer Tania Saleh, and Algerian singer Souhila Ben Lachhab appeared in blackface in solidarity with protest. The move was described as "tasteless" and "tone deaf and blatantly offensive".

In 2022, Lebanese singer Nancy Ajram wore blackface during a comedy sketch. Egyptian singer Boshra, Kuwaiti makeup artist Ghadeer Sultan, and Lebanese singer Myriam Fares also donned blackface.

== Denial and minimisation ==
Black Arabs are excluded from major institutions in Arab-majority societies and are largely invisible. Anti-Blackness in the Arab world has long been denied but began to be addressed more openly by critics like Nader Kadhim. Efforts to raise awareness, through writing, lectures, and translation, are often met with rejection, accusations of cultural betrayal, and concern that such discussions damage the image of Arabs. Publicly addressing anti-Blackness risks professional and personal consequences, including exclusion from intellectual circles and political targeting. Despite this, the author continues this work, recognising both its urgency and the tension between cultural pride and accountability.

Denial and minimisation of anti-Black racism in the Arab world persist due to a combination of historical, cultural, and societal factors. Surveys indicate that while racial discrimination is perceived as a problem in various Arab countries, discussions around anti-Black racism are often limited. Non-Black Arabs often deny or deflect conversations about anti-Black racism using phrases like "I don't see colour". Anti-Black racism in Arab societies includes blackface, racial slurs, and exploitation of Black workers. Many remain silent or engage only superficially, especially on social media, sometimes out of concern for appearance. Movements like Black Lives Matter have prompted limited regional reflection, but systemic and cultural racism persists. Nubians in Egypt face marginalisation and state repression.

Kadhem points to a tendency of self-deception in Arab societies, where people reject racism publicly while maintaining exclusionary practices. Interracial relationships remain rare and often unacknowledged, and Black history in the region is widely ignored. National identity is prioritised over racial awareness, creating a colour-blind framework that denies past and present racism. This fragility blocks open conversation, preserves privilege, and impedes solidarity with Black liberation movements, and acts as a defensive reactions to discussions on race, such as denial, anger, or appeals to colour-blindness. In Arab societies, light-skinned individuals frequently respond to racism discussions by referencing Islamic equality, personal morality, or nationalist unity, which deflects accountability.

Incidents of discrimination may go unreported or unaddressed, and victims often choose to ignore the incidents rather than report them. In countries like Morocco, the legacy of the trans-Saharan slave trade has left enduring impacts. Terms such as "abd" (slave) and "khadem" (servant) are still used colloquially to refer to Black individuals. Despite the offensive nature of these terms, their continued use indicates a societal reluctance to acknowledge and address underlying racism.

Arab media has often portrayed Black individuals through stereotypical and derogatory lenses. Practices like blackface in television and theater, as well as the depiction of Black characters in subordinate or comedic roles, have normalized negative stereotypes. Such representations contribute to the minimization of anti-Black racism by embedding it within cultural norms.

Political figures have, at times, made statements that downplay or deny the existence of anti-Black racism. For instance, Tunisian President Kais Saied denied accusations of stoking racism following his comments targeting sub-Saharan African migrants. Additionally, Al-Jazeera's critical coverage of the Darfur crisis led to the arrest and conviction of its Khartoum bureau chief. The Darfur conflict has been characterized by racially motivated violence, with reports indicating that Arab militias, known as Janjaweed, targeted non-Arab ethnic groups, leading to allegations of ethnic cleansing and genocide.

== See also ==
- Abeed – Arabic word meaning "slave"
- Ajam – Arabic word for non-Arabs
- Kafala system – System used to monitor migrant laborers in Arab countries
