= Sabrin =

Sabrin (Arabic: صابرين) is a feminine given name and surname of Arabic origin, as well as a Romanian masculine given name. It may refer to:

== People ==
=== Given name ===
- Sabrin Burshid (1985–2019), Bahraini actress and broadcaster
- Sabrin Saka Meem, Bangladeshi actress and broadcaster
- Sabrin Sburlea (born 1989), Romanian footballer

=== Surname ===
- Murray Sabrin (born 1946), American economist
- Sarika Sabrin (born 1992), Bangladeshi actress and model

== Places ==
- Sabrin Shanqeeti market, Omdurman, Sudan

== See also ==
- Sabreen
- Sabrina
