= Dompet Dhuafa =

Indonesian charity

- Abbreviation: DD
- Established: 2 July 1993; 33 years ago
- Founder: Republika
- Founded at: Jakarta, Indonesia
- Type: Zakat and waqf management
- Award: Ramon Magsaysay Award (2016)
- Website: www.dompetdhuafa.org/en/

Dompet Dhuafa, formerly Dompet Dhuafa Republika, is an Indonesia-based international charity that focuses on the collection and distribution of zakat (alms) and management of waqf (endowments). Established in 1993 by journalists with the newspaper Republika, Dompet Dhuafa grew into one of the largest charities in Indonesia. Unlike many zakat-based charities, aid is provided not through handouts but through the promotion of economic empowerment; other programmes include healthcare, community development, and education. For its charitable activities, Dompet Dhuafa received the Ramon Magsaysay Award in 2016; it has also received multiple awards from the government of Indonesia.

== History ==
In Indonesia, charitable donations and assets bequeathed in accordance with Islamic guidelines (i.e., zakat [alms], infaq [voluntary contributions], and waqf [endowments]) may be handled by government or non-government institutions. Historically, many such charitable collections were ad hoc establishments that operated only in the final days of Ramadan. Most handled small amounts, and mismanagement of finances was commonplace.

Dompet Dhuafa ("wallet for the poor") was established on 2 July 1993 by the newspaper Republika, based on discussions by four journalists: editor Parni Hadi, as well as Haidar Bagir, Sinansari Ecip, and Eri Sudewo. Inspired by food shortages in the Gunung Kidul region of Yogyakarta, the organization was intended to fulfil social obligations to the poor. To achieve this goal, an amount equivalent to approximately 2.5% of wages was collected from Republika employees and journalists. Voluntary contributions were also sought from readers through a column published in the newspaper.

By the end of 1993, Dompet Dhuafa had collected Rp 88 million in contributions from readers, in addition to Rp 2 million per month in contributions from employees. For transparency, reports were published regularly in Republika, showing the consolidation and distribution of funds. As contributions grew, Republika established a charitable foundation to facilitate the management of these funds. In 1994, the Dompet Dhuafa Republika Foundation was granted recognition by the Ministry of Religious Affairs.

In 1999, Dompet Dhuafa expanded the scope of its charitable activities to deal with waqf. Although it began to handle such assets, its primary focus remained zakat. In 2001, Dompet Dhuafa was recognized by the Ministry of Religious Affairs as a national waqf organization. The amount of waqf bequeathed to the organization increased, reaching Rp 822 million in 2002 and Rp 2.2 billion in 2006. On 14 July 2005, Dompet Dhuafa announced the establishment of the Tabung Wakaf Indonesia (Indonesian Waqf Fund), tasked exclusively with developing waqf assets.

Dompet Dhuafa won the Ramon Magsaysay Award in 2016, by which point it operated independently of the Republika newspaper. In its citation, the Ramon Magsaysay Award Foundation described the organization as "redefining the landscape of zakat-based philanthropy in Indonesia, unleashing the potential of the Islamic faith to uplift, irrespective of their creed, the lives of millions." The organization has also received numerous awards from the government of Indonesia, including for its contributions to healthcare and the achievement of the Sustainable Development Goals.

In 2019, Dompet Dhuafa consisted of 31 branches in Indonesia as well as five outside the country, including in Hong Kong, Australia, and the United States. It reported having raised Rp 426 billion (US$25.2 million) in 2025, reaching 3.6 million beneficiaries and disbursing some Rp 400 billion in charity. The waqf endowment amounted to Rp 256.5 billion, with a 1.84% return on investment. As of 2021, Dompet Dhuafa is the largest zakat organization in Indonesia, and one of the country's largest philanthropic organizations. As of 2026, Parni Hadi is the chair of the board of trustees, with Rahmad Riyadi chairing the supervisory board, Amin Suma the sharia board, and Ahmad Juwaini the main board.

== Programmes ==
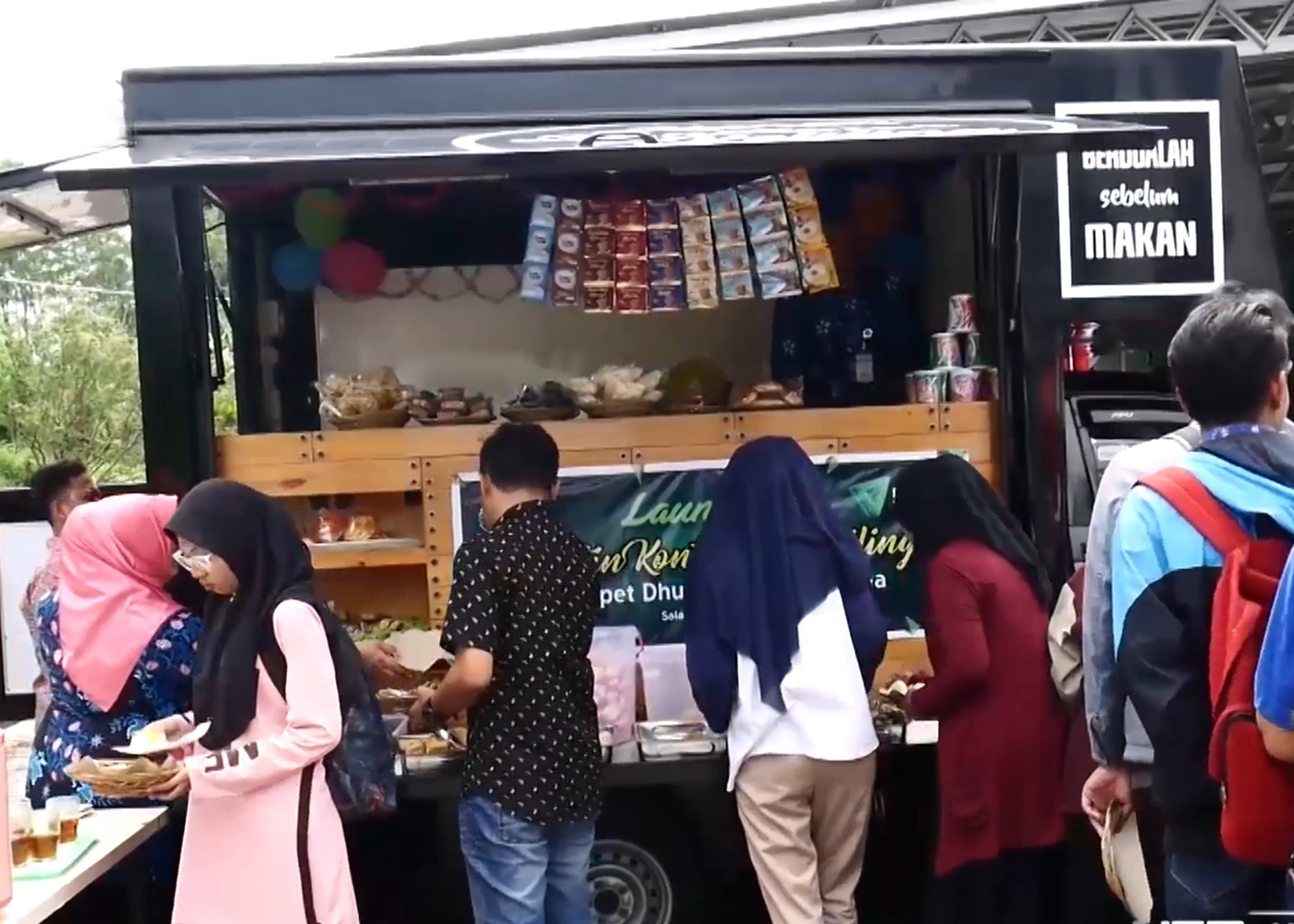
A Dompet Dhuafa mobile canteen in Salatiga, Central Java

Waqf donated to Dompet Dhuafa is handled through the Indonesian Waqf Fund. Dompet Dhuafa accepts waqf in various forms, including property and crops, as well as gold, silver, vehicles, and intellectual rights. The most common form of waqf bequeathed to the organization, however, is cash, which may be donated directly or through sharia banks. Contributors are provided a certificate in recognition of their bequests. Funds generated through the investment of waqf may be used for benefitting individuals, promoting social development, or improving community harmony.

Much of the focus of Dompet Dhuafa is economic empowerment, with the organization holding that the poor can best escape poverty not through traditional handouts but rather through grants, loans, training, and mentoring. Economic development is promoted through investment groups known as Baitul Mal wat Tamwil. Meanwhile, financial support is provided to orphans, which in 2013 represented the largest percentage of charitable spending, as well as victims of disasters. At the same time, Dompet Dhuafa has established several educational programmes, beginning with the Lembaga Pengembangan Insani (Personal Development Institution) in 2003. Since then, it has expanded its programmes to include scholarships, teacher education, and entrepreneurship training.

Dompet Dhuafa has been involved in numerous humanitarian missions. In East Java, for example, the organization has supported small and medium enterprises, promoted healthy agriculture, and funded education. It has established numerous free clinics, with one in the Ciputat district of Tangerang, West Java, having treated more than 500,000 patients between 2001 and 2012; free health checks are similarly provided throughout Indonesia. In realizing these programmes, Dompet Dhuafa works extensively with local stakeholders.

Dompet Dhuafa has also facilitated religious activities, distributing sacrificial animals to Muslims for Eid al-Adha beginning in 1994, providing funding for the refurbishment of musallah (prayer spaces), offering spiritual guidance, and facilitating funerary activities. It has facilitated other zakat organizations by providing training and helping them professionalize their programmes. Funds may be donated by non-Muslims, and non-Muslims may use Dompet Dhuafa programmes.

== Works cited ==
- Candra, Hari; Rahman, Asmak Ab (2010). "Waqf Investment: A Case Study of Dompet Dhuafa Republika, Indonesia". Shariah Journal. 18 (1): 163–190.
- "Dompet Dhuafa". Ramon Magsaysay Award Foundation. 2016. Archived from the original on 7 March 2026.
- "Dompet Dhuafa Raises $25.2 Million in 2025". The Jakarta Globe. 15 January 2026. Archived from the original on 7 March 2026.
- Jayasooria, Denison (2021). "Grassroots Economies, Empowering Local Communities: Case Studies from Three ASEAN Countries". In Kim, Euiyoung; Miura, Hiroki (eds.). Social Economy in Asia: Realities and Perspectives. Bloomsbury Publishing USA. pp. 71–90. ISBN 978-1-9787-7265-6.
- Mulyadi, Mohammad (2012). "Organisasi Masyarakat (Ormas) Dompet Dhuafa dalam Perspektif Pemberdayaan Masyarakat" [The Dompet Dhuafa Social Organization from a Social Empowerment Perspective]. Aspirasi (in Indonesian). 3 (2): 167–178. Archived from the original on 16 November 2024.
- Nurdin, Ali (2013). "Transformasi Dompet Dhuafa dari Lembaga Amil Zakat Menjadi Lembaga Sosial-Kemanusiaan" [Transformation of Dompet Dhuafa from a Zakat Charity Institution into a Socio-Humanitarian Institution]. Al-Turāṡ (in Indonesian). 19 (2): 345–368.
- "Organization Structure". Dompet Dhuafa. 13 September 2022. Archived from the original on 7 March 2026.
- Putri, Annisa; Pambudi, Bayu Prasetyo; Aldiansyah, Septianto; Ristrianti, Yusniar Rah Ayu (2024). "Strategy of Dompet Dhuafa in Empowering Poor Communities in East Java Province". Journal of Geographical Sciences and Education. 2 (2): 52–60. doi:10.69606/geography.v2i2.96.
- Sahroni, Abdullah; Mardiah, Siti; Litriani, Erdah (2025). "Do the Islamic Social Finance Institution Programs Realize the Sustainable Development Goals (SDGS)? Analysis of Dompet Dhuafa Program". Journal of Islamic Economics and Finance Studies. 6: 154–170. doi:10.47700/jiefes.v6i1.10988.
- Simanjuntak, Tertiani ZB (29 July 2016). "Dompet Dhuafa Takes Lead in Indonesian Philanthropy". The Jakarta Post. Archived from the original on 7 March 2026.
