= Shaila (band) =

- Origin: Buenos Aires, Argentina
- Genres: Rock, punk rock, melodic hardcore
- Years active: 1994-present
- Label: SPE Discos
- Members: Joaquín Guillén, Pablo Coniglio, Santiago Tórtora, Yasser, Guido Diez

Shaoila is an Argentine melodic hardcore/punk rock band from Buenos Aires, Argentina. Formed in 1994, they played for two years for the fun of it and released their first EP, titled Sólo Un Día Más (Just One More Day) in 1996.

Shaila is one of the most important bands of the genre in South America. They have played with bands such as Lagwagon, MxPx, The Ataris and NOFX. Besides Argentina, they have also played in Chile, Uruguay and Peru.

Their Punk rock influences have been noticed since their beginning, in the different shows through Die Shule, Remember, Continuará, Teatro del plata, Rock & Blues, between others.

== Solo un día más ==
Their first self-production was edited in the end of 1996: Solo un día más was a cassette that contained four songs. That year the band participated in many other compilations.

Santiago joined the band in 1999 as a second guitar. Now, the sound is more powerful for their second production: Shaila, which allows them to reach farther areas like Uruguay, Mar Del Plata and the whole Buenos Aires province.

== Progresar ==
Alejo (the previous drummer) quits the band in 2000 and Guido comes to replace him on drums. With him they record their first LP called Progresar, that includes thirteen melodic hardcore songs. This album marks a new era for the band, when the sound becomes more neat and the melodies become more mature.

== El Engaño ==
In 2002 they edited El Engaño, their second LP, which received very good critics by the press and this can be seen through the disc sales. They were invited to the "Festival AntiGlobalización" with El Otro Yo, Carajo and Cadena Perpetua in the "Microestadio de Independiente", and to the two editions of the "Rock Al Parque" Fest in Avellaneda Park, in September with Arbol, Raíz and Nativo (with 3000 spectators) and in December with Raíz, Totus Toss, Smitten and Nativo (with 4000 viewers).

Mañanas (2004) was recorded between February and March 2004. It was edited by their own record company: Speed Power Emotion, it includes fourteen songs that were presented in a national tour that finished in Cemento in July. The end of that tour took place at Peteco's.

== Los Caminantes and Camino a Idilia ==
They started to record Los Caminantes, an EP for the LP Camino a Idilia in 2006. They showed this LP in July 2007 in El Teatro with Rodia, Jordan and Sudarshana, in which show they presented their video "Sudamérica II - El Fracaso Regional". On 8 September, they organised a massive festival called "Festival Contra la Violencia y Discriminación" (Festival against violence and discrimination). They got 11 bands together, something remarkable in the history of Argentinian music. These bands were Rodia, Sudarshana, Jordan, Buzzer, Inadaptados, Despierta Tu Mente, Hyntu (replacing a Da-Skate), Euforia and Esencia.

== Discography ==
- 1996 - Sólo Un Día Más (EP) (Independent)
- 1998 - Shaila (EP) (Independent)
- 2000 - Progresar (LP) (SPE Cat. Nº 004)
- 2002 - El Engaño (LP) (SPE Cat. Nº 007)
- 2003 - Congelando El Tiempo (Recompilation) (LP) (SPE Cat. Nº 008)
- 2004 - Mañanas (LP) (SPE Cat. Nº 009)
- 2006 - Los Caminantes (EP) (SPE Cat. Nº 012)
- 2006 - Camino A Idilia (LP) (SPE Cat. Nº 013)
- 2008 - Dame tu Voz (Recompilation) (LP) (SPE Cat. N° 016)
- 2009 - Nuestras Guerras (LP) (SPE Cat. N° 020)
- 2015 - Contraindicado (LP) (SPE Cat. 029)

== See also ==
- Latin American music
- Shaila Sabt, first Miss Bahrain
