= Zahra Arafat =

Bahraini actress

- زهرة عرفات
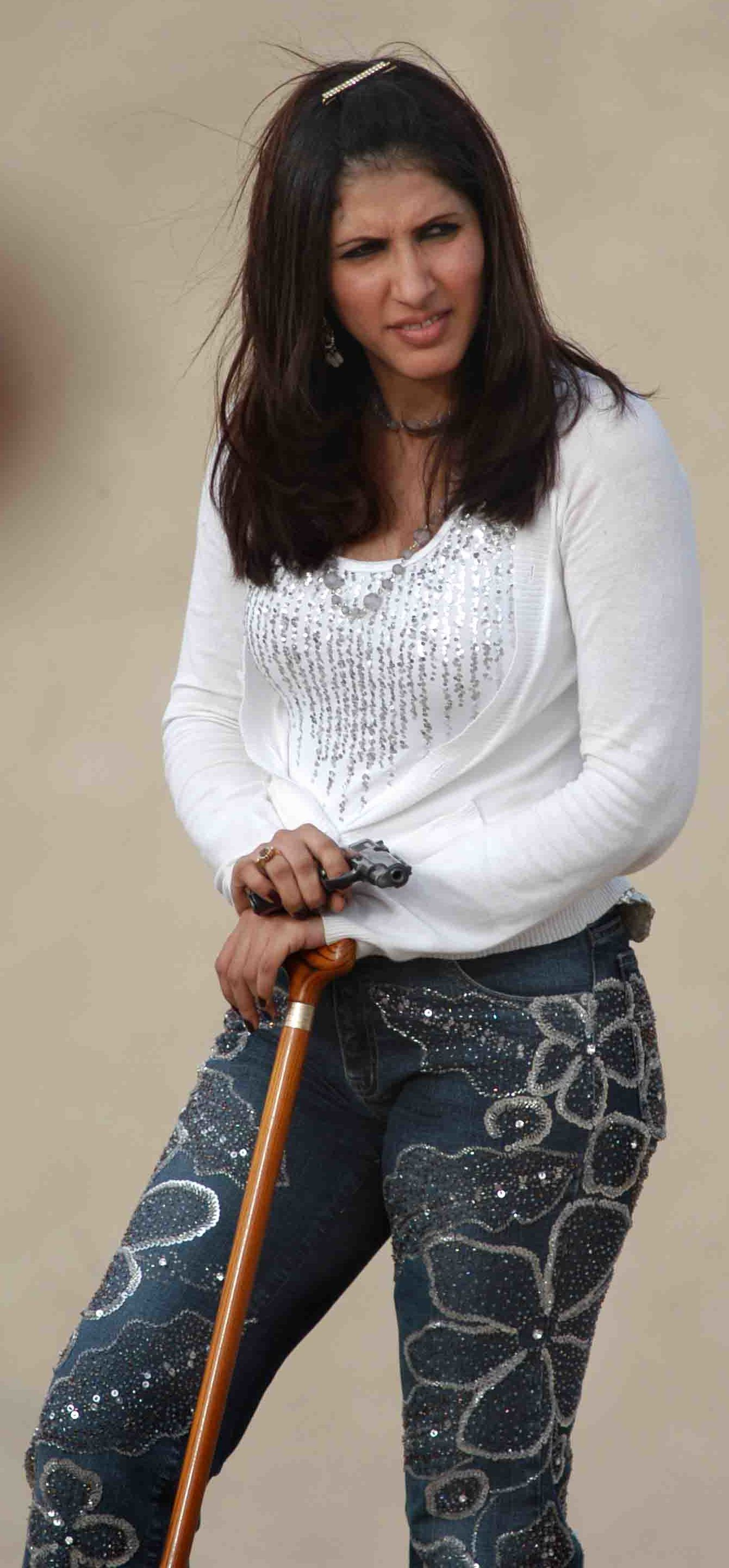
- Born: November 8, 1969 (age 56)
- Occupations: Actress, TV presenter
- Years active: 1995–Present
- Height: 166 cm (5 ft 5 in)
- Children: Wafa Mohammed Aboody

Zahra Arafat (Arabic: زهرة عرفات; born November 8, 1969), is a Bahraini actress residing in Kuwait. She settled in Kuwait in 1997, and she would begin her performing career that year co-starring with Tariq Al-Ali in I Won’t Live Under My Wife’s Mantel. Her career continued since then with appearances in many works for television and theatre throughout the Persian Gulf region.

== Career ==
=== Film ===
Filmography
| Year | Title |
|---|---|
| 2014 | From A to B |

=== Variety television co-hosting ===
TV hosting career
| Broadcaster | Show |
|---|---|
| Dubai TV | The Queen |
| LBC | Banat Hawa |
| Abu Dhabi TV | Zahrat Al Khaleej |

=== Television series ===
Filmography
| Year | Series |
|---|---|
| 1996 | عجايب زمان |
| 1997 | بحر الحكايات |
| 1997 | Al-Warith |
| 1997 | Ahlam Dayiea |
| 1999–2003 | Alkhatar Ma'hum |
| 1999 | Al Mudhi (TV series) |
| 1999 | 2000 Plays (teleplay) |
| 1999 | غنائيات (TV special) |
| 2000 | Al Ekhteyar |
| 2000 | داوديات (TV special) |
| 2000 | Khatawat Ealaa Al-Jalid |
| 2000 | Hakam Al Zaman |
| 2000 | Secrets Behind Walls |
| 2001 | Al-Qadr Al-Mahtum |
| 2001 | Who Kills Dreams |
| 2002 | أبو رش رش |
| 2002 | Café Bou Azouz |
| 2002 | I Am Free |
| 2002 | Watabaqaa Al-Judhur |
| 2002 | Game Destiny |
| 2003 | Years of Silence |
| 2003 | Yoam Akher |
| 2003 | وجه واحد لا يكفي |
| 2003 | Red Card |
| 2004 | Tash ma Tash 12 (episode “بلا أجنحة”) |
| 2004 | B'ad Alshatat |
| 2005 | Zaman’s Awakening |
| 2005 | If It’s Too Late |
| 2005 | Al-Luqita |
| 2005 | Mo'egeb's Arab Family |
| 2006 | Magadif El Amal |
| 2006 | Aswar |
| 2006 | Windows (comedy anthology) |
| 2006 | Tash ma Tash 14 (several episodes) |
| 2007 | Oh-Yamal |
| 2007 | Al Aseel |
| 2007 | Yes and No |
| 2007 | Hams Al Harayer |
| 2007 | Unreal or Not |
| 2008 | نص درزن |
| 2008 | مصدق نفسه |
| 2009 | Al-Sakinat fi Quloubuna (episode 2) |
| 2009 | Until When |
| 2009 | Big Love |
| 2009 | Ayam Al Sarab |
| 2009 | White Heart |
| 2010 | Wish Wisha |
| 2010 | Al-Beet Al-Maskoon |
| 2010 | Classifications |
| 2010 | Motlaf Alrouh |
| 2010 | Maryam's Brothers |
| 2011 | Shewayt Aml |
| 2011 | The Deadly Feeling |
| 2011 | A Person from This Time |
| 2011 | The Multigamist 2 |
| 2012 | A Woman Seeking Forgiveness |
| 2013 | Attar el Genna |
| 2013 | Al Malafea |
| 2013 | Jar Al-Qamar |
| 2013 | Ay Damaa Hozn La |
| 2013 | Samt El Bawh |
| 2013 | Al-Wajha |
| 2014 | Garh Al-Senin |
| 2014 | Rihana |
| 2014 | Ahl Eldar |
| 2015 | Menna wa Feena |
| 2016 | The Sisters-In-Law |
| 2016 | Tareeq Al Moallemat |
| 2016 | Bab Elreh |
| 2016 | Paper Dreams |
| 2017 | Kalus |
| 2017 | Tired of Pleasing You |
| 2017 | Dumue Al’Afaei |
| 2018 | Habibi Hyati |
| 2019 | Happy Day |
| 2019 | Kan Khalid |
| 2020 | Shaghaf |
| 2020 | Wa Ka'ana Shay'an Lam Yakon |
| 2020 | Al-Shahd Al-Murr |
| 2025 | Ommi |

=== Theatre ===
Theatre career
| Year | Play |
|---|---|
| 1997 | I Won’t Live Under My Wife’s Mantel |
| 1998 | حكم الحاس |
| 1999 | Bou Mteih |
| 2000 | عيلة 10 نجوم |
| 2001 | The Belle Policewoman |
| 2003 | أوه يا الكرة |
| 2004 | On the Fly |
| 2005 | Yawash Yawash |
| 2009 | الإنس والجن |
| 2010 | بيت أبونا |
| 2013 | مدينة الزنوج |
| 2015 | Cartoon Factory |
| 2016 | Alhokm Lakum |
| 2017 | مبروك ما ياكم |
| 2018 | Mamnu Al Khurooj |
| 2018 | The Magnificent Seven |
| 2018 | آخر رجل بالعالم |
| 2019 | صلبوخ وعائلته الكريمة |
| 2019 | Leila Zefta |
