= Ali Al-Biladi =

19th and 20th-century Bahraini cleric, historian, writer and poet

Personal life
- Born: 1857 CE/1274 AH Bilad Al Qadeem, Bahrain
- Died: 1922 CE/1340 AH Qatif, Saudi Arabia

Religious life
- Religion: Islam

Sheikh Ali bin Hassan bin Ali bin Sulayman Al-Biladi (Arabic: علي البلادي) (c. 1857–1922; 1274 AH – 1340 AH) was a Bahraini Shia cleric, historian, writer and poet. He is very well known for his book Anwarul Badrayn (The Lights of the Two Moons) which it contains biographies of many Shia clerics who were in Qatif, al-Ahsa and Bahrain.

== Early life and education ==
Al-Biladi was born around 1857 CE (1274 AH) in the old village of Al-Bilad (now Bilad Al Qadeem in northern Bahrain. Al-Biladi moved with his mother to Qatif, another Saudi city, after his father died in Rabigh, Saudi Arabia in ca. 1864 (1281 AH) on Hajj to Medina. Around ca. 1867 (1284 AH), the time of the move, many Bahraini dignitaries moved or were relocated there, including Hakim Ali ibn Khalifah Al Khalifa (the ruler forced to abdicate and exiled by the British for maritime piracy). Qatif’s large Shia population made it a common destination for those on the island of that faith.

Ahmed Al-Taan had previously come from Bahrain to Qatif with his family and hosted Al-Biladi and his mother, who died two years later, becoming Al-Biladi’s tutor and godfather in Islamic studies. Al-Biladi trained thus in Arabic grammar, rhetoric, and fiqh (jurisprudence).

Afterwards, he went to Najaf to complete his madrasa study with such illustrious colleagues as Muhammad Husayn Kazimi, Muhammad Taha Najaf, Murtaza Mahdi al-Kashmiri al-Najafi, Mahmoud Dhahab al-Najafi, and Hassan bin Matar al-Jazaery.

== Works ==
He has different works in Islamic (Shi’ite) jurisprudence, creed, and history, all written in Arabic, and never been translated into English or any other language. His works include:

- Anwār Al Badrayn Fī Tarājom Ulamā’ Al Qatīf Wal Ahsā’ Wal Bahrain. (The Lights of the Two Moons: The biographies of the scholars of Qatif, Ahsa and Bahrain).
- Al-Ḥaqqul Wāḍeḥ fi Aḥwāl al-‘Abd aṣ-Ṣāliḥ. (The Obvious right: The Biography of The Righteous Slave), That book contains a specialised biography for the cleric Ahmed Al-Taan.
- Zawāher az-Zawājir Fī Ma’rifat Al Kabā’er.
- Jannāton Tajrī Min Tahtiha Al Anhār.
