= Camino a Idilia =

Camino A Idilia

Studio album by Shaila
- Released: November 18, 2006
- Recorded: March–August, 2006
- Genre: Punk rock
- Length: 45:51
- Label: SPE Discos
- Producers: Charlie Villareal and Shaila

Camino a Idilia is the fourth LP released by the Argentinian punk rock formerly hardcore punk band Shaila, released on November 18, 2006.

The album was recorded and mixed between April and September by Javier Suarez at El Altillo Studio. Drums and bass were recorded in March 2006 in MCE Studio, Buenos Aires - Argentina by Martin Carrizo and Pablo Sicilano.

Drum Doctor: Martin Carrizo

This is the first album mastered in a foreign country, in Blastin Room Studios, Fort Collins, Colorado - USA by Jason Livermore.

== Track listing ==
1. "Sudamérica II - El Fracaso Regional" – 2:40
2. "Los Caminantes" – 2:46
3. "Noviembre" – 3:32
4. "Paralogismo en 6" – 2:41
5. "La Perfección de los Soberbios" – 2:51
6. "Sudamérica I - Malinche" – 3:19
7. "L'amour et L'déception" – 3:11
8. "Valparaíso" – 2:57
9. "Incendio Global" – 2:47
10. "Idilia" – 3:16
11. "Ironía(s)" – 2:20
12. "Sudamérica III - La Meta Supranacional" – 2:31
13. "Aunque Digan Que No" – 2:46
14. "Alter Ego/Hidden Track "Gracias"" – 8:14

All lyrics by Joaquín Guillén. Music on all song by Pablo Coniglio, except "Paralogismo en 6" by Joaquin Guillén. All songs arranged by Shaila. Matías Alvarez sings in "La Meta Supranacional". Acoustic Guitars by Pablo Coniglio in "Alter Ego", "Aunque Digan Que No", "La Perfección De Los Soberbios", "L'amour et l'decéption" and "Incendio Global".

== Personnel ==
- Joaquin Guillén - Vocals
- Pablo Coniglio - Bass Guitar And Backing Vocals
- Yasser - Guitar
- Santiago Tortora - Guitar
- Guido X - Drums

== Singles ==
- Sudamerica II - El Fracaso Regional
- Incendio Global

== Videos ==
- Sudamerica II - El Fracaso Regional on YouTube
- Incendio Global on YouTube
