= Noaim =

Map of Manama in 1926.

Noaim or Al-Noaim (Arabic: النعيم; an-No'aim) is a neighborhood of Bahrain's capital Manama. It is to the west of Manama city center. Due to urban expansion, increasing population, size, and historical conditions, it has become like a semi-district, separate from Manama with many neighborhoods.

The population of Noaim is about 6,000 people. Furthermore, more than ten thousand people who descend from this district live in other areas and villages of Bahrain, the majority of whom have remained in contact with their families, relatives, and friends who still live in the district, and frequently return to visit at religious occasions such as holidays, Ashura and Ramadan.

One of the most important reasons for the isolation of the Noaim from Manama is the construction of the Wall of Manama, which divided the neighborhood of Noaim into a southern part within the wall, and a northern part outside the wall. Since most people in the city had professions related to the sea like building ships, pearls trade and fishing, a lot of southern residents moved north outside the wall. Thus, Noaim remained separate from Manama. Few traces of the wall remain, restoring the urban link between Al Noaim and Manama neighborhoods.

== History ==
The history of the neighborhood is generally vague until the twentieth century due to the lack of records regarding it, the few surviving records were preserved via oral narrations reported through the generations.

The oldest documented event is the death of scholar master Hashem Al-Toblani Al- Bharani (the author of El-Burhan fi Tafseer Al-Quran: Proof in the Interpretation of the Quran) in one of its houses in 1695. He was married to the widow of another scholar from that region (sheikh Ali ben sheikh Abdullah ben sheikh Hussain ben Ali ben Kenbar Al-Dabiri). Ali had a well-known house in the area, in which AL-Toblani passed away. Sheikh Hussain ben Ali Al-Dabiri (sheikh Ali's grandfather) was also a resident of the area.This shows that the area was inhabited and housing a number of scholars for over 400 years.

== Origin ==
According to village elders, the name "Noaim" describes good land, and bliss for its people, the nukhazah (ship captains) and merchants of pearls. It was famous for the beauty of nature and its proximity to the sea.

The village retains its authentic Bahraini identity, although it houses thousands of migrant workers.

== Modern era ==
In 1930 a clinic was built in Manama, which later became the nucleus of the hospital, which was established in 1940. Noaim Hospital was the first public hospital built on the land of Bahrain.

In 1953, the Noaim Cultural and Sports Club was established. Originally hosting cultural, political and sporting activities, it later focused on sports activities, especially handball. The club achieved a national reputation. In 2001, after extensive integration, the club was merged with other clubs in the capital under the name of Al Shabab Club. The Noaim Cultural Center provides cultural activities.

In the 1950s, Noaim was one of the active centers of the reformist political movement. Mr. Ali ibn al-Sayyid Ibrahim Kamal al-Din al-Ghuraifi (a religious scholar and one of the symbols of the region at that time) was among the eight people elected to represent the district in the National Union. The Union emerged as a unified national front to demand political reforms in the administrative apparatus, the judiciary and the election of a representative People's Assembly.

In 1963 the state established a boy's middle school in Noaim located on the sea. Generations from across Bahrain graduated from this school, especially those from villages in the north province. Noaim's high school was active in the political field. Throughout its history, the students protested many times for regional and national causes. The area witnessed the establishment of other schools like the primary school for girls located besides the west orphanage. It was replaced with Soumya's school, located south of the cemetery, and Ibn Khaldun primary school for boys in the west. It was changed to Hatin school located in the soufi region west of Noaim.

In the 1960s and 1970s many families moved to housing projects established by the state in other areas. Much of the area was converted to into commercial property, hosting malls, supermarkets and hotels.

== Notable residents ==
- Mohammed Hasan Kamaluddin
