= Sabreen (disambiguation) =

Sabreen (Arabic: صابرين) is a Palestinian musical group.

Sabreen may also refer to:

- Sabreen (actress) (born 1967), Egyptian actress
- Sabreen Hisbani (born 1978), Pakistani-Canadian actress
- Maysaa Sabreen (born 1974), Syrian economist and public servant

== See also ==
- Sabrin
- Sabrine
