= Leila Al Mutawa =

Bahraini novelist and journalist

- ليلى المطوع
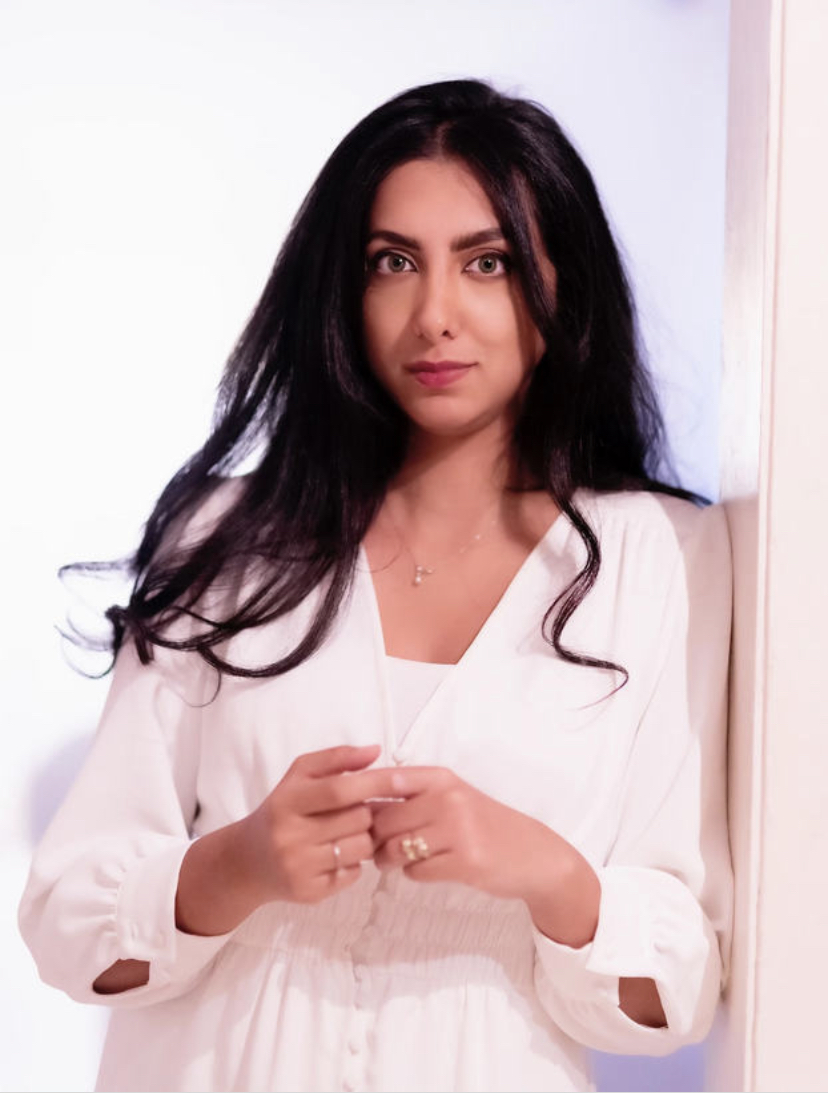
- Born: 1986 (age 39–40); Muharraq, Bahrain
- Occupations: Novelist, journalist
- Years active: 2012–present
- Notable work: The Forgotten Between Two Waters

Leila Al Mutawa (born 1986) is a Bahraini novelist and journalist. She has published two novels, My Heart Is Not for Sale (2012) and The Forgotten Between Two Waters (2024). She has participated in a number of international literary programmes and events, including the International Prize for Arabic Fiction workshop, the Littérature Live festival in Lyon, the Diriyah Storytelling Festival, a literary conference at Jean Moulin University Lyon 3, the Dibrugarh University International Literature Festival in India, and the Emirates Airline Festival of Literature in Dubai.

== Literary career ==
Leila Al Mutawa’s first novel, My Heart Is Not for Sale, was published in 2012.

In 2016, Al Mutawa participated in the eighth edition of the International Prize for Arabic Fiction’s Nadwa, which was held in Abu Dhabi and brought together six Arab writers in a literary programme for young writers. The prize’s archive describes her as a Bahraini novelist and journalist born in 1986 and lists My Heart Is Not for Sale among her works at the time.

In 2019, Al Mutawa participated in the literary book project How Many Lungs Does the Coast Have?, associated with Sharjah’s selection as World Book Capital.

In November 2020, she participated in the 39th Sharjah International Book Fair as part of a session examining the relationship between history and literature.

In May 2021, Al Mutawa participated in the Littérature Live festival, organised by Villa Gillet in Lyon, France. She appeared in the “Regards féminins” programme alongside Saudi writer Ghada Abboud and Emirati poet Alya Alshamsi.

Her second novel, The Forgotten Between Two Waters, was published in 2024. The novel explores the relationship between water, place, memory and identity, and evokes the transformation of Bahrain’s coastal environment by intertwining individual and collective memory with history and myth. The novel has been discussed in critical articles and interviews published by several Arab newspapers and cultural magazines.

In 2024, Al Mutawa participated in the 55th Cairo International Book Fair, where she discussed her novel The Forgotten Between Two Waters and her writing experience.

In February 2025, Al Mutawa participated as a guest at the Diriyah Storytelling Festival in Saudi Arabia.

In November 2025, Al Mutawa participated as an invited writer in an international conference organised by Jean Moulin University Lyon 3 in France on ecological approaches to the narrative and aesthetic forms of environmental trauma in contemporary literature. According to the conference programme, she participated in a closing session examining the relationship between environmental trauma and literature and presented a paper titled “The Forgotten Between Two Waters: Submerged Memory and Metamorphosed Bodies”.

In January 2026, Al Mutawa participated in the 57th Cairo International Book Fair as part of the theme “A Generation Writes the World in Its Own Way”.

In January 2026, she participated in the Emirates Airline Festival of Literature in Dubai and appeared in the festival programme in the session “If Not for Fear, What Would We Write?” alongside Ayesha Sultan and Mohammed Samir Nada. The festival’s official page also records her participation in another session titled “Love as Bad Fiction”.

In February 2026, Al Mutawa participated in the third edition of the Dibrugarh University International Literature Festival in Assam, India. The festival’s official website lists her among the speakers for the 2026 edition and records her participation in the session “Of Identity and Belonging” alongside several writers from different countries.

== Works ==
=== Novels ===
- My Heart Is Not for Sale, 2012.
- The Forgotten Between Two Waters, 2024.

== Selected literary appearances ==
- Eighth Nadwa of the International Prize for Arabic Fiction, Abu Dhabi, 2016.
- How Many Lungs Does the Coast Have? project, Sharjah, 2019.
- Sharjah International Book Fair, 2020.
- Littérature Live festival, Lyon, France, 2021.
- Cairo International Book Fair, 2024.
- Diriyah Storytelling Festival, Saudi Arabia, 2025.
- International conference on environmental trauma in literature and the arts, Jean Moulin University Lyon 3, France, 2025.
- Cairo International Book Fair, 2026.
- Emirates Airline Festival of Literature, Dubai, 2026.
- Dibrugarh University International Literature Festival, Assam, India, 2026.

== Critical reception ==
Critical and journalistic writing about The Forgotten Between Two Waters has addressed themes of water, memory, place, identity and environmental transformation. It has also examined the novel’s relationship with Bahrain’s cultural history and with individual and collective memory. Interviews and critical readings of the novel have appeared in several Arab newspapers and cultural magazines.
