= Sabrin Burshid =

Bahraini actress and broadcaster (1985–2019)

- صابرين بورشيد
- Burshid in 2018
- Born: Sabrin Ahmed Abdullah Burshid; June 11, 1985; Manama, Bahrain
- Died: July 22, 2019 (aged 34); Istanbul, Turkey
- Occupations: Actress; broadcaster
- Years active: 2008—2019
- Employers: BRTC; Kuwait TV; MBC Group; Al-Adalah TV

Sabrin Ahmed Abdullah Burshid (Arabic: صابرين أحمد عيد الله بورشيد; June 11, 1985 – July 22, 2019) was a Bahraini actress and broadcaster.

== Biography ==
Burshid was born in Manama, Bahrain, to a Bahraini father and a Saudi mother. She studied media and public relations, but left school in 2008 to work at the Bahrain Radio and Television Corporation. She made her television hosting debut in the summer of 2009. She presented a reality show for Ramadan 2010, winning the "Most Beautiful Arab Broadcaster" award, and was one of the hosts of the Kuwaiti show Ali Al-Seif on Al-Adalah TV.

Her first acting role was in the 2012 Eid al-Fitr play Misbah Zain; her friend Shaila Sabt helped her to obtain the role. In 2018, she moved to Kuwait for work-related reasons.

== Illness and death ==
In April 2019, Burshid's family revealed that she was sleeping excessively and did not remember her friends' names. Tests conducted at the Bahrain Defence Force Hospital revealed three lymphomas in the left hemisphere of her brain. This required immediate surgery and her father appealed to King Hamad bin Isa Al Khalifa for aid in obtaining quick treatment, a plea that gained support from activists and artists across the Gulf.

The Royal Court agreed to send her abroad for treatment, and the Ministry of Health arranged for her travel to Germany. Prime Minister Khalifa bin Salman Al Khalifa ultimately organized for her to travel to Turkey, where her condition did not improve, and she died in Istanbul on July 22, 2019. Her funeral service was held in Manama.

== Works ==
=== Television series ===
Filmography
Year	Series	Role
2014	Ahl Eldar	Shamsa
2014	Kasr al-Khawater	Duha
2015	Imra'a Mafquda	Noor
2015	Al Nour	Hind
2016	Al Wajh Al Mosta'ar	Sheikha
2016	Tales: My Deepest Soul	Aisha
2016	Darab Alearayis	Fatimah
2016	Distances	Agadir
2016	Tales: Rosy Dreams	Nouf
2016	On Remand	Nawal
2017	Hayat Thanya	Faten
2017	Dumue Al'Afaei	Khadija
2017	Amany Al-Umr	Shahd
2017	Silk Threads	Sabrin
2018	Al-Muwajaha	Nouf
2018	Mahtet Entzar	Nusaiba
2019	Oshaq Raghm Al-Talaq	Aamal
2019	Ana Andi Nuss	Sarah
2019	Agenda	
2020	Umi Dalal We Aleial	Shouq

=== Theatre ===
Acting career
Year	Play	Role
2012	Misbah Zain	Majami
2014	Guardian of the Forest Hut	
2016	خفيف خفيف	
2017	هذا الميدان يا حميدان	

=== Broadcasting ===
Filmography
Year of debut	TV show	Broadcaster
2009	Bahrain Summer Festival	Bahrain TV
2015	Kuwait Nights	Kuwait TV
2019	Soraya	Al-Adalah TV
