= Mohammed Hasan Kamaluddin =

Bahraini cabinet minister (born 1941)

Mohammed Hasan Kamaluddin (Arabic: محمد حسن كمال الدين, born 1941) is a Bahraini former cabinet minister, member of parliament, ex-diplomat, poet, historian, writer and researcher. He is best known for having published the first Encyclopedia of Bahraini History, stretching from 3000 B.C. to the modern Bahraini state. It is the largest and first work of its kind in the GCC region.

== Early life ==
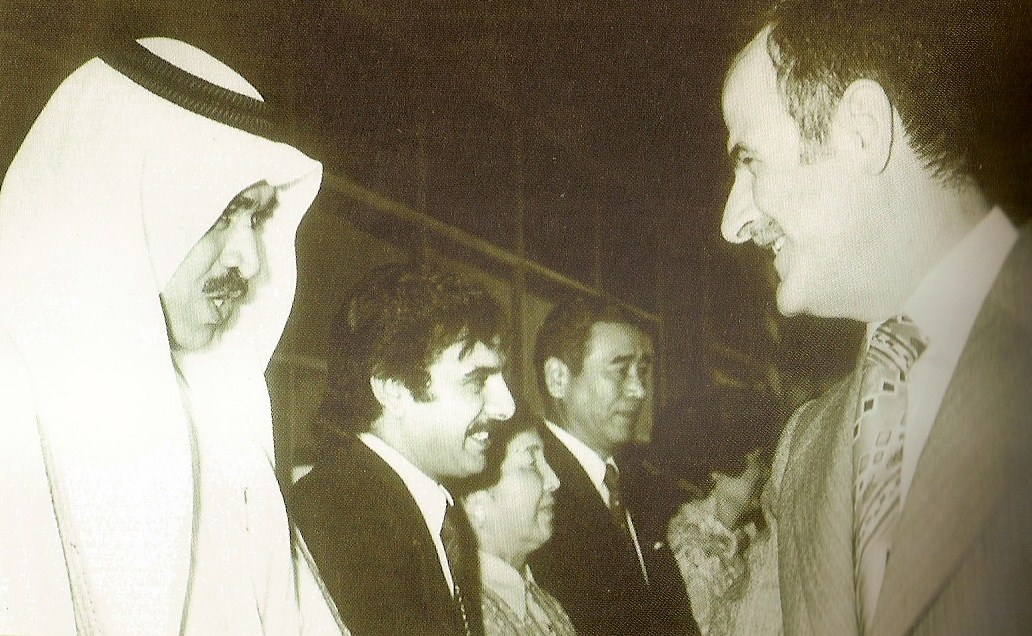
M.H. Kamaluddin with former President of Syria Hafez al-Assad in India (1978)

Born in 1941 in Noaim district, Manama, his father Syed Ali Kamaluddin was a revolutionist and a political activist against the British colonial influence in Bahrain, and the head of the National Union Committee, a nationalist political organization formed in the 1950s. At the age of 7, Mohammed was forced to work in his uncle's shop, who treated him harshly. However, upon hearing of the commencement of the registration in elementary schools, he secretly registered his name in the applying student's list, only to escape from working with his uncle. He was therefore officially enrolled in the Western Primary School in Manama. During his school life, he participated in several competitions and received awards in public speaking and poetry. He was also awarded for academic excellence throughout his school years.

== Creation of a Literacy School ==
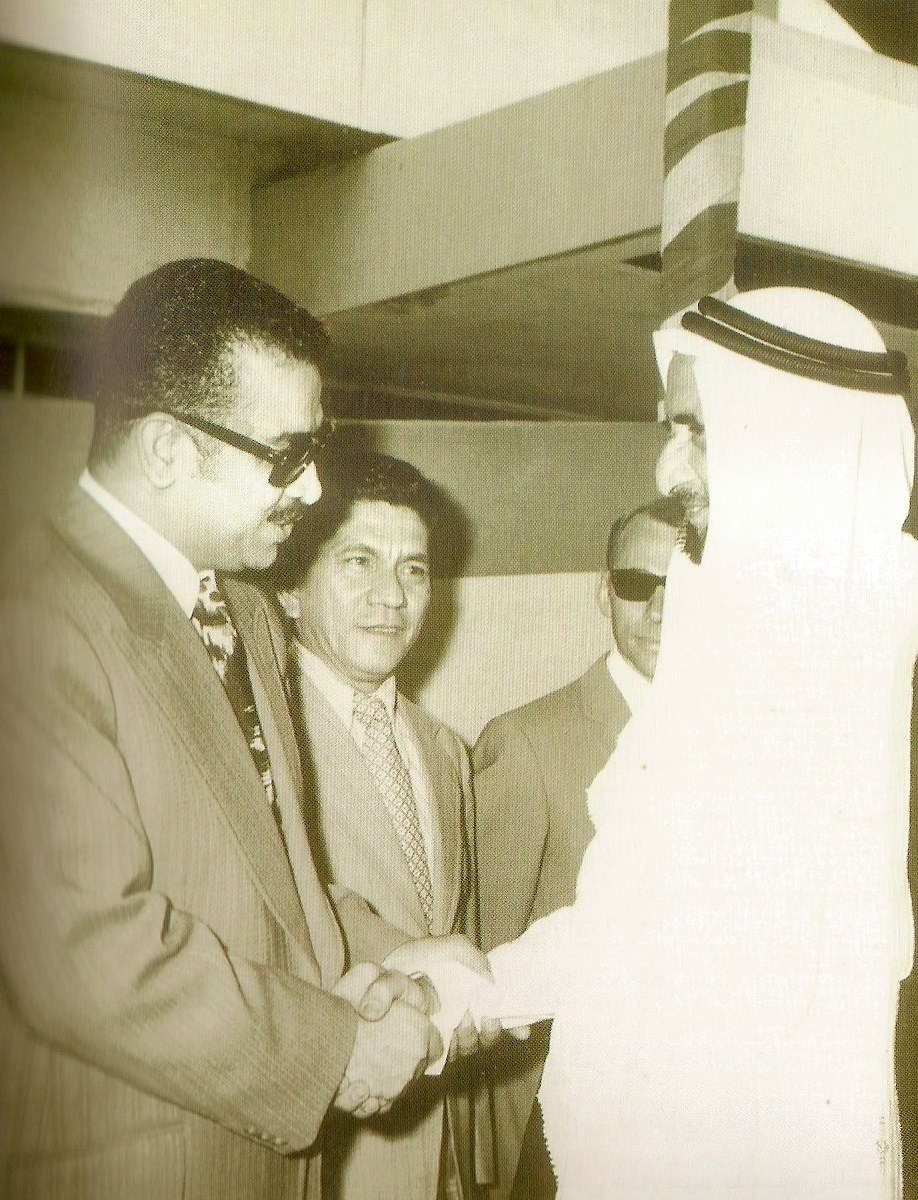
M.H. Kamaluddin with former ruler of Dubai Sheikh Rashid Al Maktoum (1976)

At the age of 16, Syed Ali Kamaluddin, the father of Mohammed, was deported for 14 years by the British authorities in Bahrain headed by Charles Belgrave, along with the other 7 members of the National Union Committee, upon declaring the committee illegal by the British for its activities against the British colonial influence and its presence in Bahrain.

In 1956, Kamaluddin created the first private literacy school in Bahrain, as a personal contribution to his society, aiming to fight illiteracy that was spread in Bahrain during the 1950s, and provide an opportunity of education for the illiterate adults, as no official schools existed in Bahrain before the year 1919.
With the help of local elderly men who supported and encouraged the idea, the starting location of the school was at Noaim's Western Matam (Hussainia), where Kamaluddin personally taught private lessons of the basics of reading and writing the Arabic language. The number of students soon expanded, as a great number of elderly men and women of the area attended the school. Soon after, the department of education in Bahrain acknowledged his personal yet highly cultural and advanced contribution as the first of its kind in Bahrain, and decided to expand the school by providing additional teachers and supplying the students with great number of educational books, and opened a section for women. At that time, Noaim’s area witnessed a huge trend towards education, and therefore Kamaluddin raised a demand to the department of education in Bahrain to open two official public schools in the area, a school for boys and another for girls. The suggestion was accepted, and so the department officially announced the opening of two new schools in the area of Noeim in the 1960s, making Noaim one of the few areas in Bahrain to have educational schools at that time.

== Establishing Noaim's Cultural Club ==
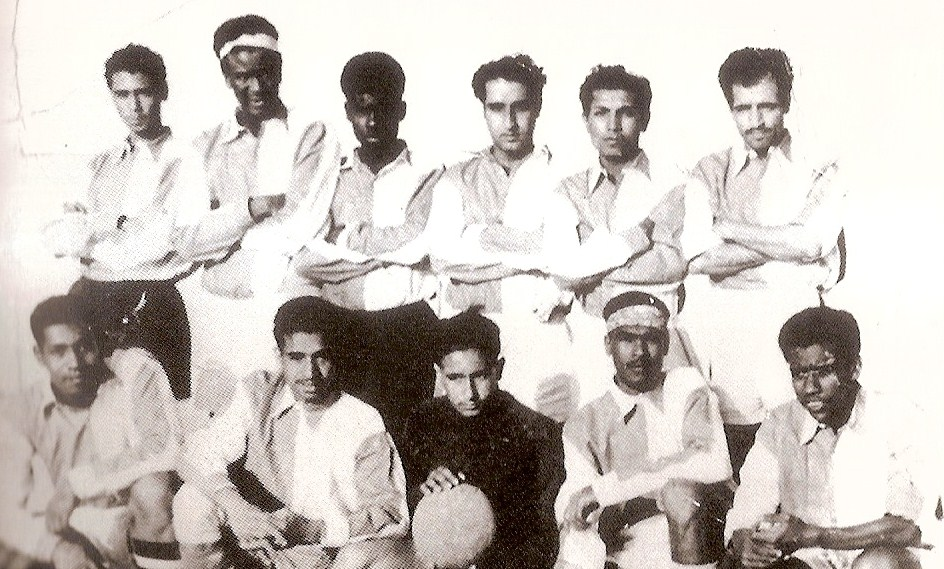
The 1959 National Soccer Team which M.H. Kamaluddin was a member of (second from left - lower row)

As the creation of the Literacy School was widely successful and acknowledged by the official authorities of the state, Kamaluddin created the first social, cultural, and sports club in the Noaim area in 1959. Again, the elderly notables applauded the idea, and therefore Kamaluddin communicated with the Secretary of the Bahraini Government at that time, to officially approve the establishment of the club, and the club was therefore officially established in 1959. The club held several cultural, sports, and social events and activities that were acknowledged at a national level. The first soccer team of the club was formed in 1959. A local theatre was also established, and a number of high quality plays were performed by actors from the area. The club still operates as one of the well known cultural clubs in the Kingdom of Bahrain under the name of "The Cultural Center of Noaim Youth", and Kamaluddin is currently its honorary president.

== Education and studies ==
Kamaluddin studied Arabic literature and received a Bachelor of Arts degree in Arabic language and literature from the University of Damascus, Syria in 1969. He then received a master's degree in history from the University of Mysore in India. He also received an honorary doctoral degree in history from the Institute of Arabian History in Baghdad, Iraq.

== Constituent Assembly ==
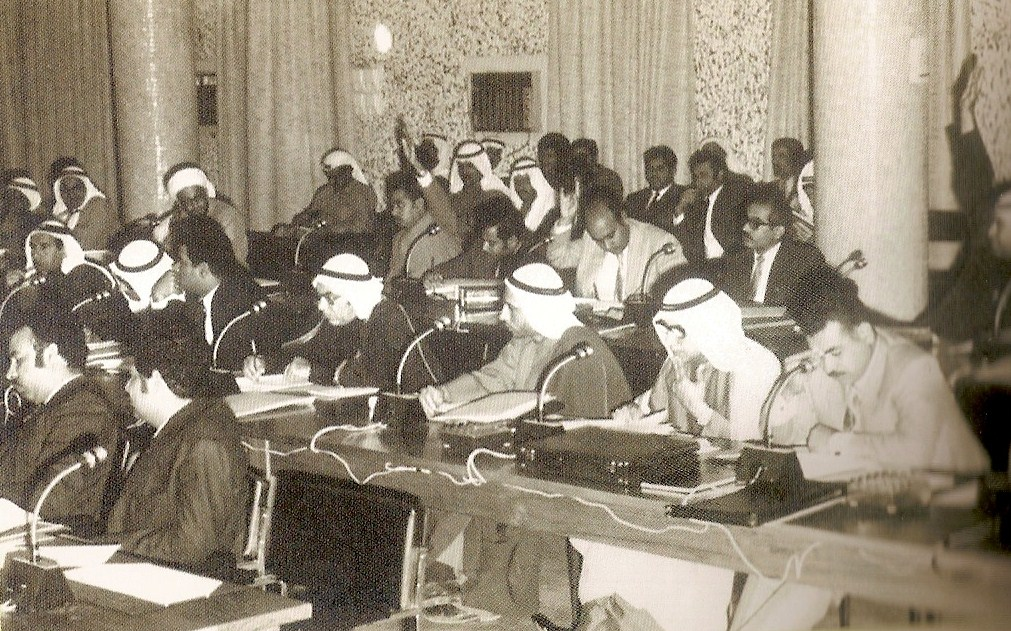
M.H. Kamaluddin appears on the very right of the photo in one of the Constituent Assembly's sessions (1973).

In December, 1972, Kamaluddin was elected as a member of the first Constituent Assembly in Bahrain. The elections held to choose the members of the Assembly were the first national elections held in Bahrain. The assembly was charged with drafting and ratifying the first constitution in the history of Bahrain. Kamaluddin was the youngest member of the Assembly, however he played a great role in terms of interpreting constitutional texts of other Arabian states and correcting the language of the constitution's articles, due to his specialization in the Arabic language and grammar. In 1973, the first Bahraini Constitution was successfully promulgated and the Assembly was dismissed.

== Bahraini Consulate in India ==
In 1974, Kamaluddin was appointed by the Ministry of Foreign Affairs as the first Bahraini Consul General in Mumbai, India, thereby establishing the first Bahraini Consulate General in India through which most of the trade and dealings with India went through, as no Bahraini consulate or embassy existed in India at that time. During his years as a General Consul, he was appointed as the Vice President of the Indian Arabian Friendship Society. Due to his huge role in strengthening the relationships between both India and Bahrain, the government of Bahrain insisted he continues his work as a Consul General in India for 6 years, until he requested a resignation in 1980.

== Role in the Bahraini Parliament ==
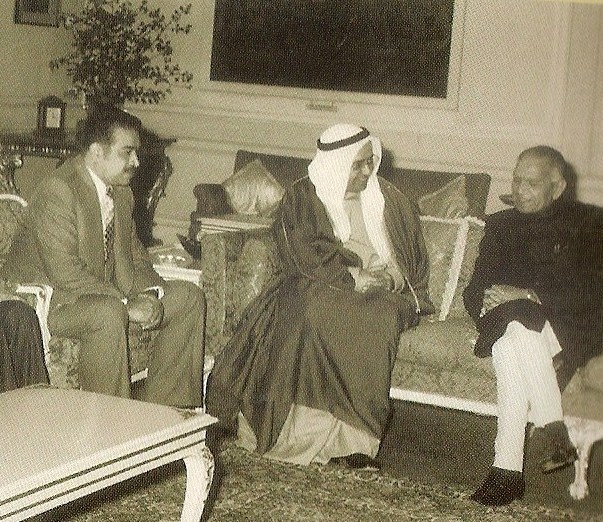
General Consul M.H. Kamaluddin in an official meeting with the former President of India Fakhruddin Ali Ahmed

In 1992–2001, Kamaluddin was appointed three times as a member of the Consultative Council "Shura Council" of the single chamber Bahraini parliament, as the Shura Council was the only legislative body of Bahrain at that time. Kamaluddin, along with the other members of the Shura Council, played an important role in passing a huge number of acts and legislations during the 1990s. Kamaluddin was elected to the position of the Secretary General of the Committee of Foreign Affairs in the Shura Council.

Kamaluddin had, besides his activities in the council, several personal activities and contributions. During the Second Gulf War, he established a national charitable committee supporting the Iraqi victims of the war and the embargo following it, and travelled several times with the support of the Bahraini Government to Iraq to supply hospitals and local families with huge amounts of medications and food donated by Bahrainis to the committee.

One of his personal contributions is the Good Offices mission attempt in Iraq. He raised a suggestion to the government that he personally performs a Good Offices mission in Iraq, and the government agreed on such suggestion and hoped the mission succeeds. His mission concentrated on two aspects: receiving a clarification from the Iraqi government about its weapons of mass destruction and that Iraq does not possess such weapons, and a request that Iraq changes its tone of political discourse with the Gulf countries, to ensure that it has no intentions of future invasion of the Gulf's territorial lands. Kamaluddin met with the highest authoritative figures in Iraq, including Qusai Saddam Hussein, the son of the former Iraqi president Saddam Hussein. The mission believed to have brought together some high authority figures of both Iraq and the GCC for negotiations. However, for political reasons, negotiations failed, and the mission's goals were not achieved.

== Ministry of State ==
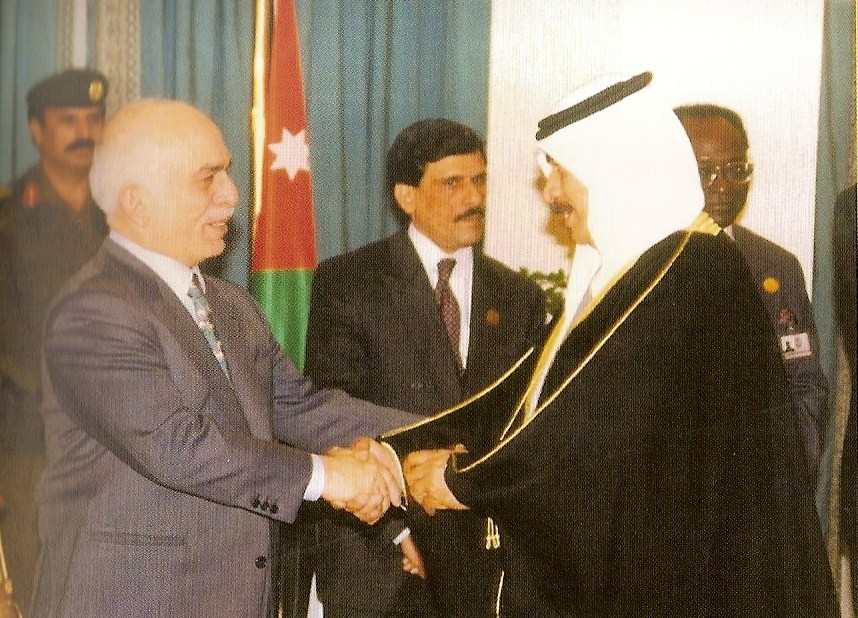
King Hussein Bin Talal shaking hands with M.H. Kamaluddin in Jordan (1996)

Upon the promulgation of the second constitution of Bahrain in 2002, Kamaluddin was appointed as a Minister of State in the Kingdom of Bahrain.

== Encyclopedia of Bahrain's History ==
In 2001, Kamaluddin sent a letter to the Prime Minister of Bahrain His Highness Sheikh Khalifa Bin Salman suggesting a formation of a specialized team to write the history of Bahrain since 3000 B.C. until the modern Bahraini state. His Highness agreed on the suggestion, and the "Committee of Writing the Encyclopedia of Bahrain's History" was officially formed, headed by Mr. Kamaluddin. This encyclopedia is the first of its kind in Bahrain and the Gulf region, and includes 10 parts, each part containing 350-450 pages. In 2004, the project was completed, and the Encyclopedia was ready for publication. However, the publication of the encyclopedia was deliberately hindered, and the governmental authorities refused to publish it upon its completion, giving no reasonable justification to such refusal. However, after five years of unjustifiable delays by the government, Kamaluddin published in February 2010, at his own expense, the first four parts of the encyclopedia.

== Other publications ==
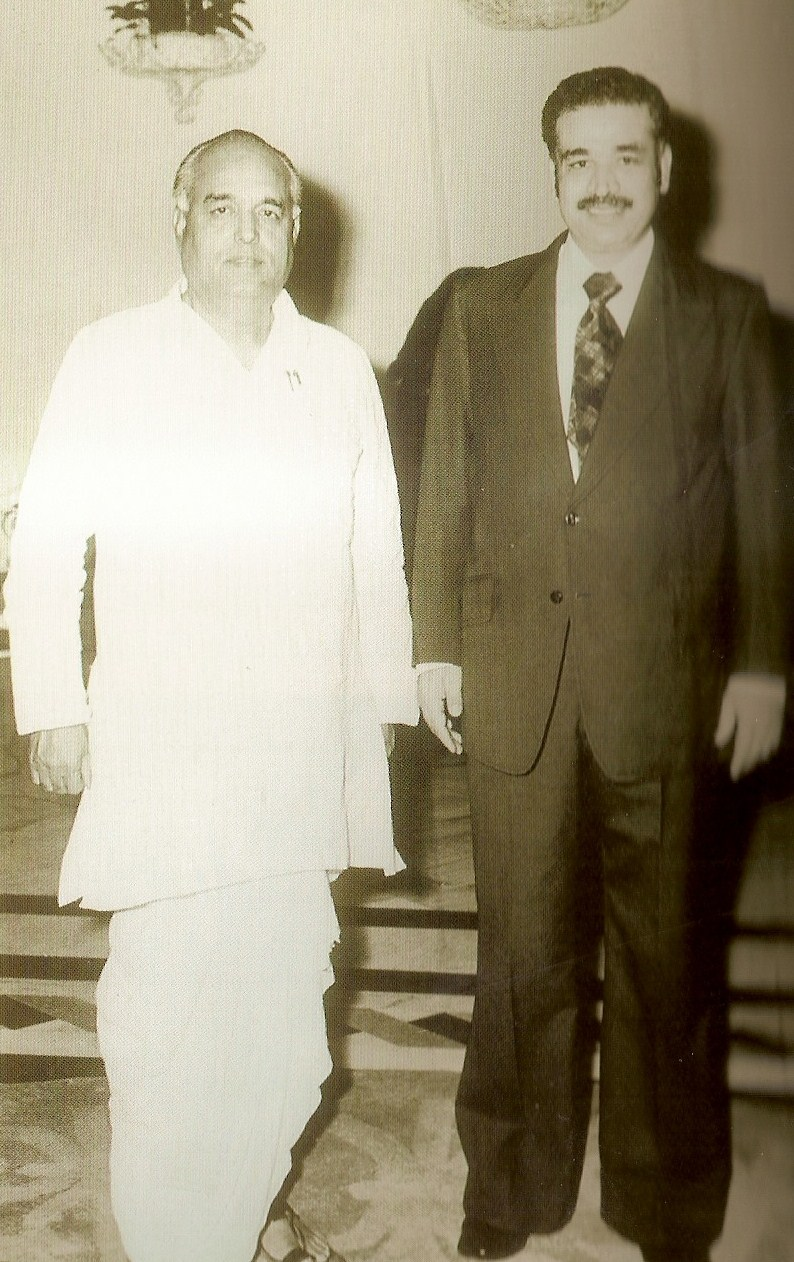
M.H. Kamaluddin with Vasantdada Patil, former Chief Minister of Maharashtra in India (1977)

In addition to the Encyclopedia of Bahraini History, Kamaluddin published 11 other books: "Diaries of a Minister on the Shore of Failure", a collection of his personal memoirs; "On the Banks of Motherland", a biography of his father Syed Ali Kamaluddin, the famous Bahraini revolutionist during the British colonial influence in Bahrain in the 1950s, "The Genius of Affiliation", a biography book of the Al Fardaan Family, one of the gulf's leading merchant families and founders of pearl trading and who are of Bahraini origin; "Human Rights between Hilf al-Fudul and the United Nations' Charter", a book containing a research about the link between the human rights principles contained in the UN Charter and the principles contained in the Hilf Al-Fudul document; "Two Faces", a biography of two well-known political figures in Bahrain, Mr. Ali Fakhro and Shaikh Mohammed Bin Mubarak Al-Khalifa; "The history of the laws and codes between Dilmun and Mesopotamia"; which is a research of the laws that existed in Dilmun civilization, and its relation with the Mesopotamian civilization; "1000 Arabic Proverbs"; "The Artist Abdulla Al-Muharraqi: Unique Creativity", which is a biography of the internationally famous Bahraini artist Abdulla Al Muharraqi; and "Al Hayrat" which talks about pearl diving.

== Poetry ==
M.H. Kamaluddin is one of the famous poets of Bahrain and the Gulf region. He published six poetry collections, containing a large number of poems in both traditional and modern styles. He represented Bahrain in several poetic conferences throughout the Middle Eastern region, and received a Legion of Honor for excellence in poetry by the King of Bahrain Sheikh Hamad Bin Isa.

== Other memberships ==
1. Member of the Bahraini Authors and Writers Society.
2. Member of the National Council for Culture, Art, and Literature.
3. Member of the Bahrain's History and Monument's society.
4. Member of the Union of the Arab Historians.
5. Member of the Sheikh Isa's Cultural Royal Center's Board of Trustees.
6. Vice President of Sundooq Al Zakaa - Kingdom of Bahrain.
7. Creator and head of the Private Committee In Charge of Honoring Bahrain's Pioneering Intellectuals and Innovators.
8. The honorary president of Noaim's Charity Fund.
9. Creator of the Studies and Researches department in the Ministry of Foreign Affairs.

== Awards received ==
- Received the former Prince of Bahrain Sheikh Isa Al Khalifa's Legion of Honor for national work.
- Received the King of Bahrain Hamad Al Khalifa's Legion of Honor for excellence in poetry.
