= Masouma Abdelrahim =

Bahraini politician

- معصومة عبد الرحيم

Member of the Council of Representatives
- Incumbent
- Assumed office 2018
- Monarch: Hamad bin Isa Al Khalifa
- Prime Minister: Khalifa bin Salman Al Khalifa, Salman, Crown Prince of Bahrain
- Preceded by: Ali Al Ateesh
- Parliamentary group: independent
- Constituency: Sixth Constituency, Capital Governorate

Personal details
- Born: Masouma Hassan Abdul-Hussein Abdelrahim
- Occupation: doctor, politician

Masouma Hassan Abdul-Hussein Abdul-Rahim (Arabic: معصومة عبد الرحيم) is a Bahraini politician, psychiatrist, social activist, and columnist of Iranian origin. She was sworn into the Council of Representatives on December 12, 2018, for the sixth constituency of the Capital Governorate.

== Career ==
Abdelrahim headed the drug and alcohol unit at the Ministry of Health.

== Council of Representatives ==
Abdelrahim entered the political arena when she ran in the 2018 Bahraini general election, in which she ran for the sixth district in the Capital Governorate. In the first round on November 24, 2018, she received 1,332 votes for 26.09%, requiring a second round on December 1, in which she defeated Ali Al Ateesh (the incumbent elected in the 2014 Bahraini general election from the Muslim League party) with 2,137 votes for 54.20%.

== Controversy ==
Abdelrahim sparked controversy when she posted a video on her Snapchat account calling for the severing of child molesters’ penises.

Awal Online reported that Abdelrahim closed her Instagram account after harsh criticisms of the new MPs in comments to a video of several in a Secretariat workshop that she posted.

In a symposium held by the National Constituent Assembly in Sanad, Abdelrahim reported that World Health Organization statistics indicate 20–30,000 drug addicts in Bahrain. Previously, the Health Ministry had refused to officially declare the number.
