= Tekken Master =

Bahraini professional esports player

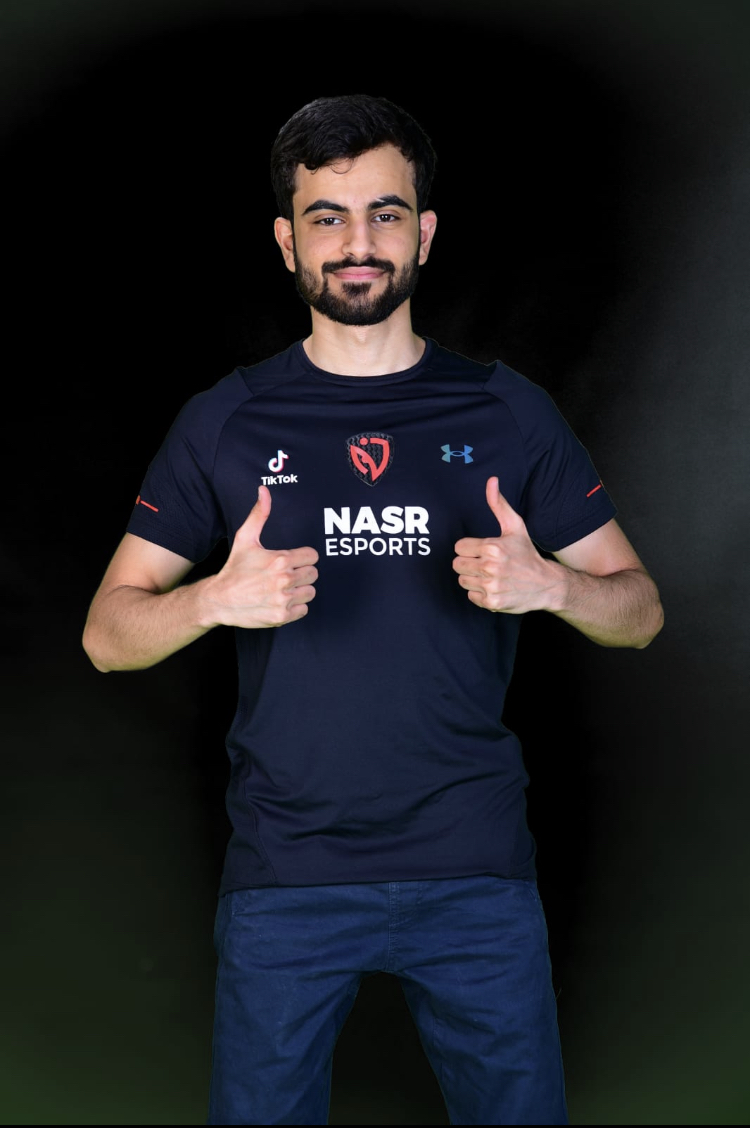

Personal information
- Name: Sayed Hashem Ahmed
- Born: 1995 (age 30–31)
- Nationality: Bahraini

Current team
- Team: NASR eSports
- Games: Tekken; Mortal Kombat; Injustice 2

Career information
- Playing career: 2010–present

Team history
- 2017–present: NASR eSports

Sayed Hashem Ahmed, better known as Tekken Master (Arabic: سيد هاشم أحمد), is a professional esports player. He is largely credited with popularizing the e-sports industry in the Persian Gulf.

Hashem is known for being recognized by the King of Bahrain Hamad bin Isa Al Khalifa following his win at the Brazil Game Show Tournament for Mortal Kombat 11 game in 2019.

He is also notable for being given the accolade of "the best in the Middle East." by his peers at the Tekken Tag Tournament 2 Middle East Championship in Dubai.

Hashem, under the name Tekken Master, is currently sponsored by NASR ESPORTS.

== Early years ==
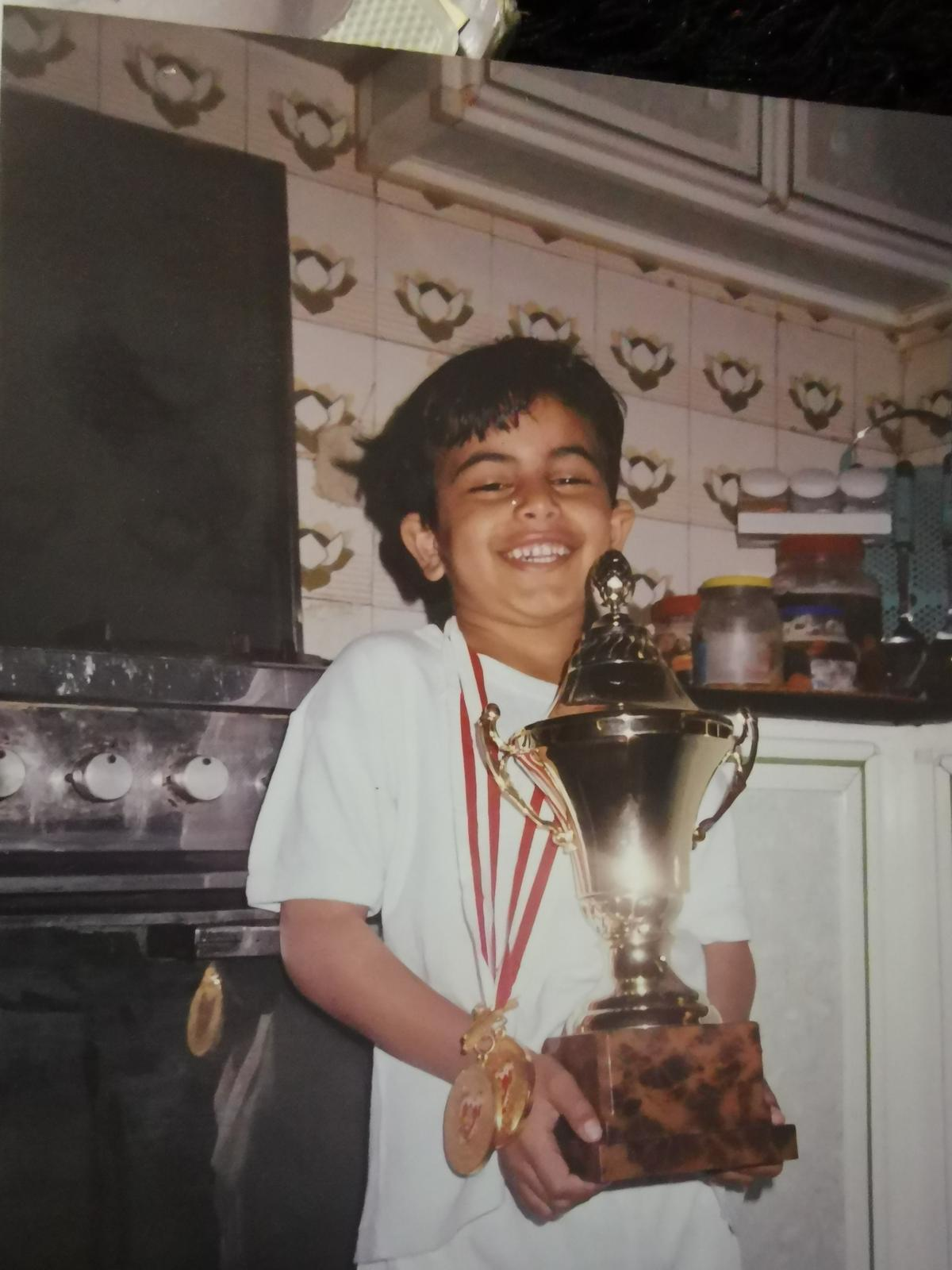
"I always wanted to be a champion".

The youngest of four, Hashem began playing video games when he was six years old.

He showed interest for fighting games early on, inspired by his older brothers.

== Professional career ==
Hashem's professional career began in 2010 when he won the 2v2 Tekken 6 Tournament in Kuwait.

=== 2012 ===
Hashem was acclaimed to be "best in the Middle East" at the Tekken Tag Tournament 2 Middle East Championship in Dubai. This allowed entry to the Electronic Sports World Cup 2012 Tekken Tag Tournament 2 in France.

=== 2015 ===
Hashem won the PLG Mortal Kombat Middle East Cup. In the same year, he was the first Arab player to participate in the Mortal Kombat X European Finals in Paris, where he finished second.

=== 2016 ===
Hashem was granted entry by the Power League Gaming PLG to participate at Evo 2016, where he finished second.

=== 2017 ===
Hashem participated in several Injustice 2 tournaments and finished 3rd in the Eleague Injustice 2 World Championship.

He was also awarded the "Best E-sports player for the year 2017" trophy by TRUE GAMING.

=== 2018 ===
In 2018 he competed in a variety of tournaments, including Viennality 2018, Tekken 7, and Injustice 2.

Hashem won the Intercontinental Championship, which allowed him to participate in the IPS for Injustice 2.

=== 2019 ===
Hashem won the 2019 Brazil Game Show of Mortal Kombat 11. Following the victory, Hashem was dignified by the King of Bahrain. Hashem was then ranked 3rd on the Mortal Kombat Pro Series overall leaderboard of 2019.

He also won the Insomnia Saudi Morta Kombat 11 tournament in that same year.

Hashem won second place after a close match at the Viennality-2019 tournament.

=== 2020 ===
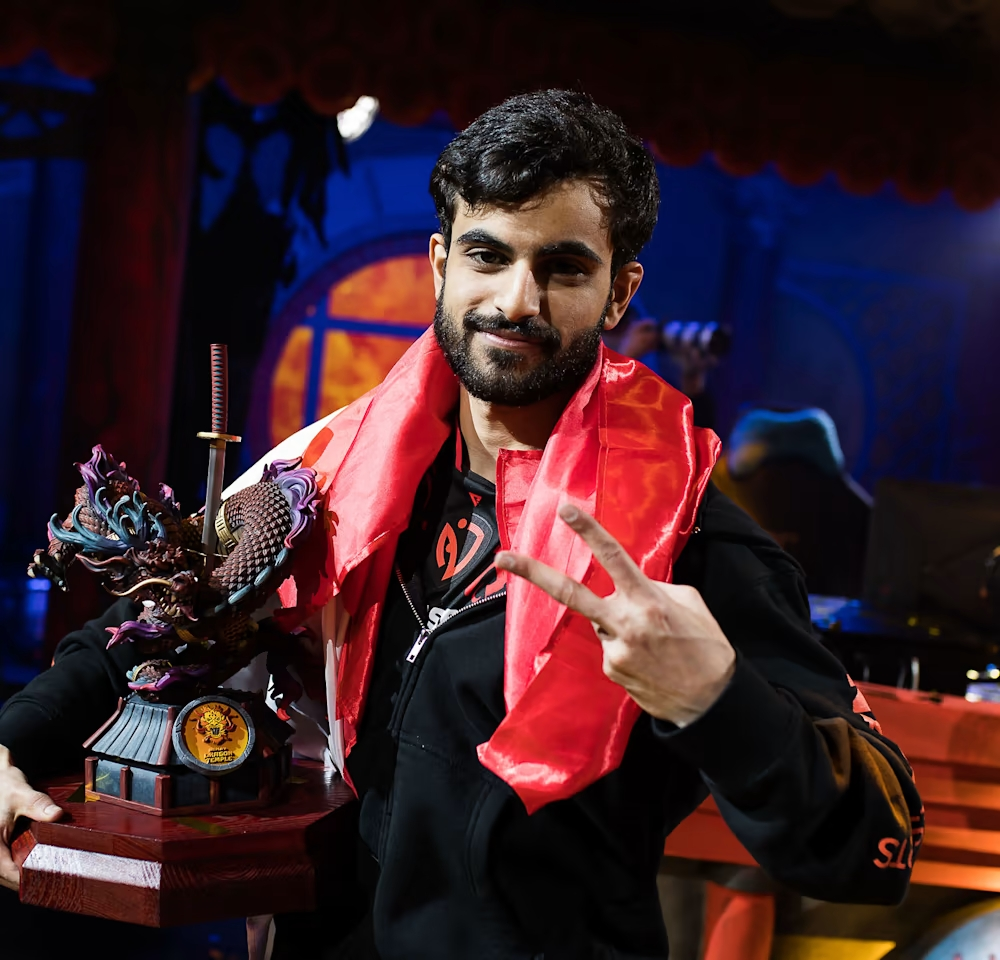
Tekken Master holding the WePlay Dragon Temple Season 1 cup

In 2020, Hashem won the Mortal Kombat players in the WePlay Dragon Temple event in Kyiv.

He dominated the tournament and went undefeated pretty much throughout.

=== 2021 ===
In 2021, Hashem continued winning and defended his championship but lost in the grand final, coming in second place.

At the finals of the online Mortal Kombat Pro Competition, he placed 1st, beating vWsym in the grand finals. Hashem was also invited to Saudi Arabia for the Mortal Kombat 11 tournament, called Rush, in October 2021 and placed 1st.

=== 2022 ===
Hashem was voted for and won the best e-sports player in sports and fighting games category provided by Talabat.

=== 2023 ===
In November 2023, Hashem traveled to France to play in the UFA (Ultimate Fighting Arena 2023) tournament for Mortal Kombat 1. There he placed the 1st.

=== 2024 ===
In January 2023, Hashem won the First MK1 Pro Kompetition Middle East Regional Qualifier. Then went on to win the second Middle East Regional Qualifier in February 2024.

In March, Hashem got 2nd place in the third MK1 Pro Kompetition Middle East Regional Qualifier. And finally, for the final Regional Qualifier, Hashem once again got 2nd place. In that same month as well, Hashem played in the Fuddruckers Tekken 7 tournament, winning it and getting 1st place.

In March, Hashem got 3rd place in the Saudi Fighting League Season 2 Major For Tekken 8.

In April, Hashem traveled to Japan to play in the 2024 JAPAN EVO. Getting the 7th place out of 1200+ entrants.

In June, he played in the GCCEsport Tekken 8 tournament, winning it and placing 1st place.

In August, Hashem got the 3rd place in the Arabian cup for Tekken 8, coming after KSA and Morocco

In September, he got second place in the Emirates Showdown 2024 for Tekken 8.

=== 2025 ===
In 2025, Hashem was able to reach the finals of Mortal Kombat Pro Kompetition 2025 which took place in Mexico. Later he also qualified for the Esports World Cup in Riyadh for Tekken 8. Making him the only player to qualify for both finals for MK1 and Tekken 8.

=== 2026 ===
Hashem qualified for the Esports World Cup in Paris for Tekken 8. He also made it to the top 8 of Combo Breaker, exiting the tournament in the 4th spot.
