= Isa bin Abdulrahman Al Hammadi =

H.E. Isa bin Abdulrahman Al Hammadi
- عيسى بن عبدالرحمن الحمادي
- In office 2014–2016
- Minister: Ministry of Information Affairs, Bahrain

Isa bin Abdulrahman Al Hammadi is the minister of Information Affairs of Bahrain. Prior to his new role, he served as the Executive Director of Communications and Political Affairs at the Court of the Crown Prince. In parallel to this role, Al Hammadi also served as the Executive Director of National Communications at the Bahrain Economic Development Board (EDB), a semi government entity responsible for attracting Foreign Direct Investment into the Kingdom.

== Career ==
Prior to the EDB, he served as the Director of Marketing and Awareness at the Bahrain eGovernment Authority (EGA). He was also a member of the senior management of the Bahrain Telecommunication Company (BATELCO).

During the years 2011 & 2013, Al Hammadi held the position of the official spokesperson and head of Bahrain's National Dialogue Media Centre. In addition to the above, he was also a board member of the Telecommunications Regulatory Authority (TRA) and the National Supreme Council for Tourism. Early in his career, he became a popular figure in the community having appeared on various TV and Radio programmes as a presenter.

== Education ==
Al Hammadi holds a master's degree in Business Administration and is a founding member of Bahrain Internet Society.
