= Shubar al-Sitri =

Shobbar Al-Sitri
- Title: Sayyid

Personal life
- Born: Bahrain
- Died: 1895 Shiraz, Qajar Empire
- Occupation: Shi'ite scholar, rebel leader

Religious life
- Religion: Islam

Sayyid Shubar ibn Ali ibn Mish'al al-Sitri al-Bahrani al-Ghurayfi (Arabic: السيد شبر بن علي بن مشعل الستري البحراني الغريفي) was a Bahraini cleric and rebel leader who attempted to overthrow Sheikh Isa ibn Ali Al Khalifa, Hakim of Bahrain in 1895.

== Coup attempt ==
Sayyid Shubar acquired weapons and mobilized men from al-Hasa, Saudi Arabia and areas in Bahrain to overthrow the Hakim, however the coup failed due to lack of support from Shi'a clerics.

The 19th century scholar Sheikh Ali bin Hasan al-Biladi says in his book Anwar al-Badrain that after the failed coup, al-Sitri attempted to revitalize the rebellion against Sheikh Isa through gaining foreign support. In order to achieve this, Al-Sitri met with the ruler of Persia, Nasser al-Din Shah Qajar, who assured him that he would be on his side as that country belongs to Persia. However, the Qajar Persian government was powerless to give aid at the time due to European colonization and the subsequent rise of semi-independent political entities throughout Iran. Thus, al-Sitri was inclined to meet with the ruler of Shiraz to support his venture of overthrowing the Hakim of Bahrain.

However, as the Bahraini government received news of al-Shirazi's correspondence with the Iranians, they bribed the ruler of Shiraz with gifts and money to co-opt him from a cooperation with Al-Sitri. So when al-Sitri went to Shiraz, the ruler of that area did not meet with him and did not look upon what he wanted to tell him. Sayyid Shubar died fourth months later in Shiraz.

== Aftermath of coup attempt ==
The failed coup d'état had bloody consequences, "many of the people of Bahrain were apparently killed in this rebellion". Numerous Bedouin tribes fled the bloodshed through migrating to Qatar (then under Ottoman hegemony), thus renouncing their status as subjects of the Sheikh of Bahrain. During this time period, the Ottomans were battling the Al Khalifas for control of Zubarah, as the Khalifas did not commit to vassalage under the Ottomans. This led to the Porte sending 400 Turkish troops in a warship to conquer Zubarah. The Ottomans then utilized the migrant Bedouin tribes from Bahrain to invade that island, with newly conquered Zubarah as their base for the invasion. The migrant tribes, "led by the Al Bin Ali and supported by the Ottomans" prepared to invade Bahrain in 1895 with a "large number" of boats, "armed and prepared for sea". The British repelled the invasion force before it took place, destroying or capturing many ships. The Bedouin tribes, led by the Al Bin Ali, subsequently sued for peace and the migrant tribes' threat to Bahrain neutralized.

== Works ==
He wrote some works on Islamic (Shi’ite) jurisprudence, creed and other Islamic topics, which include:

- Mi’rājut Tahqīq ilā Miāhajet Tasdīq. That work is on the topic of the principles of religion.
- Mohaddhabul Afhām fī Madārikel Ahkām.

== Legacy ==
A prominent member of Bahrain's royal family, Sheikh Ahmed ibn Muhammad Al Khalifa, scrutinized Bahrain's Shias in a disparaging poem deeply critical of the Shia community of Bahrain and their role in the 1990s uprising. In the poem directed to current Royal Court chief Khalid ibn Ahmed, Sheikh Ahmad ibn Muhammad makes mention of Shubar al-Sitri twice. First, he poses an inquisitive first line in the poem asking "What is wrong with sons of Shubbar and Marhoon? Their voices are loud with curses". In another line, he describes Bahrain Shias as "the sons of Shubbar from whom we do not see any aid. And our thoughts regarding them are forever disappointed".
