= Thuraya AlArrayed =

Arabic-language Saudi poet and writer (born 1948)

Thuraya AlArrayed ثريا العريض
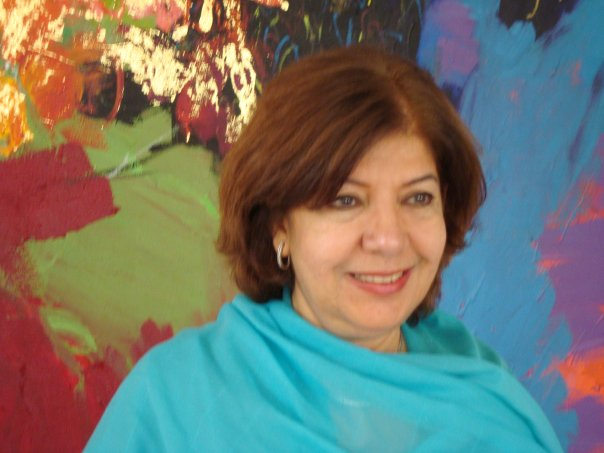
- Born: Thuraya Ibrahem AlArrayed; June , 1948; Manama, Bahrain
- Occupations: Poet, writer
- Spouse: Abdullah Essa AlDabaq
- Writing career
- Years active: 1980–present

Thuraya AlArrayed (Arabic: ثريا العريض) is an Arabic language Saudi poet and writer. She was born in 1948. She received a bachelor's degree from the College of Beirut, in 1966, an MBA from the American University of Beirut in 1969 and a PhD from the University of North Carolina, United States General in 1975.

== About her life ==
AlArrayed worked in several areas, including the Ministry of Education in Bahrain between 1967 and 1969. She joined the Saudi Arabian Oil Company (Aramco), the largest oil company in the world, in 1980. Today, she works as a consultant for planning.

== Work and education ==
Education

- University of North Carolina at Chapel Hill
- PhD, Ed planning and Admin, 1975
- American University of Beirut
- MA, ED Admin, 1969
- Bahrain Highschool for girls 1966

== Professional Summary ==
- Phd in Educational planning and administration from UNC Chapel Hill.
- Writer and poet
- Daily columnist in alWatan News Paper
- Planning consultant
- Advisory board member of Prince Sultan Fund for small business for women
- Member of IPRA Gulf Chapter
- Member of Advisory Board of Arab Thought Foundation
- President of Saudi Society for Information and Communication. Eastern Province branch
- Member of Saudi Human Rights Society
