= Infaq =

Arabic word meaning spending or disbursement

Infāq (Arabic: إنفاق) is an Arabic word meaning "spending, disbursement;" but also carries the sense of doing so simply to please God without asking for any favor or hoping for a return.

The word ʾinfāq is mentioned once in the Qurʾān in Q17:100. The imperative form of the verb (ʾanfiqū) (أَنفِقُوا) appears 18 times in the Qurʾān Similar wording is found at Q8:3; Q14:31; Q22:35; Q28:54; Q32:16.

The word ʾinfāq shares the same triliteral root with the word nifāq (ن ف ق, nūn fā qāf), meaning hypocrisy.

Infāq is different from zakat, which is obligatory on Muslims, or sadaqah, which is charity for obtaining specific return or protection from some adverse event.
