= Tariq Al-Ali =

Kuwaiti actor (born 1966)

Tariq Al-Ali طارق العلي
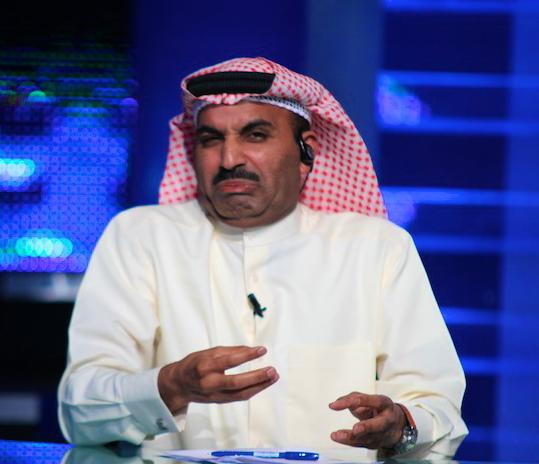
- Born: Tariq Hmod Al-Ali; 18 January 1966 (age 60); Jahra, Kuwait
- Occupations: Comedian, actor, TV host
- Years active: 1983–present

Tariq Al-Ali (Arabic: طارق العلي) (born January 18, 1966) is a Kuwaiti comedian and actor.

== Biography ==
Al-Ali lost his father before his birth. He started acting in 1983 and has participated in many theatrical plays, films and TV series.

He is married, and has four children.
