= Shaila Sabt =

Bahraini actress, model and beauty pageant titleholder of Indian descent

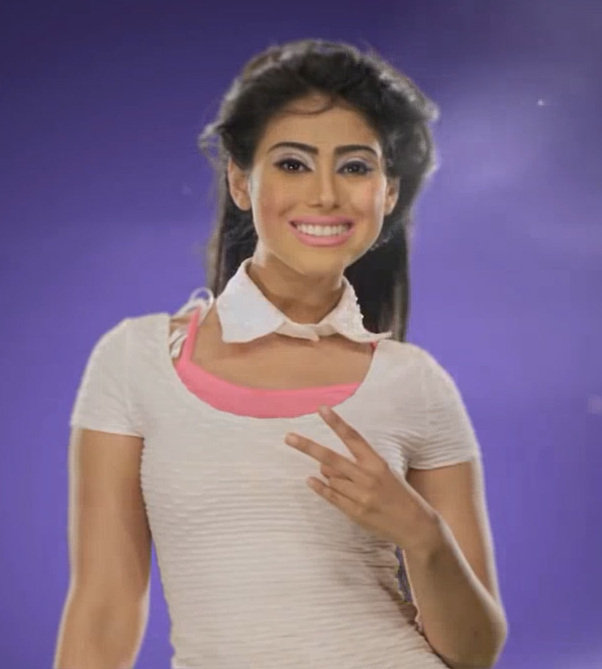
- Born: Shaila Mohammed Salem Sabt; August 19, 1989 (age 37); Muharraq, Bahrain

Shaila Sabt (Arabic: شيلاء سبت) (born August 19, 1989, Muharraq, Bahrain) is a Bahraini actress, model and beauty pageant titleholder who was crowned Bahrain Top Model 2010.

== Biography ==
Sabt graduated from New York Institute of Technology with a major in human resource management. She is from a performing family, including her actress mother Fatima Ismail and actress sisters Shaima, Shatha, and Abrar. Her first role was as a bit part as a child alongside Shaima in the Saudi series Ailat Abu Ruwaished in 1998, but she did not return to acting until much later. After winning Miss Bahrain in 2010, she returned to acting the following year and appeared in many television and theatrical works.

== Career ==
=== Television series ===
Filmography
Year	Series	Role
1998	Ailat Abu Ruwaished	Child
2011	The Rich and the Miser	Norah
2012	University Girls	Danah
2012	Leaves of Love 2	
2013	Female Student Housing	Nawal
2013	The Farewell	
2013	Jar Al-Qamar	Example
2013	Al-Mahjoola	
2013	Sultana	
2013	Soktom Boktom 4	
2013	Ya Min Hawahu	
2014	Kheff Aleina	
2014	Tahaluf Alsabar	
2014	Hob fil Arba'in	
2014	WIFI 3	Example
2014	Love, But	
2014	Inside the House	
2015	Selfie	
2015	Saad wa Khwato	
2016	The Sisters-in-Law	Myad
2016	Oud Akhdar	Hanin
2016	Found My Soul	
2016	Harim Aboy	Khairiah
2017	Kalus	
2017	Tired of Pleasing You	
2017	The Hardest Decision	
2018	صيف بارد	Jasmine
2018	El-Taseea Min Febrayer	Faid
2019	25 Daqiqa	Zahia
2019	Omniat Ba'eda	Dalal
2019	W Ma Adrak Ma Omi	Hind
2020	Misahat Khalia	Sarah
2020	Raha Al'ayam	Norah
2020	Kasrat Thahar	
2020	قرقاشة 2	
2020	Kunna Ams	Example
2020	Sawaha El-Bakht	Sepia
2020	Addani Al Ayb	Shams

=== Theatre ===
Acting career
Year	Play
2011	غريب زنقة زنقة
2012	يمقن إي يمقن لآ
2013	Fun Run World
2015	Once Upon a Time
2018	The King

=== Film ===
Filmography
Year	Film
2018	Nashi and Mira

=== Video Clip ===
In 2021, she appeared in a video clip with the Yemini musician Fuad Abdulwahad titled "Ghann" (lit. Sing).
