= 1937 Qatari–Bahraini conflict =

Territorial dispute between Qatar and Bahrain in 1937

- Part of Territorial disputes in the Persian Gulf
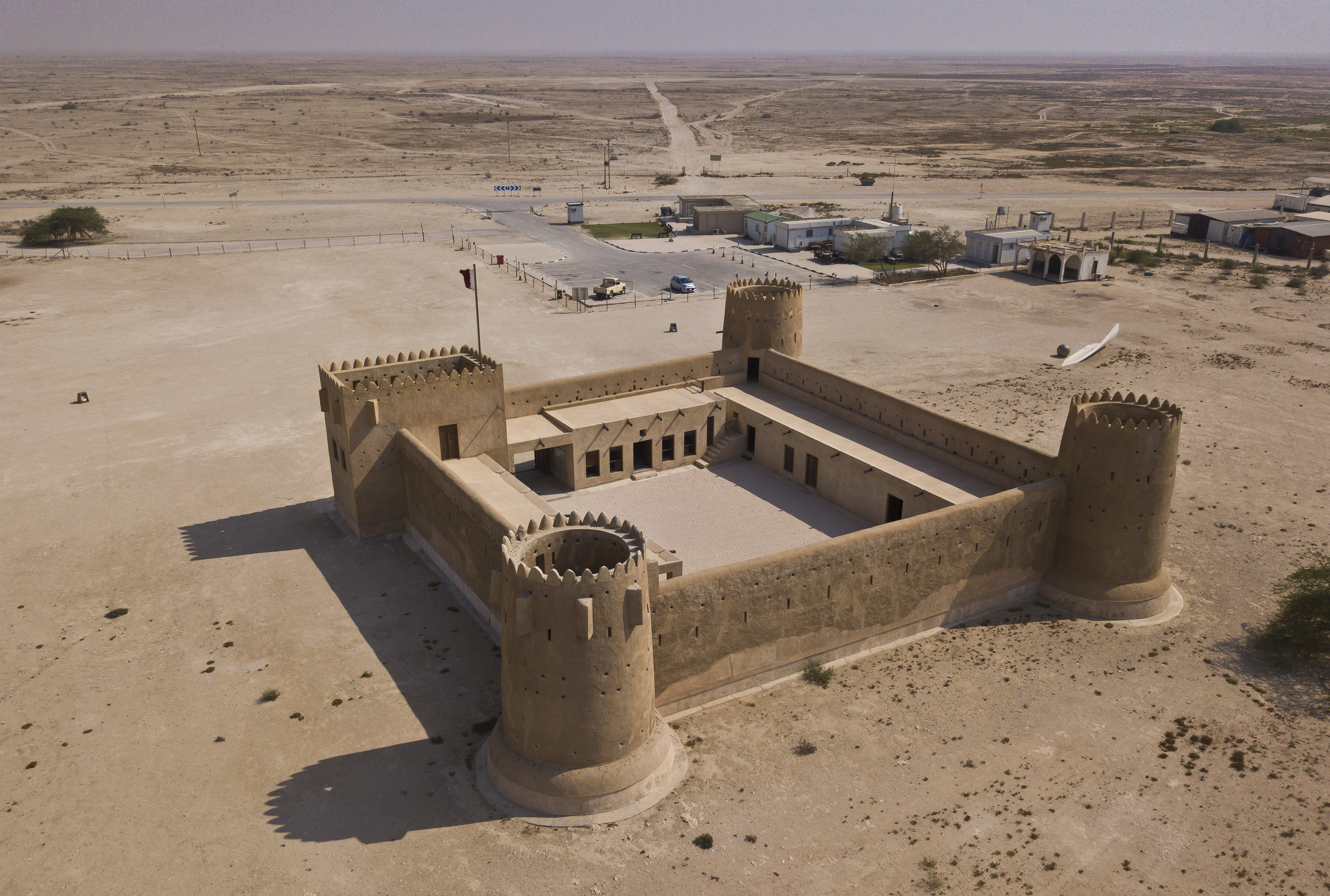
- Zubarah Fort, built in 1938 following the conflict
Date	1 July 1937
Location	Zubarah, northwestern Qatar
Result	Qatari victory over Bahraini-backed Al Naim tribe Bahraini embargo imposed on Qatar
Territorial changes	Qatari consolidation of control over Zubarah

Belligerents
Qatar	Bahrain (support for Al Naim tribe)

Commanders and leaders
Sheikh Abdullah bin Jassim Al Thani	Sheikh Hamad bin Isa Al Khalifa; Sheikh Rashid bin Mohammed Al Jabor (Al Jabor faction of Al Naim tribe)

Strength
c. 3,000 fighters (Ramazin faction of Al Naim tribe, Al Murrah, and Bani Hajer tribes)	c. 1,000 fighters (Al Jabor faction of Al Naim tribe, Al Kubaisi, and Al Kaaban tribes, some armed support from Bahrain)

Casualties and losses
Unknown	~100 killed

The 1937 Qatari–Bahraini conflict was a territorial dispute between the rulers of Qatar and Bahrain over the coastal town of Zubarah, in northwestern Qatar. The confrontation, which took place in July 1937, marked one of the most significant interwar border clashes in the Persian Gulf during the early oil concession era. Its outcome catalyzed the building of the modern Fort of Zubarah and established new practices of border control between the two sheikhdoms.

== Background ==
Zubarah was once a thriving pearling and trading center on Qatar's northwest coast, closely connected to Bahrain through tribal and commercial ties. The Al Khalifa family, who had settled in Zubarah in the 18th century, later seized Bahrain from the Persians in 1783 and continued to view the town as part of their sphere of influence. By the 19th century, however, the Al Thani family had emerged as the leading power on the Qatari Peninsula, aided by Ottoman recognition in the 1870s and British treaties in 1868 and 1916 that affirmed their autonomy. Despite these developments, sovereignty over Zubarah remained contested, with the semi-nomadic Al Naim tribe maintaining seasonal residence there and shifting loyalties between both rulers.

== Conflict ==
=== Prelude ===
The discovery of oil in Bahrain in 1932 heightened competition between British and American companies in the Persian Gulf. In 1935, Sheikh Abdullah bin Jassim Al Thani of Qatar signed an agreement granting the Anglo-Persian Oil Company exclusive exploration rights, giving Zubarah renewed importance. Economic decline from the collapse of the pearling industry further intensified regional tensions.

In March 1937, Sheikh Abdullah visited Zubarah, accompanied by agents of Petroleum Concessions Qatar Limited. Soon after, he imposed customs duties on goods arriving from Bahrain and stationed guards along the coast. These measures disrupted longstanding patterns of free movement and challenged Bahraini influence in the area. At the same time, a dispute within the Al Naim tribe over marriage and leadership split its members, with one faction, the Al Ramazin, siding with Qatar and the Al Jabor faction with Bahrain.

Sheikh Abdullah's enforcement of duties deepened this division and provoked protests from tribal leader Rashid bin Mohammed Al Jabor, who turned to the Bahraini ruler Sheikh Hamad bin Isa Al Khalifa for support.

According to letters relayed by the British political agent in Manama, the Bahraini Sheikh, Hamad bin Isa, attempted to negotiate support on behalf of Rashid bin Mohammed's faction, but was rebuffed by the political agent who suggested that Rashid instead take up his grievances with the Qatari Emir. Rashid responded by claiming that the Qatari Emir had burned down his faction's villages and huts, forcing him to evacuate the Zubarah region to Umm Al Maa, however; the British were steadfast in their stance of not interfering in the local affairs of Qatar.

=== Battle ===
Tensions escalated when Bahraini flags were raised in Zubarah and guards were dispatched from the island. Sheikh Abdullah viewed this as a direct provocation and prepared for military action. British officials attempted to mediate, but negotiations broke down in June 1937. On 1 July, Qatari forces, numbering approximately 3,000 troops equipped with vehicles and artillery, attacked Rashid's Al Naim followers, who were estimated at 1,000 troops, near Zubarah. After several hours of fighting, the Al Naim were defeated with heavy casualties. Many survivors fled across the sea to Bahrain, while others pledged allegiance to Qatar.

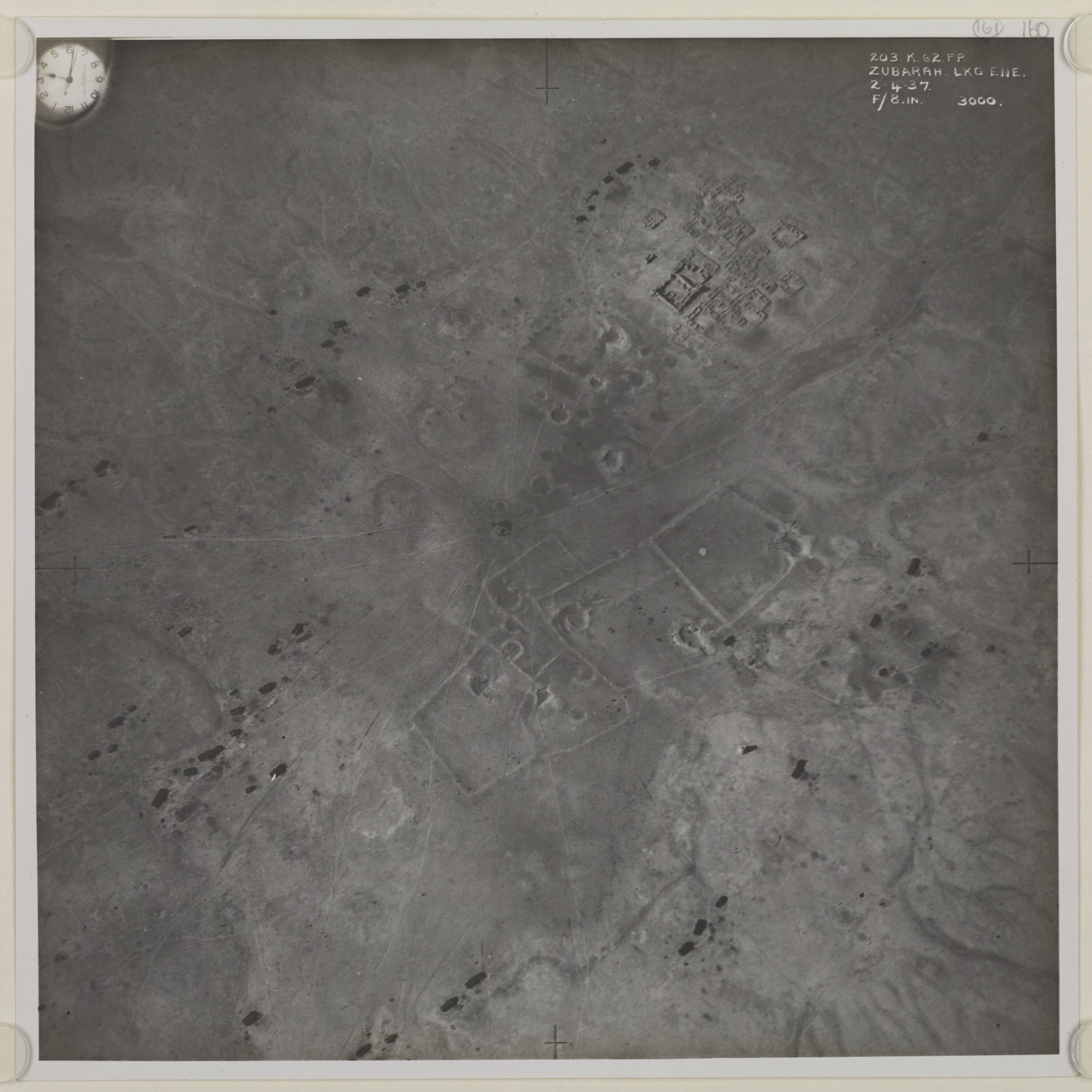
An aerial photograph of Zubarah taken by the British in 1937

According to the British political agent, Rashid bin Jabor relayed the following account:

"We had at Ath Thaqab in the Qasar [fort] 40 armed men. A messenger came from them saying that they were fearful and tnat they wanted camels and water be sent to them so that they should ride and come to us. We sent 26 men mounted on camels and four horsemen as guards in order to bring them. When they reached near the Qasar, Shaikh Abdullah's army appeared. They were in cars and on horses (4 cars and about 30 horsemen) and more than 250 camel riders. When our people saw Shaikh Abdullah's followers, they returned and did not go to the Qasar. On their return the cars and the horsemen overtook them so they were obliged to make their camels kneel down. Sheikh Abdullah's men fired on

them and killed four men, among them was my brother Hamad bin Muhammad. They also killed 4 horses, wounded three men and killed 24 camels. Then they captured the Qasar and demolished it. They also occupied the towns (Freiha, Arish, Akhdai, Qasr al Thaghab and Al Khuwayr, took away all the foodstuff and plundered those who were from our followers, such as Al Akbesah [Al Kubaisi] and Bu Ka'aban [Al Kaaban], carrying away their clothes, mattings, pots, cows, donkeys and the hair tents. They also took away the sails and the ropes of the boats.

Afterwards Shaikh Abdullh marched and halted near Morair fort which belongs to Zubarah. One of the Arabs (Haza' bin Khalil, Shaikh Hamad's man) wrote asking him (Shaikh Abdullah) to refrain from shedding the blood of the Muslims and also from demanding anything from them. He (Shaikh Abdullah) then sent a letter with his brother saying that he wanted to see me. I interviewed him because our food stuff had exhausted and the way was cut as Shaikh Abdullah stood between us and Bahrain. When I went to him in the camp Shaikh Abdullah told me that he would not give us security unless we have surrendered our arms. We surrendered our arms as we were forced by hunger to do so and because we did not do anything as ordered by the Political Agent. Then they themselves wrote a document and took my seal and sealed it. It ran as follows: "That as long as I am residing in Qatar I should not do anything against Shaikh Abdullah and should not fight with him and if I want to leave Qatar and go to any other place he will not prevent me and my followers and all connected to me such as property etc. to do so." The property taken away from us by Shaikh Abdullah:–

What I handed over personally to Muhammad bin Abaul Latif bin Mani', 92 rifles. Taken from the people of Thaghab 40 rifles, from Muhammad al Nafaihi 10 rifles, from Bu Kawwarah 12 rifles, from Ka'aban 11 rifles, from Haza' bin Khalil 9 rifles. Also taken 40 camels, 120 sheep, 100 donkeys. 10 camels were taken away by Bedouins. Shaikh Abdullah sent horsemen to pursue the Bedouins and restore them, but they have not yet returned. These ten camels were taken away by Bedouins after the peace."

Contemporary Arab news media covered the incident, including Beirut-based Al Nida who ran the headline "War declared between two Arabian States" on 23 July, 1937.

== Aftermath ==
Following the battle, Sheikh Hamad imposed an embargo on Qatar, restricting trade and raising tariffs on supplies bound for the peninsula. This blockade, which lasted into the 1940s, deepened Qatar's economic hardship at a time of scarcity. The conflict also led to the further desertion of Zubarah after a period of abandonment from the late 19th to early 20th century. In 1938 Sheikh Abdullah consolidated his control by constructing the Fort of Zubarah, which served as a base for customs and border patrols. The fort, built partially from the ruins of Qal'at Murair, symbolized Qatari sovereignty and countered Bahraini territorial claims to Zubarah's historic ruins, particularly Qal'at Murair.

British officials ultimately recognized Qatari authority over Zubarah but sought to limit further escalation by urging both rulers to refrain from new construction or development in the area. Despite these efforts, the conflict strained relations between Qatar and Bahrain. Bahraini claims to Zubarah persisted throughout the 20th century and resurfaced in international arbitration before the International Court of Justice, which ruled in Qatar's favor in 2001.

== See also ==
- Bahrain–Qatar relations
- Fasht Dibal conflict
- History of Qatar
