= Bahrain–Qatar relations =

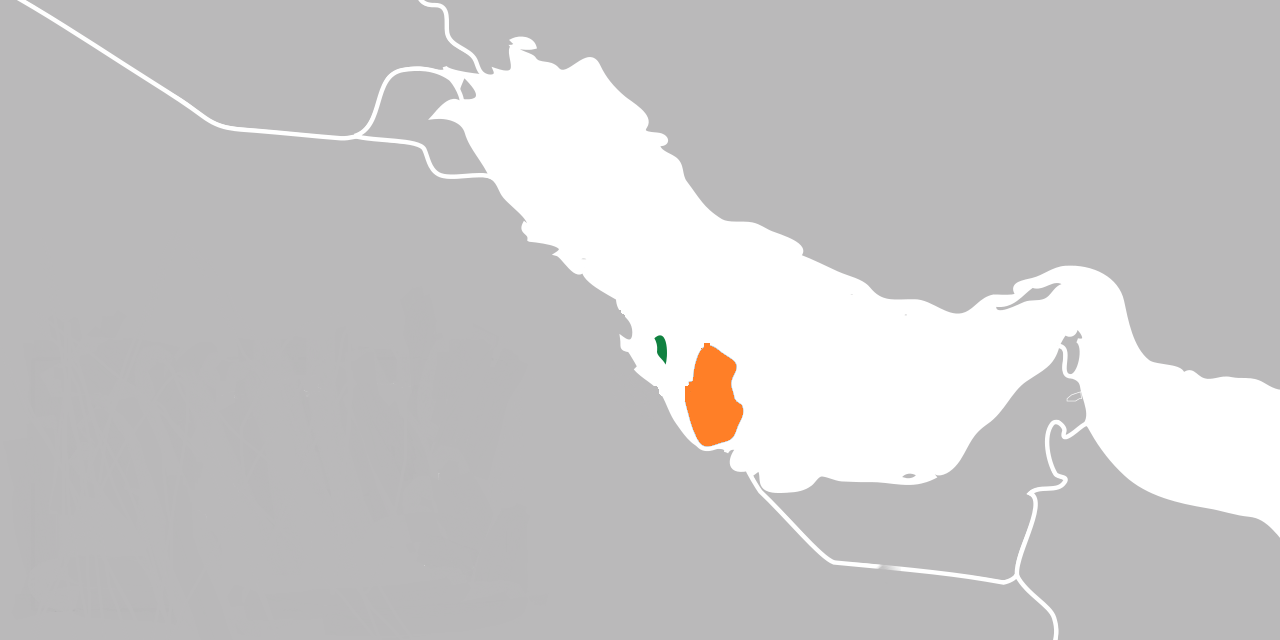

- Bahrain: Qatar

Bilateral relations between the State of Qatar and the Kingdom of Bahrain first began in 1971, when both countries gained independence from the United Kingdom. The two are often considered "sister nations", sharing close cultural and historical ties.

Despite their cultural and historical ties, the two have historically had fraught relations due to several territorial and diplomatic disputes.

On 5 June 2017, Bahrain along with three other Arab nations officially cut diplomatic ties with Qatar, giving the country's diplomats 48 hours to leave, and signaling the start of the Qatar diplomatic crisis. On 13 April 2023, Bahrain and Qatar officially resumed their diplomatic relations, two years after the blockade on the latter was resolved.

== History ==
=== Before the modern era ===
Both countries had a closely shared history prior to their emergence as distinct political entities. Qatar was considered to have been a part of the Bahrain-centered Dilmun civilisation's trade network from the 4th to 2nd millennium BCE, as evidenced by archaeological finds on Al Khor Island.

From the 4th to 9th centuries, both Bahrain and Qatar were part of the Syriac-speaking Beth Qatraye region, known for its Nestorian Christian authors, such as Isaac of Nineveh (also known as Isaac Qaṭraya), whose corpus remains one of the most widespread translated Syriac texts in existence.

According to Islamic tradition, Muhammad sent a Muslim envoy named Al-Ala'a Al-Hadrami to Munzir ibn Sawa Al-Tamimi, a ruler in Eastern Arabia, in 628, requesting that he and his people accept Islam. Thereafter, most of Qatar and Bahrain's inhabitants converted to Islam, while others retained their religions and paid jizya, a tax for non-Muslims.

=== Al Khalifa migration to Zubarah ===
In the mid-18th century, the current ruling family of Bahrain – House of Khalifa – migrated from Kuwait to Qatar, where they established a thriving town in Zubarah. Following the Bani Utbah invasion of Bahrain in 1783, in which Zubarah-based tribes conquered the Bahrain islands from the Persians, the Al Khalifa assumed control of both Bahrain and Zubarah, with Ahmed bin Muhammad bin Khalifa ruling from the latter until his death in 1796. His heirs would rule from Bahrain, where they continued to exert authority over mainland Qatar.

=== 19th century ===
Into the 19th century, the Al Khalifa of Bahrain continued to maintain an unsteady suzerainty over Qatar. Their rule over Qatar was challenged by the Emirate of Nejd in the Battle of Mesaimeer in 1853, where Qatari forces defected to the Wahhabis after Bahrain refused to render aid in preventing the invasion of Qatar. However, the Wahhabis ceded back suzerainty of Qatar to Bahrain following an agreement months later.

Following the Qatari–Bahraini War in 1868, Qatar was recognized as a distinct political entity by the British, with Mohammed bin Thani being recognized as its ruler. However, due to the payment of taxes by several tribes on Qatar's mainland to Bahrain's emir, the Bahrainis continued to view Qatar as its dominion. It was not until the 1916 Anglo–Qatari treaty, which saw Qatar incorporated as a protectorate of the United Kingdom, that Bahraini claims of jurisdiction over Qatar ceased.

=== 20th century ===
In 1968, after the British announced their intention to withdraw from the Persian Gulf region, its former protectorates, which included Qatar and Bahrain in addition to the Trucial States, considered forming a union known as the Federation of Arab Emirates. However, in 1971, both Qatar and Bahrain withdrew from the union, instead opting to declare independence.

Both were among the six countries who formed the Gulf Cooperation Council (GCC) in 1981 for diplomatic and economic cooperation.

== Territorial disputes ==
Starting in 1936, Qatar and Bahrain were involved in territorial disputes over the Hawar Islands, Fasht Al Azm, Fasht Dibal, Qit'at Jaradah, and Zubarah. In 1996, Bahrain boycotted the GCC summit hosted in Qatar, claiming that the last summit held in Qatar in 1990 was used as a platform to reiterate their territorial claims to the other GCC states. They also cited the 1986 Qatari incursion in Fasht Dibal as a reason for not attending.

At a GCC meeting in 1990, it was proposed by Qatar that the dispute be settled by the International Court of Justice (ICJ), which was met with agreement from Bahrain. This proposal was fraught with controversies, however, as in 1991, Qatar sought to undermine Bahrain's claims by requesting a unilateral agreement from the ICJ which would have seen all of Qatar's territorial claims affirmed. Negotiations persisted, however, and the disputes were resolved by the ICJ on 16 March 2001, giving Bahrain the Hawar Islands (excluding the Janan Island), Qit'at Jaradah, and Fasht Al Azm, with Qatar receiving Zubarah, Fasht Dibal, and the Janan Island.

=== Zubarah ===
From the 19th century onward, the two countries periodically disputed the ownership of Zubarah, a town on the north-west coast of Qatar. A large-scale conflict between the two broke out in 1937. Tensions were heightened in 1938 after Qatar constructed Zubarah Fort in the town; an act which was deemed illegal by Bahrain. A settlement was reached in 1944 during a meeting mediated by the Saudis, in which Qatar recognized Bahrain's customary rights, such as grazing, and visiting with no formalities necessary. However, this accord was broken shortly after, following the construction of another fort by Qatar.

In 1953, Bahrain reiterated its claims over Zubarah when it sent a party of students and teachers to Zubarah who proceeded to write 'Bahrain' on the walls of Zubarah Fort. Furthermore, the Bahrain Education Department published maps which alleged Bahraini sovereignty over the entire north-west coast of the peninsula. Qatar responded by stationing troops in the fort in 1954. The case was resolved in Qatar's favor by the ICJ in 2001.

=== Hawar Islands ===
Both countries laid claim to the chain of islands known as Hawar Islands, located a short distance off the western Qatari coast. In January 1976, during an interview with a Bahraini newspaper, Qatari foreign minister Suhaim bin Hamad Al Thani minimized the conflict over Hawar in the interests of preserving cordial relations between the two. However, upon a statement by the Bahraini foreign minister which implied there was no dispute due to Bahrain's claims being recognized by the international community, Suhaim bin Hamad strongly rebuffed his claims, leading to further strained relations.

=== Fasht Dibal ===
A dispute arose over Fasht Dibal in 1985 after Bahrain began constructing fortifications on the island. Qatar considered the construction to be a violation of an existing agreement made in 1978. In April 1986, Qatari troops arrived on the island via helicopter and declared it a "restricted zone". They seized several Bahraini officials and 29 construction workers hired by the Dutch contracting company Ballast Nedam. On 12 May 1986, following protests by the Netherlands and mediation by several GCC member states, Bahrain and Qatar reached a settlement, after which the foreign workers were released. Qatari troops evacuated the island on 15 June. The island was later awarded to Qatar in the aftermath of the 2001 ICJ case.

== Economic relations ==
To improve economic relations and bilateral trade, the two established a joint economic council in 1972.

It was reported that in 2005, Bahrain was denied the rights to extend an existing Qatari gas pipeline to the kingdom, despite their proposal to purchase gas from Qatar at market prices. The main reason for the refusal was political enmity resulting from the earlier territorial disputes between the two countries.

Bahrain is one of the top sources of tourists to Qatar. In 2024, Bahraini tourists constituted the third-largest group of tourists to Qatar at 171,000 visitors, being surpassed only by visitors from Saudi Arabia and India.

=== Qatar–Bahrain Causeway ===
Following the establishment of a joint economic council in 1972, Qatar suggested constructing a causeway between the two countries, which would be bankrolled by the Qatari government, to facilitate travel. However, this was rejected by Bahrain due to its several territorial disputes with Qatar.

The Qatar–Bahrain Causeway was reportedly approved for construction on 28 February 2005, to link Bahrain near Manama to northwest Qatar near Zubarah as the longest fixed link in the world.

Since its announcement, it has faced numerous delays. The Bahrain-Qatari Follow-up Committee held its fourth meeting on the matter in Manama in February 2024, where it was agreed that the board of directors would be restructured.

== Political disputes ==
=== 1987 charge of espionage ===
In 1987, the Bahraini government alleged that Qatar recruited a Bahraini national with military connections for espionage purposes. The accused man was promptly arrested and sentenced to 10 years imprisonment, but was released in 1993.

=== 1988 charges of espionage ===
In 1988, the Bahraini leadership announced that it had arrested two members of the Ministry of Interior who were accused of colluding with the Qatari government. The accused were convicted of sharing confidential military information with Qatari operatives and were sentenced to five years each.

=== 1991 border violations ===
In July 1991, it was reported that Qatari navy vessels encroached on Bahraini naval space. This was followed by accounts of Bahraini jets violating Qatar's airspace. The matter was referred to the ICJ.

=== 1996 arrest of Qatari citizens ===
In October 1996, two Qatari citizens, Salwa Fakhri and Fahad Al Baker, were arrested on charges of espionage in Bahrain. During the trial, it was purported that Qatar had been involved in a prior spying mission which was uncovered by Bahraini authorities in 1987. They were sentenced to 3 years imprisonment; however, an Amiri pardon saw them released to Qatar in December 1996.

=== 1996 charge of espionage ===
In 1996, the Bahraini government arrested a member of the records' section of the Bahrain Defence Force for charges of collusion with Qatari authorities. The man, who had familial connections in Qatar, was accused of sharing confidential military information with the Qatar State Security.

=== 1997 defection of Nasser Al Khalifa ===
In January 1997, a member of Bahrain's ruling family, Nasser Al Khalifa, defected to Qatar in a highly publicized incident in which he flew a Bahraini military helicopter to the Qatari capital of Doha.

=== Al Jazeera documentary ===
In 2011, Qatari media organization Al Jazeera released a documentary on the humans rights abuses committed by Bahraini authorities during the 2011 Bahraini uprising. This drew condemnation from Bahrain's government, with MP Khamis Al-Rumaihi accusing Qatar of attempting to "foment dissent" within Bahrain.

=== Naturalisation controversy ===
In 2014, Bahrain accused Qatar of offering certain Bahraini families Qatari citizenship in exchange for dropping their Bahraini citizenship. It was reported that Qatar was targeting Sunni citizens, a threat to Bahrain's demographics as the majority of the population is Shia while the ruling family is Sunni. Undersecretary of Nationality, Passport and Residence Affairs of Bahrain, Sheikh Rashid bin Khalifa Al Khalifa, was quoted as saying, "We are confident that Qatar, a brotherly neighbour with Bahrain, will reconsider its position on this matter because naturalising Bahrainis negatively affects the security situation and the high national interests of Bahrain." He also stated that being a citizen of a GCC country gave citizens of one country the right to work, own property, and move between the other member countries, thus switching nationalities would not be necessary. Bahrain also claimed that it was a violation of an agreement of non-interference, signed on 17 April 2014, in the internal affairs of GCC member states.

On 13 August 2014, Qatar pledged to stop offering GCC nationals Qatari citizenship during a meeting of GCC foreign ministers in Jeddah. Despite this, Bahrain's interior minister threatened action against Qatar and claimed that they were still engaging in these activities. It was claimed that Qatar had naturalised hundreds of Bahrainis and as a result, Bahrain imposed fines on any Bahraini that accepted citizenship. Qatar's Director General of Public Security of the Interior Ministry called the quote "inaccurate" and argued that Qatar was only attempting to naturalise citizens of Qatari origin.

=== 2014 ambassador controversy ===
On 5 March 2014, Bahrain, Saudi Arabia, and the United Arab Emirates announced the withdrawal of their ambassadors from Qatar, alleging that Qatar had failed to fully implement a security agreement signed by the Gulf Cooperation Council (GCC) states. The agreement included commitments to refrain from interfering in the internal affairs of other GCC members and to avoid supporting groups or individuals perceived as threats to their security and stability. Qatari officials attributed the diplomatic rift to divergent foreign policy positions, particularly Qatar’s support for groups such as the Muslim Brotherhood and its opposition to the 2013 Egyptian coup d'état, which led to the establishment of a military-backed government under Abdel Fattah el-Sisi. On 16 November, it was reported that Bahrain, Saudi Arabia, and the UAE were returning their ambassadors to Qatar following an emergency meeting in Riyadh, stating that they had reached an understanding.

=== 2017–2021 Qatar diplomatic crisis ===
In June 2017, Bahrain, alongside Saudi Arabia, the United Arab Emirates, and Egypt, severed diplomatic ties with Qatar in what became known as the Qatar diplomatic crisis, accusing it of supporting terrorism and interfering in their internal affairs. Bahrain imposed a series of measures, including closing its airspace and territorial waters to Qatari planes and ships, barring its citizens from traveling to or residing in Qatar, expelling Qatari diplomats and restricting trade and travel links. The rift persisted for over three years until a reconciliation agreement was reached in January 2021 as part of the Al-Ula Declaration. In April 2023, Bahrain had restored diplomatic ties with Qatar.

== Resident diplomatic missions ==
- Bahrain has an embassy in Doha.
- Qatar has an embassy in Manama.

== See also ==
- Foreign relations of Bahrain
- Foreign relations of Qatar
- Qatari–Bahraini War
- Qatar diplomatic crisis
