= Low-tide elevation =

Natural landform exposed at low tide and submerged at high tide

A low-tide elevation is a naturally formed area of land surrounded by water that is exposed at low tide but submerged at high tide. The United Nations Convention on the Law of the Sea (UNCLOS) distinguishes these features from islands, which remain above water at high tide.

== Legal status ==
Under Article 13 of UNCLOS, a low-tide elevation's low-water line may serve as a baseline for measuring the territorial sea if at least part of its low-water line lies within the breadth of the territorial sea measured from the mainland or an island. A feature lying entirely beyond that distance has no territorial sea of its own. The distance requirement cannot be met simply by measuring from another low-tide elevation that qualifies as a baseline. UNCLOS permits a territorial sea up to 12 nautical miles (22 km; 14 mi) wide.

Article 7(4) generally excludes low-tide elevations as endpoints for straight baselines. Exceptions apply where a lighthouse or similar installation built on the elevation remains permanently above sea level, or where the use of such baselines has received general international recognition.

According to the Asia Maritime Transparency Initiative of the Center for Strategic and International Studies, "If an LTE (low-tide elevation) is located within maritime zones of a littoral state, such as territorial sea, exclusive economic zone, and continental shelf, it automatically belongs to that state."

Land reclamation does not give a low-tide elevation the maritime entitlements of a natural island. Artificial enlargement can, however, make it harder to establish whether a feature originally remained above water at high tide.

== Examples in international disputes ==
In Qatar v. Bahrain (2001), the International Court of Justice considered whether Qit'at Jaradah was an island or a low-tide elevation. Although nautical charts depicted it as a low-tide elevation, the court assessed other evidence and found that it qualified as an island.

In the 2016 South China Sea Arbitration, the tribunal classified Second Thomas Shoal as a low-tide elevation and found that it lay within the Philippines' exclusive economic zone.

== Sources ==
- Llanos, Hugo Ignacio (2002-09-01). "Low-Tide Elevations: Reassessing Their Impact on Maritime Delimination". Pace International Law Review. 14 (2): 255. doi:10.58948/2331-3536.1197. ISSN 2331-3536.

== See also ==
- Territorial waters
- Exclusive economic zone
- Continental shelf
- International waters
- United Nations Convention on the Law of the Sea
