= Ath Thaqab =

Qalaat al Thaqab قلعة الثقاب Ath Thaqab
- Abandoned village
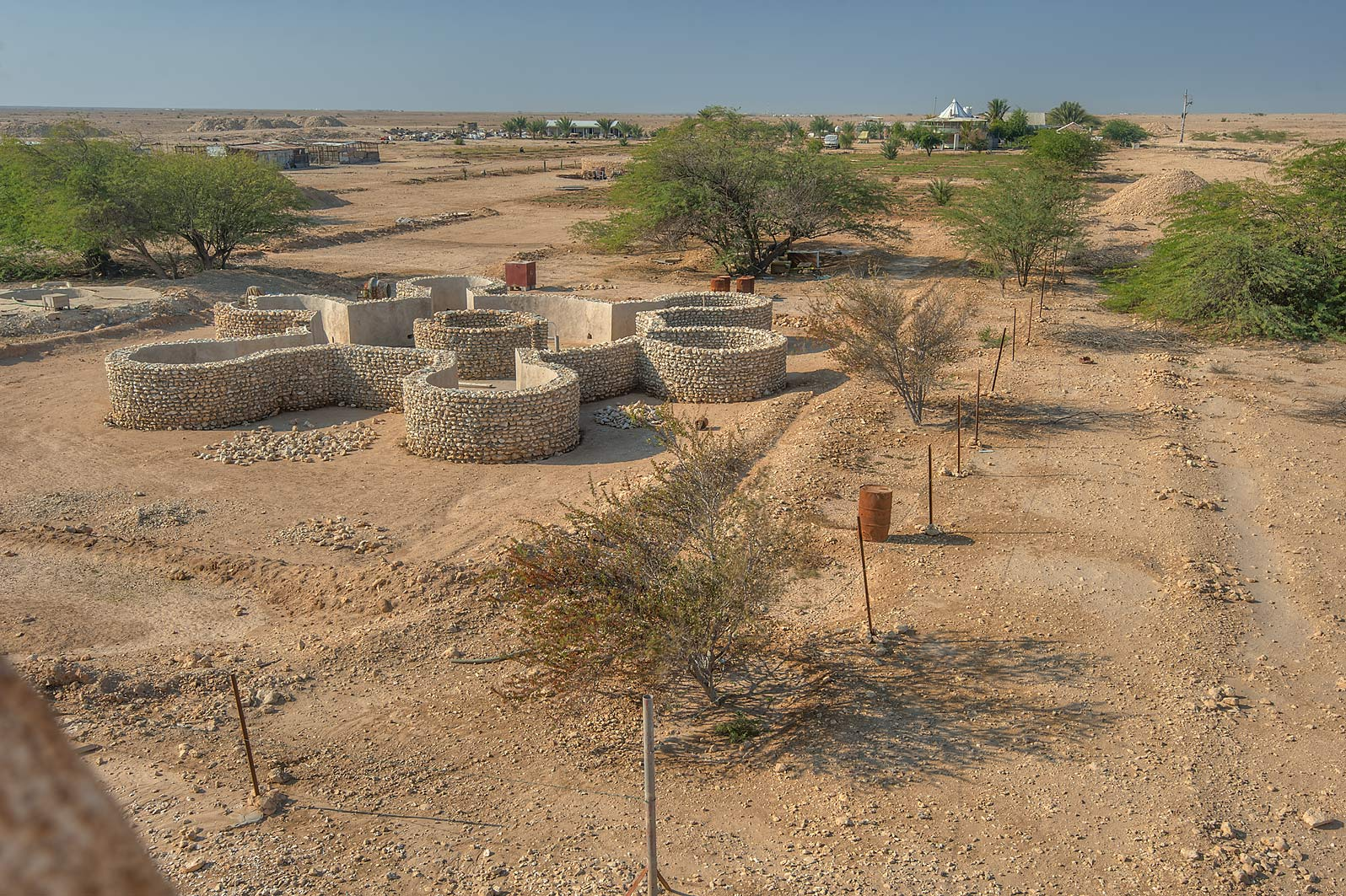
- Farmland in Qalaat al Thaqab, view from Ath Thaqab Fort

- Location in Qatar
- Coordinates: 26°1′57″N 51°6′59″E
- Country: Qatar
- Municipality: Al Shamal
- Zone: Zone 78
- District no.: 409

Area
  - Total: 9.9 km^{2} (3.8 sq mi)

Qalaat al Thaqab (Arabic: قلعة الثقاب) is an abandoned village in Qatar, in the municipality of Al Shamal, approximately 110 km (68 mi) away from the capital Doha. It is close to the settlements of Al Ruwaydah and Al Khuwayr, the latter of which is only 4.8 km (3 mi) away. Thaqab Fort is located in the vicinity of the settlement.

== Etymology ==
The name is derived from the Arabic word thaghab, which can be translated as "hole". In this context, the term refers to natural channels or runnels carved into the earth by flowing water. During the rainy season, these shallow streams fill with water and may retain moisture for extended periods.

== History ==
Archaeological evidence has shown that Thaqab has been inhabited since the 10th century. In J. G. Lorimer's Gazetteer of the Persian Gulf, it is stated that in 1908, Ath Thaqab had a well from which the inhabitants of the nearby settlement of Al Khuwayr would fetch their water. The well was described as being approximately 35 feet (11 m) deep and yielding good water.

In the early 20th century, the Bedouins of the Na'im tribe living in the region of Zubarah were involved in conflicts with the Al Thani who ruled Qatar. Though they were loyal to the Al Khalifa, the ruling family of Bahrain, the tribe agreed to abide by the rules set by Qatar's emir, Abdullah bin Jassim Al Thani. In July 1937, Sheikh Abdullah Al Thani reported to the British agency that he was to take action against the Al Jabor faction of the Na'im tribe who were residing in Ath Thaqab over their perceived violation of the country's laws, sparking the 1937 Qatari–Bahraini conflict. The tribal leader of the Na'im claimed that Abdullah Al Thani had stolen their livestock and had set fire to the Na'im's houses and villages before and after his decree.

Hostilities came to a boiling point when an armed force sent by Abdullah Al Thani, numbering in the hundreds, confronted around 60 armed men of the Na'im who were encamped inside Ath Thaqab Fort. According to Rashid bin Mohammed, upon encountering the Qatari loyalists, he and his troops surrendered, but four of his men were shot and killed anyway. Abdullah Al Thani's forces continued to capture the fort and occupy the villages of Ath Thaqab, Freiha, Al-ʽArish and Al Khuwayr, whose inhabitants were among the Na'im supporters. After the Na'im had conceded defeat, Abdullah Al Thani confiscated most of their weapons, including 40 rifles from the people of Ath Thaqab, and some of their livestock.

Based on field work carried out by anthropologists in Qatar in the 1950s, the main tribe in the area of Ath Thaqab were the Al Hiyyeh branch of the Na'im tribe.

== Ath Thaqab Fort ==
Ath Thaqab Fort is rectangular in shape and has four towers. A courtyard with stairs leading to the towers are in the center of the fort. It dates to somewhere between the 17th and 19th century.

== Gallery ==
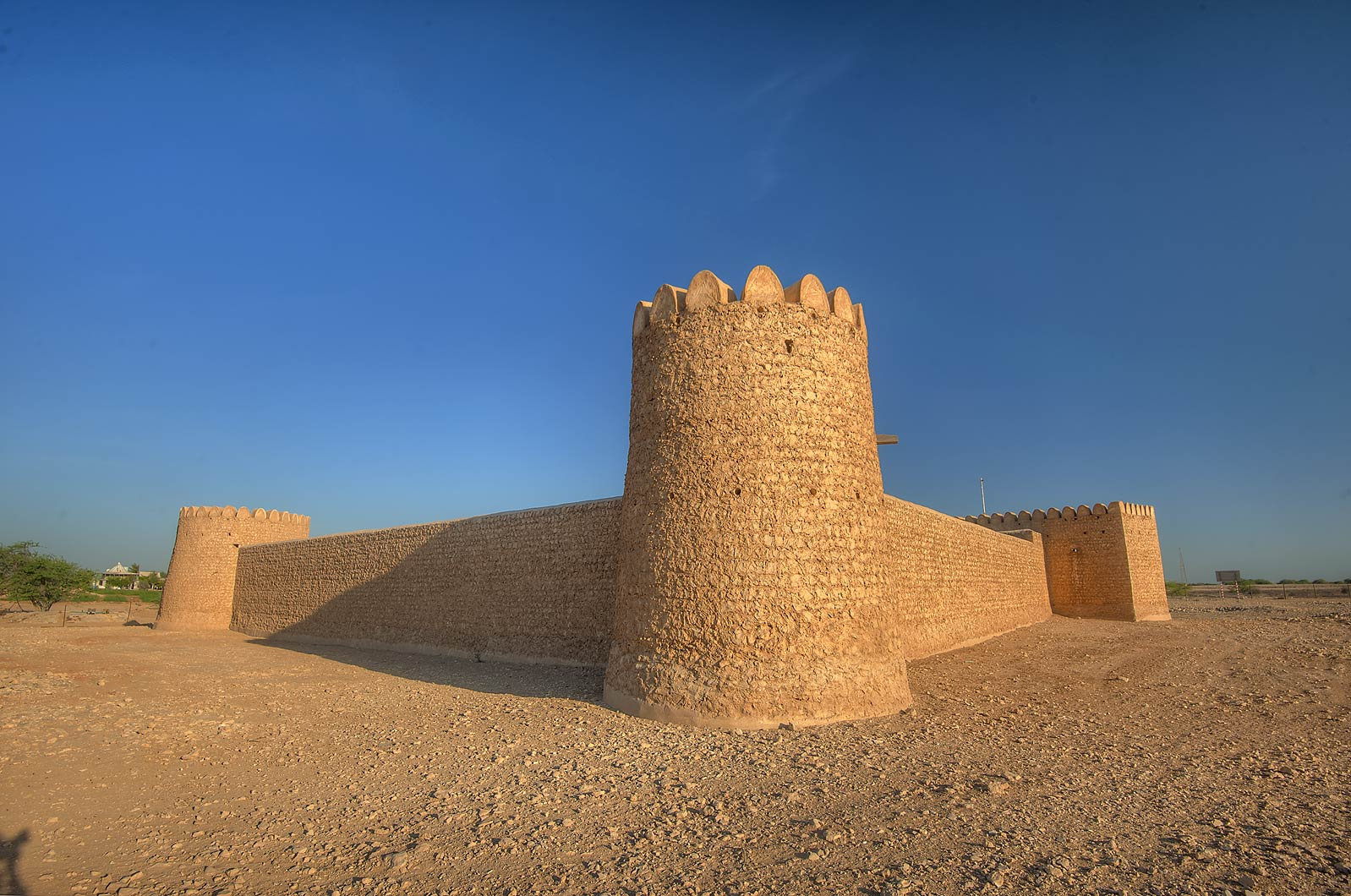
Ath Thaqab Fort, outside view.

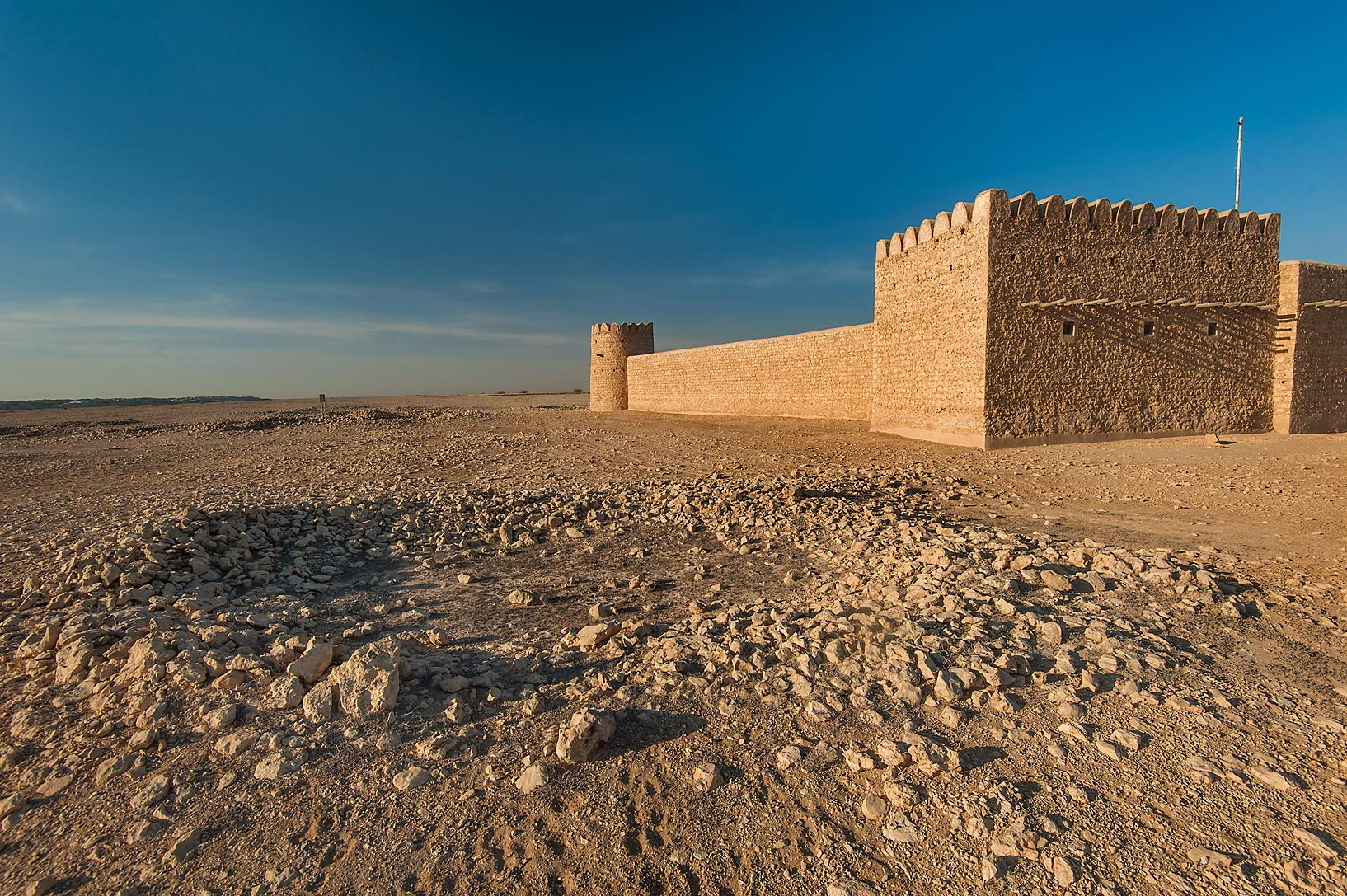
Stone ruins near Ath Thaqab Fort.

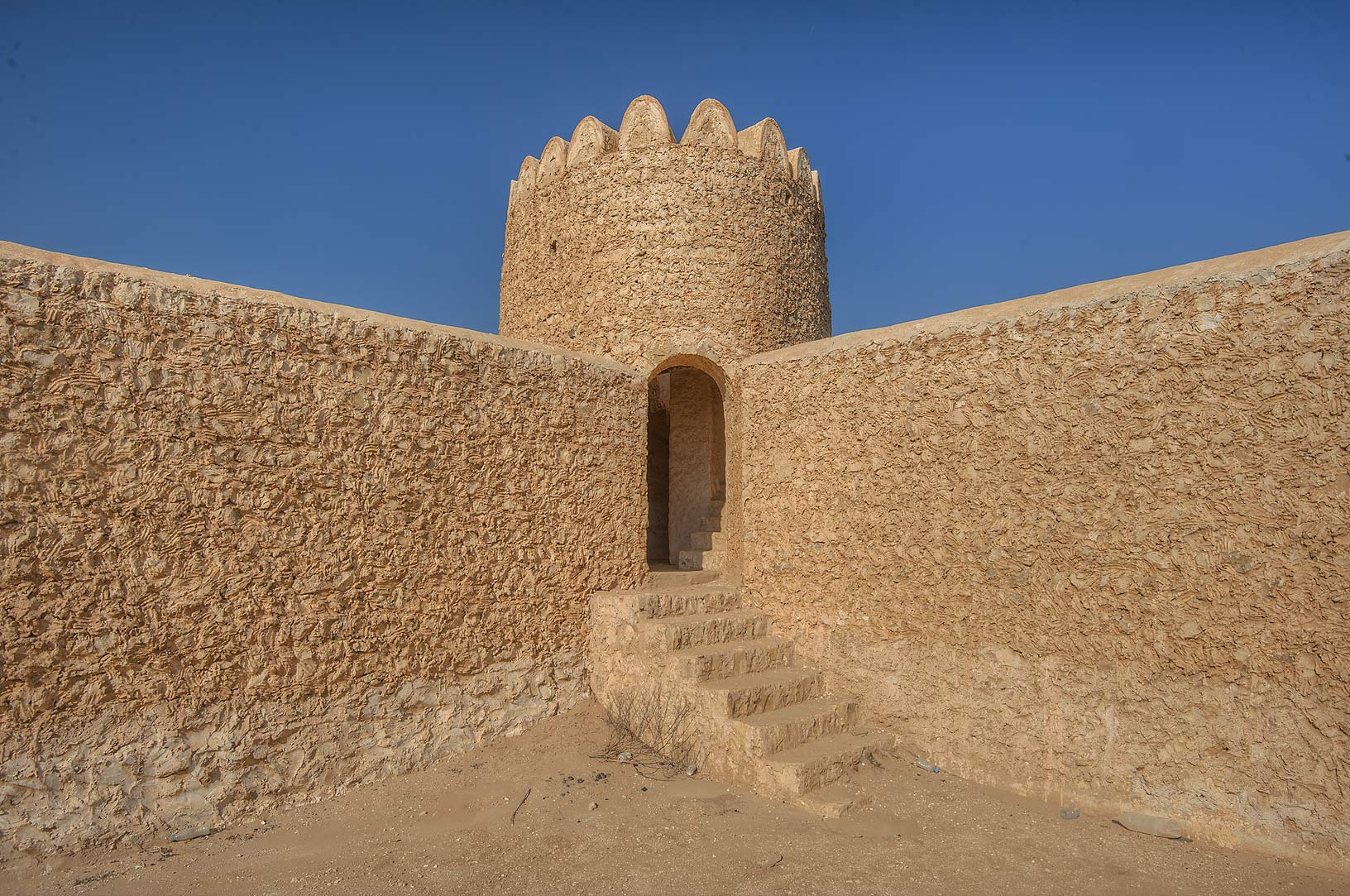
Round tower of Ath Thaqab Fort.

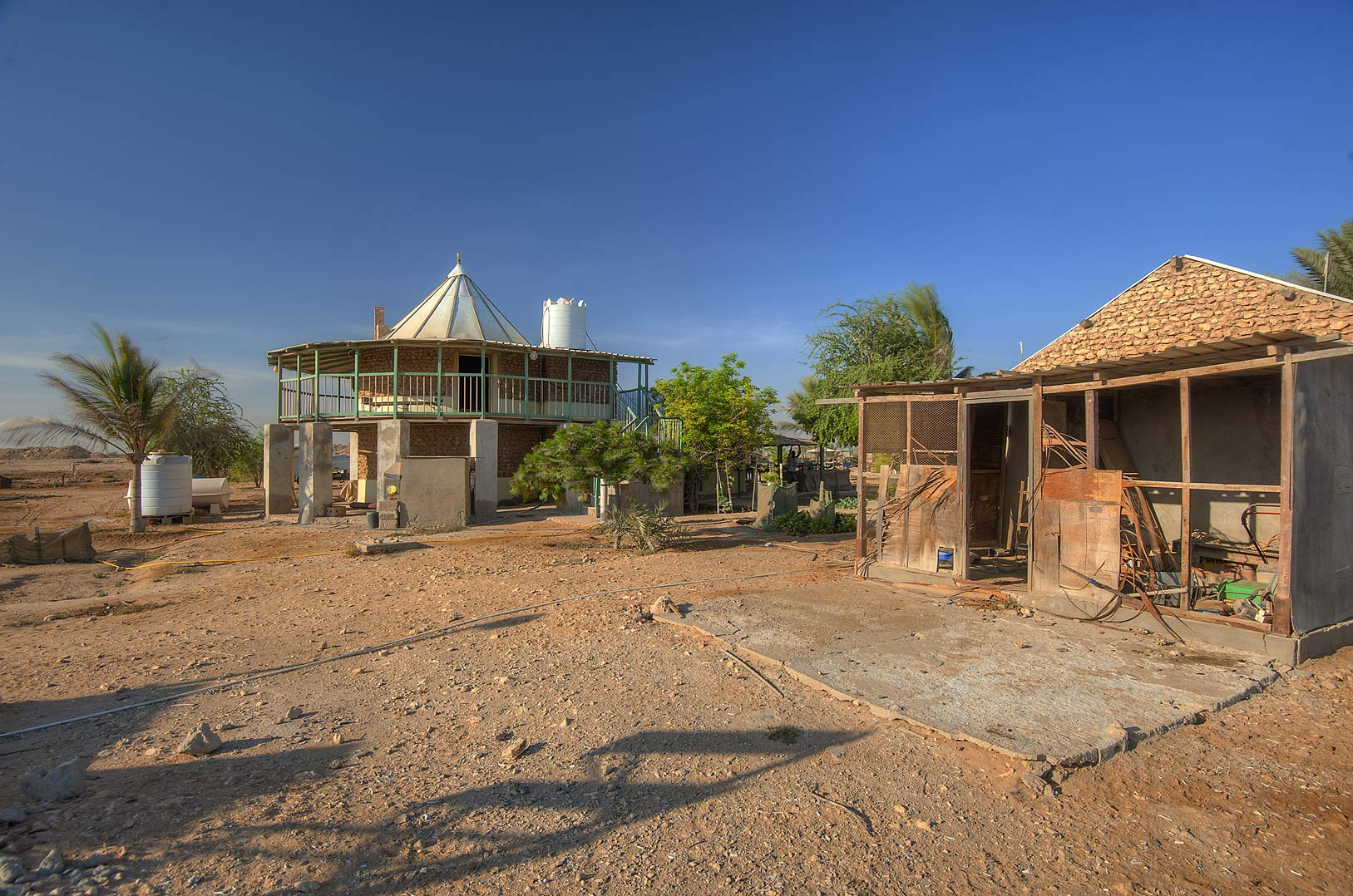
Farm structures near Ath Thaqab Fort.
