= Al Khuwayr =

Al Khuwayr الخوير
- Abandoned village
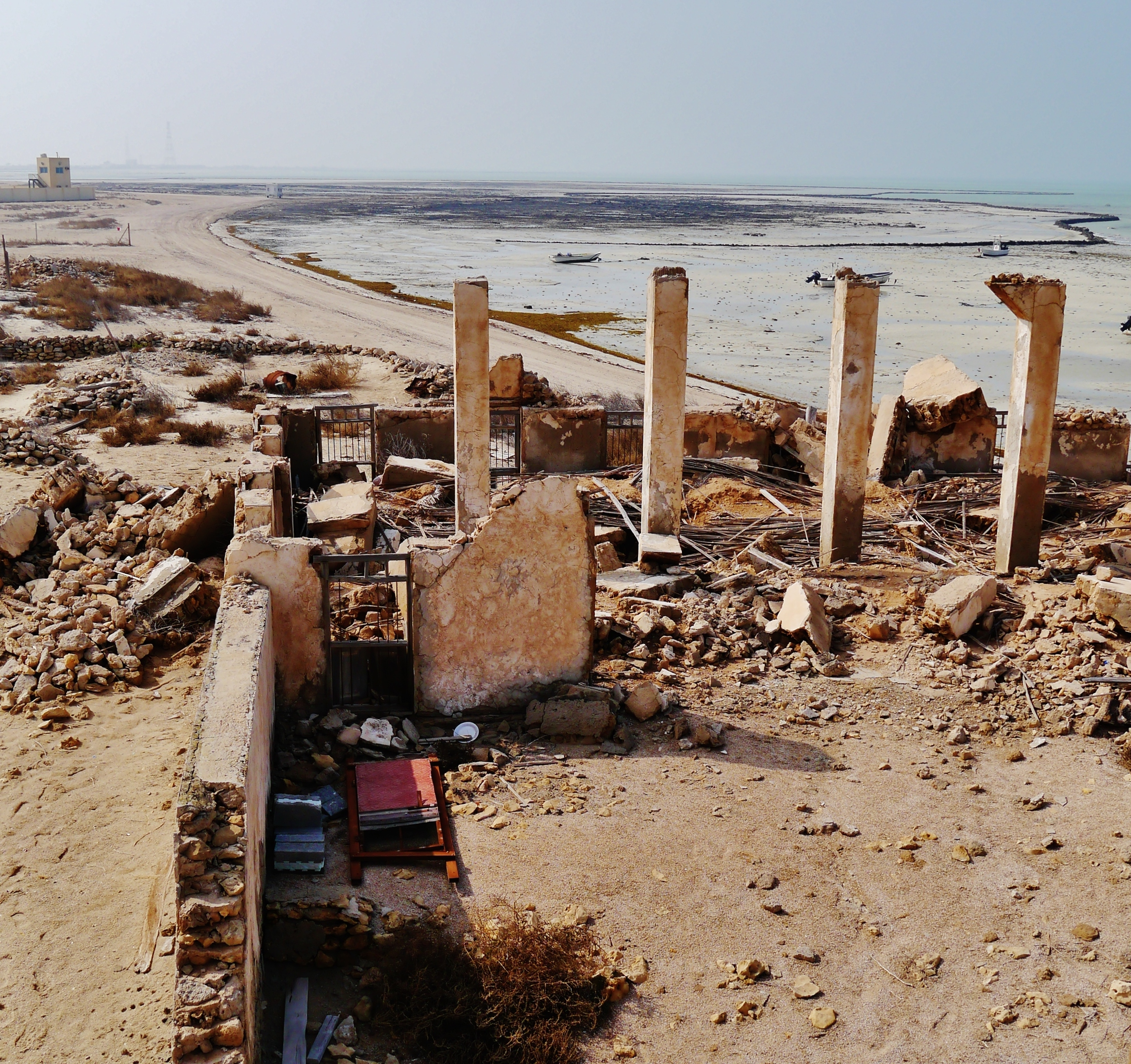
- View of the ruins at Al Khuwayr

- Location in Qatar
- Coordinates: 26°4′29″N 51°5′1″E
- Country: Qatar
- Municipality: Al Shamal
- Zone: Zone 78
- District no.: 394

Area
  - Total: 3.4 sq mi (8.8 km^{2})

Al Khuwayr (Arabic: الخوير) is an abandoned village in northwest Qatar, located in the municipality of Al Shamal. It is a popular domestic tourist attraction due to its history and ruined structures.

== History ==
=== 18th century ===
Al Khuwayr was previously known as Khor Hassan, literally meaning "beautiful inlet". In the late 18th century, noted pirate and tribal leader Rahmah ibn Jabir al-Jalhami settled Al Khuwayr. It served as his base of operations against the Al Khalifa in Bahrain. Rahmah's base in Al Khuwayr was surrounded by a protected bay which made it difficult for his enemies to attack the area. He resided in a fort with mud walls with only a few huts in the vicinity. Rahmah ibn Jabir successfully persuaded several Bahraini dissidents and people hostile to the Al Khalifa to migrate to Al Khuwayr. To ibn Jabir's enemies, the settlement bore the nickname "the fox's den".

In 1793, during the Saudi siege of Qatar, forces led by the Saudi commander Sulaiman ibn Ufaysan razed the village and would later seize control of the peninsula.

=== 19th century ===
After an incident in 1809 regarding Rahmah ibn Jabir's seizure of 20 Utub vessels from Kuwait, a son of Kuwait's ruler named Abdullah Al Sabah was killed. Kuwait's ruler responded by threatening to attack Al Khuwayr.

The Battle of Khakeekera took place here in March 1811 between Rahmah ibn Jabir's forces and the combined forces of Bahrain and Kuwait, ending in a victory for the Kuwaiti–Bahrain coalition.

Abu Al-Qassim Munshi, a British resident in Qatar, wrote a memo regarding the districts of Qatar in 1872. In it, he mentions that "in the year 1218 [1803 in the Gregorian calendar], Khor Hassan was ruled by the Al-e-Kbeiseh", referring to the Qubaisi, a sub-tribe of the Bani Yas.

In the 1820s, George Barnes Brucks carried out the first British survey of the Persian Gulf. He recorded the following notes about Al Khuwayr, which at that time was known as Khor Hassan:

Khor Hassan is in lat. 26° 4' 20" N., long. 51° 10' 55" E. It is a small village, with a square fort, belongs to Al Kubaisi tribe and Uttoobee [Bani Utbah] tribes, principally fishermen.

In 1867, following the imprisonment of a Na'im tribal chief in Al Wakrah, Jassim bin Mohammed Al Thani expelled Ahmed bin Mohammed Al Khalifa, the Bahraini representative in Qatar, from Al Wakrah. Consequently, Ahmed bin Mohammed fled to Al Khuwayr, from which he relayed his expulsion to the King of Bahrain, Muhammad bin Khalifa, who prepared a naval invasion which culminated in the Qatari–Bahraini War. After the war had ended in 1868 and Muhammad bin Khalifa was deposed and declared a fugitive by British authorities, he also took temporary refuge in Al Khuwayr.

=== 20th century ===
J. G. Lorimer's Gazetteer of the Persian Gulf gives an account of Al Khuwayr in 1908:

A village on the west coast of the Qatar promontory about 10 miles from its northern extremity. It is frequently spoken of simply as "Khuwair" in contradistinction to "Khor" on the opposite side of the promontory. Khuwair possesses a tribal fort in a good state of repair and is inhabited by about 80 families of the Kibisah [Qubaisi] tribe, who live solely by pearl diving and fishing; they have 20 pearl boats [manned by 240 men], 5 fishing boats and 20 camels, but no other resources of any sort. Drinking water is fetched from Thaqab, about 3 miles to the south-east. A small islet off Khuwair Hassan is known as Jazirat-al-Khuwair.

Al Khuwayr was among the villages occupied by Abdullah bin Jassim Al Thani's forces in July 1937 during the 1937 Qatari–Bahraini conflict, in which he led a military expedition against the Al Jabor faction of the Al Naim tribe, whom he considered to be defectors to Bahrain.

It was remarked by the British Political Resident in Bahrain that in 1939, the main tribe in al Khuwayr was Al-Shebarah, which numbered over 50 people and were led by Saleh Bin Dasm.

== Geography ==
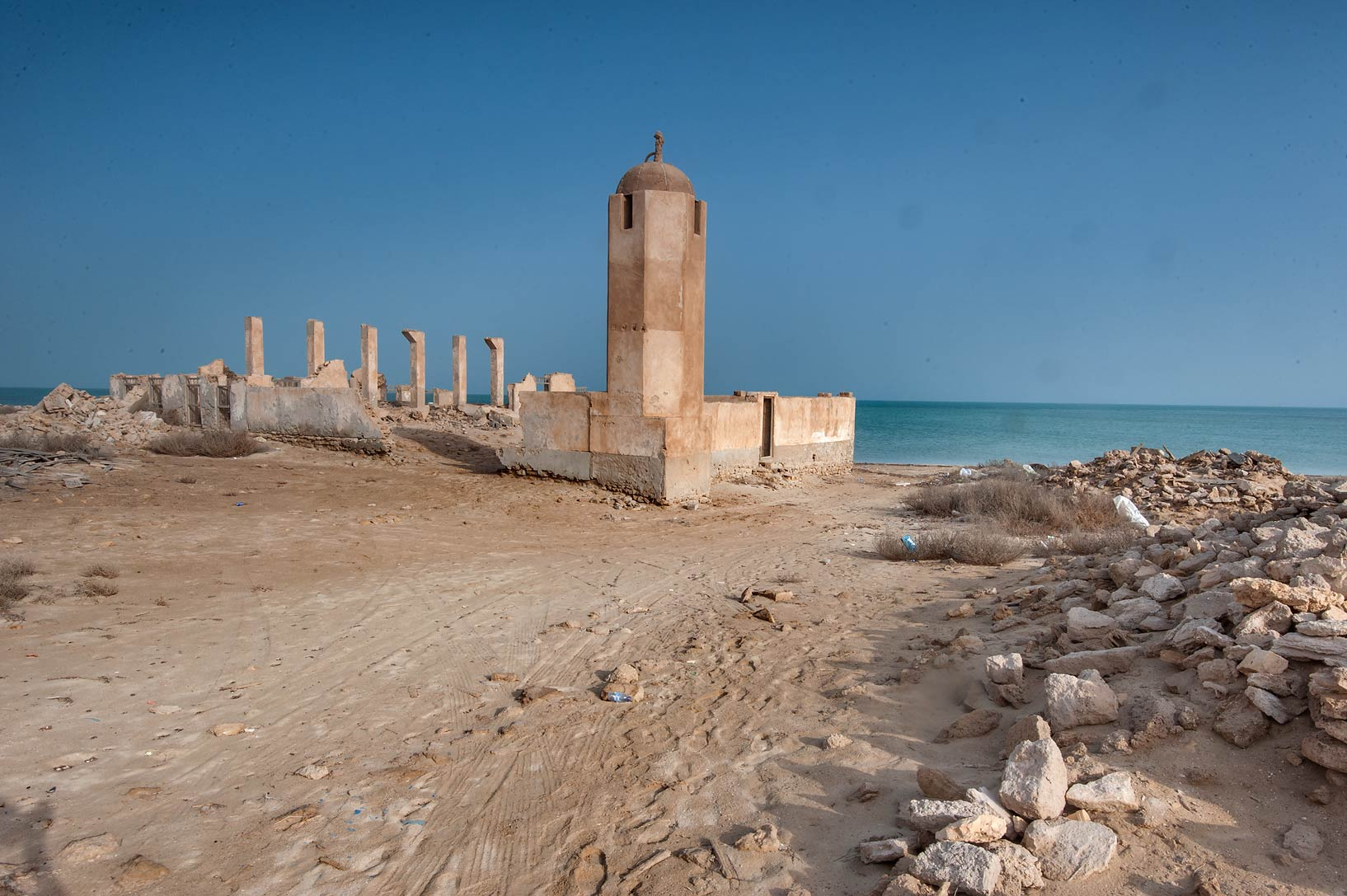
A ruined mosque in Al Khuwayr.

To the immediate north of Al Khuwayr is Al Khuwayr Island.

== Education ==
The settlement's first formal school was opened in 1957.

== Notable residents ==
- Qatari ibn al-Fuja'a, 7th century Arab poet and Khariji leader
- Rahmah ibn Jabir al-Jalhami, 18th–19th century pirate and transitory ruler of Qatar

== Gallery ==
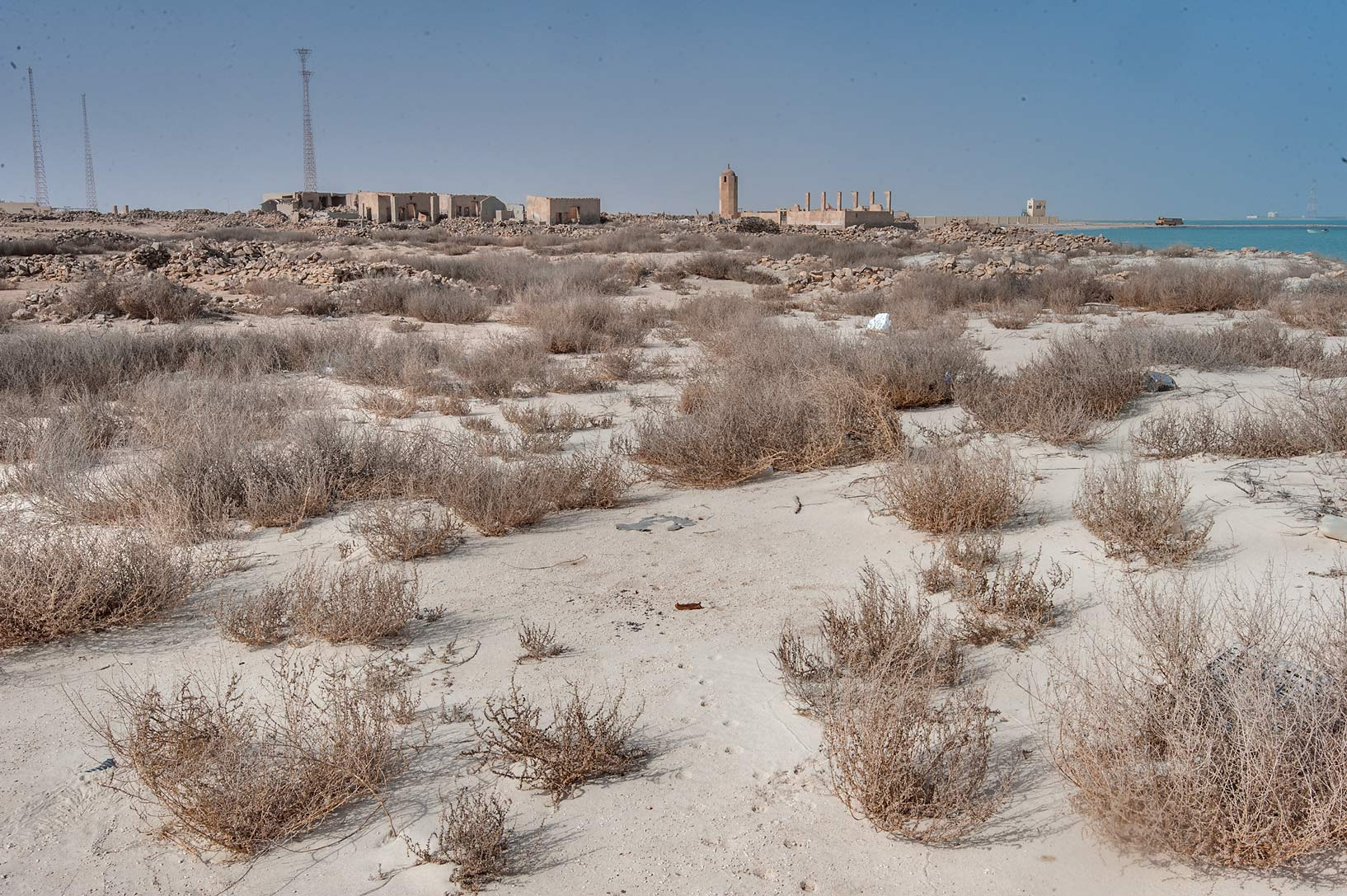
Far view of ruins at Al Khuwayr.

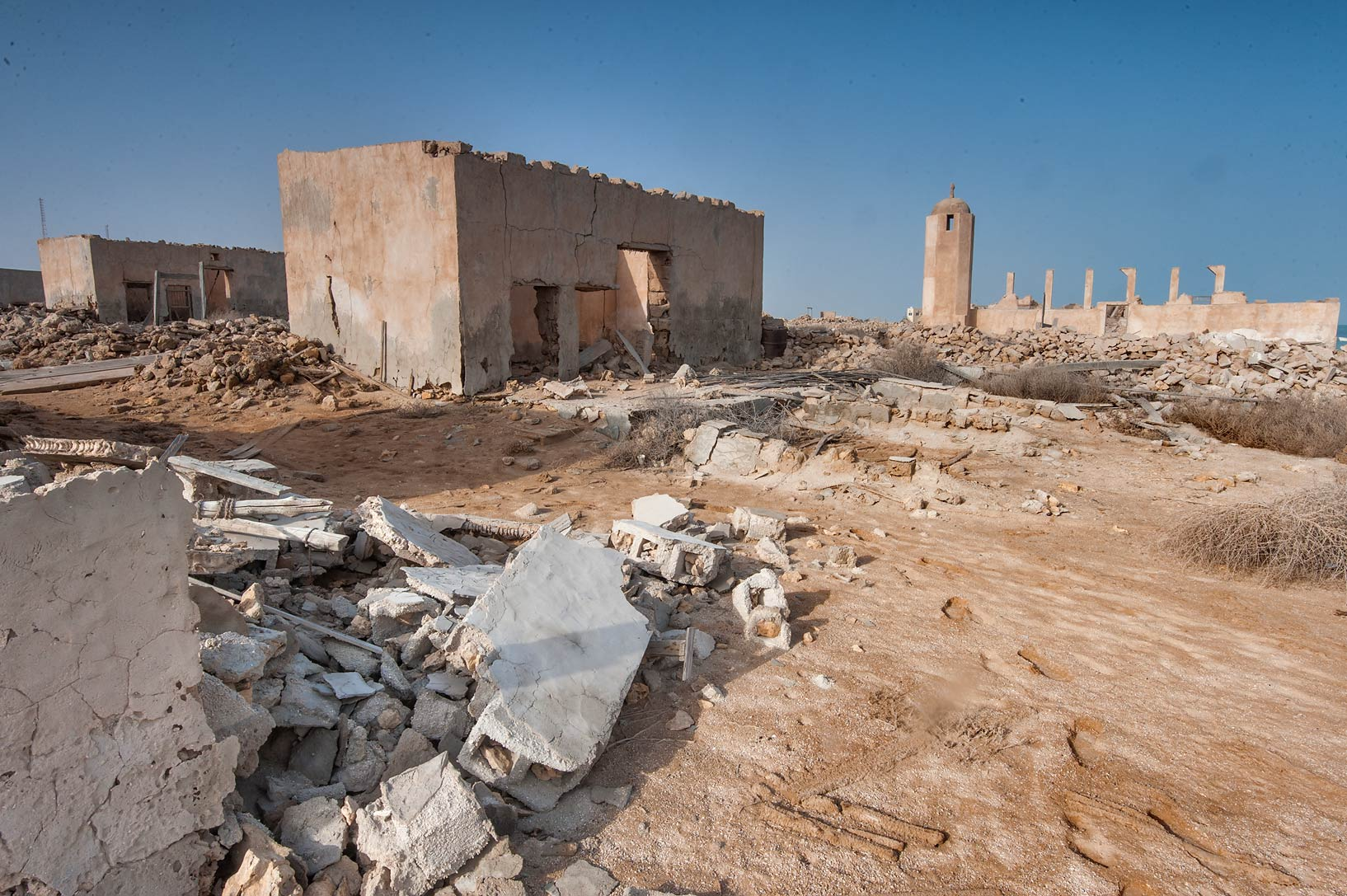
Ruined structures in Al Khuwayr.

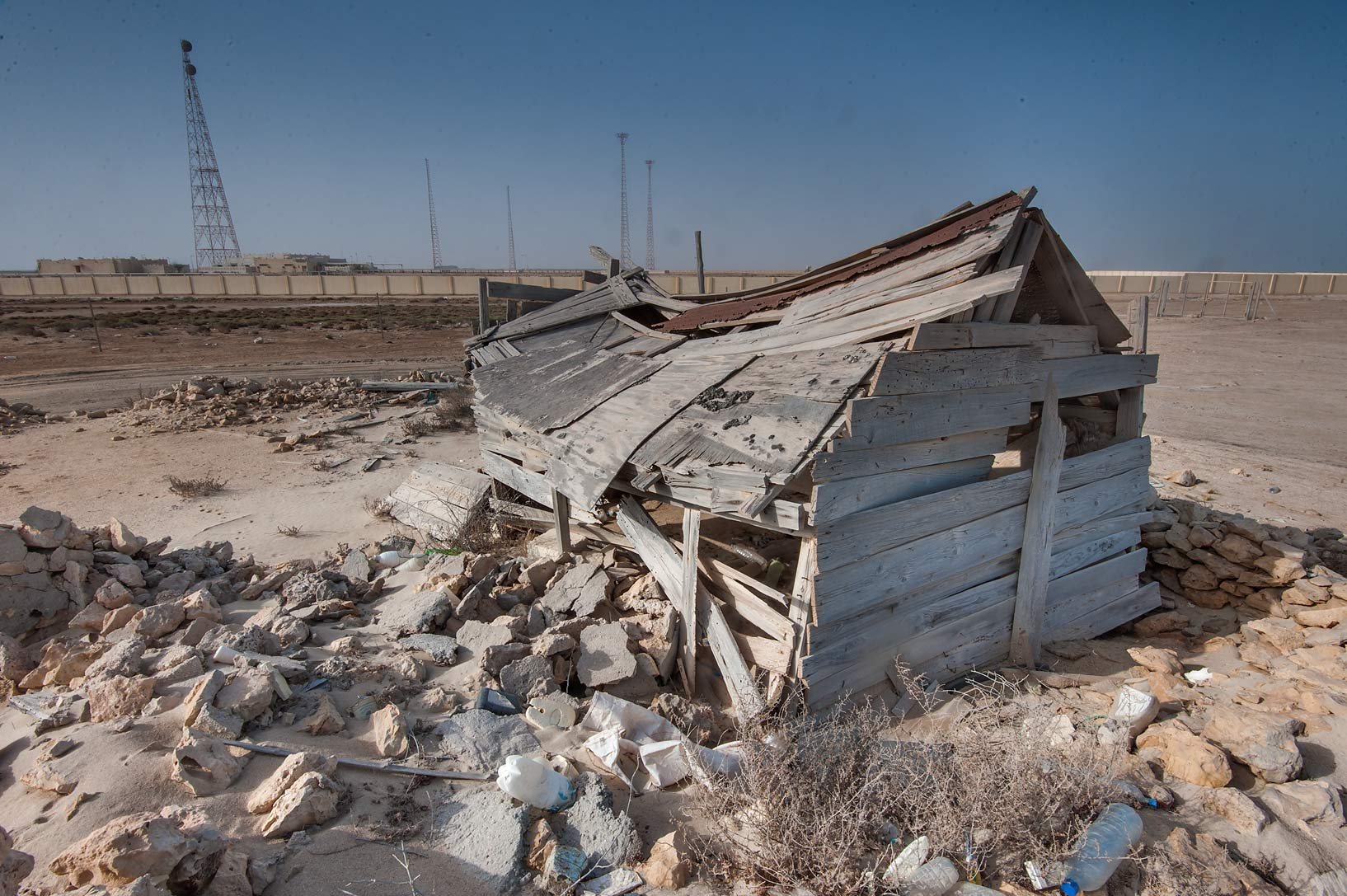
Crumbling wooden building in Al Khuwayr.
