= Qit'at Jaradah =

Small island in the Persian Gulf

Qit'at Jaradah Island
- Interactive map of Qit'at Jaradah Island

Geography
- Location: Persian Gulf
- Coordinates: 26.178°N 50.90°E
- Archipelago: Bahrain
- Adjacent to: Persian Gulf
- Total islands: 1
- Area: 48 m^{2} (520 sq ft) (at high-tide); 45,000 m^{2} (480,000 sq ft) (at low-tide)
- Highest elevation: 0.4 m (1.3 ft) (at high tide)

Administration
- Bahrain
- Governorate: Muharraq Governorate

Demographics
- Demonym: Bahraini
- Population: 0 (2016)
- Pop. density: 0/km^{2} (0/sq mi)

Additional information
- Time zone: AST (UTC+3)
- ISO code: BH-14
- Official website: www.bahrain.com

Qit'at Jaradah Island
Location, approximately mid-way between Bahrain and Qatar

Qit'at Jaradah is a cay in the Persian Gulf to the east of Bahrain Island, located 32 km (20 mi) east of Manama, the capital of Bahrain. Historically, the feature was only above the water during spring low tide; it sits approximately midway between Bahrain and Qatar, within the 12-mile (19 km) territorial waters of both countries. It was one of several maritime features contributing to a long running dispute between Bahrain and Qatar.

== Geography ==
While historically Qit'at Jaradah had not been considered an island, in 2000 Bahrain claimed that the cay measured approximately 12 by 4 metres (39 ft × 13 ft) at high tide with an elevation of approximately 0.4 metres (1 ft 4 in), and 600 by 75 metres (1,969 ft × 246 ft) at low tide. The opposing view is that it is a low-tide elevation. The feature is uninhabited and without vegetation.

== History ==
Bahrain first claimed ownership of the cay in 1936, supported by the British Maritime Boundary Award of 1947. Qit'at Jaradah would be in Qatari waters with respect to the equidistant line that otherwise divides the nations in this area. The British were influenced by the de facto operations of oil companies at the time. Although awarded to Bahrain, the feature was not classified as an island with territorial waters of 3 miles (4.8 km). This was consistent with the definition of an island of the Geneva Conference of 1958, which required an island to be above water at high tide. However, in 1959 the British attempted to reclassify Qit'at Jaradah as an island, as did the government of Bahrain in 1964. Qatar rejected this claim in 1965 and then sought international arbitration. Nothing resulted, as neither nation was a member of the United Nations until 1971. By 1986, Qatar declared several disputed areas, including Qit'at Jaradah, as military zones. As the two parties neared conflict, tensions were reduced under pressure from Oman, Saudi Arabia, and the UAE to resume the status quo ante. Saudi Arabia, through the Gulf Cooperation Council, attempted to negotiate a permanent agreement but was unsuccessful. In 1991, Qatar again sought arbitration by the International Court of Justice at The Hague.

=== 2003 International Court of Justice ruling ===
In 2003, the International Court of Justice ruled by a 12–5 vote in the Qatar v. Bahrain case that Qit'at Jaradah was an island and that sovereignty belonged to Bahrain, although dissenting opinions questioned whether it should be considered an island given its small size, variable physical characteristics, and lack of firm ground. The court's ruling stated that "the activities carried out by Bahrain on that island must be considered sufficient to support Bahrain's claim that it has sovereignty over it." Bahrain's activities on the "island" included placing a navigation beacon, drilling an artesian well, and permitting fishing and oil exploration. This conclusion could not have been reached if the court had not ruled it an island, as sovereignty can be acquired by occupation only of an island, not a low-tide elevation. Qatar had argued that it had never been shown on navigation charts as an island and that even if not always completely submerged at high tide, it still shouldn't be considered an island.

== See also ==
- Bahrain–Qatar relations
- Territorial disputes in the Persian Gulf
