= Fasht Dibal conflict =

1985 conflict between Qatar and Bahrain

- Qatar’s Al Shamal Municipality, including Fasht Dibal
Date	1985 – June 16, 1986
Location	Persian Gulf
Result	Qatar temporarily occupies the island: Island is occupied, declared a "restricted zone", and all officials and workers are detained; Qatar reaches an agreement with Bahrain and withdraws in June 1986; Island is determined to be under Qatari sovereignty by the International Court of Justice (ICJ) in 2001

Belligerents
Qatar	Bahrain

Casualties and losses
0	0

The Fasht Dibal conflict was a territorial conflict that arose between Qatar and Bahrain.

In 1985, Bahrain began to construct several fortifications on the disputed island. Consequently, Qatar considered the construction to be a violation of an existing agreement made in 1978. In April 1986, Qatar occupied the island with a military force. On the island, there was an unspecified number of Bahraini officials, as well as 29 workers hired by Ballast Nedam, a Dutch company. The army detained those on the island. Nearly a month later, on 12 May 1986, Bahrain and Qatar reached an agreement following protests in the Gulf and the Netherlands.

The detained officials and hired workers were subsequently released, and Qatar withdrew from the island a month later on 15 June 1986. After the 2001 ICJ case, Qatar obtained the island.

== See also ==
- Bahrain–Qatar relations
- Territorial disputes in the Persian Gulf#Bahrain and Qatar
