= Qatar v. Bahrain =

ICJ case

Qatar v. Bahrain (Maritime Delimitation and Territorial Questions between Qatar and Bahrain) is a case addressing the territorial ownership and maritime delimitations of the Hawar Islands, an archipelago of 17 islands, islets, and rocks situated off the coast of Qatar in the Gulf of Bahrain of the Arabian/Persian Gulf. It is the only territorial dispute between two Arab states that has been resolved by the International Court of Justice (ICJ). The case was resolved in 2001.

== Background ==
=== Timeline ===
- May 1932: Bahrain Petroleum Company (BAPCO) discovers oil.
- 1936: Qatar lodges first formal compliant over ownership of the disputed territory.
- 1939: British government decides ownership in favour of Bahrain.
- 1985: Attempted arbitration by Saudi Arabia, but talks become deadlocked following Qatari refusal to recognize a dispute over Zubarah.
- 1971: British presence leaves Bahrain and Qatar as both claim independence on 15 August 1971 and 3 September 1971, respectively.
- 1976: Attempted Saudi mediation.
- 1980: Bahrain discovers potentially significant oil and gas resources in seabed near Hawar Islands.
- 1982: Both states accept Saudi mediation efforts.
- March 1983: “Principles for the Framework for Reaching a Settlement” are proposed by King Fahd of Saudi Arabia.
- April 1986: Qatar sends security force to put an end to construction work undertaken by Bahrain on then-disputed Fasht al-Dibal.
- December 1990: “Doha minutes” signed by the foreign ministers of Qatar, Saudi Arabia, and Bahrain at the 11th Gulf Cooperation Council (GCC) Summit.
- July 1991: Qatar unilaterally files an application to the ICJ.
- July 1994: Unanimous Qatar v. Bahrain (Jurisdiction and Admissibility) judgement is delivered. ICJ rules that the "Bahraini formula" is legally binding.
- July and August 1996: Bahrain again urges Qatar to negotiate a settlement under regional mediation.
- March 2001: Qatar v. Bahrain Maritime Delimitation and Territorial Questions (Merits) judgement is delivered.

=== Historical context ===
In 1783, the Al Khalifa tribe, whose descendants are now the modern-day rulers of Bahrain, made the Hawar Islands and Zubarah their home. Throughout the 19th century, the islands rotated through Saudi, Egyptian, Iranian, and eventually British control. This ended with Bahraini independence in 1971.

=== Geography ===
The islands are around 1 nautical mile (1.9 km) from the Qatari peninsula. This proximity formed the basis of Doha's claim to the islands, while Manama's claim found basis in historical circumstances, including the 1939 British decision.

The area in discussion is situated on the southern end of the Gulf, to the northwest of the Strait of Hormuz. In contrast, the 1999 dispute between Eritrea and Yemen involved a maritime boundary that was connected to the strategically significant Bab el-Mandeb Strait.

=== Strategic importance ===
Therefore, the case was not considered strategically important until the discovery of oil. Doha first lodged a complaint in 1936, following talks initiated by the Bahrain Petroleum Company (BAPCO) and the Anglo-Persian Oil Company with Manama for rights to exploration in the seabed area between the two nations. However, the case did not progress to any meaningful resolution until 1980, when Bahrain found potentially significant oil and gas resources in the seabed near the Hawar Islands. Following this, the two nations ramped up efforts to seek a comprehensive resolution to the issue.

== Maritime Delimitation and Territorial Questions between Qatar and Bahrain (Qatar v. Bahrain) ==
In 1991, after 55 years of official dispute, Qatar unilaterally submitted the case for adjudication by the ICJ, seeking to overturn the 1939 British decision to award the islands to Bahrain. Doha argued that the original decision was biased due to a British belief that Bahrain was a more reliable ally in the interwar years. Furthermore, it posited that the decision was a purely administrative one. Bahrain argued that proximity, adjacency, or contiguity were irrelevant, arguing that the 1939 decision was legally binding.

The “Principles for the Framework for Reaching a Settlement”, proposed by the kind of Saudi Arabia in 1976 and agreed upon by both Qatar and Bahrain in the subsequent decade specified that all issues of dispute, including maritime boundaries, territorial waters, and sovereignty over islands were to be considered complementary and thus had to be resolved comprehensively in tandem.

A key point of dispute during the case was the admissibility of two sets of documents submitted by Qatar. This package consisted of two components: a set of letters concluded in December 1987 between Qatar, Saudi Arabia, and Bahrain; and an agreement signed at the end of a GCC meeting in December 1990, often referred to as the “Doha minutes”. The first component was admitted with little dissent, but the latter was a larger point of contention.

The 1990 Minutes consisted of the minutes taken at a meeting between Qatar, Saudi Arabia, and Bahrain during a GCC summit on 25 December 1990; and subsequently signed by the foreign ministers of all three states. Bahrain objected to the Qatari proposition that the minutes constituted legal rights and obligations, but ultimately the Court cited the Vienna Convention on the Law of Treaties in ruling that the minutes were a legally binding agreement.

== ICJ decision and outcomes ==
The ICJ ruled that both parties had consented to Great Britain determining the sovereignty of their territories. As such, on all islands but two, it found that sovereignty rested with Bahrain. The Court awarded Zubarah to Qatar on the basis of the Anglo-Ottoman Convention of 1913, as well as Fasht al-Dibal.

The Court found Qit’at Jaradah to be above high tide, and therefore qualified as a landmass and subsequently was awarded to Bahrain on the basis of its activities there. However, said activities were ignored for the delimitation of maritime boundaries between the two nations. On the latter, the Court found that the location of the feature constituted a special case, since its halfway location between the two nations’ coastlines would make for a disproportionate effect on the maritime borders if its location were used to construct a delimitation line based on equidistance as per the traditional formula.

== Motivations for utilizing the ICJ ==
A series of factors motivated the involved parties to turn to ICJ adjudication.

=== Conflict of interest ===
Despite numerous attempts at mediation, Saudi Arabia was simultaneously itself involved with territorial disputes with Qatar, potentially influencing its ability to act as a neutral third party. Similarly, although the GCC was created in 1981 with a mandate including dispute resolution, the close ties among Gulf states could not be siloed off and therefore interfered with the effectiveness of the institution's dispute resolution mechanism.

Arbitration by another Arab state, as per the regional tradition, had already been attempted. In 1990, Qatar and Bahrain agreed (under the purview of Saudi Arabia) that should the tripartite committee be unable to reach a conclusion on the contested territorial rights, they would request the ICJ to decide the issue.

=== Significant oil and gas potential ===
Following the 1980 discovery of potentially significant oil and gas resources, expected economic gains motivated an increased willingness to actively seek resolution. Neither state could drill without provoking the other, and doing so would negatively impact the acquisition of revenue in the form of oil resources. Since the resolution, Doha has greatly benefited. Most of Qatar's natural gas production is in the North Dome gas field, which lies nine miles from Fasht al-Dibal, awarded to the state by the ICJ ruling.

=== Collaboration on shared issues ===
Motivation to resolve the conflict also arose from the barrier it posed to joint collaboration on shared issues or projects. A planned joint gas pipeline, security against potential attacks by Iraq or Iran, and economic development initiatives were halted. The disputed nature of the islands also posed an access problem, as the territorial waters surrounding the islands provided access to other areas of the Gulf. As soon as 5 days after the dispute was resolved, the two states immediately announced joint industrial projects.

The standstill also extended to other Gulf states. One Egyptian diplomat noted that the dispute, should it remain unresolved, could have serious repercussions for the already fragile balance of alliances within the GCC. Bahraini boycotts of GCC summits prevented regional cooperation on a range of key shared issues, including security threats and a planned monetary union.

== Implications for Gulf cooperation dynamics and maritime security ==
This case marked a divergence from traditional dynamics between Arab states and international institutions. Historically, the region has preferred non-binding arbitration under the purview of a neighbour to international institutions that apply universal statutory law. 78% of states with legal codes based on, or influenced by, Islamic law submit their disputes to an Islamic third party. Even in the lead up to Manama's agreement to participate in the ICJ case, it repeatedly urged Doha to accept regional mediation. The choice to utilize the ICJ is particularly unique considering the divergence between the two legal systems in definitions of sovereignty. Islamic law has a definition of sovereignty that places more emphasis on the people or inhabitants, whereas the ICJ employs a notion of sovereignty based solely on territory.

The case was also fundamental to international maritime law for various reasons. It was the first time that the Court applied the equidistance method to a maritime delimitation involving adjacent coasts. A single maritime equidistant (median) boundary was constructed in two sectors: a southern sector of partially overlapping territorial seas, and a northern sector of partially overlapping continental shelves and Exclusive Economic Zones (EEZs). Interestingly, despite awarding sovereignty of 16 of the 17 elements of the Hawar Islands to Bahrain, the ICJ ruled that the waters between the islands and other Bahraini islands were to be not the internal waters of Bahrain, but a territorial sea — meaning all vessels are entitled to the customary right of innocent passage. In addition, customary law was applied despite neither nations being party to UNCLOS 1958, and Qatar not having ratified UNCLOS 1982. As aforementioned, the unique decision to weigh Qit'at Jaradah's role differently with regard to land/territorial sovereignty and maritime boundaries was also an interesting precedent.

== See also ==
- Territorial disputes in the Persian Gulf
