= Territorial disputes in the Persian Gulf =

This article deals with territorial disputes between states in and around the Persian Gulf in Southwestern Asia. These states include Iran, Iraq, Kuwait, Saudi Arabia, Bahrain, Qatar, the United Arab Emirates (UAE), and Oman.

== Background ==
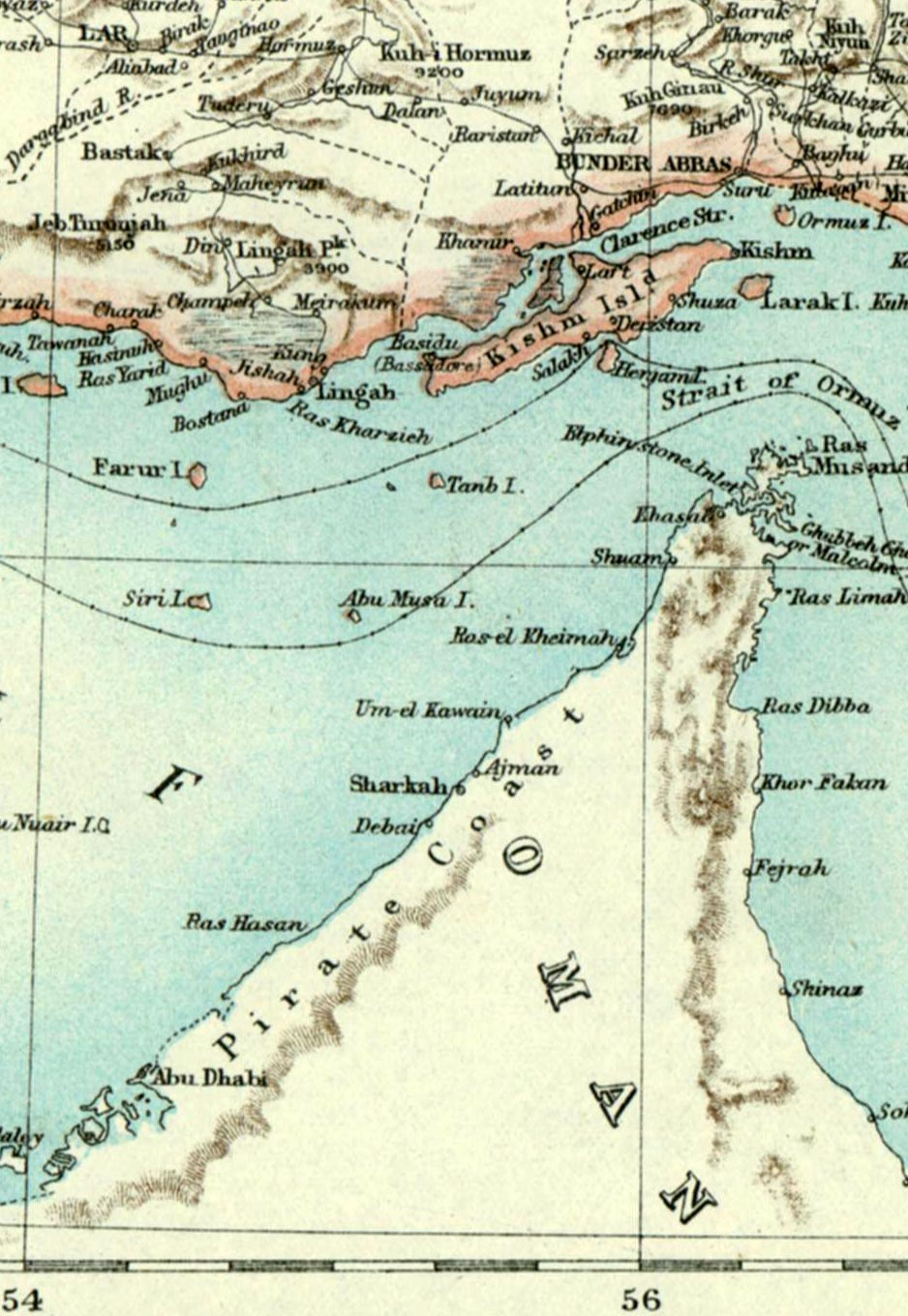
1892 British map showing the Strait of Hormuz

Before the oil era, the Persian Gulf states made little effort to delineate their territories. Members of Arab tribes felt loyalty to their tribe or shaykh and tended to roam across the Arabian desert according to the needs of their flocks. Official boundaries meant little, and the concept of allegiance to a distinct political unit was absent. Organized authority was confined to ports and oases. Superintended by the British government, the boundaries of Kuwait, Iraq and the province of Al-Hasa were delineated at Uqair in 1922. The signing of the first oil concessions in the 1930s brought a fresh impetus to the process.

Inland boundaries were never properly demarcated, leaving opportunities for contention, especially in areas of the most valuable oil deposits. Until 1971, British-led forces maintained peace and order in the Gulf, and British officials arbitrated local quarrels. After the withdrawal of these forces and officials, old territorial claims and suppressed tribal animosities resurfaced. The concept of the modern state — introduced into the Persian Gulf region by the European powers — and the sudden importance of boundaries to define ownership of oil deposits kindled acute territorial disputes.

== Iranian claims on Bahrain ==
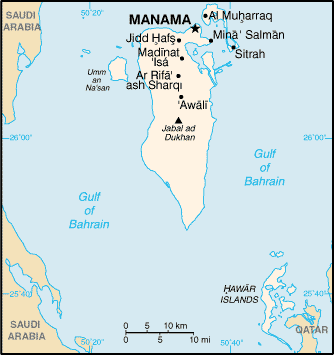
Map of Bahrain

Iran has often laid claim to Bahrain, based on its history of being a prominent part of the Persian Empire and its 17th century defeat of the Portuguese and its subsequent occupation of the Bahrain archipelago for many centuries. The Arab House of Khalifa, which has been the ruling family of Bahrain since the 18th century, has many times shown loyalty to Iran when disputes with the British were brought up by raising the Iranian flag on official buildings during the last years of the 19th century. Iran in return reserved two seats for Bahrain in its parliament, from 1906 to 1971, as its "14th province".

The last shah of Iran, Mohammad Reza Pahlavi, raised the Bahrain issue with the British when they withdrew from areas east of the Suez Canal by 1971. Iran suggested a limited, UN-sponsored opinion poll to decide the fate of Bahrain. The UN declared the limited public opinion (conducted under serious limitations involving selected few tribal and political elite) to have favored independence. Iran recognized the outcome, and Bahrain was officially declared independent.

== Abu Musa, Greater Tunb, and Lesser Tunb ==
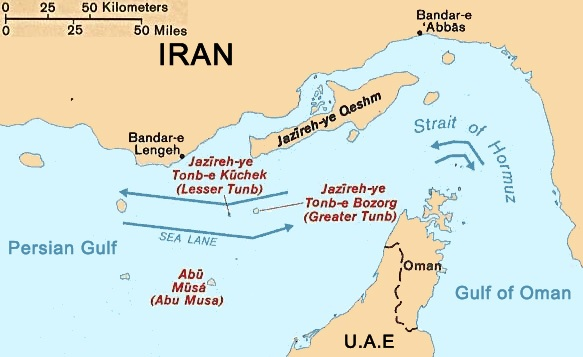
Map of the Strait of Hormuz

In 1971, after the British left the area, Iranian forces claimed the islands of Abu Musa, Greater Tunb, and Lesser Tunb, located at the mouth of the Persian Gulf between Iran and the UAE. The Iranians asserted their claims to the islands. Iran continued to hold the islands in 1993, and its action remained a source of contention with the UAE, which claimed authority by virtue of Britain's transfer of the islands to the emirates of Sharjah and Ras al-Khaimah. However, Britain had also agreed to give full authority to the Iranians in return for Iran's withdrawal of its claim on Bahrain.

By late 1992, Sharjah and Iran had reached agreement with regard to Abu Musa, but Ras al-Khaimah had not reached a settlement with Iran concerning Greater Tunb and Lesser Tunb. The UAE have attempted to bring the dispute before the International Court of Justice, but Iran refused. Tehran says the islands always belonged to it as it had never renounced possession of the islands, and that they are part of Iranian territory.

== Bahrain and Qatar ==
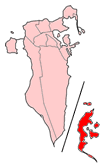
Location of the Hawar Islands

Starting in 1936, Qatar and Bahrain were involved in territorial disputes over the Hawar Islands, Fasht Al Azm, Fasht Dibal, Qit'at Jaradah, and Zubarah. One of the most substantial disputes was the Fasht Dibal conflict in 1985, after Bahrain began constructing fortifications on the island. Qatar considered the construction to be a violation of an existing agreement made in 1978. In April 1986, Qatari troops arrived on the island via helicopter and declared it a 'restricted zone'. They seized several Bahraini officials and 29 construction workers hired by the Dutch contracting company Ballast Nedam. On 12 May 1986, following protests by the Netherlands and mediation by several GCC member states, Bahrain and Qatar reached a settlement, after which the foreign workers were released. Qatari troops evacuated the island on 15 June.

In 1991 the dispute flared up again after Qatar instituted proceedings to let the International Court of Justice (ICJ) in The Hague, Netherlands, decide whether it had jurisdiction. The two countries exchanged complaints that their respective naval vessels had harassed the other's shipping in disputed waters. In 1996, Bahrain boycotted the GCC summit hosted in Qatar, claiming that the last summit held in Qatar in 1990 was used as a platform to reiterate their territorial claims to the other GCC states. They also cited the 1986 Qatari incursion in Fasht Dibal as a reason for not attending. The disputes were resolved by the International Court of Justice on 16 March 2001, awarding both sides equal amounts of land, giving Bahrain the Hawar Islands (excluding the Janan Island), Qit'at Jaradah, and Fasht Al Azm, with Qatar receiving Zubarah, Fasht Dibal, and the Janan Island.

== Iraq and Kuwait ==
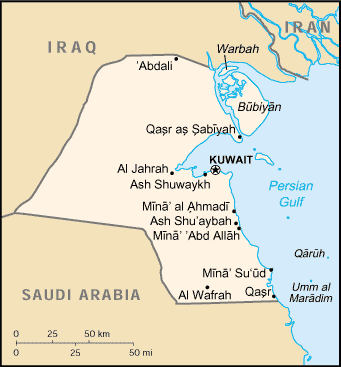
Map of Kuwait

As one pretext for his invasion of Kuwait in 1990, Saddam Hussein revived a long-standing Iraqi claim to the whole of Kuwait based on Ottoman Empire boundaries. The Ottoman Empire exercised a tenuous sovereignty over Kuwait in the late 19th century, but the area passed under British protection in 1899. In 1932, Iraq informally confirmed its border with Kuwait, which had previously been demarcated by the British. In 1961, after Kuwait's independence and the withdrawal of British troops, Iraq reasserted its claim to the emirate based on the Ottomans' having attached it to Basra Province. British troops and aircraft were rushed back to Kuwait. A Saudi Arabian-led force of 3,000 from the League of Arab States (Arab League) that supported Kuwait against Iraqi pressure soon replaced them.

The boundary issue again arose when the Baath Party came to power in Iraq after a 1963 revolution. The new government officially recognized the independence of Kuwait and the boundaries Iraq had accepted in 1932. Iraq nevertheless reinstated its claims to Bubiyan and Warbah islands in 1973, massing troops at the border. During the 1980–88 Iran–Iraq War, Iraq pressed for a long-term lease to the islands in order to improve its access to the Persian Gulf and its strategic position. Although Kuwait rebuffed Iraq, relations continued to be strained by boundary issues and inconclusive negotiations over the status of the islands.

In August 1991, Kuwait charged that a force of Iraqis, backed by gunboats, had attacked Bubiyan but had been repulsed and many of the invaders captured. UN investigators found that the Iraqis had come from fishing boats and had probably been scavenging for military supplies abandoned after the Persian Gulf War. Kuwait was suspected of having exaggerated the incident to underscore its need for international support against ongoing Iraqi hostility.

Following the 2004 return of sovereignty to Iraq, Kuwait negotiated a 5 km "Area of Separation" agreement with the government of Iraq as part of Resolution 833. That agreement expired in 2016; However, neither government moved military forces into the zone. Tensions have arisen over disputes concerning navigable waters covered under the agreement including the Khor Abdullah estuary.

Smaller incidents have also arisen, primarily along the major road joining the two countries at the border control station known as "K Crossing." These include small protests that included small arms fire, militant threats to retaliate for "Kuwaiti incursions". The Kuwaiti Ministry of the Interior (MOI) has reported that IS poses no threat to the Kuwaiti border.

== United Arab Emirates and Saudi Arabia ==
Two disputes exist between the two countries over the territorial waters claimed through the land owned by Saudi Arabia between Qatar and the United Arab Emirates. It is believed that the eastward side infringes into UAE territorial waters and has led to minor skirmishes between the two countries.

The second dispute lies in the unusual extent of these waters from the Saudi coastline which explains how the above area extends further than expected by the Emiratis and is justified by Saudi Arabia. While no map exist on the internet, it is believed a corridor exists along the Qatari/Emirati maritime boundary on the Qatari side extending up to the Iranian maritime boundary. This has been alluded to in documents submitted to the United Nations. It would be expected that Iran would also dispute any corridor directly linking them to Saudi Arabia.

== Al Buraimi ==
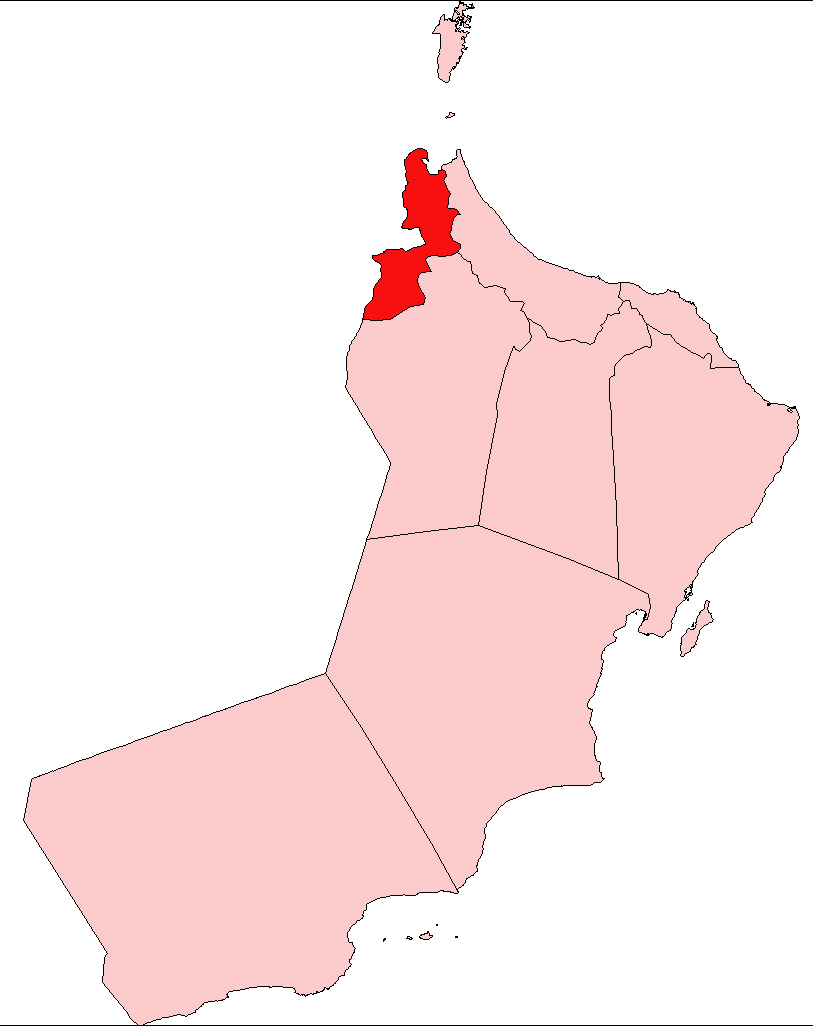
Location of Al Buraimi in Oman

A particularly long and acrimonious disagreement involved claims over the Al Buraimi Oasis, disputed since the 19th century among tribes from Saudi Arabia, Abu Dhabi, and Oman. Although the tribes residing in the nine settlements of the oasis were from Oman and Abu Dhabi, followers of the Wahhabi religious movement that originated in what is now Saudi Arabia had periodically occupied and exacted tribute from the area. Oil prospecting began in the 1930s with the Iraq Petroleum Company creating subsidiary companies to explore and survey the area. In the late 1940s, Aramco survey parties began probing into Abu Dhabi territory with armed Saudi guards.

Matters came to a head with a non-violent confrontation between Abu Dhabi and Saudi Arabia in 1949 known as the "Stobart incident", named after a British political officer of the time. In 1952, the Saudi Arabians sent a small constabulary force under Mohammed Bin Nasser bin Ibrahim AlGhoson and his vice Turki bin Abdullah al Otaishan to occupy Hamasa, a village in the Buraimi Oasis. When arbitration efforts broke down in 1955, the British dispatched the Trucial Oman Scouts to expel the Saudi Arabian contingent. After the British withdrew from the Gulf, a settlement was reached between Zayed bin Sultan Al Nahyan of Abu Dhabi and King Faisal of Saudi Arabia.

Under the Treaty of Jeddah (1974), Saudi Arabia recognized claims of Abu Dhabi and Oman to the oasis. In return, Abu Dhabi agreed to grant Saudi Arabia a land corridor to the Gulf at Khor Al Adaid and the oil from a disputed oil field. Some grazing and water rights remained in dispute. In March 1990 Saudi Arabia settled her borders with Oman in an agreement that also provided for shared grazing rights and use of water resources. The exact details of the boundary were not disclosed. More recently, a dispute over the Dolphin Gas Project has renewed interest in the 1974 agreement.

== Musandam Peninsula ==
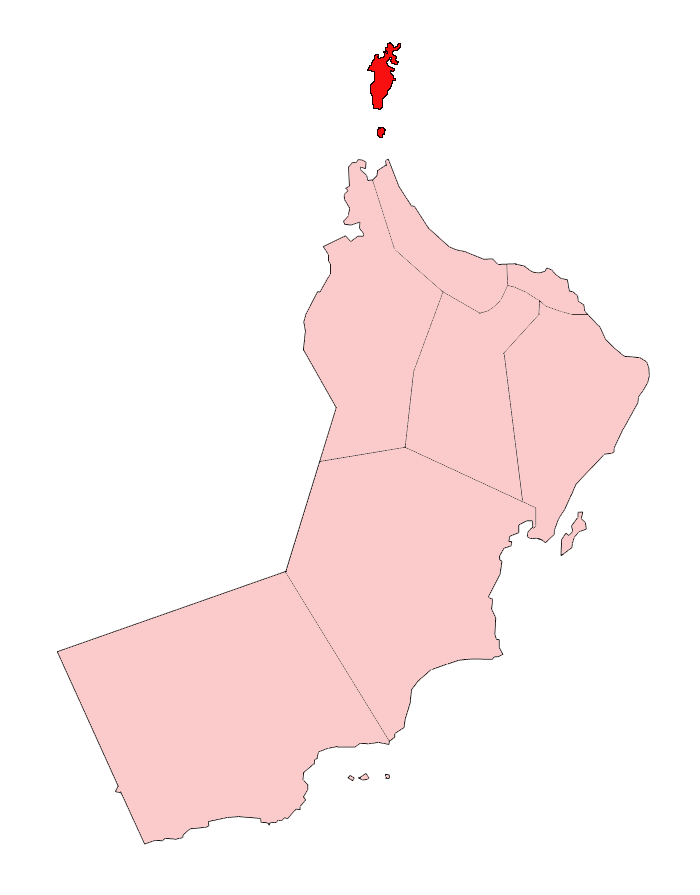
Location of Musandam in Oman

Earlier, the physical separation of the southern portion of Oman from its territory on the Musandam Peninsula was a source of friction between Oman and the various neighboring emirates that became the UAE in 1971. Differences over the disputed territory appeared to have subsided after the onset of the Iran–Iraq War in 1980.

== See also ==
- Persian Gulf naming dispute
- Arab League–Iran relations
- West Asia
- Foreign relations of Iran
- Foreign relations of Iraq
- Foreign relations of Kuwait
- Foreign relations of Saudi Arabia
- Foreign relations of Bahrain
- Foreign relations of Qatar
- Foreign relations of the United Arab Emirates
- Foreign relations of Oman
